= List of Star-Myu episodes =

Star-Myu (スタミュ Sutamyu, or STARMYU), with subtitle Kōkō Boshi Kageki (高校星歌劇; lit. High School Star Musical), is a Japanese original anime television series produced by C-Station and NBCUniversal Entertainment Japan and directed by Shunsuke Tada. It aired in Japan from October 5, 2015, to September 16, 2019, and was simulcast by Crunchyroll and Funimation.

The first season of the anime began airing in Japan on October 5, 2015, and concluded on December 22, 2015. It is licensed and distributed in North America by Funimation, who began releasing the series on Blu-ray Disc and DVD on March 7, 2017. The opening theme is "Dreamer" by Gero and the ending theme "Seishun COUNTDOWN" (星瞬COUNTDOWN) is performed by the main five voice actors (Natsuki Hanae, Kensho Ono, Arthur Lounsbery, Yoshimasa Hosoya and Tomoaki Maeno) as Team Otori.

Two OVA volumes served as the 13th and 14th episodes of the first season were released on July 27, 2016, and September 21, 2016, respectively. Team Otori (voiced by: Natsuki Hanae, Kensho Ono, Arthur Lounsbery, Yoshimasa Hosoya and Tomoaki Maeno) and Team Hiragi (voiced by: Nobuhiko Okamoto, Yuuma Uchida, Yoshitsugu Matsuoka, KENN, Kazuyuki Okitsu) both perform their own version of the opening theme "Yume・Iro" (ユメ・イロ, lit. Dream・Color) and the ending theme "C☆ngratulations!".

The second season aired between April 3, 2017, and June 19, 2017. The opening theme is "SHOW MUST GO ON!!" by Fourpe (voiced by: urashimasakatasen) and the ending theme is "Gift" by Team Otori (voiced by: Natsuki Hanae, Kensho Ono, Arthur Lounsbery, Yoshimasa Hosoya and Tomoaki Maeno).

Crunchyroll streams both seasons of the anime in the United States, Canada, United Kingdom, Ireland, Australia, New Zealand, South Africa, Iceland, Sweden, Norway, Denmark and Netherlands.

A third season aired between July 1 to September 16, 2019.

== Episode list ==
=== Season 1 ===
No.	Title	Original release date
1	"Act 1"; Transliteration: "Dai-1-maku" (Japanese: 第1幕)	October 6, 2015
In order to chase after the "aspiring high school student" that he met while he was in middle school, Yuta Hoshitani enters the prestigious Ayanagi Academy, a music school known for its intensive training. Knowing that the highschooler was a student from the Musical Department, he challenges its super, difficult audition. However, standing right in front of Hoshitani's dream is a group who reigns at the top of the school, examining him with shine in their eyes - the Kao Council!
2	"Act 2"; Transliteration: "Dai-2-maku" (Japanese: 第2幕)	October 13, 2015
After becoming a part of Kao Council member Otori's "Team Otori", Hoshitani is able to continue on as a Musical Department candidate. However, despite the fact that there's nothing wrong with their abilities, his teammates Nayuki, Tengenji, Tsukigami, and Kuga each have some kind of problem. Even with such a heavy feeling in the air, Otori starts practice in an unusual way - "Come on boys. It's time to play!"
3	"Act 3"; Transliteration: "Dai-3-maku" (Japanese: 第3幕)	October 20, 2015
Through the first practice, the difference between Hoshitani's abilities and his teammates' becomes clear. As a result, he begins to practice on his own everyday while receiving support from Nayuki. However, he's still unable to keep up with the harsh practice. In the end, the young noble of the theatrical world Tengenji has harsh words for Hoshitani - "For the sake of the team's survival, leave the team." Now under pressure, what will happen to Hoshitani? And just what is the furious Tengenji's secret?!
4	"Act 4"; Transliteration: "Dai-4-maku" (Japanese: 第4幕)	October 27, 2015
As Hoshitani continues to do his best, he begins to move the hearts of Team Otori's members. However, Tsukigami is the only one who refuses to try to work alongside them. With the pressures of being a "thoroughbred from the musical world" and an inferiority complex due to his older brother, Tsukigami suffers alone. After learning of Tsukigami's distress, Hoshitani is unsure of what to do. And at last, the star of the Star Teams, Team Hiragi appears!
5	"Act 5"; Transliteration: "Dai-5-maku" (Japanese: 第5幕)	November 3, 2015
Just as the Newcomers' Debut Performance (the upcoming test stage for the Musical Department candidates) approaches, Team Otori finally begins to work together. However, Hoshitani's skills are still lacking, causing a big issue for the team. At the same time, they witness Team Hiragi's performance. Overwhelmed by their perfection, Hoshitani suddenly feels uncertain.
6	"Act 6"; Transliteration: "Dai-6-maku" (Japanese: 第6幕)	November 10, 2015
It's finally time for the Newcomers' Debut Performance, a rigorous testing stage where half of the teams will be no longer be Musical Department candidates. Unfortunately, Hoshitani and the others still feel anxious about their performance and there are speculations that the motley Team Otori will definitely be cut. In order to support his students, Otori plots out a secret plan. As a result, what will be Team Otori's fate?!
7	"Act 7"; Transliteration: "Dai-7-maku" (Japanese: 第7幕)	November 17, 2015
Hoshitani has safely finished his first semester as a Musical Department candidate. However, the next testing stage is just ahead in the second semester. As such, under Otori's suggestion, Team Otori decides to hold a sleepover training camp during their summer vacation. Visiting a villa in the mountains, what awaits them - An abandoned house? A bear? Or maybe some unexpected people?!
8	"Act 8"; Transliteration: "Dai-8-maku" (Japanese: 第8幕)	November 24, 2015
As the second semester begins, an overview of the Ayanagi Festival performances is immediately announced. Hoshitani and the others are told that each team is free to perform whatever they want for the test stage, creating much to think about. Meanwhile, after witnessing Team Otori's reckless Newcomers' Debut Performance, one of the members of Kao Council reveals his disgust and begins to move quietly.
9	"Act 9"; Transliteration: "Dai-9-maku" (Japanese: 第9幕)	December 1, 2015
With the Ayanagi Festival performance approaching, Team Otori strives hard during practice. Then one day, Hiragi calls out to Otori. He tells him, "Team Otori's presence is affecting the traditions and standards of Ayanagi Academy", forcing Otori to make his choice. To make use of one's genius or to help the five whose future has begun to shine like stardust. When faced with the decision, Otori and Hiragi's hidden past is revealed.
10	"Act 10"; Transliteration: "Dai-10-maku" (Japanese: 第10幕)	December 8, 2015
Out of nowhere, Otori leaves the school. Having not been told anything about it, Hoshitani feels a sense of confusion and resentment, and doubts swirl in his chest. However, the test stage does not wait! Killing their anxiety, Team Otori moves onwards, else they will gradually fall apart, if they kept thinking about it. Under such circumstances, Nayuki in order to cheer Hoshitani up, went on an outing to play.
11	"Act 11"; Transliteration: "Dai-11-maku" (Japanese: 第11幕)	December 15, 2015
Team Otori, the 5 of them began to move on. One day, Hiragi, issued extracurricular activities on the field of musical profession. Hoshitani and the others are to help out on the site as staff - what, it's the prince of the Musical World! On the other hand, Hoshitani's mind is still remains caught up. "Otori-senpai, why did you left us..." It was discovered, the reason was in order to protect them!
12	"Act 12"; Transliteration: "Dai-12-maku" (Japanese: 第12幕)	December 22, 2015
Overcoming his anxiety, Hoshitani celebrates the day of Ayanagi Festival. However, due to the typhoon approaching Ayanagi Academy. There's the heartless decision to abort Team Otori's program as the Outdoor Stage Venue collapsed. "The musical that Otori-senpai taught us, I want tons of audience to watch it." Where will Hoshitani and the others' dream head to? The stage of the youth, the final chapter! For us, the way to give up our dreams, we don't know that at all!

=== OVA ===
The OVA project is set at Ayanagi Academy after the students finish the school festival and face the new year. On the day the current Kao Council members end their final duties and leave the academy, every team holds a performance during the graduation ceremony to offer their thanks.

Another OVA project has been announced to be released in October 2018. It will tell a story about Hoshitani and friends on Halloween.

No.	Title	Original release date
OVA	"Act 13"; Transliteration: "Dai-13-maku" (Japanese: 第13幕)	July 27, 2016
OVA	"Act 14"; Transliteration: "Dai-14-maku" (Japanese: 第14幕)	September 21, 2016

=== Season 2 ===
No.	Title	Original release date
1	"Act 1"; Transliteration: "Dai-1-maku" (Japanese: 第1幕)	April 3, 2017
2	"Act 2"; Transliteration: "Dai-2-maku" (Japanese: 第2幕)	April 10, 2017
3	"Act 3"; Transliteration: "Dai-3-maku" (Japanese: 第3幕)	April 17, 2017
4	"Act 4"; Transliteration: "Dai-4-maku" (Japanese: 第4幕)	April 24, 2017
5	"Act 5"; Transliteration: "Dai-5-maku" (Japanese: 第5幕)	May 1, 2017
6	"Act 6"; Transliteration: "Dai-6-maku" (Japanese: 第6幕)	May 8, 2017
7	"Act 7"; Transliteration: "Dai-7-maku" (Japanese: 第7幕)	May 15, 2017
8	"Act 8"; Transliteration: "Dai-8-maku" (Japanese: 第8幕)	May 22, 2017
9	"Act 9"; Transliteration: "Dai-9-maku" (Japanese: 第9幕)	May 29, 2017
10	"Act 10"; Transliteration: "Dai-10-maku" (Japanese: 第10幕)	June 5, 2017
11	"Act 11"; Transliteration: "Dai-11-maku" (Japanese: 第11幕)	June 12, 2017
12	"Act 12"; Transliteration: "Dai-12-maku" (Japanese: 第12幕)	June 19, 2017

=== Season 3 ===
No.	Title	Original release date
1	"Act 1"; Transliteration: "Dai-1-maku" (Japanese: 第1幕)	July 1, 2019
2	"Act 2"; Transliteration: "Dai-2-maku" (Japanese: 第2幕)	July 8, 2019
3	"Act 3"; Transliteration: "Dai-3-maku" (Japanese: 第3幕)	July 15, 2019
4	"Act 4"; Transliteration: "Dai-4-maku" (Japanese: 第4幕)	July 22, 2019
5	"Act 5"; Transliteration: "Dai-5-maku" (Japanese: 第5幕)	July 29, 2019
6	"Act 6"; Transliteration: "Dai-6-maku" (Japanese: 第6幕)	August 5, 2019
7	"Act 7"; Transliteration: "Dai-7-maku" (Japanese: 第7幕)	August 12, 2019
8	"Act 8"; Transliteration: "Dai-8-maku" (Japanese: 第8幕)	August 19, 2019
9	"Act 9"; Transliteration: "Dai-9-maku" (Japanese: 第9幕)	August 26, 2019
10	"Act 10"; Transliteration: "Dai-10-maku" (Japanese: 第10幕)	September 2, 2019
11	"Act 11"; Transliteration: "Dai-11-maku" (Japanese: 第11幕)	September 9, 2019
12	"Act 12"; Transliteration: "Dai-12-maku" (Japanese: 第12幕)	September 16, 2019
