= Digimon Adventure 02: The Beginning =

2023 film by Tomohisa Taguchi

- Theatrical release poster
- Japanese: デジモンアドベンチャー02 THE BEGINNING
- Revised Hepburn: Dejimon Adobenchā Zero Tsū Za Biginingu
- Directed by: Tomohisa Taguchi
- Written by: Akatsuki Yamatoya
- Based on: Digimon by Akiyoshi Hongo
- Produced by: Yōsuke Kinoshita
- Starring: Fukujūrō Katayama; Arthur Lounsbery; Ayaka Asai; Yoshitaka Yamaya; Junya Enoki; Mao Ichimichi; Junko Noda; Naozumi Takahashi; Kōichi Tōchika; Megumi Urawa; Miwa Matsumoto; Yuka Tokumitsu; Megumi Ogata; Rie Kugimiya
- Cinematography: Shinya Kuwabara
- Edited by: Kentarou Tsubone
- Music by: Harumi Fuuki
- Production companies: Toei Animation (Production); Yumeta Company (Animation)
- Distributed by: Toei Company
- Release dates: October 5, 2023 (Premiere); October 27, 2023 (Japan)
- Running time: 80 minutes
- Country: Japan
- Language: Japanese

Digimon Adventure 02: The Beginning (Japanese: デジモンアドベンチャー02 THE BEGINNING, Hepburn: Dejimon Adobenchā Zero Tsū Za Biginingu) is a 2023 Japanese animated adventure film directed by Tomohisa Taguchi and written by Akatsuki Yamatoya based on the Digimon franchise by Akiyoshi Hongo. Produced by Toei Animation with animation by Yumeta Company and distributed by Toei Company, The Beginning is a sequel to Digimon Adventure: Last Evolution Kizuna (2020) and serves as the series finale to the Digimon Adventure 02 story. The Beginning was first released on October 5, 2023, at Shinjuku Wald 9, and then in Japanese theaters on October 27.

On October 5, multiple movie theaters in the United States announced they would be releasing an English dub of the film on November 8. The English dub was then officially confirmed on October 10. Warner Bros. Pictures distributed the film in Thailand on November 2, 2023. Sugoi Co. distributed the film in Australia and New Zealand on November 23, 2023. PVR Inox Pictures distributed the film in India on January 5, 2024.

== Plot ==
In 2012, a giant Digi-Egg appears over Tokyo, transmitting a mysterious message that wishes for everyone on Earth to have a Digimon friend. The Adventure 02 DigiDestined encounter Lui Ohwada, who claims to be the first chosen child and attempts to reach the Digi-Egg. While assisting Lui, Davis, Ken, and their Digimon accidentally fall through the Digi-Egg and are transported back to 1996. They witness a younger Lui, who is abused by his mother, discovering a Digi-Egg. Older Lui tries to stop him, but they are then returned to the present.

Lui shares his life story with the DigiDestined. The Digi-Egg he encountered in the past hatched into Ukkomon, a Digimon that could grant wishes, who gave him the very first Digivice. Over the years, Ukkomon gleefully manipulated Lui's parents, friends and neighbors into treating him kindly. However, Lui eventually learned that his wish had led to the increase in number of other DigiDestined who were risking their lives in battles alongside their Digimon partners, (Note: As depicted in Digimon Adventure 02: Revenge of Diaboromon) much to his horror. Lui confronted Ukkomon, but the Digimon innocently declared that everything had been done for Lui's happiness. Lui accidentally injured his right eye in anger, and Ukkomon gave him his own eye as a replacement. A mentally unstable Lui insulted Ukkomon furiously, causing the Digimon to melt away and disappear, also as a result, Lui's parents suddenly ended up dropping dead due to Ukkomon puppeteering them for too long.

In the present day, the Digi-Egg hatches into a giant Ukkomon, who reappears to give Lui a birthday present, which will force a Digimon on every human on Earth, throwing society into chaos. The DigiDestined plan to stop Ukkomon but become hesitant, after T.K. becomes concerned that defeating him may nullify the relationships with their own Digimon. Davis and Veemon convince them that their relationships developed naturally and were not forced. Lui decides to meet Ukkomon, and with the help of the DigiDestined, reaches the giant Digimon. Lui resolves the issues with his mother and younger self by talking sense into the former, then confronts Ukkomon about their true feelings, and promises to reunite in the future before Lui asks the DigiDestined to destroy Ukkomon. After a short battle, Imperialdramon Fighter Mode destroys the giant Ukkomon, resulting in Ukkomon's reduction to a small Digi-Egg held by Lui who loses the eye that Ukkomon gave him. Digivices around the world start to disappear, showing that the DigiDestined and their Digimon no longer need a medium to connect with each other.

In the post-credits scene, Lui's Digi-Egg starts to hatch.

== Cast ==
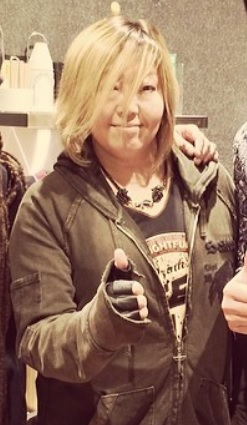
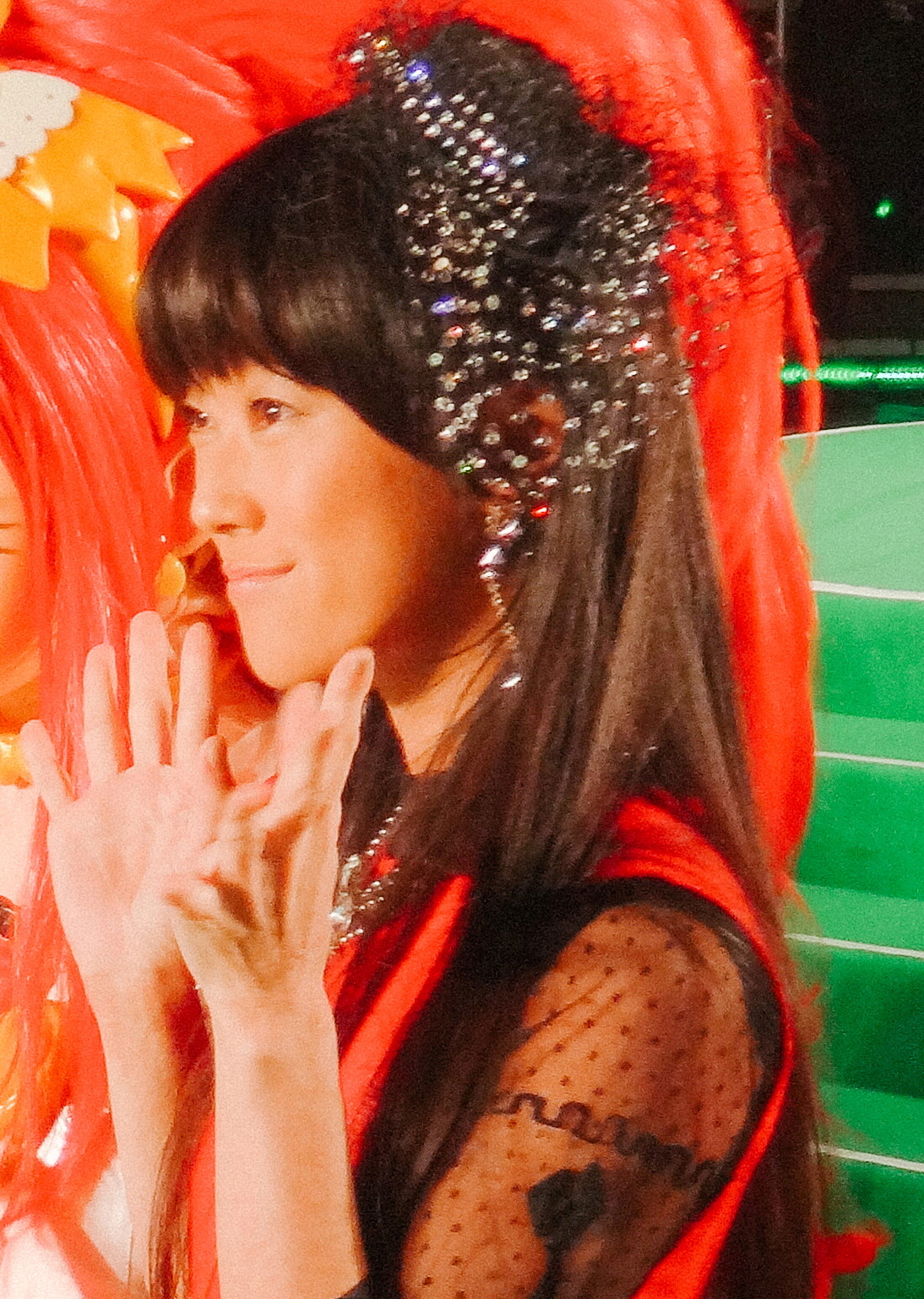
Megumi Ogata (left) and Rie Kugimiya (right) voice the two new characters.

Character	Japanese	English
Daisuke Motomiya / Davis Motomiya	Fukujūrō Katayama	Brian Donovan
Miyako Inoue / Yolei Inoue	Ayaka Asai	Jeannie Tirado
Iori Hida / Cody Hida	Yoshitaka Yamaya	Bryce Papenbrook
Takeru Takaishi / Takeru "T.K." Takaishi	Junya Enoki	Johnny Yong Bosch
Hikari Yagami / Kari Kamiya	Mao Ichimichi	Tara Sands
Ken Ichijouji	Arthur Lounsbery	Derek Stephen Prince
Lui Ohwada	Megumi Ogata	A.J. Beckles; Erin Yvette (young)
Veemon	Junko Noda	Derek Stephen Prince
Hawkmon	Kōichi Tōchika	Neil Kaplan
Armadillomon	Megumi Urawa	Robbie Daymond
Patamon	Miwa Matsumoto	Laura Summer
Tailmon / Gatomon	Yuka Tokumitsu	Kate Higgins; Erin Yvette (Angewomon)
Wormmon	Naozumi Takahashi	Christopher Swindle
Ukkomon	Rie Kugimiya	Giselle Fernandez

== Production ==
The film was first announced in August 2021 as being prominent to the television series Digimon Adventure 02. Director Tomohisa Taguchi and writer Akatsuki Yamatoya are reuniting from the latest film, Digimon Adventure: Last Evolution Kizuna, to work in The Beginning. Producer Yōsuke Kinoshita said the movie revolve around the characters from Digimon Adventure 02 rather than the first anime because of how different they are from the original cast. The first key visual used the line "I'm the first person to ever partner with a Digimon" in reference to the new character voiced by Megumi Ogata; "I became the world's first chosen child." Ogata, who is making her first appearance in the Digimon series, has trust in the director, specifically the visuals which she finds striking. Ukkomon, played by Rie Kugimiya, was the subject of the confusion by the actress as she noticed her name has impact but finds the angel-like design appealing. Producer Hiromi Seki emphasized the franchise involves different forms of relationships. Ohwada remained enigmatic to the audience as the producer and Taguchi came up with several twists about his role in the movie.

In July 2023, a new trailer was released a new line about a "sad yet gentle truth behind the birth of DigiDestined", the main characters from the both television series. In the main visual, which was unveiled at the same time as this preview, all six "DigiDestined" gather against the backdrop of countless digital balls spread over Tokyo Tower. The staff for upcoming new film unveiled four character poster visuals on September 11, 2023, and used music from the television series to promote it; "Ashita wa Atashi no Kaze ga Fuku" by AiM. Taguchi emphasized a different theme within The Beginning that makes the film stand out; While Last Evolution Kizuna focused on the end of the DigiDestined, The Beginning instead deals with their origins.

During the production of the English dub, actor Paul St. Peter was approached to reprise his role as Wormmon, but declined as Toei would not offer a union contract, despite previous Digimon productions offering SAG dubbers contracts. He was replaced by Christopher Swindle.
