= Laura Summer =

American actress

- Occupations: Voice actress, producer
- Years active: 1983–present
- Notable credit(s): The Real Ghostbusters; Digimon Adventure, Digimon Adventure 02 and Digimon Adventure tri.

Laura Summer is an American voice actress and producer.

== Career ==
Summer's career began in New York City theater, when she was cast in a production of Antony and Cleopatra, directed by Estelle Parsons. Including voice-over work, she has appeared in over 100 commercials. In the 1980s, she was cast as the trainee for Inspector 12, in the Hanes underwear campaign, known for coining the phrase, "They don't say Hanes until I say they say Hanes".

Her voice acting work includes The Real Ghostbusters as Janine Melnitz, Hello Kitty's Paradise as Mimi, Heather Hogwarsh in Super Pig and the Digimon Adventure series as Patamon. She reprised her Patamon role in the sequel, Digimon Adventure 02. Regarding her role in The Real Ghostbusters, she was interviewed concerning the role, and the interview was included in the DVD set put out by Time/Life, The Real Ghostbusters: Complete Collection. She was replaced on The Real Ghostbusters due to some groups complaining that her characterization was too edgy and sexy for young girls.

Summer again reprised her role as Patamon in Digimon: The Movie in 2000. In 2007, Summers was part of the creative team, along with Jim Vallely and Maggie Row, who created the "Hollywood Father/Daughter Purity Ball", a parody of a purity ball. From 2008 through 2013, Summers had a recurring role on the animated The Garfield Show, where she played the dual roles of twins Druisilla and Minerva.

For the Digimon Adventure tri. movie series, Summer was again called upon to provide the voice of Patamon. She voiced the role in all six films in the series. For this role, in 2017 Summer was nominated for a Behind the Voice Actors Awards (BTVA) in the Best Female Supporting Vocal Performance in an Anime Movie/Special category. She also reprised her role as Patamon in Digimon Adventure: Last Evolution Kizuna.

== Filmography ==
=== Voice actress ===
- The Real Ghostbusters as Janine Melnitz, Helen Schreck, Alice Johnson, Catherine, Snrag (Season 1 and 2)
- Hello Kitty's Paradise as Mimi
- Super Pig as Heather Hogswarsh
- Channel Umptee-3 as Additional Voices
- Flint the Time Detective as Princess Hightower
- Digimon Adventure and Digimon Adventure 02 as Patamon, Tokomon, Poyomon, Sonya, Noriko Kawada
- Digimon Rumble Arena as Patamon
- Digimon: The Movie as Patamon
- The Garfield Show as Druisilla, Minerva, Gloria, Heather Wilson, Lucerita, Tabitha, Spring, Summer, Autumn
- Digimon Adventure tri. as Patamon
- Twin Star Exorcists as Mayura
- Digimon Adventure: Last Evolution Kizuna as Patamon
- Digimon Adventure 02: The Beginning as Patamon
- Digimon Adventure: Our War Game! (standalone dub) as Patamon
- Digimon Adventure 02: Digimon Hurricane Touchdown!! / Transcendent Evolution! The Golden Digimentals (standalone dub) as Patamon

=== Actress ===
- New Love, American Style as Comedy Vignettes
- Girls Nite Out as Jane
- The Facts of Life as Emily
- Night Court as Obsessed Fan
- Hard to Hold as Fan #1
- The Adventure of the Action Hunters as The Wife
- She's Out of Control as Receptionist
- Nobody's Perfect as Nurse
- Problem Child as Additional Voices (Voice)
- Beverly Hills Cop III (Voice)
- Grace Under Fire as Woman #2
- Brotherly Love as Julie
- Dare to Love as Additional Voices
- Keeping the Faith (Voices)
- The Ultimate Christmas Present as (Voices)
- The Poof Point as Spaceship Computer (Voices)
- Shallow Hal as Additional Voices
- The Cheetah Girls as Additional Voices (Uncredited)
- Tiger Cruise (Voices)
- I Do, They Don't (Voices)
- Life Is Ruff as Mom
- Pizza My Heart (Voice, Uncredited)
- Twitches as Additional Voices (Voice, Uncredited)
- Twitches Too (Voice)
- Princess (Voice, Uncredited)
- Bride Wars (Voice)
- Dadnapped (Voice)
- Hatching Pete (Voice)
- Let It Shine (Voice, Uncredited)
- Lovestruck: The Musical (Voice)

=== Producer ===
- Fight It or Bite It (executive producer - 6 episodes)
