= Star-Myu =

Japanese anime television series

- Promotional image of the anime television series featuring the main characters

スタミュ (Sutamyu)
- Genre: Music, Comedy, Slice of life
- Manga
- Written by: Ren Hidō
- Published by: ASCII Media Works
- English publisher: SG: Gempak Starz
- Magazine: Sylph
- Original run: 22 May 2015 – 22 October 2015
- Volumes: 1
- Audio drama

Forever Stage
- Released: 5 August 2015
- Anime television series
- Directed by: Shunsuke Tada
- Written by: Sayaka Harada
- Music by: Ken Arai
- Studio: C-Station
- Licensed by: NA: Funimation; UK: MVM Entertainment
- Original network: Tokyo MX, BS11, KBS, SUN, AT-X
- Original run: 5 October 2015 – 16 September 2019
- Episodes: 36
- Manga

Star-Myu: Stardust's Dream
- Written by: Ren Hidō
- Published by: ASCII Media Works
- Magazine: Sylph
- Original run: 22 April 2016 – 22 May 2017
- Volumes: 2
- Original video animation
- Directed by: Shunsuke Tada
- Written by: Sayaka Harada
- Music by: Ken Arai
- Studio: C-Station
- Licensed by: UK: MVM Entertainment
- Released: 27 July 2016 – 21 September 2016
- Episodes: 2

Star-Myu (スタミュ, Sutamyu; or STARMYU), with subtitle Kōkō Boshi Kageki (高校星歌劇; lit. High School Star Musical) is a Japanese original anime television series produced by C-Station and NBCUniversal Entertainment Japan. It aired in Japan starting from 5 October 2015 to 16 September 2019. It has generated 3 anime seasons, 2 OVAs, a stage musical adaptation, 2 manga adaptations, 2 radio programs, multiple musical song CDs and drama CDs, as well as a variety of related merchandise and collaboration. The franchise also got a sequel stage musical in July 2018 and a new OVA project on October 24, 2018.

== Plot ==
The series tells the story of five students, Yuta Hoshitani, Toru Nayuki, Kaito Tsukigami, Kakeru Tengenji, and Shu Kuga as they struggle to enter the Musical Department of Ayanagi Academy, an elite school for aspiring musical performers. They want to be accepted to the Star Frame Class, which is directly taught by the members of the Kao Council, the most talented students from the Musical Department who stand at the top within the academy. Luckily, they are spotted by Itsuki Otori, one of Kao Council members who puts them on his Star Team.

== Characters ==
=== Team Otori ===
Yuta Hoshitani (星谷 悠太, Hoshitani Yūta)
Voiced by: Natsuki Hanae
Hoshitani is the bright and cheerful member of Team Otori. In the fall of his 2nd year in middle school, he was deeply touched by a certain high schooler's performance. Following that student who was wearing an Ayanagi Academy musical department uniform, he enters Ayanagi. In middle school he was in the ordinary department, and is basically an amateur concerning musicals and theater. However, his motivation and absorption of skills is top notch, and is a mood-maker who can be bright and optimistic no matter how hard the obstacle is. His roommate is Toru Nayuki.
Toru Nayuki (那雪 透, Nayuki Tōru)
Voiced by: Kenshō Ono
Nayuki is the kind and gentle member of Team Otori that Hoshitani met during the entrance ceremony, and later on they find out that they are roommates. He initially had no intention of applying for the music department, only auditioning because of Hoshitani, but he came to love performing and becomes one of Hoshitani's closest friends. He has stage fright, which can be repelled by letting him drink a special tea which is a specialty of the Nayuki family.
Kaito Tsukigami (月皇 海斗, Tsukigami Kaito)
Voiced by: Arthur Lounsbery
With his father as a famous director, his mother as one of the most prolific theatrical actresses in Japan, and his older brother a musical genius, it was only natural for Tsukigami to enter Ayanagi. However, he greatly dislikes being compared to his family, especially his older brother who is an alumnus of Ayanagi. Though coming off as stiff and somewhat strict, Tsukigami gradually comes to care greatly for his companions especially after Hoshitani stands up for him, followed by his fellow teammates. He aims to become an actor. His roommate is Shu Kuga.
Kakeru Tengenji (天花寺 翔, Tengenji Kakeru)
Voiced by: Yoshimasa Hosoya
As a famous Kabuki actor from a well-known family, Tengenji has pride issues, looking down upon those who are not in the same class as him. Because he's lived in a world full of adults from a very young age, he is bad at communicating with peers, and does not fully understand the concept of friends, but because of the kindness and that Hoshitani showed him, he learns how to appreciate others. Due to being popular, he has gained a lot of female fans, and there have been rumors that the noise from his dorm room came from bringing women in. These rumors are proven false upon the introduction of Tavian, Tengenji's pet cat that he loves dearly.
Shu Kuga (空閑 愁, Kuga Shū)
Voiced by: Tomoaki Maeno
Kuga is the quiet and aloof member of Team Otori. After the death of his father, Kuga wanted to make his mother happy by imitating the musicals he saw on television, which led to him pursuing the musical world. According to Toraishi, being late for the musical department auditions has caused Kuga to be a member of Team Otori even though he had the skills to become a member of Team Hiragi. He gets along fairly well with his fellow members although maintains his silent demeanor. He works part-time at a bar with a piano, because he wanted to work in a place with something musical-related. His piano skills are self-taught, while his drawing skills are poor. His roommate is Kaito Tsukigami.

=== Team Hiragi ===
Rui Tatsumi (辰己 琉唯, Tatsumi Rui)
Voiced by: Nobuhiko Okamoto
Tatsumi is the leader of Team Hiragi who attended the same middle school as Tsukigami and Nayuki. He has always wanted to surpass Tsukigami even at a young age. Though he is kind, he is very confident in his and his team's skills, claiming not to see Team Otori as threats. He is childhood friends with Eigo Sawatari, and they were often called "Princess" and "Knight".
Eigo Sawatari (申渡 栄吾, Sawatari Eigo)
Voiced by: Yuma Uchida
Sawatari is the serious and mature member of Team Hiragi who attended the same middle school as Tsukigami and Nayuki. He is good at observing and analyzing music. He is childhood friends with Rui Tatsumi, and they were often called "Princess" and "Knight".
Akira Ugawa (卯川 晶, Ugawa Akira)
Voiced by: Yoshitsugu Matsuoka
Contrary to his angelic appearance, Ugawa is Team Hiragi's little devil. His bratty personality often causes him to clash with Tengenji and Tsukigami, but he listens to Tatsumi whenever he asks him to stop. However, according to Team Hiragi, he's not really a bad guy even though he has a bad mouth.
Izumi Toraishi (虎石 和泉, Toraishi Izumi)
Voiced by: KENN
Toraishi is the fashionable and flirty member of Team Hiragi. With a handsome face, he is very popular among women, even taking them out using Kuga's motorcycle. Though he resembles a delinquent, he is actually a caring guy. He is childhood friends with Kuga.
Seishiro Inumine (戌峰 誠士郎, Inumine Seishirō)
Voiced by: Kazuyuki Okitsu
Similar to Hoshitani, the bright and friendly Inumine is Team Hiragi's mood maker. Though he is an airhead and a bit idiotic at times, he has a natural talent for music and a well-toned body. He often sings out of nowhere. His family runs a Chinese restaurant.

=== Team Yuzuriha ===
Riku Ageha (揚羽 陸, Ageha Riku)
Voiced by: Nobunaga Shimazaki
So Hachiya (蜂矢 聡, Hachiya Sō)
Voiced by: Kengo Takanashi
Tetsuya Koumoto (甲本 哲也, Koumoto Tetsuya)
Rei Hotarubi (蛍灯 玲, Hotarubi Rei)
Kazuomi Arisaka (蟻坂 和臣, Arisaka Kazuomi)

=== Team Sazanami ===
Ren Kitahara (北原 廉, Kitahara Ren)
Voiced by: Yūichirō Umehara
Koki Nanjo (南條 聖, Nanjō Kōki)
Voiced by: Shunsuke Takeuchi
Haruma Nakakoji (中小路 春馬, Nakakoji Haruma)
Todo Hajime (東堂 創, Hajime Todo)
Kasai Yusei (香西 遊晴, Yusei Kasai)

=== Kao Council ===
Tsubasa Hiragi (柊 翼, Hīragi Tsubasa)
Voiced by: Daisuke Hirakawa
Heir to the Hiragi clan, who have been chairmen for Ayanagi Academy. As the top student in the musical department, he feels it is his job to extract the talented starts bearing the Ayanagi brand. So serious that he is not accommodating at all. Acknowledges Otori's talent more than anyone else, and feels that he has more talent than even himself, so he worked behind the scenes to have Otori enter Kao Student Council. He is livid concerning Otori's unprecedented acts that can jeopardize the position including adding Hoshitani et al into the star slots.
Itsuki Otori (鳳 樹, Ōtori Itsuki)
Voiced by: Junichi Suwabe
An elite born into the branch family of Ayanagi Academy's chairman clan, but has no care for status or glory. With the reason of "they look interesting", he picks up Hoshitani and the other four during the musical department auditions. Adept at hiding his true feelings, so everyone around him think of him as a "strange senpai". His skills are top notch. A genius and a nonconformist.
Kyoji Akatsuki (暁 鏡司, Akatsuki Kyōji)
Voiced by: Showtaro Morikubo
Confident that no one knows more about the school's policies than he does, Akatsuki cannot forgive anything that disgraces Ayanagi Academy's traditions or taint Hiragi's name. He has a bad temper and isn't bothered by this as he sees no reason to go out of his way to be polite. Akatsuki holds a grudge against Otori for what he did to Hiragi years before.
Lion Christian Yuzuriha (楪゠クリスチアン゠リオン, Yuzuriha Kurisuchian Rion)
Voiced by: Kōsuke Toriumi
Flamboyant and energetic, Yuzuriha is the mood maker of the Kao Council. Compared to the other members, he acts a bit more childish but still takes his duties as a member of the Kao Council seriously. He was born in France but moved to Japan before starting school at Ayanagi Academy.
Sakuya Sazanami (漣 朔也, Sazanami Sakuya)
Voiced by: Wataru Hatano
Confident in his ability to tackle things with earnestness, Sazanami acts in a very mature manner. He highly values honestly and fairness and cannot forgive things that make light of manners such as attitudes and bad behavior.

=== New Kao Council ===
Toma Shiki (四季 斗真, Shiki Tōma)
Voiced by: Daisuke Namikawa
Ryo Fuyusawa (冬沢 亮, Fuyusawa Ryō)
Voiced by: Sōma Saitō
Shion Kasugano (春日野 詩音, Kasugano Shion)
Voiced by: Daiki Yamashita
Masashi Iranatsu (入夏 将志, Iranatsu Masahi)
Voiced by: Ryōta Ōsaka
Chiaki Takafumi (千秋 貴史, Takafumi Chiaki)
Voiced by: Katsuyuki Konishi

=== Ancients ===
Haruto Tsukigami (月皇 遥斗, Tsukigami Haruto)
Voiced by: Takehito Koyasu
Kaito Tsukigami's older brother. Kind and mature, Haruto is the ideal older brother and upperclassmen. He is considered a genius actor, and was previous a member of Kao Council coaching Team Tsukigami. He graduated Ayanagi Academy at the top of his class and became a famous musical star. Although strict at times, he is supportive and only wishes well for others, especially his brother whom he hopes will be able to enjoy his school life with his friends. He takes his work seriously.
Asaki Uozumi (魚住 朝喜, Uozumi Asaki)
Voiced by: Toshiyuki Morikawa
Ritsu Saotome (早乙女 律, Saotome Ritsu)
Voiced by: Ryōtarō Okiayu
Taiga Futaba (双葉 大我, Futaba Taiga)
Voiced by: Sōichirō Hoshi

=== Other characters ===
Yuki Nayuki (那雪 ゆうき, Nayuki Yūki)
Voiced by: Kana Asumi
Toru Nayuki's younger sister. She and Tsumugi are identical twins. Between the two, Yuki does most of the talking. She is more positive compared to Tsumugi who is more negative. She is confident in her clothes making skills and is usually responsible for designing original costumes. Although Toru is the older brother, it's usually the twins who have to look out for their brother the most, walking with him on his first day of school or giving him the family's secret recipe tea to calm his nerves.
Tsumugi Nayuki (那雪 つむぎ, Nayuki Tsumugi)
Voiced by: Hisako Kanemoto
Toru Nayuki's younger sister. Between her and Yuki, Tsumugi is the least expressive of the two. As Yuki does most of the talking, Tsumugi usually makes a short comment after her sister. She is more negative as compared to Yuki who is more positive. Tsumugi and Yuki are both good at sewing and have a fashion sense that can be compared to the levels of professionals.

== Media ==
=== Manga ===
A manga adaptation illustrated by Ren Hidō, ran in ASCII Media Works's manga magazine Sylph from 22 June 2015 in its August 2015 issue to 22 October 2015 in its December 2015 issue. It goes in-depth into some of Team Otori's issues/history which were untold in the anime. Gempak Starz licensed the manga for distribution in Malaysia and Singapore.

A sequel to the manga titled Star-Myu: Stardust's Dream began serialization in the same magazine on 22 April 2016 in its June 2016 issue.

=== Drama CD ===
The first drama CD was announced prior to the anime television series and was released on 5 August 2015, titled ☆☆Forever★Stage☆☆ (☆☆永遠★STAGE☆☆, ☆☆Eien★STAGE☆☆). It is set during the period between episode 1 and episode 2 of the anime.

The second drama CD was released on 21 December 2016, titled Second STAGE.

The third drama CD was released on 9 February 2017, titled Third STAGE.

=== Musical song series CD ===
For each season of the anime, 12 musical song CDs are released for 12 weeks in a row, concurrent with 12 episodes of that season. These CDs contain the musical songs used in the anime story, as well as character image songs.

Season 1

Release date	Title	Peak Oricon Chart position	Weeks on Oricon Chart
7 October 2015	Star-Myu Musical Song Series ☆SHOW TIME 1☆	87	3
14 October 2015	Star-Myu Musical Song Series ☆SHOW TIME 2☆	45	4
21 October 2015	Star-Myu Musical Song Series ☆SHOW TIME 3☆	54	5
28 October 2015	Star-Myu Musical Song Series ☆SHOW TIME 4☆	65	3
4 November 2015	Star-Myu Musical Song Series ☆SHOW TIME 5☆	54	3
11 November 2015	Star-Myu Musical Song Series ☆SHOW TIME 6☆	50	7
18 November 2015	Star-Myu Musical Song Series ☆SHOW TIME 7☆	73	3
25 November 2015	Star-Myu Musical Song Series ☆SHOW TIME 8☆	82	2
2 December 2015	Star-Myu Musical Song Series ☆SHOW TIME 9☆	50	4
9 December 2015	Star-Myu Musical Song Series ☆SHOW TIME 10☆	59	4
16 December 2015	Star-Myu Musical Song Series ☆SHOW TIME 11☆	54	3
23 December 2015	Star-Myu Musical Song Series ☆SHOW TIME 12☆	19	4

Season 2

Release date	Title	Peak Oricon Chart position	Weeks on Oricon Chart
5 April 2017	Star-Myu Musical Song Series ☆2nd SHOW TIME 1☆	40	5
12 April 2017	Star-Myu Musical Song Series ☆2nd SHOW TIME 2☆	25	6
19 April 2017	Star-Myu Musical Song Series ☆2nd SHOW TIME 3☆	40	4
26 April 2017	Star-Myu Musical Song Series ☆2nd SHOW TIME 4☆	34	5
3 May 2017	Star-Myu Musical Song Series ☆2nd SHOW TIME 5☆	33	4
10 May 2017	Star-Myu Musical Song Series ☆2nd SHOW TIME 6☆	35	4
17 May 2017	Star-Myu Musical Song Series ☆2nd SHOW TIME 7☆	31	4
24 May 2017	Star-Myu Musical Song Series ☆2nd SHOW TIME 8☆	49	3
31 May 2017	Star-Myu Musical Song Series ☆2nd SHOW TIME 9☆	36	4
7 June 2017	Star-Myu Musical Song Series ☆2nd SHOW TIME 10☆	38	
14 June 2017	Star-Myu Musical Song Series ☆2nd SHOW TIME 11☆	23	
21 June 2017	Star-Myu Musical Song Series ☆2nd SHOW TIME 12☆	13	

=== Radio ===
A radio program titled Star-Myu Radio 〜Mezase! Radio Star〜 (スタミュラジオ 〜目指せ!ラジオスター〜), hosted by Arthur Lounsbery, the voice actor of Kaito Tsukigami, was delivered biweekly on Wednesday from Onsen (音泉), from 26 August 2015 to 10 February 2016. The recordings were collected into 2 CDs released on 27 January and 30 March 2016.

The second season of the radio program, titled Star-Myu (Season 2) Web Radio ～AYANAGI Star RADIO～ (スタミュ(第2期)webラジオ ～AYANAGI Star RADIO～), was delivered from 4 April to 20 June 2017.

=== Anime ===
The anime television series is produced by NBCUniversal Entertainment Japan and animated by C-Station. It is an original creation of Rin Hinata and is directed by Shunsuke Tada, with series composition by Sayaka Harada. The series features music by Ken Arai and character designs by Asami Watanabe. It was initially titled as High School Star Musical (ハイスクールスター・ミュージカル, Haisukūrusutā Myūjikaru) but has since shortened to Star-Myu (スタミュ, Sutamyu; or STARMYU) as the official title.

The first season of the anime began airing in Japan on 5 October 2015 and concluded on 22 December 2015. It is licensed and distributed in North America by Funimation, who began releasing the series on Blu-ray Disc and DVD on 7 March 2017. The opening theme is "Dreamer" by Gero and the ending theme "Seishun COUNTDOWN" (星瞬COUNTDOWN) is performed by the main five voice actors (Natsuki Hanae, Kensho Ono, Arthur Lounsbery, Yoshimasa Hosoya and Tomoaki Maeno) as Team Otori.

Two OVA volumes served as the 13th and 14th episodes of the first season were released on 27 July and 21 September 2016, respectively. Team Otori (voiced by: Natsuki Hanae, Kensho Ono, Arthur Lounsbery, Yoshimasa Hosoya and Tomoaki Maeno) and Team Hiragi (voiced by: Nobuhiko Okamoto, Yuma Uchida, Yoshitsugu Matsuoka, KENN, Kazuyuki Okitsu) both perform their own version of the opening theme "Yume・Iro" (ユメ・イロ; lit. Dream・Color) and the ending theme "C☆ngratulations!".

The second season aired between 3 April and 19 June 2017. The opening theme is "SHOW MUST GO ON!!" by Fourpe (voiced by: urashimasakatasen) and the ending theme is "Gift" by Team Otori (voiced by: Natsuki Hanae, Kensho Ono, Arthur Lounsbery, Yoshimasa Hosoya and Tomoaki Maeno).

Crunchyroll streams both seasons of the anime in the United States, Canada, United Kingdom, Ireland, Australia, New Zealand, South Africa, Iceland, Sweden, Norway, Denmark and Netherlands.

A third season aired between 1 July and 16 September 2019. The opening theme is performed by Kōta Shinzato.

=== OVA ===
The OVA project is set at Ayanagi Academy after the students finish the school festival and face the new year. On the day the current Kao Council members end their final duties and leave the academy, every team holds a performance during the graduation ceremony to offer their thanks.

Another OVA project has been announced to be released on October 24, 2018. It will tell a story about Hoshitani and friends on Halloween.

=== Stage musical ===
A musical based on the anime titled Musical Star-Myu (ミュージカル「スタミュ」, Myūjikaru「Sutamyu」; or Star-Myu-Myu スタミュミュ) was performed at Zepp Blue Theater Roppongi in Tokyo from 1 to 9 April 2017 and then at Morinomiya Piloti Hall in Osaka from 15 to 16 April 2017. It adapts the anime's first season and features the songs from the first season.

A spinoff musical focused on Team Hiragi titled Musical Star-Myu Spin-Off Team Hiragi Solo Review Performance「Caribbean Groove」 (ミュージカル「スタミュ」スピンオフ team柊 単独レビュー公演「Caribbean Groove」) ran at Maihama Amphitheater in Urayasu from 27 to 28 April 2018.

A sequel titled Musical Star-Myu Second Season (ミュージカル「スタミュ」-2ndシーズン-) ran at Nippon Seinenkan Hall in Tokyo from 4 to 11 July 2018 and then at Morinomiya Piloti Hall in Osaka from 20 to 22 July 2018.

The cast includes:

Character	Musical Star-Myu	Caribbean Groove	Musical Star-Myu 2nd Season	Shuffle Revue	Caribbean Groove (Re-run)	Musical Star-Myu 3rd Season
Yuta Hoshitani	Taishi Sugie		Taishi Sugie	Taishi Sugie		Taishi Sugie
Toru Nayuki	Shota Yamanaka		Shota Yamanaka	Shota Yamanaka		Shota Yamanaka
Kaito Tsukigami	Arthur Lounsbery		Arthur Lounsbery			Soichiro Sorihashi
Kakeru Tengenji	Shogo Suzuki		Shogo Suzuki			Tatsumaru Tachibana
Shu Kuga	Kensuke Takahashi		Kota Shinzato	Kota Shinzato		Kota Shinzato
Rui Tatsumi	Keito Sakurai	Keito Sakurai	Keito Sakurai	Keito Sakurai	Keito Sakurai	Keito Sakurai
Eigo Sawatari	Naoya Kitagawa	Naoya Kitagawa	Naoya Kitagawa	Naoya Kitagawa	Naoya Kitagawa	Naoya Kitagawa
Seishiro Inumine	Seiji Tanzawa	Seiji Tanzawa	Seiji Tanzawa		Seiji Tanzawa	Seiji Tanzawa
Izumi Toraishi	Akira Takano	Akira Takano	Akira Takano		Akira Takano	Gaku Takamoto
Akira Ugawa	Yuzuki Hoshimoto	Yuzuki Hoshimoto	Yuzuki Hoshimoto	Yuzuki Hoshimoto	Yuzuki Hoshimoto	Yuzuki Hoshimoto
Tsubasa Hiragi	Ryo Hatakeyama	Ryo Hatakeyama	Ryo Hatakeyama			
Itsuki Otori	Haruki Kiyama		Haruki Kiyama	Haruki Kiyama		
Kyoji Akatsuki	Ryo Takizawa		Ryo Takizawa			
Yuzuriha Christian Lion	Minami Tsurimoto		Minami Tsurimoto			Minami Tsurimoto
Sakuya Sazanami	TAKA		TAKA			TAKA
Haruto Tsukigami	(TBA)^{V}		(TBA)^{V}			Takehito Koyasu^{v}
Riku Ageha						Takuto Omi
So Hachiya						Shun Ishida
Ren Kitahara						Ryo Shibuki
Koki Nanjo						Aren Kohatsu
Francis*						Yuta Higuchi
Alexandre Bernard*						Kohei Norizuki

Notes:

- An empty, dark grey cell indicates the character was not in the stage, or that the character's official presence has not yet been confirmed.
- ^{V} indicates a voice-only role.
- * indicates a stage-only original character.
