= Arthur Lounsbery =

Japanese voice actor

- ランズベリー・コナン・アーサー
- Born: Arthur Conant Lounsbery; California, United States
- Occupations: Voice actor; narrator
- Years active: 2011–present
- Agent: 81 Produce

Arthur Conant Lounsbery (ランズベリー・コナン・アーサー, Ranzuberī Konan Āsā) is a Japanese voice actor and narrator affiliated with 81 Produce. His major roles include Felix Louis-Claude Mont d'Or in Argonavis, Ryugel Baran in Inazuma Eleven GO: Galaxy, Twinblade Arthur in Million Arthur and Kaito Tsukigami in Star-Myu.

== Career ==
Lounsbery was born in California. His family moved to Kanagawa Prefecture, when he was approximately one-and-a-half years old. He is three quarters Japanese. He graduated from high school when he was supposed to be in his first year and took university exams when he was supposed to be in his second year. He became a voice actor after attending high school, which was suggested to him by his co-worker from his part-time job. Lounsbery graduated from Amusement Media Academy (アミューズメントメディア総合学院), under Voice Actor Talent Department (声優タレント学科).

His first work when he was still in the academy was The Accidental Couple, his first official debut after entering his agency 81 Produce was Phi Brain: Puzzle of God. His first regular role was as Ryugel Baran in Inazuma Eleven GO: Galaxy. In 2015, his break-out role came when he was cast as Kaito Tsukigami in Star-Myu, in which he sang numerous songs. Lounsbery is active in various fields, such as competitive gamer and model. When he debuted in 2011, he was cast as Cristian in a film centered around the life of voice actors, titled "Kami☆Voice: The Voice Makes a Miracle". In 2013, he was part of 81 Produce's live-action unit "soffive". Currently, he is a member of Animate Channel's group 8P (or eight piece). In August 2016, Lounsbery won place in the National Best 8 Players at the official national convention of Dissidia Final Fantasy. He collaborated as model with Eyemirror (執事眼鏡eyemirror) for their "under score" brand in February 2017, and with LIVERTINE AGE in September 2020. In April 2017, he reprised his role for Musical Star-Myu (ミュージカル スタミュ), which is the stage musical adaptation of the anime Star-Myu.

He is the band vocalist of Stellagram.

== Filmography ==
=== Anime series ===
2011

- Phi Brain: Puzzle of God as Male Student_{(ep 1)}

2012

- Medaka Box Abnormal as Committee Chief_{(ep 12)}
- Sket Dance as Servant_{(ep 74)}

2013

- Gatchaman Crowds as Contributor_{(ep 9)}, Homeland Security_{(ep 10)}
- Inazuma Eleven GO: Galaxy as Ryugel Baran
- Seiyuu Sentai Voicetorm 7 (声優戦隊ボイストーム7; lit. Voice Actor Force Voicetorm 7) as Butler, Male Student, Glasses-wearing Man

2014

- Buddy Complex as Garcian Bass_{(eps 2–5, 12, 13)}, Vajra operator_{(eps 7–10)}, Alliance maintenance member A_{(ep 11)}
- Buddy Complex: Into the Skies of Tomorrow as Garcian Bass_{(Second half)}, Mishima_{(First half)}
- Dragon Collection as Merchant A_{(eps 3, 4)}, Soldier_{(ep 5)}
- Duel Masters Versus as Staff
- Free! -Eternal Summer- as Male Student_{(ep 1)}
- Haikyū!! (2014–2016)
  - Season 1 as Shinji Watari_{(eps 6, 7, 19–24)}, Sakurai_{(eps 15, 16)}, Kitagawa Daiichi member B_{(ep 1)}, Scorekeeping youth_{(ep 4)}
  - Season 2 as Shinji Watari_{(eps 19–25)}

2015

- Cross Ange: Rondo of Angels and Dragons as Communication Soldier_{(ep 13)}
- Food Wars! Shokugeki no Soma as Schoolboy A_{(ep 19)},Schoolboy C_{(ep 22)}, Schoolboy D_{(ep 21)}
- Omakase! Miracle Cat-dan as Kurokawa_{(ep 26)}
- Star-Myu: High School Star Musical (2015–2019)
  - 3 seasons as Kaito Tsukigami

2016

- Aikatsu Stars! (2016–2018)
  - 2 seasons as Kanata Kira_{(eps 13, 17, 28, 32, 36, 37, 43, 45, 47, 50, 61, 69, 75, 79, 83, 87, 88)}
- Age 12: A Little Heart-Pounding as Kenta Mori_{(ep 2)}
- Kamiwaza Wanda as Tapioka_{(eps 11, 17)}, Mr. Morimoto_{(ep 20)}, Man_{(ep 22)}, Mutemin_{(eps 23, 24)}, Mr. Tony_{(ep 26)}, Koromin_{(ep 31)}, Ginga Hoshi Saburō_{(ep 35)}
- Luck & Logic as Kitaoka_{(ep 6)}
- Maho Girls PreCure! as Male Student_{(ep 34)}
- Reikenzan: Hoshikuzu-tachi no Utage as Un_{(eps 1–4, 9, 12)}
- Shin Atashinchi as Delinquent youth A_{(ep 25)}

2017

- Akiba's Trip: The Animation as Jiro Nishi_{(ep 7)}
- Hell Girl: The Fourth Twilight as Yoshinori Nagayama_{(ep 3)}
- Kirakira PreCure a la Mode as High School Student_{(ep 3)}
- Masamune-kun's Revenge as Shigeo Yamada_{(ep 1)}
- My Girlfriend Is Shobitch as Seiya Hoshikawa_{(eps 6, 7, 9, 10)}

2018

- Merc Storia: The Apathetic Boy and the Girl in a Bottle as Teufel (トイフェル)_{(ep 11)}

2019

- Actors: Songs Connection as Satoru Nijō_{(ep 9)}

2020

- Argonavis from BanG Dream! as Felix Louis-Claude Mont D'or_{(eps 11, 12)}
- Breakers as Shun

2021

- Project Scard: Scar on the Praeter as Yamato Kai

2022

- She Professed Herself Pupil of the Wise Man as Ratri (ラトリ)_{(ep 9)}
- Yu-Gi-Oh! Go Rush!! as Yudias Velgear

2025

- The Dark History of the Reincarnated Villainess as Cheneau Clematis

=== Anime films ===
- Aikatsu Stars! The Movie as Kanata Kira (2016)
- Digimon Adventure: Last Evolution Kizuna as Ken Ichijōji (2020)
- Digimon Adventure 02: The Beginning as Ken Ichijōji (2023)

=== Original video animation ===
- Kyō, Koi o Hajimemasu as Student (2010)
- Beyond the Boundary: Daybreak as Youmu (2014)
- Star-Myu: High School Star Musical (2016–2018)
  - 3 OVAs as Kaito Tsukigami

=== Original net animation ===
- Iji Moto Gattai Moji Bakeru Z (異字元合体もじバケるZ) as Sho Capital (2014)
- Bonjour ♪ Sweet Love Patisserie as Maximilian Takeda_{(eps 21–23)} (2015)
- Chō Jigen Henkei FrameRobo (超次元変形フレームロボ) as Mars (2015)
- Whistle! as Satoru Ogata, Vice Captain (2016)
- Jaku-San-Sei Million Arthur (弱酸性ミリオンアーサー) as Twinblade Arthur_{(ep 52, 54)} (2018)
- 15 Sai, Kyō Kara Dōsei Hajimemasu (15歳､今日から同棲はじめます｡) as Nari Miyahara (宮原成) (2018)
- MILGRAM (-ミルグラム-) as Futa Kajiyama (2020–Present)
- Lego Ninjago Shinryaku no AI-hen (レゴニンジャゴー 侵略のAI編) as Scott (スコット) (2020)
- iichiko story: Kimi to Iru Keshiki (君といる景色) as Haruto Yamamoto (山本 晴人) (2021)

=== Video games ===
2012

- Hime Gal Paradise: Mechikawa! Age Mori Sensation! (姫ギャルパラダイス メチカワ! アゲ盛り↑センセーション!) _{(Nintendo 3DS)} as Kyo Hanafusa (花房恭)

2015

- Go nin no Koi Prince: Himitsu no Keiyaku Kekkon (5人の恋プリンス〜ヒミツの契約結婚〜) _{(iOS, Android, PS Vita)} as Will Bartle (ウィル・バートル)
- Kobayashi ga kawai sugite tsurai ~tsu! ! Game demo kyun moe makkusu ga tomarana i~tsu _{(Nintendo 3DS)} as Moyuyu's younger brother (もゆゆの舎弟)
- Royal Flash Heroes (ロイヤルフラッシュヒーローズ) _{(iOS, Android)} as Takuto Fargan (タクト・ファルガン), Restio Kohaku (レスティオ・コハク)
- Shōjo to Dragon: Genjuu Keiyaku Cryptract (少女とドラゴン -幻獣契約クリプトラクト-) _{(Windows, PS Vita, PS4)} as Azazel (アザゼル), Klaus (クラウス), Farang (ファラン)
- Valiant Knights (ヴァリアントナイツ) _{(iOS, Android)} as Clair Macbeth (マクベス=クレアール)

2016

- Aikatsu! Photo on Stage!! (アイカツ! フォトonステージ!!) _{(iOS, Android)} as Kanata Kira (吉良かなた)
- The Alchemist Code (誰ガ為のアルケミスト, Ta ga Tame no Alchemist; lit. For Whom The Alchemist Exists) _{(iOS, Android)} as Richie (リッシュ)
- Dragon Genesis: Seisen no Kizuna (ドラゴンジェネシス -聖戦の絆-) _{(iOS, Android)} as Tyrant Nero (暴君ネロ)
- Dragon Hunter COOP (ドラゴンハンターCOOP) _{(iOS, Android)} as Player voice (プレイヤーボイス)
- Gyakuten Othellonia (逆転オセロニア) _{(iOS, Android)} as Legus (レグス), Lion the Shishigami King
- Haikyū!! Donpisha Match!! (ハイキュー!!ドンピシャマッチ!!) _{(iOS, Android)} as Shinji Watari (渡親治)
- Icchibanketsu ONLINE (一血卍傑 -ONLINE-) _{(Windows)} as Kagutsuchi (カグツチ)
- Knight Slinger (ナイトスリンガー) _{(iOS, Android)} as Saturn (サターン), Mare (マーレ)
- Kyun PON! (きゅんPON！) _{(iOS, Android)} as Basil (バジル), Lyon (リヨン)
- Magic-kyun! Renaissance _{(PS Vita)} as Charles (シャルル)
- Puzzle & Dragons X: Gods Chapter/Dragons Chapter _{(Nintendo 3DS)}
- Sangokushi Monogatari (三国志ものがたり) _{(iOS)} as Gan Ning (甘寧), Guan Ping (関平), Mi Fang (糜芳)
- Shōmetsu Toshi: Everything in its right place (消滅都市; lit. Annihilation City) _{(iOS, Android)} as Core (コア), Egg (エッグ)
- Shōmetsu Toshi 2: The other side of love (消滅都市 2; lit. Annihilation City 2) _{(iOS, Android)} as Yuki's father (ユキの父親)
- Shutsugeki! Shiritsu Ebisu Chūgaku Busō Fūki iinkai (出撃！私立恵比寿中学 武装風紀委員会) _{(iOS, Android)} as Kotarō Kyūkan (球間小太郎), Silver (シルバー)
- SOUL REVERSE ZERO (ソウルリバース ゼロ) _{(iOS, Android)} as Hercules (ヘラクレス), Jo'chi Qasar (ジョチ・カサル), Kay (ケイ), Charles V (シャルル5世), Roland (ローラン), Gilgamesh (ギルガメッシュ)
- Valkyrie Anatomia: The Origin _{(iOS, Android)} as Alt Fail (アルトフェイル)
- World Cross Saga: Toki to Shōjo to Kagami no Tobira (ワールドクロスサーガ -時と少女と鏡の扉-) _{(iOS, Android)} as Mordred (モルドレッド)

2017

- Akashic Re:cords (アカシックリコード) _{(iOS, Android)} as Saitō Hajime (斉藤一), Edgar Arketi (エドガー・アーケティ)
- Avatar Mate (アバターメイト)
- DESTINY CHILD (デスティニーチャイルド) _{(iOS, Android)} as Self-Righteous Aten (独善的なアテン)
- DUELS X MACHINA (デュエルエクスマキナ) _{(iOS, Android)} as Raphael (ラファエル), Anubis (アヌビス)
- Ensemble Stars! (あんさんぶるスターズ！) x Merc StoriA: Majutsushi to Suzu no Shirabe (メルクストーリア -癒術士と鈴のしらべ-) Special Collaboration Event _{(iOS, Android)} as Teufel (トイフェル)
- Gensō Shōjo (幻想少女) _{(iOS, Android)} as Male Protagonist (主人公〈男〉)
- Isekai de Cafe o Kaiten Shimashita (異世界でカフェを開店しました。) _{(iOS, Android)} as Renard Fascino (ルナール・ファシノ)
- Million Arthur: Arcana Blood (ミリオンアーサー アルカナブラッド) _{(Arcade, PS4)} as Twinblade Arthur (二刀アーサー)

2018

- BORDER BREAK _{(PS4)} as Kyle (カイル), Simon (サイモン)
- Chain Strike (チェーンストライク) _{(iOS, Android)} as Lucian (ルシアン)
- Court of Darkness (魔界王子と魅惑のナイトメア, Makai Ōji to Miwaku no Nightmare) _{(iOS, Android)} as Toa Qelsum (トア・キフェル)
- Eto Kare ～Jūnishi ni Neko ga Moreta Riyū～ (干支かれ ～十二支に猫が漏れた理由～) _{(iOS, Android)} as Hisame (氷雨（ひさめ）)
- GESTALT ODIN (ゲシュタルト・オーディン) _{(iOS, Android)} as Twinblade Arthur (二刀アーサー)
- IDOL FANTASY _{(iOS, Android) as} Chikahito Mitsuki (観月 智佳仁)
- Monster Strike (モンスターストライク) _{(iOS, Android)} as Kay (ケイ)
- Op8♪ (Op8♪/オーピーエイト) _{(iOS, Android)} as Miyabi Yotsuya (四ッ谷 雅)
- Palette Parade (パレットパレード) _{(iOS, Android, Windows)} as Alfred Sisley (シスレー)
- SOUL REVERSE (ソウルリバース) _{(Arcade)} as Caesar (カエサル), Crom Cruach (クロウ・クルワッハ)

2019

- Gothic wa Mahou Otome (ゴシックは魔法乙女) as Pulcher (プルケル), Malé (マレ)
- Hero's Park (ヒーロー'sパーク) _{(iOS, Android)} as Natsuki Mikado (帝 夏月)
- Kaikan Phrase CLIMAX Next Generation (快感 フレーズ CLIMAX -NEXT GENERATION-; lit. Sensual Phrase CLIMAX Next Generation) _{(iOS, Android)} as Kanae Kanzaki (神崎 夏向) (October 15, 2019 – May 31, 2021)
- Quiz RPG: The World of Mystic Wiz _{(iOS, Android, Windows)} as Sushi Cyborg Tetsu (スシサイボーグのテツ), Bean fairy Topuru (豆の妖精トプル), Tetsu's father (テツの父親), Dr. Osushi (オスシ博士)
- The Misanthropic Girl (虚無と物質の彼女)_{(Windows)} as Ryō Hasaba (枷場 亮)

2020

- Argonavis from BanG Dream! AAside _{(iOS, Android)} as Felix Louis-Claude Mont D'or (フェリクス・ルイ=クロード・モンドール)
- Engage Souls (エンゲージソウルズ) _{(iOS, Android)} as Shuusei (シュウセイ)
- HELIOS Rising Heroes (エリオスライジングヒーローズ) _{(iOS, Android)} as Faith Beams (フェイス・ビームス)
- King's Raid _{(iOS, Android)} as Evan (エヴァン)
- Last Origin (ラストオリジン) _{(iOS, Android)} as Drone 08 (ドローン08), CT2199W Fallen (CT2199Wフォールン)
- MapleStory as Adele (Male)
- StellaVis (ステラービース) _{(iOS, Android)} as Benon Yannick (ヴェノン・ヤニーク)

2021

- Brave Frontier ReXona (ブレイブ フロンティア レゾナ) _{(iOS, Android)} as Regil (レギル)
- Dragon Quest X as Milore (ミローレ)
- Paradigm Paradox _{(Nintendo Switch)} as Hyūga (日向)

2022

- Fire Emblem Heroes _{(iOS, Android)} as Hugh (ヒュウ)
- Quiz RPG: The World of Mystic Wiz _{(iOS, Android, Windows)} as Astaroth (アスタロト)

=== Drama CD ===
2014

- My Magic Fridays (猫と私の金曜日) as Announcer (アナウンス)

2015

- 81 Produce 35th Anniversary Audio Drama CD: Shiden-kai no Taka (81プロデュース35周年記念企画オーディオドラマCD「紫電改のタカ」) as Taiga (タイガー・モスキトン)

2016

- Kimi no Ōdō (キミの王道) as Rehm (レーム)
- Zutto Isshodayo... (ずっと一緒だよ...) as Tarō Nakamura (中村太郎)

2017

- EXIT TUNES PRESENTS ACTORS 6 as Satoru Nijō (二条 佐斗流)

2018

- Hinekure Sakura ni Koi ga Saku (ひねくれさくらに恋が咲く) _{(BLCD)} as Tsukasa Yukihira (雪平 司)
- Ikiteru Dake de Homete Kureru CD (生きてるだけで褒めてくれるCD) as Andrei (アンドレイ=ヴァジュニーチン)
- Nama Haishin: Aitsu ni Koi Shite Mita! (【生配信】あいつに恋してみた！) _{(BLCD)} as Yoshirō Tanuma (田沼 芳朗 / よしろー)

2019

- 8P Drama CD: Monster Cafe (8P（エイトピース）ドラマCD「モンスターカフェ」) as Frankenstein's Monster
- ACTORS Extra Edition 8 as Satoru Nijō (二条 佐斗流)
- Hien Senki 〜Mekki Fukkatsu-hen〜 (氷炎戦記 〜滅鬼復活編〜)
- JAZZ-ON! Sessions「First Cats」 as Ray Hoshino (星乃 レイ)
- Otogi no Uta CHRONICLE: Rosen Melodie ～Aoi Bara no Senritsu～ (音戯の譜 〜CHRONICLE〜 Rosen Melodie ～蒼い薔薇の旋律～) as René Junker (レネ・ユンカー)
- Otogi no Uta CHRONICLE: 2nd series Möbius/♢WoNdeR PaRTy♦ (音戯の譜～CHRONICLE～ 2nd series 対盤（ライブバトル）編 Möbius/♢WoNdeR PaRTy♦) as René Junker (レネ・ユンカー)
- Yoidore Koi o Sezu (酔いどれ恋をせず) _{(BLCD)} as Yuzuru

2020

- EROSION 1st single from CARNELIAN BLOOD ｢From a Spicy Peak｣ Voice Drama "Dangerous Brothers" as Yoru Kuzuriha (杠葉ヨル)
- 8P Unit Song Drama CD Vol.3 Original Drama「UNPERFECT」as Julius (ユリウス)
- 8P Unit Talk CD (8P ユニットトークCD) as himself
- Arthur Lounsbery, Kento Ito's LI-PLAY! Recitation CD Spy's Act Vol.1 (ランズベリー・アーサー、伊東健人のLI-PLAY! 朗読CD Spy's Act Vol.1)
- PROJECT SCARD Drama CD Prologue as Yamato Kai (甲斐 ヤマト)
- PROJECT SCARD Drama CD Kazuma & Yamato as Yamato Kai (甲斐 ヤマト)

2021

- 8P Drama CD Heaven & Lost Vol.1 as Natsuki (ナツキ)
- 8P Drama CD Heaven & Lost Vol.2 as Natsuki (ナツキ)
- HELIOS Rising Heroes Drama CD Vol.2 West Sector as Faith Beams

2022

- 8P Drama CD: Hyakkiyakou Monogatari (8P ドラマCD「百鬼夜行物語」) as Mizuchi (蛟・青淵)

=== Audiobook ===
- Tsuki to Leica to Kyuketsu Hime (月とライカと吸血姫) as Lev Leps (レフ・レプス) (2019)
- Shiotaiou no Sato-san ga Ore ni dake Amai (塩対応の佐藤さんが俺にだけ甘い) as Sōta Oshio (2021)
- Gakuen-sha, Judgement to Seishun dorobo (学園者！～風紀委員と青春泥棒～) as Ichiki (風雲寺一騎) (2022)

=== Dubbing ===
Television series

- The Accidental Couple as Tae-won (2009)
- Foyle's War
- We Are Lady Parts as Ahsan (Zaqi Ismail)

Films

- Descendants as Chad Charming, portrayed by Jedidiah Goodacre (2015)
- Descendants 2 as Chad Charming, portrayed by Jedidiah Goodacre (2017)
- The F**k-It List (18歳の"やっちまえ"リスト) as Brett Blackmore, portrayed by Eli Brown (2020)

Animation

- DC League of Super-Pets as The Flash

=== DVD ===
- Chūmon no Ōi o Uchi Series 〜Arthur Lousnbery/Yoshiki Nakajima/Daiki Kobayashi〜 (注文の多いおうちシリーズ 〜ランズベリー・アーサー/中島ヨシキ/小林大紀〜) (2016)
- Tokimeki Recipe: Welcome to the Butler Restaurant ～Tasuku Hatanaka & Arthur Lounsbery～ (ときめきレシピ 執事レストランへようこそ ～畠中祐&ランズベリー・アーサー～) (2016)
- Event Kindan Nama Festival 69 (イベント 禁断生フェスティバル69) (2018)
- Bodoge de Asobo 2 Turn Me! Volume 3 (ボドゲであそぼ2ターンめ！第3巻) (2019)
- KENN and Arthur's Nu Camp Vol.1 – 3 (KENN・アーサーのぬーキャンプ) (2020)
- Tsumami Wa Shio Dake: On-location in Tokyo Bonfire Edition 2021 (つまみは塩だけ 東京ロケ・たき火編2021) (2021)

=== Live action ===
- Kami☆Voice: The Voice Makes a Miracle as Cristian (2011)
- cafe*soffive (2013)

=== Radio ===
2015

- Gero no THE CATCH (GeroのTHE CATCH) (October 6, 2015)
- Star-Myu Radio: Mezase! Radio Star (スタミュラジオ 〜目指せ!ラジオスター〜) _{(radio host)} (August 26, 2015 – February 10, 2016)
- Yoru no Drama House (夜のドラマハウス) (October 12–16, 2015)

2016

- Arthur, Daiki, Yoshiki no Kaleidoscope Party (アーサー・大紀・ヨシキのカレイドスコープ・パーティー) _{(radio host)} (October 25, 2016 – present)
- Gekkan Shin Otokomae Tsūshin July Issue: Gekkan Lounsbery Arthur (月刊 新・男前通信7月号～月刊 ランズベリー・アーサー) _{(radio host)} (July 2016)
- Karucha Syndrome (軽茶しんどろ〜む)_{(eps 133, 134)} (June 9–23, 2016)
- Kimi no Ōdō Web Radio (キミの王道 Webラジオ)
- Nariyuki NIGHT (なりゆきNIGHT) _{(eps 24, 26)} (July 16 – August 16, 2016)
- Washizaki Takeshi, Shirai Yūsuke no Radio X Project (鷲崎健・白井悠介のRadio X 計画) _{(eps 42, 43)} (July 17–24, 2016)

2017

- 8P Radio 〜Reading Event e no michi〜 Lounsbery Arthur & Kōsaka Atsushi-hen (生8Pラジオ 〜リーディング・イベントへの道〜 ランズ・ベリー・アーサー&火山篤志 編) (September 29, 2017)
- A&G TRIBAL RADIO Agson (A&G TRIBAL RADIO エジソン) (May 27, 2017)
- Hatanaka Tasuku no Ima, Mukatte masu!!! (畠中祐の今、向かってます!!!) (September 24, 2017)
- Hiyama Nobuyuki no Animeji-yu (檜山修之のあにめじ湯) _{(ep 156)} (May 24, 2017)
- MAN TWO MONTH RADIO: Lounsbery Arthur no Entaku no Ō o Mezashite (MAN TWO MONTH RADIO: ランズベリー・アーサーの円卓の王を目指して) _{(radio host)} (February 1 – March 29, 2017)
- Satō Takuya no Yaremasu! (佐藤拓也のやれます！) _{(ep 145–148)} (December 6–27, 2017)
- Sekai no Ō (世界の王) _{(ep 33)} (January 10, 2017)
- Star-Myu (Season 2) Web Radio: AYANAGI Star RADIO (スタミュ (第2期) webラジオ ～AYANAGI Star RADIO～) _{(radio host)} (April 4 – June 20, 2017)
- Tōma Yumi & Lounsbery Arthur no VALKYRIE -RADIO ANATOMIA- (冬馬由美&ランズベリー・アーサーのVALKYRIE -RADIO ANATOMIA-) _{(radio host)} (July 7, 2017 – December 29, 2019)
- Toriumi Kōsuke, Yasumoto Hiroki no Kindan Nama Radio (鳥海浩輔・安元洋貴の禁断生ラジオ) _{(ep 78)} (May 17, 2017)

2018

- 8P Radio 〜Shin Sekai e no Michi〜 (8P Radio ～新世界への道～) _{(ep 3)} (March 23, 2018)
- Hatanaka Tasuku to Lounsbery Arthur no Ore ni Kamawazu Sakini Ike! (中 祐とランズベリー・アーサーの俺にかまわず先に行け！) _{(radio host)} (May 7, 2018 – present)

2019

- HELIOS Rising Heroes Radio Monday Night Hero (HELIOS Rising Heroes ラジオ マンデーナイトヒーロー) _{(radio host)} (October 28, 2019 – present)
- JAZZ-ON! the radio _{(radio host)} (December 5, 2019 – present)

2020

- Argonavis from BanG Dream! AAside Radio Royale Festival (アルゴナビス from BanG Dream! AAside ラジオ・ロワイヤル・フェス) (September 2020, February 2021)
- U-nite! 81Wednesday ランズベリー・アーサー の夜明け詩 (June 2020)

=== Television and streaming programs ===
2014

- Dragon Quest X TV ver.2 (ドラゴンクエストX TV ver.2) _{(ep 11)} (December 3, 2014)
- Voice Academia (ヴォイス・アカデミア) (March 2, 2014)

2015

- Animemashite (アニメマシテ) _{(MC)} (January 13 – June 9, 2015)
- DISSIDIA Battle Coliseum (DISSIDIA バトルコロシアム) (December 15, 2015)
- Dungeon Striker: Let's Aim for the 10 Million Prize! (目指せ賞金1000万！ダンジョンストライカー) _{(MC)} (November 27 – December 9, 2015)
- LIVE B's-LOG (September 29, 2015 – January 26, 2016)
- Valiant Knights Voice Actor Variety Program: Valido! (声優バラエティー番組「バリドウ」) (September 25, 2015)

2016

- 8P channel (happy channel) (September 9, 2016 – present)
- DISSIDIA Final Fantasy: Lounsbery Arthur to Mezasu Shōri e no Michi (ランズベリー・アーサーと目指す勝利への道) _{(MC)} (July 29, 2016 – present)
- Kyō no Ryōri Monthly Live Broadcast (生放送 月刊きょうの料理) (October 2, 2016)
- Magic-kyun 4th Kyun Meeting Broadcast! (マジきゅん放送委員会 4きゅんっ！) (August 11, 2016)
- Mayonaka no Nyāgo (真夜中のニャーゴ) (June 17, 2016)
- TBS Monitoring (モニタリング): Impossible Voice Actor Audition (April 7, 2016)
- ZIP: Handsome Voice Actor Phenomenon (ZIP 声優イケメン化現象) (October 19, 2016)

2017

- Animate Cafe Channel (アニメイトカフェchannel) _{(MC)} (April 27, 2017 – March 31, 2018)
- DISSIDIA Battle Coliseum 4th (DISSIDIA バトルコロシアム 4th) (February 11, 2017)
- DISSIDIA Battle Coliseum 7th (DISSIDIA バトルコロシアム 第7回) (October 21, 2017)
- DFF Official National Online Competition 2017 Final Tournament (DFF「公式全国オンライン大会2017」決勝トーナメント) (July 16, 2017)
- DISSIDIA Final Fantasy NT Official Live Broadcast (「ディシディア ファイナルファンタジー NT」公式生放送) (October 24, 2017)
- Famitsu Gamers DX (ファミ通ゲーマーズDX) _{(ep 44)} (May 25, 2017)
- Famitsu Gamers DX ～LEVEL7～ (ファミ通ゲーマーズDX ～LEVEL7～) (July 1, 2017)
- haco+ Lounsbery Arthur (ハコプラ ランズベリー・アーサー) (June 4, 2017)
- Kissa Yasumoto (喫茶安元) _{(ep 4)} (August 7, 2017)
- Million Arthur Arcana Blood: TakumaP no Bura Bura Bura tto Hōsō (『ミリオンアーサー アルカナブラッド』琢磨Pのぶらぶらぶらっと放送) (August 31, 2017 – present)
- Santaku!!! (江口拓也・八代拓のさんたく!!! -3択バラエティ-) (June 24, 2017)
- Soul Zero Channel (ソルゼロch) _{(ep 1)} (January 25, 2017)
- Yorozuya All Trades (よろず屋オールトレーズ) (January 29, 2017)

2018

- Comic BAR Renta! (コミック BAR Renta!) _{(ep 62, 63)} (March 7–14, 2018)
- Koko tte Nihon desu ka? (ここって日本ですか？)
- Karaoke MAX Special Program (カラオケMAX特番) (February 8–18, 2018)
- Tensai Terrible-kun YOU (天才てれびくんYOU) (April 16, 2018)

2019

- Arthur's Indie Game Story (アーサーのインディーゲーム物語) _{(MC)}
- Bodoge Cafe Tadaima Kaiten kaigi-chū! ! (ボドゲカフェ ただいま開店会議中!!) _{(MC)}
- LIPSS Innocent na Sasayaki (LIPSS～イノセントな囁き～) _{(main cast)}
- Makai Ōji to Miwaku no Nightmare: Makanai! Channel (『魔界王子と魅惑のナイトメア』まかナイ！チャンネル) _{(MC)}
- Min'na de kataru bangumi katari po (みんなで語る番組かたりぽ)

2020

- Ichinyanyan Live (いちにゃにゃらいぶ) as Nyantarou the Former Stray Cat (元野良猫 にゃんたろう) (February 22, 2020)
- Komada Wataru no Komastagram (駒田航のKomastagram) _{(ep 7)} (January 9, 2020)
- Project Scard TV (プロスカTV)

2021

- All Night Seiyuu Fuji (オールナイト声優フジ-ALLNIGHT SAY YOU FUJI-) (January 23, 2021)
- Maison de Aoharu (メゾン・ド・アオハル) (September 2021 – present) _{(MC)}

=== Multimedia project ===
- Koisuru Oyasumi Call (恋するおやすみコール) as Kaname Bergman (バーグマン 要)
- Shirosaki Kōkoku (城崎広告; lit. Shirosaki Advertising Agency) as Kengo Hishinogi (菱乃木 賢悟)
- Visual Boy: Voice Actor side
- Watashitachi wa Seiyoku ga Gaman Dekinai (私たち、欲しがり適齢期。) as Sora Ashida (芦田 宙)
- Anime Beans (アニメビーンズ )
  - Live-action movie "Room Date" (実写ムービー「部屋デート編」) (August 17, 2018)
  - Chō! Anime Beans (超！アニメビーンズ) (September 14, 2018)
  - Lounsbery Athur no ima shichu (ランズベリー・アーサー の今シチュ) (May 11, 2019)
  - Koi shichu (恋シチュ)
- comico
  - Voice comic "Mr. Kobayashi in the seat next to me" (ボイスコミック『となりの席の小林さん。』) as Akira Takizawa (滝沢 晃)
- The Last Metal as Jun Hasumi (2021)
- Yoshimaho Project as A-2 (2021)
- Maison Half-Dozen (メゾン ハンダース) as Black Cat (黒猫) (2021)
- Starry Palette (スターリィパレット) as Jin Natori (南鳥ジン) (2021)

=== Magazines and Photo Books ===
- 8P Photo Book
- Musical Star-Myu team Otori Photo Book
- Prince Animage 2014 spring (プリンスアニメージュ 2014 spring) (April 3, 2014)
- VOICE Newtype No. 058 (December 24, 2015)
- Seiyū JUNON vol.3 (声優 JUNON vol.3) (January 15, 2016)
- spoon.2Di vol.23 (February 27, 2017)
- JUNON May 2017 Issue (JUNON 2017年 05月号) (March 23, 2017)
- spoon.2Di vol.26 (May 31, 2017)
- Voice Animage No. 36 (ボイスアニメージュ No. 36) (October 10, 2017)
- Animedia October 2018 Issue (アニメディア 2018年 10月号) (September 10, 2018)

== Theatre ==
=== Musical ===
- Musical Star-Myu (ミュージカル「スタミュ」) as Kaito Tsukigami at Zepp Blue Theater Roppongi in Tokyo (April 1–9, 2017) and Morinomiya Piloti Hall in Osaka, Japan (April 15–16, 2017)
- Musical Star-Myu Second Season (ミュージカル「スタミュ」-2ndシーズン-) as Kaito Tsukigami at Nippon Seinenkan Hall in Tokyo (July 4–11, 2018) and Morinomiya Piloti Hall in Osaka, Japan (July 20–22, 2018)

=== Stage reading ===
- 81 Live Salon
- STUDIO La Neige: Recitation event "Jouer du cygne PART 1 ～Inside memory～" (朗読イベント『Jouer du cygne PART1 ～インサイド・メモリー～』) (February 11, 2015) (Hajime)
- Theatrick (Theatrick第一弾『新米助手の計らずも悩ましい一日』) (January 13–18, 2015)
- Japanese literature masterpiece selection third volume "Kokoro" (日本文学名作選 第三弾「こゝろ」) (February 18, 2017) (K)
- Cinderella Saiban ～Ai wa Akai Doku～ (シンデレラ裁判 ～愛は赤い毒～; lit. Cinderella Trial ～Love is Red Poison～) (May 19–28, 2017)
- Nazotoki wa Dinner no Ato de (謎解きはディナーのあとで; lit. The After-Dinner Mysteries) (November 25–26, 2017; April 28–29 and May 5, 2018)
- POWER OF VOICE ～Rōdoku kara Rakugo, Musei Eiga made Vol.2～ (POWER OF VOICE ～朗読から落語、無声映画までVol.2～) (November 11, 2017)
- Sumaho o otoshita dakenanoni (スマホを落としただけなのに) (January 29, February 1, 2019)
- Libra! 〜The Lie for Bracing you〜 (リブラ！〜the Lie for Bracing you〜) as Sōjirō Takamatsu (高松総二郎) (September 12–13, 2019)
- Shishunki Bitter Change (思春期ビターチェンジ) (October 19, 2019)
- Sumaho o otoshita dakenanoni toraware no satsujinki (スマホを落としただけなのに 囚われの殺人鬼) (January 13–18, 2020)
- Omoide wa Konbīfu ni Nosete (想い出はコンビーフに乗せて) as Asa Takaoka (高岡亜沙) (February 20, 2020)

== Discography ==
=== CD ===
| Release date | Title | Role / Project | Sources |
|---|---|---|---|
| August 5, 2015 | Star-Myu First Drama CD ☆☆Forever★STAGE☆☆: Eien★STAGE (永遠★STAGE; lit. Forever★STAGE) _{(group)} | Kaito Tsukigami / Star-Myu | |
| October 21, 2015 | Star-Myu Musical Song Series ☆SHOW TIME 3☆: Limited sky _{(solo)} | Kaito Tsukigami / Star-Myu | |
| November 4, 2015 | Star-Myu Musical Song Series ☆SHOW TIME 5☆: Gojūsō ～Quintet～ (五重奏～クインテット～; lit. Quintet ～Quintet～) _{(group)} | Kaito Tsukigami / Star-Myu | |
| November 11, 2015 | Star-Myu Musical Song Series ☆SHOW TIME 6☆: Ayanagi Show Time ～Otori Arrange Ver.～ (アヤナギ・ショウ・タイム～鳳アレンジVer.～) _{(group)} | Kaito Tsukigami / Star-Myu | |
| November 25, 2015 | Star-Myu Musical Song Series ☆SHOW TIME 8☆: Ready→Stedy→Dream! _{(group)} | Kaito Tsukigami / Star-Myu | |
| December 9, 2015 | Star-Myu Musical Song Series ☆SHOW TIME 10☆: Hoshikuzu Movement (屑ムーブメント; lit. Stardust Movement) _{(group)} | Kaito Tsukigami / Star-Myu | |
| December 16, 2015 | Star-Myu Musical Song Series ☆SHOW TIME 11☆: Moonlight(s):Episode _{(duo)} | Kaito Tsukigami / Star-Myu | |
| December 23, 2015 | Star-Myu Musical Song Series ☆SHOW TIME 12☆: Seishun COUNTDOWN (星瞬COUNTDOWN) _{(group)}; Seishun COUNTDOWN～Tsukigami Solo Ver.～ (星瞬COUNTDOWN～月皇ソロVer.～) _{(solo)} | Kaito Tsukigami / Star-Myu | |
| February 1, 2017 | EXIT TUNES PRESENTS ACTORS6: Dokusen'yoku (毒占欲; lit. Mono Poisoner) _{(solo)}; Barerī Ko (バレリーコ; lit. Ballerina Girl) _{(duo)}; Kyō mo Harebare (きょうもハレバレ; lit. Today is Cheerful too) _{(group)} | Satoru Nijō / ACTORS | |
| April 18, 2017 | Star-Myu Musical Song Series ☆2nd SHOW TIME 3☆: Aozora SEASON (青空SEASON; lit. Blue Sky SEASON) _{(quartet)} | Kaito Tsukigami / Star-Myu | |
| May 3, 2017 | Star-Myu Musical Song Series ☆2nd SHOW TIME 5☆: straightforward _{(trio)} | Kaito Tsukigami / Star-Myu | |
| May 10, 2017 | 8P channel 2 OP&ED CD: 01. Jumping Smile (Opening Theme) _{(group)}; 02. FULL VOLUME!! (Ending Theme) _{(group)} | Himself / 8P | |
| June 14, 2017 | Star-Myu Musical Song Series ☆2nd SHOW TIME 11☆: Growin' Up _{(group)} | Kaito Tsukigami / Star-Myu | |
| June 21, 2017 | Star-Myu Musical Song Series ☆2nd SHOW TIME 12☆: Gift ～Team Otori Ver.～ _{(group)}; Gift ～Curtain Call～ _{(group)} | Kaito Tsukigami / Star-Myu | |
| August 9, 2017 | Aikatsu Stars! Special Single: Bokura no Kiseki (僕らの奇跡; lit. Our Miracle) _{(group)}; Bokura no Kiseki ～Kanata Solo Ver.～ (僕らの奇跡 ～かなたソロ Ver.～) _{(solo)} | Kanata Kira / Aikatsu Stars! | |
| August 9, 2017 | 8P Unit Song CD Vol.3 Arthur Lounsbery & Atsushi Kōsaka: 01. fate ～Kiken na Kaori～ (fate ～危険な香り～; lit. fate ～Dangerous Fragrance～) _{(duo)}; 02. FREE _{(solo)} | Himself / 8P | |
| December 20, 2017 | ACTORS -Songs Collection 2-: Tokyo Teddy Bear (東京テディベア) _{(solo)} | Satoru Nijō / ACTORS | |
| March 7, 2018 | Arcade 2D Fighting Game "Million Arthur: Arcana Blood" Character Song: Drive Away _{(solo)} | Twinblade Arthur / Million Arthur: Arcana Blood | |
| April 18, 2018 | Sore ja, Yoroshiku (Type-A) (それじゃ、よろしく (Type-A)): Sore ja, Yoroshiku (Eto Kare Seiyuu ver) (それじゃ、よろしく (干支かれ声優ver)) _{(duo)} | Hisame / Eto Kare | |
| July 18, 2018 | Musical Star-Myu 2nd Season Original Song Album: Yume・Iro ～Musical Ver.～ (ユメ・イロ～Musical Ver.～; lit. Dream・Color ～Musical Ver.～) _{(group)}; &BEGINNING _{(group)}; Delight Song _{(group)}; Re STARTER! _{(group)}; Back up for you! _{(duo)}; Kick-Start☆ (キックスタート☆) _{(group)}; C☆ngratulations! (Musical Ver.) _{(group)} | Kaito Tsukigami / Star-Myu | |
| November 7, 2018 | 8P Mini-album「CV」: 01. Come on a my cafe _{(quartet)}; 04. I still ... _{(duo)} | Himself / 8P | |
| December 2, 2018 | Shirosaki Advertising Agency Company Anthem CD (城崎広告 社歌 CD): SYAIN⇄SHINE _{(group)} | Kengo Hishinogi / Shirosaki Advertising Agency | |
| February 13, 2019 | IDOL FANTASY Songs「ALEX Knights」 REAL×FANTASY / 視線=プリズム / Across the Road〜僕ら繋ぐ道〜: REAL×FANTASY _{(group)} | Chikahito Mitsuki / IDOL FANTASY | |
| February 13, 2019 | IDOL FANTASY Songs「BRAVE HEARTS」StoryBook FANTASIA / JUSTICE: StoryBook FANTASIA _{(group)}; StoryBook FANTASIA (Chikahito Mitsuki Ver.) _{(solo)}; JUSTICE _{(group)}; JUSTICE (Chikahito Mitsuki Ver.) _{(solo)} | Chikahito Mitsuki / IDOL FANTASY | |
| June 26, 2019 | 8P Mini-album「Animals' Parade」: 01. Animals' Parade (アニマルズ・パレード) _{(group)}; 04. Animals' Parade ～Build my Dream～ (アニマルズ・パレード ～Build my Dream～) _{(duo)} | Himself / 8P | |
| August 21, 2019 | ACTORS -Extra Edition 8-: Fixer (フィクサー) _{(solo)} | Satoru Nijō / ACTORS | |
| August 23, 2019 | Happy Glitter: 04. Light-blue Wind _{(solo)}; 09. Happy Glitter _{(group)} | Himself / 8P | |
| March 25, 2020 | JAZZ-ON! Sessions Raining Cats: 02. Lonely Junction _{(duo)}; 03. SwingCATS Drama Tracks #3; 04. SwingCATS Drama Tracks #4 | Rei Hoshino / JAZZ-ON! | |
| March 25, 2020 | JEALOUSYS: 03. Galaxy Dream _{(group)}; 04. Spark in the night _{(group)} | Kanae Kanzaki / Kaikan Phrase CLIMAX | |
| April 13, 2020 | 8P「Heaven & Lost」: 白羽根のKrieger _{(group)} | Himself / 8P | |
| May 20, 2020 | ACTORS -Singing Contest Edition- sideB: 04. Idola no Circus (イドラのサーカス) _{(solo)} | Satoru Nijō / ACTORS | |
| July 22, 2020 | 8P Unit Song Drama CD Vol.3: 08. What Is Human? _{(duo)} | Himself / 8P | |
| July 22, 2020 | 5-Vocal-Band "EROSION" 1st Single from CARNELIAN BLOOD: 01. (INTRO) Vigilante _{(group)}; 02. From a Spicy Peak _{(group)}; 03. Underdogs _{(group)}; 04. Voice Drama "Dangerous Brothers" | Yoru Kuzuriha / CARNELIAN BLOOD | |
| September 23, 2020 | 5-Vocal-Band "EROSION" 2nd Single from CARNELIAN BLOOD: 01. (Intro) Lighthouse _{(group)}; 02. Aspiration _{(group)}; 03. The Oath _{(group)}; 04. Voice Drama 「Exciting School Life」 | Yoru Kuzuriha / CARNELIAN BLOOD | |
| September 25, 2020 | Fantôme Iris Digital Single 「histoire」: 01. histoire _{(group)}; 02. Monokuro no Kisu (モノクロのキス; lit. Monochrome Kiss) _{(SID cover)} _{(Black Butler opening theme)} _{(group)}; 03. Voice Drama 「histoire des vampires」 | Felix Louis-Claude Mont D'or / Argonavis from BanG Dream! | |
| September 30, 2020 | MILGRAM 4th Single: Bring It On: 01. Bring It On (事変上等) _{(solo)}; 03. Mozaik Role -Futa Cover- (モザイクロール -フータ Cover-) _{(solo)}; 05. Braze you!! -Voice Drama- ES & Futa | Futa Kajiyama / MILGRAM | |
| October 7, 2020 | HELIOS Rising Heroes Ending Theme Vol.1: 02. Casual new adventure _{(trio)}; 04. Original Drama Track 「夜ひとりでトイレに行けなくなる話」 | Faith Beams / HELIOS Rising Heroes | |
| November 25, 2020 | 5-Vocal-Band "EROSION" 3rd Single from CARNELIAN BLOOD: 01. RAD HEAD _{(group)}; 02. Get Out!!!!! _{(group)}; 03. (Outro) Sham'ing _{(group)}; 04. Voice Drama 「Happy School Festival」 | Yoru Kuzuriha / CARNELIAN BLOOD | |
| December 9, 2020 | Gin no Yuri/ Banzai RIZING!!!/ Hikari no Akuma ＜Atype＞: 01. Gin no Yuri (銀の百合; lit. Silver Lily) _{(group)}; 04. histoire _{(group)}; 05. Yuuwaku (誘惑; lit. Temptation) _{(GLAY cover) (group)}; 06. Voice Drama「histoire des vampires」 | Felix Louis-Claude Mont D'or / Argonavis from BanG Dream! | |
| December 23, 2020 | PROJECT SCARD Character Song Kazuma & Yamato: 01. Clumsy _{(duo)}; 03. Clumsy (Kiyoshi Sugo remix) _{(solo)}; 05. After Interview (Yamato version) | Yamato Kai / PROJECT SCARD | |
| December 30, 2020 | MICHII HARUKA×BVDDHASTEP 1st FULL ALBUM "Howling": 03. JADE feat. Arthur Lounsbery _{(duo)} | Himself | |
| January 6, 2021 | ACTORS -Deluxe Dream Edition-: Disk 2_Track 09. How-To Sekai Seifuku (ハウトゥー世界征服; lit. World Domination How-To) _{(duo)} | Satoru Nijō / ACTORS | |
| February 3, 2021 | AAside (album): 01. AAside _{(group)} | Felix Louis-Claude Mont D'or / Argonavis from BanG Dream! | |
| February 24, 2021 | Project Scard: Scar on the Praeter opening theme: 01. Scar on the Praeter _{(group)}; 02. Scar on the Praeter (yuzen remix) _{(group)}; 03. Scar on the Praeter (KTG remix) _{(group)} | Yamato Kai / PROJECT SCARD | |
| March 14, 2021 | Fantôme Iris Digital Single 「Hitsugi no Naka C'est La Vie」: Hitsugi no Naka C'est La Vie (棺の中のセラヴィ; lit. C'est La Vie From Inside the Coffin) _{(group)} | Felix Louis-Claude Mont D'or / Argonavis from BanG Dream! | |
| May 5, 2021 | Invisible Chord 2nd: 01. Invisible Chord 2nd _{(group)} | Ray Hoshino / JAZZ-ON! | |
| June 2, 2021 | Tone of Stars Beta: 03. We are here _{(duo)} | Ray Hoshino / JAZZ-ON! | |
| June 30, 2021 | 1st ALBUM from CARNELIAN BLOOD *Normal Ver. Track Listing: 01. What is mine _{(group)}; 02. Vigrante _{(group)}; 03. From a Spicy Peak _{(group)}; 04. Underdogs _{(group)}; 05. Lighthouse _{(group)}; 06. Aspiration _{(group)}; 07. The Oath _{(group)}; 08. RAD HEAD _{(group)}; 09. Get Out!!!!! _{(group)}; 10. Sha'ming _{(group)}; 11. Secret Track _{(group)}; *Ecstasy Ver. Exclusive Track: 02. The Sun Also Rises _{(group)} *Crazy Ver. Exclusive Track: 02. CRIER!! CRIER!! _{(group)} | Yoru Kuzuriha / CARNELIAN BLOOD | |
| June 30, 2021 | 8P Mini-album 「CV:2」: 02. Shirohane no Krieger (白羽根のKrieger, lit. Krieger of White Feather) _{(group)}; 03. Clover's Xmas _{(group)}; 05. Maple Girl!Maple Boy _{(duo)} | Himself / 8P | |
| July 14, 2021 | Fantôme Iris 1st Single 「Zakuro / Kyōki no Melody」: 01. Zakuro (ザクロ; lit. Pomegranate) _{(group)}; 02. Kyōki no Melody (狂喜のメロディ; lit. Melody of Ecstasy) _{(group)} | Felix Louis-Claude Mont D'or / Argonavis from BanG Dream! | |
| July 28, 2021 | HELIOS Rising Heroes Ending Theme Vol.4: 01. GROWING THINGS _{(duo)}; 03. Original Drama Track 「Love and Peace UNO Battle」 | Faith Beams / HELIOS Rising Heroes | |
| July 28, 2021 | Course of my fate: 01. Course of my fate _{("Paradigm Paradox" theme song)} _{(group)}; 03. FROM THIS PLACE _{("Paradigm Paradox" ending theme)} _{(quartet)}; 06. Mini drama 「Their daily life Ibuki&Hyūga&Yukinami Arc」 | Hyūga / Paradigm Paradox | |
| August 1, 2021 | Digimon Adventure 02 Best Partner "Kizuna" 2 Ichijouji Ken & Wormmon: 01. Never Ending _{(solo)}; 03. Forever Adolescence _{(duo)} | Ken Ichijouji / Digimon Adventure | |
| August 30, 2021 | The Last Empire (Single): 01. The Last Empire _{(trio)} | Hokuto / BURNS SKOOL | |
| November 17, 2021 | ARGONAVIS Cover Collection-Mix-: 05. Uso (嘘; lit. Lie) _{(SID cover)} _{(Fullmetal Alchemist Brotherhood 1st ending theme) (group)}; 06. the WORLD _{(Nightmare cover) (Death Note 1st opening theme) (group)}; 07. 1/3 no Junjō na Kanjō (1/3の純情な感情; lit. 1/3 of Pure Feelings) _{(Siam Shade cover) (Rurouni Kenshin 6th ending theme) (group)}; 08. Nirvana (ニルヴァーナ) _{(MUCC cover) (Inu x Boku SS opening theme) (group)} | Felix Louis-Claude Mont D'or / Argonavis from BanG Dream! | |
| December 22, 2021 | Fantôme Iris 2nd Single 「Pierrot」: 01. Pierrot (ピエロ) _{(group)}; 02. Into the Flame _{(group)}; 03. Spooky Halloween Night _{(group)} | Felix Louis-Claude Mont D'or / Argonavis from BanG Dream! | |
| December 22, 2021 | EROSION with YOU Vol.1 CREHA: 01. FIREMIND _{(group)} | Yoru Kuzuriha / CARNELIAN BLOOD | |
| January 26, 2022 | EROSION with YOU Vol.2 BYAKUYA: 01. Devil's Dinner _{(group)} | Yoru Kuzuriha / CARNELIAN BLOOD | |
| January 26, 2022 | Venomous 8 1st Single「Welcome to the Deadlight City」: 01. Welcome to the Deadlight City _{(group)}; 02. R.I.P. _{(group)} | Jun Hasumi / The Last Metal | |
| February 3, 2022 | BLASSKAIZ 1st Unit Song: 01. Reine Seele _{(duo)} | René Junker / Otogi no Uta CHRONICLE | |
| February 23, 2022 | EROSION with YOU Vol.3 NEIGHT: 01. NEVER LET "U" GO _{(group)} | Yoru Kuzuriha / CARNELIAN BLOOD | |
| March 16, 2022 | un:Mizeria (Single): 01. un:Mizeria _{(group)} | Felix Louis-Claude Mont D'or / Argonavis from BanG Dream! | |
| March 23, 2022 | EROSION with YOU Vol.4 YORU: 01. OneThing _{(group)}; 02. Determination _{(solo)} | Yoru Kuzuriha / CARNELIAN BLOOD | |
| August 24, 2022 | HELIOS Rising Heroes 1st Full Album: 03. Casual new adventure _{(trio)}; 07. GROWING THINGS _{(duo)}; 11. Nameless Anger _{(trio)} | Faith Beams / HELIOS Rising Heroes | Apple Music |
| November 23, 2022 | Eternal Boys Stage 1: 02. FRIENDS _{(group)} | Junjie Lin / Eternal Boys | |

=== Radio CD ===
| Release date | Title | Sources |
|---|---|---|
| January 27, 2016 | Star-Myu Radio: Mezase! Radio Star (スタミュラジオ〜目指せ!ラジオスター〜) | |
| March 30, 2016 | Star-Myu Radio: Mezase! Radio Star Vol.2 (スタミュラジオ〜目指せ!ラジオスター〜 Vol.2) | |
| May 31, 2017 | DJCD Star-Myu (Season 2) Web Radio ～AYANAGI Star RADIO～ (DJCD 「スタミュ(第2期)webラジオ ～AYANAGI star RADIO～」) | |
| September 27, 2017 | Radio CD Star-Myu (Season 2) Web Radio ～AYANAGI Star RADIO～ (ラジオCD「スタミュ(第2期)webラジオ ～AYANAGI star RADIO～」) | |
| November 20, 2020 | 8P Unit Talk CD | |
| May 26, 2021 | Radio CD HELIOS Rising Heroes Radio Monday Night Heroes (ラジオCD HELIOS Rising Heroes ラジオ マンデーナイトヒーロー) | |

=== Other performances ===
| Song title | Role / Project |
|---|---|
| C.A.L.L.I.N.G _{(group)}; VOICE OF LOVE _{(group)}; Kimi No Kaeru Basho (君の帰る場所; lit. The Place Where You Return) _{(group)} | Himself / soffive |
| Yume・Iro ～team Otori Ver.～ (ユメ・イロ～team鳳Ver.～; lit. Dream・Color ～team Otori Ver.～) _{(Star-Myu OVA 1 opening theme) (group)}; C☆ngratulations！～team Otori Ver.～ _{(Star-Myu OVA 2 ending theme) (group)} | Kaito Tsukigami / Star-Myu |
| Get Wild _{(TM NETWORK cover)} _{(City Hunter 1st ending theme) (solo)} | Himself / Karaoke no LIVE DAM STADIUM (カラオケのLIVE DAM STADIUM) Anison Vocal Project (あにそんボーカル) |
| Janus _{(group)}; ROSIER _{(LUNA SEA cover) (group)}; Shinshoku -lose control- (浸食 〜lose control〜; lit. Erosion 〜lose control〜) _{(L'Arc~en~Ciel cover) (Godzilla insert song) (group)}; Vampire (ヴァンパイア) _{(Janne Da Arc cover) (group)} | Felix Louis-Claude Mont D'or / Argonavis from BanG Dream! |
| Once Upon a "yoshi-yoshi" Time _{(group)} | A-2 / Yoshimaho Project |
