= Digimon Adventure: Last Evolution Kizuna =

Digimon Adventure: Last Evolution – Kizuna
- Theatrical release poster
- Japanese: デジモンアドベンチャー Last Evolution 絆
- Revised Hepburn: Dejimon Adobenchā Rasuto Eboryūshon Kizuna
- Directed by: Tomohisa Taguchi
- Written by: Akatsuki Yamatoya
- Based on: Digimon by Akiyoshi Hongo
- Produced by: Yōsuke Kinoshita
- Starring: see below
- Cinematography: Tetsuya Kawata
- Edited by: Kentaro Tsubone
- Music by: Harumi Fuuki
- Production companies: Toei Animation (Production); Yumeta Company (Animation)
- Distributed by: Toei Company, Ltd.
- Release date: February 21, 2020
- Running time: 94 minutes
- Country: Japan
- Language: Japanese
- Box office: $24.2 million

Digimon Adventure: Last Evolution – Kizuna (Japanese: デジモンアドベンチャー Last Evolution 絆, Hepburn: Dejimon Adobenchā Rasuto Eboryūshon Kizuna) is a 2020 Japanese animated adventure film directed by Tomohisa Taguchi and written by Akatsuki Yamatoya based on the Digimon franchise by Akiyoshi Hongo. Produced by Toei Animation with animation by Yumeta Company and distributed by Toei Company, Last Evolution – Kizuna is set in the same continuity of the first two Digimon television anime series, and serves as a series finale of the original Digimon Adventure story. Last Evolution – Kizuna was released in Japan on February 21, 2020.

The feature film is a commercial success, grossing more than 24 million dollars worldwide. Due to its exploitation in limited releases in most countries of the world, and the total absence of a theatrical release in the United States, the vast majority of these revenue respectively comes from China (more than US$19 million), Japan and Hong Kong. A solid business amid the COVID-19 pandemic-related reopening process in various parts of Asia. Originally scheduled to have a limited release in the U.S. by Fathom Events, the event was cancelled due to the pandemic and its impact on cinemas; the film was released in the U.S. on home media formats on October 6, 2020. Successful in the US, it ranked third in domestic sales with over 30,000 Blu-ray copies sold in one week (95% market share).

Although Last Evolution Kizuna received little attention from film critics, it drew extremely positive reviews from the pop culture and anime media in North America, which viewed the film as a satisfactory conclusion to the Adventure arc and praised the story, the animation, the English voice acting, and the bittersweet execution of the film's themes. In Europe, experts were more severe, especially with regard to its loaded dialogues and a particular stylistic approach, susceptible to lose a large audience.

A sequel titled Digimon Adventure 02: The Beginning, which serves as the series finale of the Digimon Adventure 02 story, was released in Japanese theaters on October 27, 2023.

== Plot ==
Five years after the events of Digimon Adventure tri., Tai and the other DigiDestined are approaching adulthood; however, Tai and Matt still remain undecided about their future goals. The DigiDestined later meet Menoa Bellucci, a professor at Columbia University in New York City, and Kyotaro Imura, her bodyguard. Menoa claims that Eosmon is targeting DigiDestined around the world by robbing both them and their Digimon partners of their consciousness. With Menoa's help, Tai, Matt, Izzy, T.K., and their Digimon fight Eosmon on the Internet.

When Tai and Matt fuse their Digimon into Omnimon, their form falls apart, allowing Eosmon to escape. In the real world, Tai and Matt find countdown rings on their Digivices. Menoa explains the Digivices are powered by the infinite potential of children, and because Tai and Matt are growing up with their potential fulfilled, they have a time limit before they are separated from their Digimon forever. She also warns them that Digivolving will accelerate the countdown. While Izzy examines Eosmon's gems, Matt suspects Imura is involved with Eosmon, and asks Davis, Yolei, Cody and Ken to investigate Menoa's job in New York. Meanwhile, Gennai visits Tai and Agumon, corroborating Menoa's statement.

After Eosmon leaves Mimi unconscious, Matt gives Tai and Izzy prepaid mobile phones out of suspicion they are being tracked and also shows them a news article revealing that Menoa used to have a Digimon partner. As Matt continues to investigate Imura, he learns from Davis' group that Imura's identity is fake and Eosmon's data was found on his hard drive, deducing that he is the culprit. Izzy is sent a link to a live stream video of T.K. and Kari held hostage, prompting Tai and Matt to rescue them, while Joe goes missing. By the time they arrive, T.K. and Kari are already unconscious from Eosmon. On the way, Matt confronts Imura, who reveals his real name is Kyotaro Yamada and he is an FBI agent investigating Menoa, and he realizes that Menoa orchestrated the kidnappings and Eosmon as a distraction to target Izzy for the list of DigiDestined. Realizing this as well, Izzy texts Tai with the coordinates to Menoa's location in the Digital World, before she renders him unconscious.

In the Digital World, Menoa confirms that she lost her Digimon partner, Morphomon, prematurely from growing up, and discovered Eosmon's digi-egg during the recent aurora. To prevent the other DigiDestined from experiencing loss, she has captured their consciousness to allow them to be with their Digimon partners as children forever. Menoa sends a swarm of Eosmon clones to the real world to kidnap more DigiDestined, sparking battles worldwide. Tai, Matt, and their Digimon resolve to stop Menoa even if it quickens their separation, and Agumon and Gabumon fuse into Omnimon to fight her and the Eosmon clones. After Eosmon digivolves to its Mega level, it cuts Omnimon into pieces, causing it to split again. Tai and Matt are assaulted by the DigiDestined and their Digimon partners, but Tai awakens and turns them back to normal with Kari's whistle. While the DigiDestined and their Digimon partners join the battle, Tai, Matt, and their Digimon make one final Digivolution, forming Agumon (Bond of Courage) and Gabumon (Bond of Friendship). The two Digimon defeat Eosmon, with Menoa finding closure with Morphomon.

After the battle, Yamada arrests Menoa. Tai and Matt spend their remaining time with Agumon and Gabumon respectively, until they vanish and their Digivices turn into stone. The next spring, Tai and Matt move on with their lives and pursue their dream careers, under the belief that they may see their Digimon partners again in the future.

== Voice cast ==
The Japanese voice actors from the Digimon Adventure tri. OVA series returned to reprise their roles, as the cast from the 1999 TV series was not retained in 2015 due to Toshiko Fujita's health. As was the case with that series of films, the DigiDestined characters from Digimon Adventure 02 (now young adults) were recast with new actors while their Digimon retained their original actors. The English cast from Digimon Adventure tri., which reunited several voice actors from the original series, reprised their roles with two recast roles with Nicolas Roye replacing Vic Mignogna as Matt and Kate Higgins replacing Philece Sampler as Mimi. As for the Digidestined and their Digimon from Digimon Adventure 02, all characters were recast to new actors, except Ken, Veemon and Wormmon who retained their original actors. Internationally and in Europe, the protagonists and their respective Digimon were generally voiced by the same actors as in the original 1999 series.

Character	Japanese	English
Taichi Yagami / Taichi "Tai" Kamiya	Natsuki Hanae	Joshua Seth
Yamato Ishida / Yamato "Matt" Ishida	Yoshimasa Hosoya	Nicolas Roye
Sora Takenouchi	Suzuko Mimori	Colleen O'Shaughnessey
Kōshirō Izumi / Koushiro "Izzy" Izumi	Mutsumi Tamura	Mona Marshall
Mimi Tachikawa	Hitomi Yoshida	Kate Higgins
Joe Kido	Junya Ikeda	Robbie Daymond
Takeru Takaishi / Takeru "T.K." Takaishi	Junya Enoki	Johnny Yong Bosch
Hikari Yagami / Kari Kamiya	Mao Ichimichi	Tara Sands
Agumon	Chika Sakamoto	Tom Fahn
Gabumon	Mayumi Yamaguchi	Kirk Thornton
Piyomon / Biyomon	Atori Shigematsu	Cherami Leigh
Tentomon	Takahiro Sakurai	Jeff Nimoy
Palmon	Kinoko Yamada	Anna Garduno
Gomamon	Junko Takeuchi	Robert Martin Klein
Patamon	Miwa Matsumoto	Laura Summer; Jamieson Price (Angemon)
Tailmon / Gatomon	Yuka Tokumitsu	Kate Higgins
Daisuke Motomiya / Davis Motomiya	Fukujūrō Katayama	Griffin Burns
Miyako Inoue / Yolei Inoue	Ayaka Asai	Jeannie Tirado
Iori Hida / Cody Hida	Yoshitaka Yamaya	Bryce Papenbrook
Ken Ichijouji	Arthur Lounsbery	Derek Stephen Prince
Veemon	Junko Noda	Derek Stephen Prince
Hawkmon	Kōichi Tōchika	Christopher Swindle
Armadilmon / Armadillomon	Megumi Urawa	Robbie Daymond
Wormmon	Naozumi Takahashi	Paul St. Peter
Menoa Bellucci	Mayu Matsuoka	Erika Harlacher
Kyotaro Imura / Kyotaro Yamada	Daisuke Ono	Kaiji Tang
Morphomon	Yuna Taniguchi	Cherami Leigh
Gennai	Hiroaki Hirata	Jeff Nimoy
Parrotmon	Yoshihito Sasaki	Aaron LaPlante
Ayaka	Miho Arakawa	Tara Sands
Ayaka's Girlfriend	Yukiko Morishita	Erica Lindbeck

== Development ==
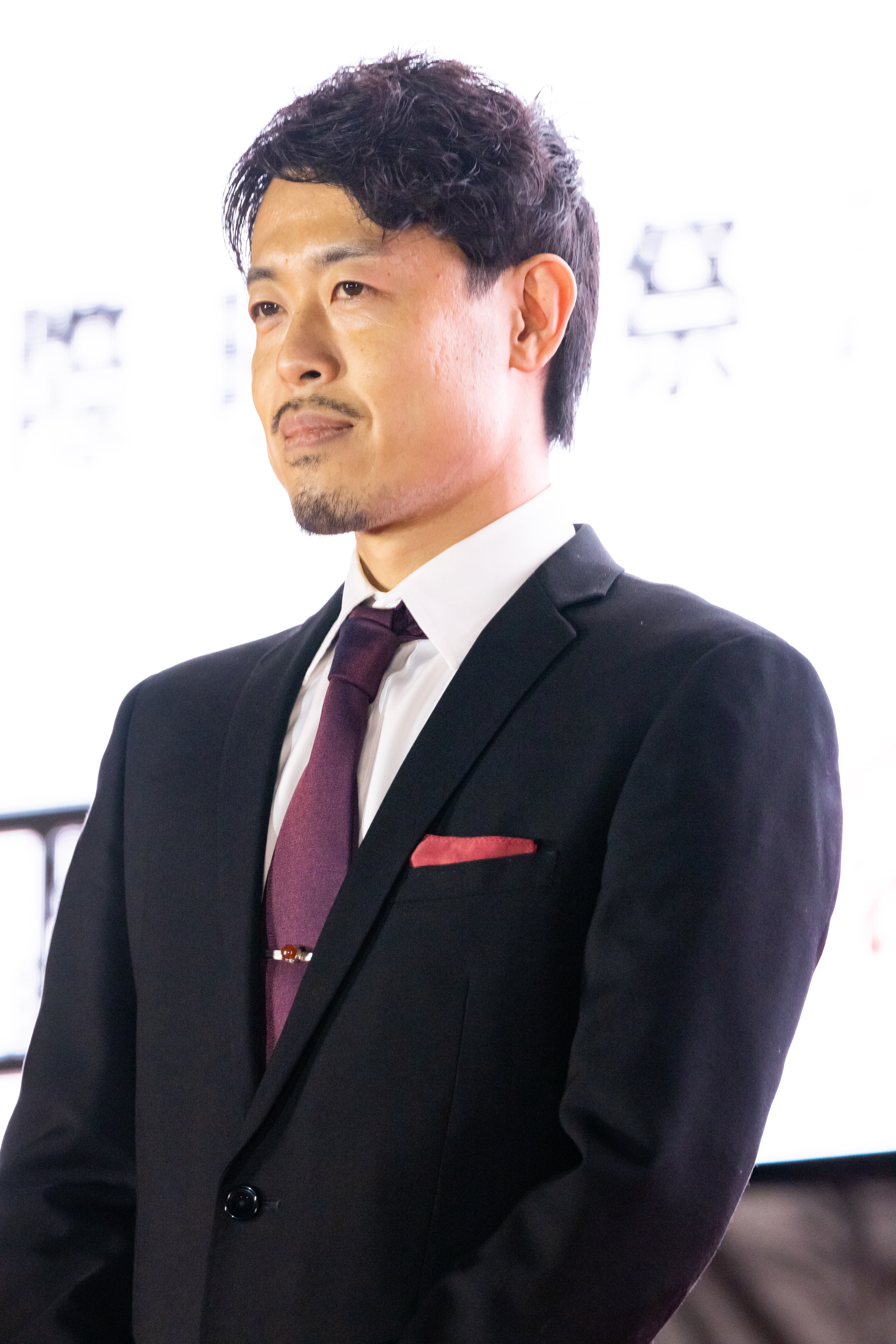
Director Tomohisa Taguchi.

A new film project was announced on July 29, 2018, as part of the series' 20th anniversary. The film, titled Digimon Adventure: Last Evolution Kizuna, is directed by Tomohisa Taguchi and written by Akatsuki Yamatoya, featuring animation by Yumeta Company. It was then teased on Toei's YouTube film account that Toei Animation is producing the film, and the rest of the staff and cast are returning to reprise their roles. It premiered on February 21, 2020.

Development for Last Evolution Kizuna started in 2017, whilst Digimon Adventure tri. was in the middle of airing. It was made as the staff realized the Digimon Adventure series was the most popular part of the Digimon franchise as a whole after the positive reception to Adventure tri., so they decided to make another Adventure movie for its 20th anniversary. Toei aimed the main cast to become far more likable as characters. While the teenagers were known as heroes in television series, they had yet to mature in the narrative to be appeal more to the audience.

On May 28, 2018, original Director of Digimon Adventure and Digimon Adventure 02, Hiroyuki Kakudo revealed he had quit the staff of Digimon Adventure: Last Evolution Kizuna after something was approved that he claimed was incompatible with what the previous series had established. On September 20, 2020, Producer Yosuke Kinoshita stated that Digimon Adventure: Last Evolution Kizuna is in continuity with Digimon Adventure, Digimon Adventure 02, Digimon Adventure 02: Digimon Hurricane Landing!!/Transcendent Evolution!! The Golden Digimentals, and Digimon Adventure tri.. This included the end of the final episode of 02, set in 2028, where the DigiDestined are adults.

Before the film's release in the U.S., Comic Book Resources held an interview with Executive Producer Yosuke Kinoshita regarding the franchise itself and what he wanted the fans to take away from the film. During the interview, Yosuke stated, "As we go through life, I believe that it is not only success and joy that makes you grow as a person but also overcoming failure. Hard and sad realities are what keeps us alive. I'm sure there will be a lot of obstacles in the future, but let's go live our lives forward strongly! This is the message that we are trying to convey."

=== North America ===
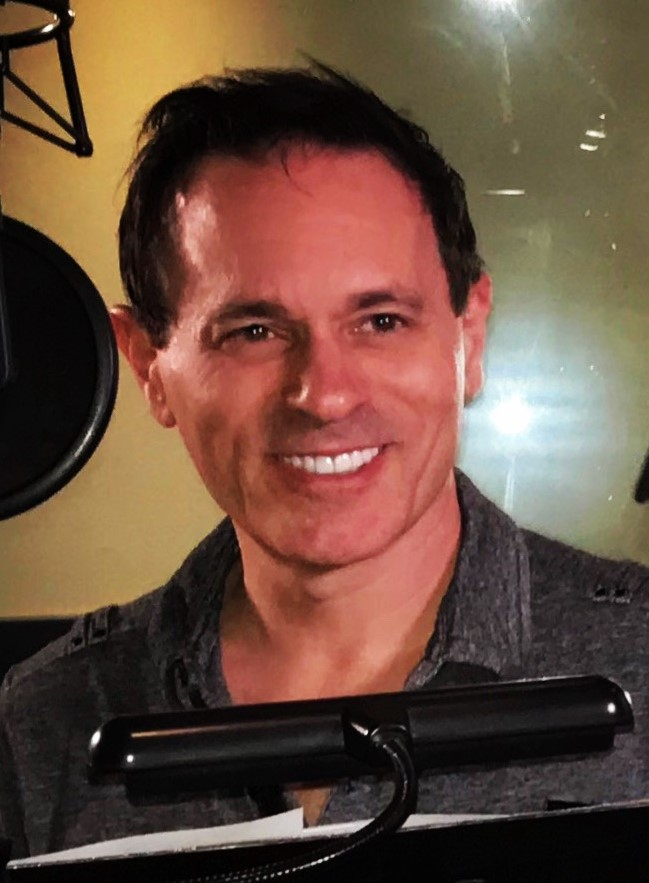
Joshua Seth, who voiced the main character Taichi Yagami / Taichi "Tai" Kamiya.

The North American release of Last Evolution Kizuna had continued the strategic positioning established by Digimon Adventure tri. (2016) in the U.S., handled by Toei Animation and Shout! Factory, which features slight differences from the Japanese direction: among other aspects, the project once again featured some of the veteran voice actors from the 1999 TV series, to allow a generation of viewers to reconnect with the series. The aim was to relaunch this dynamic on a target that was more intergenerational and family-oriented than in Japan. The success of the Digimon TV series on platforms like Hulu played a crucial role, for Joshua Seth (Tai), "without [the support of the fans], the producers would never have invested time money or resources to creating new Digimon". Last Evolution Kizuna was well received commercially in the United States, performing well in both digital and Blu-Ray sales, and became the best-selling anime title upon its release, demonstrating clear fan loyalty and a degree of benevolence among customers in relations that has bolstered the confidence of decision-makers for new long-term projects in this specific market. This tour de force was then emulated by various countries for Kizuna in 2021, after several years of hesitancy due to the franchise's drop in notoriety in Japan. — Toei has presented projects such as Digimon Tri to professionals from many countries for several years in a row, without finding any real business. Toei Animation has brought back some of these prolific voice actors, well known for their work at Disney, in cartoons and iconic works for the Digimon generation.

During the production of the English dub, Brian Donovan was supposed to reprise Davis Motomiya. Unfortunately, he was unable to because of a fault in his home studio, and the role was recast with Griffin Burns. Neil Kaplan was similarly unavailable to reprise his roles as Hawkmon and Aquilamon due to bad timing and tight deadlines; he was replaced by Christopher Swindle. The rest of the English dub production began around February 2020 and finished up at the end of spring. The majority of the cast recorded their sessions from home studios due to the ongoing pandemic. Donovan and Kaplan, who were absent from this feature due to the pandemic, returned in the sequel, The Beginning. The sequel was announced at New York Comic Con for a near-simultaneous theatrical release in the U.S., with its Japanese premiere.

== Releases ==
In Japan, the film was released on February 21, 2020 in 48 theaters, then in 61 theaters from its fourth week in March, due to a number of postponements caused by the COVID-19 pandemic. Set in the same continuity of the first two Digimon television anime series, the film serves as the finale to the original Digimon Adventure story.

Due to the COVID-19 pandemic over Tokyo and the whole of Japan, a state of health emergency was gradually applied in various regions; to the whole of Japan from April 7 to 16, 2020, and was extended in several regions. From May 14 to May 25, 2020, while the state of emergency was relaxed in some regions, it was progressively re-imposed throughout Japan until the end of July. Causing gradual shutdowns, cancellations and postponed screenings of the film over the weeks due to the closures (and reopenings) of Japanese cinemas, the film has its final showing on July 23, 2020, "It's frustrating, but we never thought the film would be shown for so long and that people would respond in this unimaginable situation, with lots of feedback from you. We hope the day will soon come when we can see the film in cinemas in better conditions and in the way we want", communicated the film's social network. Two sets of the Digimon Card Premium Edition card game were produced for the film's release and sold in selected cinemas showing the film on February 21, 2020, followed by limited pre-orders on Bandai's Premium website.

The Japanese release of the DVD and Blu-ray was released on September 2, 2020, along with an audio drama to come with it on CD. A Deluxe Blu-ray edition was also released in Japan. The film was selected for the Tenjin Cinema Selection 2021 Summer, August 7–8, 2021.

=== English market ===
The film was also scheduled to be released in its original Japanese format with English subtitles through Fathom Events in the United States on March 25, 2020, but was cancelled because of movie theater closures due to the COVID-19 pandemic. The film was set to be released direct-to-video in the United States on July 7, 2020 but production was delayed indefinitely on May 9, 2020. On July 20, 2020, it was announced it will be released digitally on September 29, 2020, on Prime Video, iTunes, Microsoft Store and PlayStation Network, and on DVD/Blu-ray on October 6, 2020.

In Australia and New Zealand, Madman Entertainment confirmed on August 31, after a first announcement for March 7 and a postponement, a limited theatrical release on September 17, 2020, making the film's world premiere in English; a preview in its original Japanese format with English subtitles was held on March 8, 2020, at the Madman Anime Festival, Sydney. A physical edition by the same Australian distributor also followed, on January 13, 2021.

In the United Kingdom, the film was announced on August 23, 2021, as part of the Scotland Loves Anime festival, for a screening (in subtitled version) on October 15, 2021, in Edinburgh with All The Anime; on February 24, 2022, Anime Limited announced a one-off screening of the film (in subtitled version) in partnership with Showcase Cinemas across the UK, on March 9, 2022, at 7 p.m., in selected cinemas in Bristol, Cardiff, Coventry, Derby, Dudley, Leeds, Leicester, Liverpool, Nottingham, Peterborough and Reading. In October 2021, a physical edition was reported to be in preparation by Anime Limited, and after several years of reluctance due to the flops of the two UK events consecutively in its original Japanese format with English subtitles, Last Evolution Kizuna was officially released on November 27, 2023, on DVD/Blu-ray; Digimon's resurgent business in the US has piqued the UK publisher's interest and according to Anime Limited's CEO, the success of their physical release of the film (which included the dubbed version) has helped to gauge commercial demand and to relaunch Digimon across the UK for new projects.

== Reception ==
Last Evolution Kizuna, while unnoticed by cinema reviewers, received very positive reviews from pop culture and anime media when it was released in the US. European film critics, though, were more severe.

Kambole Cambell from IGN gave the film a 9/10, stating, "An impressively bold and mature final installment, Digimon Adventure: Last Evolution Kizuna realizes the full potential of its cast and the power of a definitive ending, driven by an inventive visual sensibility, exciting set-pieces, and heart-wrenching emotional stakes [...] It's ultimately bittersweet, but the film's embrace of change is tackled with inspiring optimism, positing that moving forward shouldn't be treated as a loss, but as a new direction, definitively closing this chapter of Digimon Adventure while looking forward to what new things might spring from it." Common Sense Media gave the film a 4/5, stating, "This is a bittersweet coming-of-age story that manages to transcend the expected anime battles and action. For those coming into the movie without knowing all of the ins and outs of this particular anime universe, the movie's heady themes of life and death, growing up and moving on, and making your own way in the world are poignant, universal, and relatable."

Polygon's Rafael Motamayor gave the film a positive review and felt that the editing, which used the conventions of the TV series, might put off newcomers, but that the film was aimed at "millennials who grew up with the franchise and want a little more than constant battle scenes", commenting on the tone being "much more melancholic than most modern anime movies and stating, "It's a love letter not only to the entire franchise, but to those who have grown up watching these characters throughout the years. This is the conclusion fans have been waiting for [...] providing a nice returning point for fans who may have skipped the underwhelming Tri series of films." Comic Book Resources also gave the film a positive review, stating, "Last Evolution isn't a cinematic masterpiece (no surprise there) but what it is a masterclass on how to age a long-running, commercial property with grace and bring it to a conclusion with dignity. The original DigiDestined's journey, as we once knew it, is over, but this isn't a story about putting away childish things."

Critics praised the film for its themes of adulthood and, "letting things go." Daryl Harding of Crunchyroll states that, "it is about growing up and letting go. For the characters, it's hard to be a DigiDestined and still have a job – apparently saving the world doesn't pay well. It's not about them choosing what to focus on, it's about them learning how to juggle both responsibilities without cracking." The film drew comparisons to Mamoru Hosoda's previous works on Digimon, as well as drawing comparisons to Toy Story 3. The production as a whole was well received, though the reduced representation of female characters was pointed out and deplored by Courtney Lanning for the daily Arkansas Democrat-Gazette and Den of Geek.

In his review, Christopher Farris of Anime News Network gave the film a C−, acknowledging its minimalist graphic charm and some interesting ideas, but criticizing the insincerity of this production "at odds with itself", citing unnecessary metatexts and several nonsensical plot points dragged out with "conceptual declarations hindering the pacing", Farris also noted frustratingly uneven character development, stressing the sidelining of protagonist Sora. Regarding the English dubbing, he felt it was a "key selling point" for the film due to the effectiveness of the adaptation; this was also the opinion of Courtney Lanning for the Arkansas Democrat-Gazette and Christopher Zabel of DoBlu.com, "a slightly different directions than the Japanese cast" which was well welcomed.

In stark contrast, however, European reviewers were more critical of the film. For the European daily El Correo, it is an opus "that does not dare to describe with the necessary thoroughness the theme it tries to develop", and deplored the lack of risk-taking in its direction and codes, "Last Evolution Kizuna replays a tape already played" and gave the film a 1/3. For Deciné21, it is a film that falls into the pitfalls of Japanese anime films "with repetitive passages and endless dialogue. Above all, it is aimed at fans, so newcomers will find it difficult to assimilate all the concepts of the series too quickly", while nevertheless praising "certain passages that are quite moving. In addition, the animation is of a high enough quality to be a surprise" and gave the film a 5/10. The Italian film website MyMovies.it found the codes of the original television product too much in evidence, "a typical example of animated films in cinema today, aimed at an ultra-specific audience that will master everything about their subject and, ideally, grasp every twist and self-reference", but praised the "more melancholic atmosphere than usual and a more mature awareness of the transience of things" and gave the film a 2.5/5. The daily El Punt gave 2/5 to the film. For Ray Laguna of Animacionparaadultos.es, whose verdict was based on "strictly cinematographic" criteria, attributed 7/10 to a film "not always very exciting [...] the plot development is a little conventional, it falls into a few melodramatic excesses - the denouement is already moving enough - and, probably for budgetary reasons, there are passages with limited animation", Laguna nevertheless considered Last Evolution Kizuna touching enough for its audience of die-hard fans.

Regarding audience reception, Digimon Adventure: Last Evolution Kizuna received recognition in various platforms and surveys. In Japan, readers of Anime!Anime! magazine ranked it as the 14th best animated film of 2020. Additionally, in a survey on Bandai's Digimon website, it was in 3rd place out of 18 Digimon films, garnering 16% of the votes. At the Tokyo Anime Award Festival 2021, the film attained the 8th position among the 'Best 100' votes for 'Best Anime Film'. Furthermore, it stood out in the "Letterboxd 2020 Year in Review", securing the 5th position among the highest-rated animations of 2020 by members. Similarly, it ranked 5th among the 'Best Anime Movies Of 2020' on MyAnimeList, with an average rating of 8.18.

=== Sales ===
In Japan, Digimon Adventure: Last Evolution Kizuna has sold 1,495 units on Blu-Ray for the standard edition and 1,610 units on DVD, ranking 4th and 1st respectively in the anime sales chart in its first week. The collector's edition, "Deluxe", sells 10,039 units and ranks 2nd in the anime Blu-ray sales chart when released between August 31 and September 6, 2020.

In the United States, the theatrical release was cancelled due to cinema closures caused by the COVID-19 pandemic. The Blu-Ray edition from Shout! Factory has sold 31,040 units in six days, generating $453,494 in revenue. The Blu-ray ranked 3rd overall in U.S. Blu-Ray sales for its first week on the market, October 11, 2020, Last Evolution Kizuna had a "spectacular 95% market share" among high-definition releases and sold 76% as many units as Disney's Hocus Pocus. Total estimated sales (as of December 2020) are $705,734 ($19,153 DVD, $686,581 Blu-ray).

=== Box-office ===
In Japan, the film grossed 120 million yen ($1,105,168) in its first weekend of release, taking sixth place at the general box-office. The average gross per cinema was 2.5 million yen ($23,024.3). It achieved the biggest opening weekend for a modern Digimon film — the Tri series of films were released as OVAs with distribution limited to ten copies and simultaneously available on VOD — with 78,437 tickets sold in its first four days of release, on 48 copies, then 71 copies from its fourth week of release in March, due to a number of postponements caused by the COVID-19 pandemic. Digimon Adventure: Last Evolution Kizuna was the 17th highest-grossing animated film in Japan in 2020, bringing in 300 million yen ($2,905,338) from its total domestic run. The film has benefited from a less competitive landscape in its sector and a market facing less severe challenges than other countries affected by the pandemic crisis.

In Mainland China, the film surpassed the one billion yen mark at the box office in four days, surpassing the sum earned in Japan and accounting for more than 70% of the film's box-office receipts as of October 30, 2020, and in five days (with $11.42 million) became the most profitable Japanese film in China in 2020 for 2.45 million tickets sold. With 124.44 million yuan ($18.97 million US) in revenue after four weeks at the top of the Chinese box-office, Digimon Adventure: Last Evolution Kizuna was the most lucrative non-American foreign film at the Chinese general box-office in 2020, ranking 27th for a total of 125.2 million yuan ($19.4 million) with 3 748 608 tickets sold, exceptionally supplanting the annual success of the Doraemon feature films. An important performance due to the reopening of cinemas in summer 2020, after the closures caused by the COVID-19 pandemic throughout Asia at the beginning of the year.

In Hong Kong, the film topped the box office on its first day of release on May 16, 2020; it was 1st in the Hong Kong box office for four consecutive weeks, 3rd in the fifth week of release and 9th in the sixth week; for a total of HK$13.7 million (US$1,767,382) in gross receipts with 192 523 tickets sold, making it the 10th overall Hong Kong box office film of 2020. For the first time since 2016, a Japanese film is in the country's annual top 10.

In Taiwan, the film climbed to number 1 at the box office in its first weekend of release and for four consecutive weeks, taking 3rd place in its sixth week and remaining in the top 10 at the Taiwanese box office in its seventh and eighth weeks, grossing TWD 9.31 million (US$315,935). In South Korea, the film ranked 12th at the national box office in its first week of release, earning 49,397,000 won ($44,737.1) for 4,739 cumulative admissions in three weeks of release. In Malaysia, the film topped the box-office for two consecutive weeks and in its fourth week of release.

In Thailand, the film ranked first on its first day of release for 6.2 hundred thousand baht ($19,597.8) and grossed 2.84 million baht ($89,770.7) in its opening weekend, the second-best start since cinemas reopened in the wake of the pandemic; for a total of 3.81 million baht ($120,432) in eight days, becoming the highest-grossing Asian film of 2020 in this territory; for a total of 5.15 million baht ($162,788), ranking 4th among the country's highest-grossing animated films of the year.

In Australia, the film grossed a total of $23,372 over its six-week run, including $10,715 in its opening week on 27 copies. In New Zealand, the film grossed $4,677 over four weeks of its very limited release, with $3,327 in the first week of opening. In the United Kingdom, the film garnered 261 admissions, generating an estimated revenue of £2,000.26 (approximately $2,597.21) during its single screening on March 9, 2022, at 7:00 pm, in a selection of cinemas.

In Mexico, the film ranked 4th at the general box office in its first week of release, from February 21 to 27, 2022, earning 4.9 million Mexican pesos ($240,020) from 57,900 cinema-goers, and ran until March 23, 2022.

In Spain, the film ranked 13th at the Spanish box office during its 1st weekend on 108 copies with 4,815 admissions and €30,669 takings ($36,077), from March 31 to April 4, 2021; 10,163 admissions and €61,999 ($72,881) including its preview. Extended by the distributor across 92 copies, it ranked 18th during its second weekend with 2,224 spectators and €13,896 in takings, i.e. €92,281 ($110,431) out of a total of 15,239 tickets sold.

In Germany, the film reached 12th place at the German box office from October 18 to 24, 2021, with 7,894 admissions and box office takings of €92,353 ($107,110) for 173 copies; in its second week, from October 25 to 31, the film grossed €3,277 ($3,800.63) with 269 tickets sold in ten cinemas, for a total of €108,369 ($125,685) with 9,213 tickets sold.

In Italy, the film ranked 16th at the general box office with 3,309 tickets sold and €24,964.25 ($28,251.5) in takings after four days on 203 copies. It earned an estimated total box office of €31,369 ($35,346.6) for 4,826 admissions during its twelve-day run from December 9 to 15, 2021.

In France, the film was distributed as an event film on 162 cinemas (18 in the Paris Region, the most populous of the eighteen regions of France), from September 24 to 27, 2020, in the midst of the COVID-19 pandemic crisis at a time between two lockdowns, with an admissions deficit of minus 70%. Digimon Adventure: Last Evolution Kizuna sold 3,684 tickets for an estimated €24,424.92 in receipts ($28,761.60), a positive result for the distributor after four days of release.

In Portugal, the film ranked 11th at the general box office, taking in €12,050 ($12,110) for 2,225 tickets sold in its opening week on 60 copies in September 2021. In its second weekend in 44 cinemas, the film ranked 9th and earned €22,537 ($22,564.5) for 4,171 tickets sold; it ran for a further two weeks, taking in a total of €24,623.73 ($26,285.6) for 4,584 admissions.

In Austria, the film opened in 24th place with €4,800 ($5,566.99) in takings, €8,800 ($10,206.2) including previews, with a total of 957 admissions in its week of release. In Luxembourg, the film was released as a three-day event distribution in September 2020, in two Kinepolis cinemas, and sold 69 tickets, for a gross estimated at €586.5 ($686.51). In Egypt, it earned a total of 4,505 Egyptian pounds ($285.34).

=== Accolades ===
List of awards and nominations
Year	Award	Category	Recipient(s)	Result
2021	27th Manga Barcelona Awards	Best anime movie release in theaters	Digimon Adventure: Last Evolution Kizuna	Nominated
2021	27th Manga Barcelona Awards	Best anime movie premiere on platforms/TV	Digimon Adventure: Last Evolution Kizuna	Nominated
2021	27th Manga Barcelona Awards	Best anime film in physical format (BR/DVD)	Digimon Adventure: Last Evolution Kizuna	Won
2022	6th Crunchyroll Anime Awards	Best VA Performance (German)	Florian Knorn as Tai Yagami	Nominated
2022	6th Crunchyroll Anime Awards	Best VA Performance (Castilian)	Bianca Rada as Tai Yagami	Nominated

== Digimon Adventure 20th Memorial Story ==
Digimon Adventure 20th Memorial Story (Japanese: デジモンアドベンチャー20th メモリアルストーリー, Hepburn: Dejimon Adobenchā 20th Memoriaru Sutōrī) is a series of Japanese anime shorts related to Digimon Adventure: Last Evolution Kizuna, the first of which, To Sora, being a prequel set a day before the film. The rest feature side stories about the DigiDestined and their Partner Digimon going about their everyday lives that were unable to make it into the film itself.

=== Episodes ===
No. (Note: On August 20, 2019 Toei Animation announced that they planned to create five anime shorts to help celebrate the 20th anniversary of Digimon Adventure, and decided to fund them through Crowdfunding, opening a page on the crowdfunding website, Campfire. Starting on August 22, Japanese fans would have until October 2 to raise ¥10,000,000 for the shorts to funded, though stated that even if the funding project failed, the shorts would still be made using an alternate method.The crowdfunding was a success, finishing at 383% funded with a total of ¥38,336,588 raised.)	Title	Original release date
1	"To Sora"; Transliteration: "Sora e" (Japanese: 空へ)	November 22, 2019 (Note: The first episode, To Sora played between November 22, 2019 and January 9, 2020 as part of a Digimon Limited Base Pop-Up Theatre in Shibuya Parco. On January 31, 2020 Toei uploaded To Sora with both English and Japanese subtitles to their official YouTube page.)
2	"Hole in the Heart"; Transliteration: "Kokoro no ana" (Japanese: 心の穴)	February 21, 2020 (Note: The second episode, Hole in the Heart, aired as part of another Pop-Up Theatre between February 21, 2020 and April 16, 2020.)
3	"Medical Student Joe Kido"; Transliteration: "Igaku-sei Kido Jō" (Japanese: 医学生・城戸丈)	July 10, 2020 (Note: The third episode, Medical Student Joe Kido, aired as part of another Pop-Up Theatre between July 10, 2020 and September 2, 2020.)
4	"The Desired Jogress Evolution"; Transliteration: "Akogare no Jogress Shinka" (Japanese: あこがれのジョグレス進化)	October 16, 2020 (Note: The fourth episode, The Desired Jogress Evolution, aired as part of another Pop-Up Theatre between October 16, 2020 and November 11, 2020.)
5	"The Shibuya-ish Heroic Saga of Pump and Gotsu"; Transliteration: "Panpu to Gotsu no Shibuya-kei buyū-den" (Japanese: パンプとゴツの渋谷系武勇伝)	December 25, 2020 (Note: All five episodes, including the final episode, The Shibuya-ish Heroic Saga of Pump and Gotsu, shipped on Blu-ray Disc to backers on December 25, 2020.)

== Sequel ==
Between August 2021 and July 2022, a sequel titled Digimon Adventure 02: The Beginning was announced. The film serves as the series finale of the Digimon Adventure 02 story. The film premiered on October 27, 2023.
