= Megumi Urawa =

Japanese voice actress

- 浦和 めぐみ
- Born: Chiba, Japan
- Occupation: Voice actress
- Years active: 1987–present
- Agent: Aoni Production
- Spouse: Takeji Yoshihara

Megumi Urawa (浦和 めぐみ, Urawa Megumi) is a Japanese voice actress who works for Aoni Production.

== Filmography ==
=== Television animation ===
- Chibi Maruko-chan (1990), Tomiko Tomita, Midori Yoshikawa, Hiromi Maeda, Maki Makimura, Yamada's mother, Yoshiko's Mother, Taguchi, Tarō, Himeko, Yoshida
- Magical Taruruto-kun (1990), Korekiyo Ryouguchiya
- Goldfish Warning! (1991), Piko, Bunta
- 21 Emon (1992), Girl
- Super Bikkuriman (1992), Asuka/Izana Asuka
- The Laughing Salesman (1992), Naoko
- Aoki Densetsu Shoot! (1993), Kiyotaka Hirose, Shinobu
- Dragon Ball Z (1993), Erasa, Oob
- Heisei Inu Monogatari Bow (1993), Madoka
- Marmalade Boy (1994), Ryouko Momoi
- Mobile Suit Gundam Wing (1995), Iria Winner
- Dr. Slump (1997), Peasuke Soramame
- Yu-Gi-Oh! (1998), Imori
- One Piece (1999), Roronoa Zoro (child), Koala's Mother
- Digimon Adventure 02 (2000), Iori Hida, Armadimon, Noriko Kawada
- Atashin'chi (2002), Arisa Kohei, Bread Owner
- Zatch Bell! (2003), Hyde
- Planetes, (2003), Mother
- Black Jack, (2005) Candy
- HeartCatch PreCure! (2010), Hayato
- Sakiika-kun (2011), Kusaya
- Digimon Xros Wars (2011), Dracomon
- World Trigger (2014), Yōtarō Rindō
- Dragon Ball Kai (2015), Oob
- Dragon Ball Super (2017), Oguma
- Soaring Sky! Pretty Cure (2023), Pinkton

Unknown date

- Ghost Sweeper Mikami, Heaven Dragon Baby, Engeji
- Hatara Kizzu Maihamu Gumi, Saburo
- Hell Teacher Nūbē, Makoto Kurita
- Cheeky Angel, Angel Wing
- Dragon Ball GT, Sealer
- Muka Muka Paradise, Nika Nika
- Slayers NEXT, Auntie Aqua (Episode 18 only)

=== Film animation ===
- Dr. Slump and Arale-chan: N-cha!! Excited Heart of Summer Vacation (1994), Mummy
- Go! Go! Ackman (1994), Ackman
- Crayon Shin-chan: Unkokusai's Ambition (1995), Fubukimaru Kasuga
- Jigoku Sensei Nūbē (1996), Makoto Kurita
- Ultimate Muscle (2002), Arenanda
- One Piece: The Cursed Holy Sword (2004), Roronoa Zoro (young)
- Digimon Adventure: Last Evolution Kizuna (2020), Armadimon

=== Video games ===
- Graduation series (xxxx), Cindy Sakurai
- Red Earth (1996), Tao, Taru's Mobstar
- Jigoku Sensei Nūbē (1997), Makoto Kurita
- Gotcha Force (2003), Tsutomu, Tama
- Xenosaga Episode II: Jenseits von Gut und Böse (2004), Albedo Piazzola (child)

=== Television advertisement ===
- Chidejika (2009–11)

=== Dubbing ===
- Pinocchio - Lampwick
