= Quiz RPG: The World of Mystic Wiz =

2013 video game

- Developer(s): Colopl, Core Edge (PC version)
- Publisher(s): Colopl, Yahoo! Mobage (PC version)
- Platform(s): iOS; Android; Windows
- Release: JP: March 5, 2013, NA, KR: August 20, 2013, TW: March 20, 2014
- Genre(s): Quiz game; RPG; Social game

Quiz RPG: The World of Mystic Wiz (クイズRPG 魔法使いと黒猫のウィズ) is a quiz game, role-playing video game, and social game hybrid that was developed and published by Colopl and released on Android on March 5, 2013 and on iOS on April 22, 2013.

On August 20, 2013, the English and Korean versions of the game saw a worldwide release for iOS and Android. On March 20, 2014, the Simplified Chinese version released, and on January 14, 2015, the Traditional Chinese version released on Google Play in Taiwan, Hong Kong, and Macao.

In September 2016, Yahoo! Mobage launched a PC version that was ported by Core Edge. The PC version is independent of the mobile version, introducing its own spirit, event, MAP and a clan system not in the portable version.

The international version of the game had service terminated on January 18, 2017.

== Gameplay ==
Players take control of an apprentice wizard following a young woman named Wiz and must learn magic by undergoing quests in which they answer trivia questions. Players collect, evolve, and combine elemental spirits in order to form a team and fight monsters. Players can also recruit friends, battle in tournaments, and engage in regular special events for the chance to unlock rare spirits.

The game has 3 different types of elements, forming a weakness triangle. Quiz questions correspond to a certain element, therefore, answering questions of that element will cause the player's spirits to attack enemies with it.

== Reception ==
On May 31, 2014, the game exceeded 26 million downloads in Japan, an increase from 17 million downloads at the start of 2014.

The game received a mixed reception from critics. Max Eddy of PC Magazine rated the game 2.5/5 stars, calling it a "shallow, cynical experience" that forces players to "grind, grind grind", and said that he would rather be playing another game. However, Mike Fahey of Kotaku called the game "so simple, it's brilliant" and said that he was "a little in love" with the game.
