= Gero (singer) =

Japanese singer and radio personality (born 1986)

- Also known as: Gero-rin (げろりん)
- Born: January 23, 1986 (age 40)
- Origin: Hyōgo Prefecture, Japan
- Genres: Pop rock, anime
- Occupations: Singer, radio personality
- Years active: 2008–present
- Label: Geneon Universal Entertainment (2013–)
- Website: Official website

Gero (げろ, Gero; born January 23, 1986) is a Japanese singer and radio personality.

He made some of his recordings public on Niconico, a Japanese video sharing website in 2008 and since then, his videos have been watched over 40 million times in total. He released his debut single "Beloved×Survival", the theme song of a TV anime Brothers Conflict in 2013. He also forms a duo called Dagero (蛇下呂, Dagero) with the singer Dasoku (蛇足, Dasoku).

== Career ==
He came to like heavy metal music when he was in junior high and has been influenced by the singing style of Anchang, the vocalist of SEX MACHINEGUNS.

He started posting his singing videos on Niconico from 2008. His name "Gero" comes from his experience of being nauseated while he was recording his first singing video ("Gero" means "vomit" in Japanese).

He started performing at live music clubs from 2010. In 2011, he made a national tour where he performed in 18 cities across Japan. Tickets for most of those 18 shows were sold out within a couple of minutes after they went on sale.

In 2012, he sang the opening song of a TV drama Air's Rock and also the theme song of an arcade game, "Pokémon Tretta".

He made his debut under Geneon Universal Entertainment in July 2013 with the single "Beloved×Survival", the opening theme of a TV anime Brothers Conflict. In the same month, he started his third national tour and performed in 26 cities.

On January 29, 2014, he released his 2nd single, "~Outgrow~", the theme song of a TV anime Tokyo Ravens. He created lyrics for its flip-side song, "Bokurano (僕らの, Bokurano)".

He released his 3rd single "I am a Male Cat" (lyrics, music and arrange by Kenichi Maeyamada) on May 21, 2014. Its flip-side song, "CHAN－BA－LA Justice Densetsu", is the ending theme of a TV anime, Eagle Talon EX (Extreme).

On July 2, 2014, he released his 2nd major album Second and in the same month, he started his fourth nationwide tour "Gero Live Tour 2014 -SECOND-".

He released his 4th single "MY SWEET HEAVEN♂♀ ", the opening theme of OVA Brothers Conflict on November 26, 2014.

On February 25, 2014, he released his first-ever live DVD "Gero Live Tour 2014 -SECOND- DVD".

On July 1, 2015, he released his 3rd major album ZERO and in the same month, he started his fifth nationwide tour "Gero Live Tour 2015 -ZERO-".

== Discography ==
=== Studio albums ===
No.	Title	Release date
1	Gourmet	July 7, 2011
2	Cross	June 6, 2012
3	One	July 24, 2013
4	Second	July 2, 2014
5	Zero	July 1, 2015
7	Road	July 9, 2016
6	Egoist	July 27, 2017
7	Tokyo Haze	August 26, 2020
8	Parade	September 7, 2022

=== Compilation albums ===
No.	Title	Release date
1	Gero the Best: Treasure	August 8, 2018

=== Singles ===
No.	Title	Release date
1	"Beloved×Survival"	Jul.10, 2013
2	"Outgrow"	Jan.29, 2014
3	"I Am a Male Cat"	May 21, 2014
4	"My Sweet Heaven"	November 26, 2014
5	"The Bandits"	May 25, 2015
6	"Dreamer"	October 21, 2015
7	"Hhoowwll"	July 24, 2019

=== DVD ===
No.	Title	Release date
1	Gero Live Tour 2014: Second DVD	February 25, 2015

== Book ==
- Gero（2012, SHUFU-TO-SEIKATSU SHA, ISBN 978-4-391-14209-9）

== Media ==
=== TV ===
- Mezamashi TV (「MIDORI ga MADOGUCHI corner, Dec. 2013 – )
- Anipara Music Place( Feb. 2014 – )

=== Radio ===
- A&G ARTIST ZONE 2h Tuesday(Apr.2013 – Mar.2015 ）
- A&G ARTIST ZONE GeroのTHE CATCH（超!A&G+：Apr.7,2015 – ）
