= Johnny Yong Bosch =

American actor (born 1976)

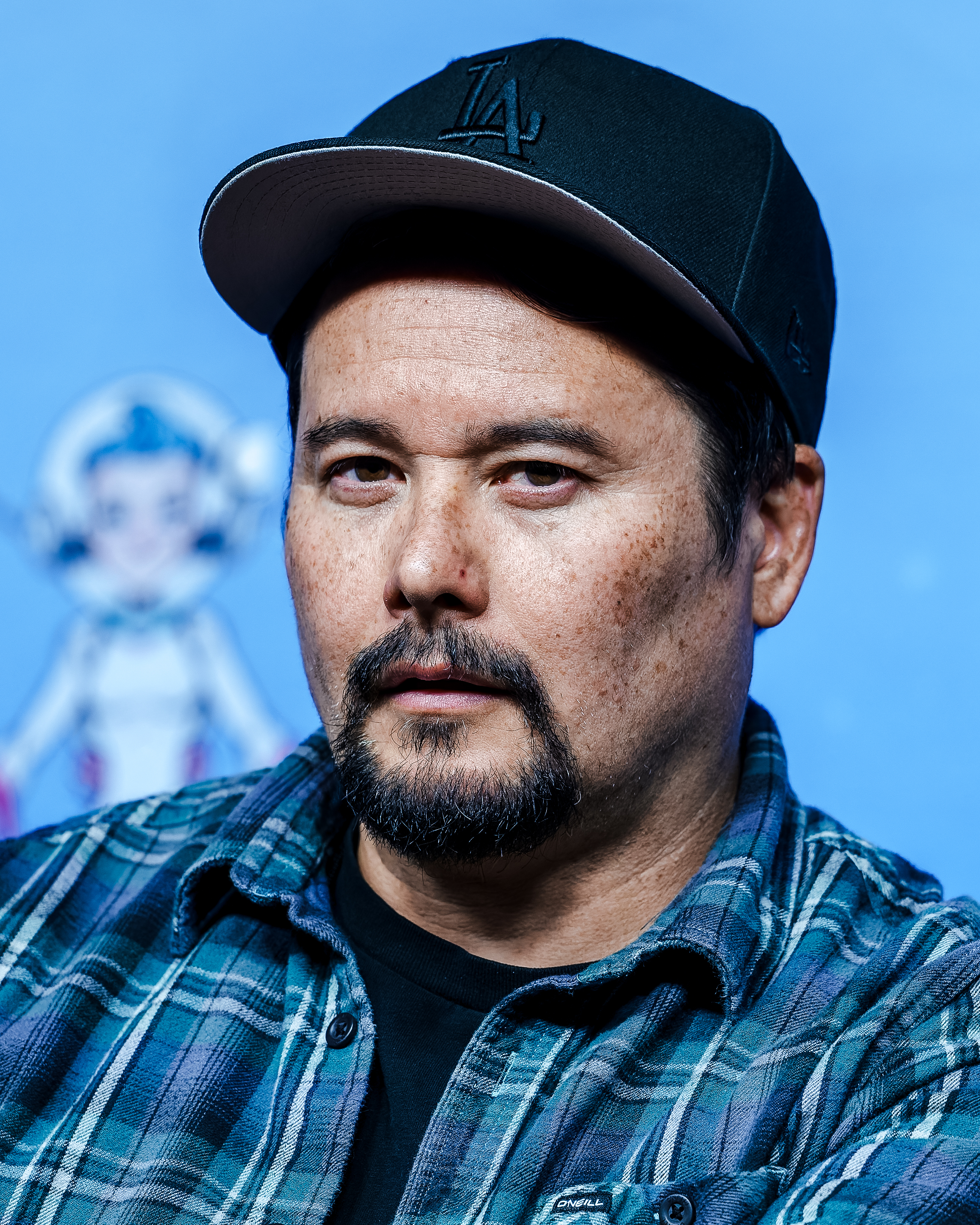
- Bosch in 2026
- Born: John Jay Bosch; January 6, 1976 (age 50); Kansas City, Missouri, U.S.
- Other name: Kevin Hatcher
- Occupations: Actor; musician; singer; martial artist
- Years active: 1994–present
- Spouse: Amy Bosch (m. 2003)
- Children: 2
- Musical career
- Instruments: Vocals; guitar
- Member of: Where Giants Fall
- Formerly of: Eyeshine
- Website: eyeshine.net

Johnny Yong Bosch (born John Jay Bosch; January 6, 1976) is an American actor.

His first major role was the portrayal of Adam Park, the second Black Ranger in the Power Rangers franchise, which led to roles in martial arts television and feature films. As a voice actor, some of his most notable roles are Vash the Stampede in Trigun, Ichigo Kurosaki in Bleach, Yu Narukami and Tohru Adachi in Persona 4, Nero in Devil May Cry, Jonathan Joestar in JoJo's Bizarre Adventure, Lelouch vi Britannia in Code Geass, and Orga Itsuka in Mobile Suit Gundam: Iron-Blooded Orphans.

== Early life ==
Bosch was born John Jay Bosch on January 6, 1976, in Kansas City, Missouri and raised in Garland, Texas. Bosch was born to a Korean mother and an American father of Irish and German descent. He is the second of four children in his family. His father was a soldier in the Army and met his mother while stationed in South Korea. He was interested in martial arts at an early age, inspired by martial arts movies and Bruce Lee. He taught himself martial arts at first, mimicking moves from Lee as well as Jackie Chan. Bosch said he was ridiculed a lot when he was young and became a bully, but made a change for the better after studying Kung Fu. In addition to training in martial arts, in which he won several competitions, he also played soccer.

== Career ==
=== Power Rangers and other projects ===
Bosch auditioned for the Power Rangers show in Dallas after being informed of the audition by his martial arts instructor. In 1994, he landed the role of Adam Park, the new Black Power Ranger, replacing Walter Emanuel Jones in the second season of Mighty Morphin Power Rangers. Bosch said that when he got the part, he changed his middle name to Yong, which was part of his mother's given name, at the request of Saban who thought his credited name needed to be more Asian. For the feature film Power Rangers: The Movie, he did all of his stunts after his stuntman had broken his leg. He also noted that among all the different animal characters the Rangers got to be associated, his was associated to a frog. In Power Rangers Zeo, Bosch's character became a Green Ranger. His final regular stint in the franchise was in Power Rangers Turbo, where his character passes his Green Turbo Ranger powers to a new member. He played Adam in the second feature film Turbo: A Power Rangers Movie. In looking back at his acting for the show, Bosch said that "Power Rangers was a lot of fun but it was a kid's [sic] show and very cheesy because of it, which made getting work after that really hard. Plus, I didn't know squat about acting then." His best friends on the set included Jason David Frank (who played Tommy Oliver), Jason Narvy (who played Skull) and Nakia Burrise (who played Tanya Sloan). Bosch returned as Adam Park in the Power Rangers in Space episode "Always a Chance". At the request of Power Rangers director Koichi Sakamoto, he had an additional guest appearance in the Power Rangers Operation Overdrive episode "Once A Ranger" in 2007 for the franchise's 15th anniversary, where he mentioned he got to go to New Zealand. He and Narvy also starred in the film Wicked Game, also known as Extreme Heist, which was directed by Sakamoto and features several other Power Rangers alumni.

In 2020, Bosch directed his first film, Ark Exitus, starring Jason Narvy.

In 2023, Bosch reprised the role of Adam Park in a 30th-anniversary special, Mighty Morphin Power Rangers: Once & Always, which was released on Netflix in April of that year.

=== Voice acting ===
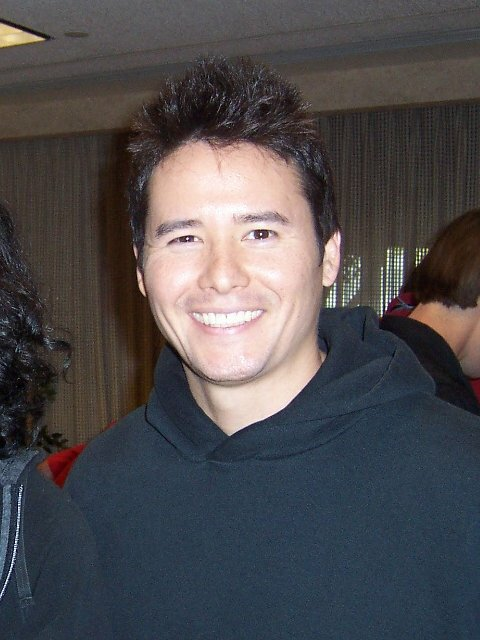
Bosch in 2007

Bosch made his voice acting debut as Shotaro Kaneda in the cult classic anime film Akira. In 2001, he voiced main character Vash the Stampede in the anime Trigun, and later reprised the same role as Vash in the 2010 movie Trigun: Badlands Rumble as well as in the 2023 ongoing anime reboot called Trigun Stampede. He worked once again with Koichi Sakamoto on the film Broken Path. Also in 2001, Bosch was also cast as the lead role of Ichigo Kurosaki in the hit shonen anime Bleach. Among other works, Bosch also voiced Lelouch in Code Geass in 2008, and Izaya Orihara in Durarara!! in 2011. Johnny voiced Yun Arikawa in the 2021 Netflix kaiju anime series, Godzilla Singular Point.

In video games, Bosch has voiced Firion, the protagonist of Final Fantasy II, in the crossover games Dissidia Final Fantasy and Dissidia 012 Final Fantasy. In 2011, he voiced Yang in Super Street Fighter IV Arcade Edition, the protagonist Yu Narukami as well as the antagonist Tohru Adachi in the Persona 4 games and its anime adaptation. He would also return to voice Adachi in the 2027 remake Persona 4 Revival. In 2014, Bosch also voiced main character Hajime Hinata in Danganronpa 2: Goodbye Despair. In 2015, he voiced Kung Jin in Mortal Kombat X. Among video games, Bosch liked voicing Nero in Devil May Cry 4 as he got to travel to Japan to do the motion capture. He reprised his role of voicing Nero in its following Devil May Cry 5. In the same year, Bosch landed the role of Artemis in Viz Media's redub of Sailor Moon as well as Sailor Moon Crystal. Bosch also voiced lead character Nate Adams from Yo-kai Watch which has aired on Disney XD in the US.

On July 4, 2017, he voiced Broccoli Punch in Cartoon Network's Mighty Magiswords, recording with fellow Power Rangers actor Paul Schrier. He reprised his role as Broccoli Punch, as well as playing the Giant Monster and Whiney, in the second season two-part episode "The Incredible Tiny Warriors".

In 2019, Bosch replaced Vic Mignogna as the voice of Broly and Sabo for the Funimation dub of the Dragon Ball and One Piece franchises respectively, due to the sexual harassment allegations against Mignogna.

=== Music ===
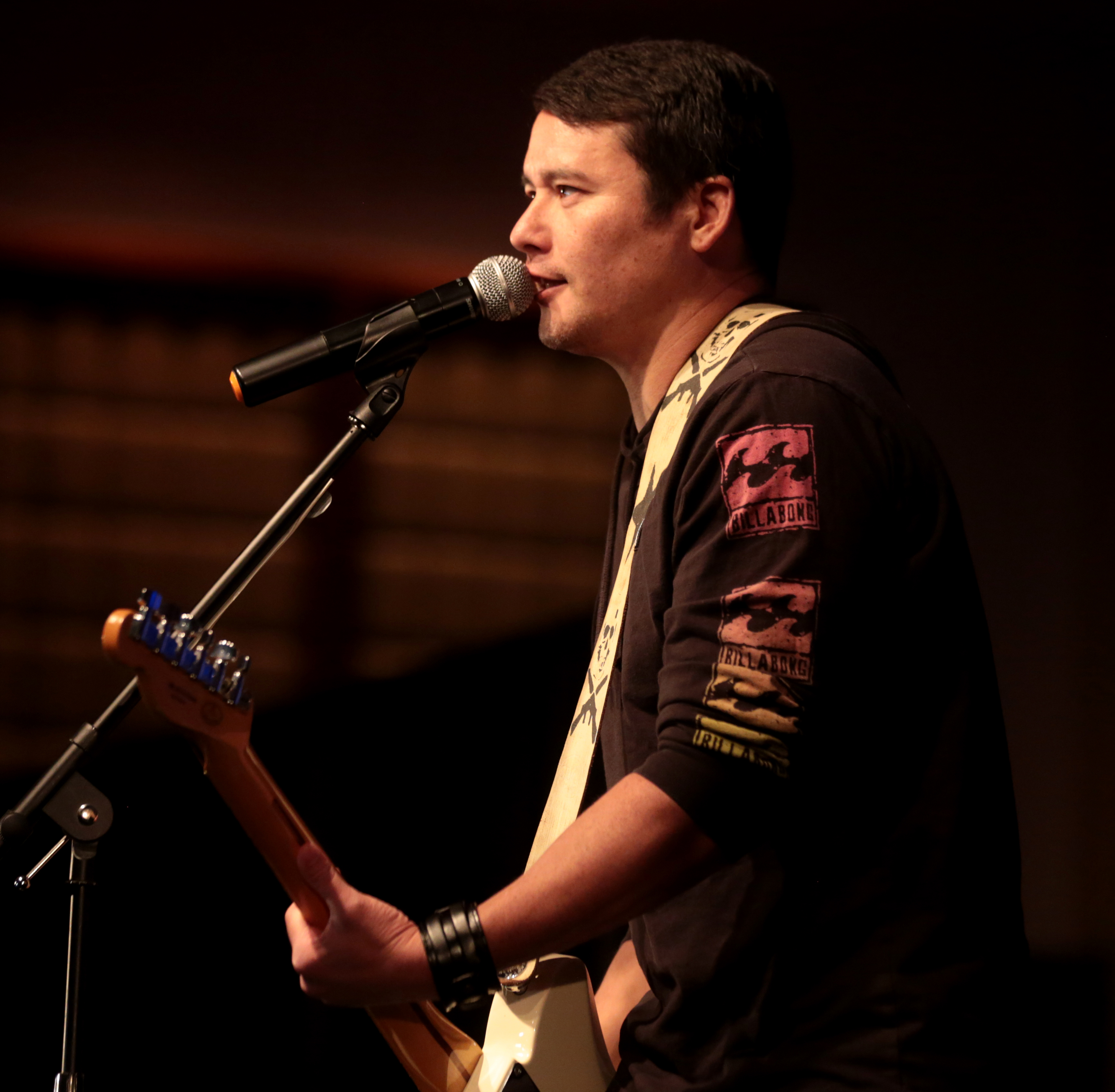
Bosch performing with Eyeshine at the 2017 Saboten Con

Bosch got involved in music by teaching himself how to play guitar. In his band Eyeshine, he provides vocals, songwriting, and guitar. He describes the type of music he plays as "Edge Rock. We're somewhere on the edge of sounding like grunge, alt. rock, punk and pop." His musical inspirations include The Beatles, Foo Fighters, Nirvana, Oasis, Led Zeppelin and also movie soundtracks.

The band released an instrumental album called Sonosis. Bosch described the album as "something you could just listen to and could move you to feel something" and that "the titles were a reflection of the emotions we felt as we wrote the songs".

The band gave their final performance at Yama-Con in December 2017.

In 2018, Johnny formed a new band with former Eyeshine guitarist Masataka "Polo" Yazaki called Where Giants Fall. They released their first self-titled studio album on November 25, 2021.

== Personal life ==
Bosch married Amy Bosch on March 21, 2003. He has a daughter named Novi and a son named Jetson.

== Filmography ==
=== Voiceover roles ===
==== Anime ====
List of dubbing performances in anime
Year	Title	Role	Notes	Source
2000	Trigun	Vash the Stampede		
2001	Gate Keepers	Reiji Kageyama		
2002	Witch Hunter Robin	Haruto Sakaki		
2003	Last Exile	Claus Valca		
2004	Wolf's Rain	Kiba		
2004	Le Portrait de Petit Cossette	Eiri Kurahashi		
2004	Heaven and Earth	Masataka Takayanagi	As Kevin Hatcher	
2005	Gankutsuou	Albert de Morcerf	As Kevin Hatcher	
2005	Samurai Champloo	Shinsuke	Episode 7	
2005	Fullmetal Alchemist	Lujon	Episode 35	
2005–2009	Naruto	Genma Shiranui		
2006	Boys Be...	Tsuyoshi Ueno	Ep. 4, as Kevin Hatcher	
2006	Eureka Seven	Renton Thurston		
2006–2007	Haré+Guu	Chat	As Kevin Hatcher	
2006–2014	Bleach	Ichigo Kurosaki, Zangetsu/Hollow Ichigo		
2007–2010	The Melancholy of Haruhi Suzumiya	Itsuki Koizumi	2 seasons	
2008	Gurren Lagann	Rossiu Adai		
2008	Code Geass: Lelouch of the Rebellion series	Lelouch vi Britannia		
2008	Lucky Star	Daisuke Ono		
2009–2019	Naruto: Shippuden	Sasori		
2011–2016	Durarara!! series	Izaya Orihara	Also Durarara!!×2	
2012	Blade 2012	Djalal	Episode 7	
2012	Persona 4: The Animation	Yu Narukami, Tohru Adachi		
2012–present	Blue Exorcist series	Yukio Okumura	Blue Exorcist: The Movie and Kyoto Saga	
2013	Pokémon Origins	Brock		
2013	Eureka Seven: AO	Renton Thurston		
2013	Fate/Zero	Ryunosuke Uryu		
2013	K	Saruhiko Fushimi	also Return of Kings and Movie	
2014	Blood Lad	Braz D. Blood		
2014	Doraemon	Noby/Nobita		
2014	Toradora!	Yusaku Kitamura		
2014–2015	Knights of Sidonia	Nagate Tanikaze		
2015	JoJo's Bizarre Adventure	Jonathan Joestar	Phantom Blood	
2015	Free! – Iwatobi Swim Club	Makoto Tachibana	Also Eternal Summer and Dive to the Future	
2015	Magi: The Kingdom of Magic	Titus Alexius		
2015–2017	Yo-kai Watch	Nathan "Nate" Adams, Hovernyan	also The Movie	
2015–2017	Sailor Moon Crystal	Artemis		
2015–2019	Sailor Moon	Artemis	Viz Media dub	
2016	Ajin: Demi-Human	Kei Nagai		
2016	Danganronpa 3: The End of Hope's Peak High School	Hajime Hinata / Izuru Kamukura	Despair Arc, Future Arc, and Hope Arc	
2016	Cyborg 009 VS Devilman	Cyborg 009 aka Joe Shimamura		
2016	Kuromukuro	Ryoto Akagi		
2016–2018	Mobile Suit Gundam: Iron-Blooded Orphans	Orga Itsuka		
2017	Code Geass: Akito the Exiled	Lelouch vi Britannia / Julius Kingsley		
2017	Children of the Whales	Chakuro		
2018	B: The Beginning	Minatsuki		
2018	Devilman Crybaby	Wam	Miniseries	
2018	Pop Team Epic	Popuko, Chomp Chomp Bacon	Episode 8b	
2018	Violet Evergarden	Aiden Field	Episode 11	
2018	Twin Star Exorcists	Shimon Ikaruga		
2018	Legend of the Galactic Heroes: Die Neue These	Mann		
2018	Turning Mecard	Tanatos		
2018	Saint Seiya: The Lost Canvas	Pisces Albafica		
2018	Forest of Piano	Kai Ichinose		
2018–2020	Hi Score Girl	Haruo Yaguchi		
2018–2019	Bungo Stray Dogs	Shousaku Katsura	2 episodes	
2018–present	Baki	Hector Doyle	Netflix ONA	
2019	Mobile Suit Gundam SEED	Dearka Elsman	NYAV Post dub	
2019–2020	Black Clover	Zora Ideale		
2019	Inazuma Eleven: Ares	Trevor Cook		
2019	Marvel Future Avengers	Danny Rand / Iron Fist		
2019	Neon Genesis Evangelion	Toji Suzuhara	Netflix dub	
2019–2024	Kengan Ashura	Ryo Inaba, Takeshi Wakatsuki		
2019	Boruto: Naruto Next Generations	Ryogi		
2019–2024	Demon Slayer: Kimetsu no Yaiba	Giyu Tomioka		
2019	Teasing Master Takagi-san	Hamaguchi	Season 2	
2020	Drifting Dragons	Jiro		
2020–present	Tower of God	Bam	Lead role	
2020	Dorohedoro	13		
2020–present	One Piece	Sabo	Funimation dub	
2021	High-Rise Invasion	Mamoru Aikawa		
2021	Godzilla Singular Point	Yun Arikawa		
2021	Full Dive	Hiroshi Yūki		
2021	Life Lessons with Uramichi Oniisan	Hanabee Kikaku		
2022	Blue Period	Yatora Yaguchi	Lead role	
2022–present	Bleach: Thousand-Year Blood War	Ichigo Kurosaki	Lead role	
2023	Trigun Stampede	Vash the Stampede	Lead role	
2024	Code Geass: Rozé of the Recapture	L. L.	ONA	
2025	Solo Leveling: Arise from the Shadow	Tae-Gyu Lim		
2025	Synduality: Noir	Alba Kuze		
2026	Trigun Stargaze	Vash the Stampede	Lead role	

==== Film ====
Year	Title	Role	Notes	Source
2001	Akira	Shotaro Kaneda	Pioneer dub	
2003	Cardcaptor Sakura Movie 2: The Sealed Card	Eriol Hiragizawa		
2008	5 Centimeters Per Second	Takaki Tohno		
2008	Bleach: Memories of Nobody	Ichigo Kurosaki		
2009	Bleach: The DiamondDust Rebellion	Ichigo Kurosaki		
2011	Trigun: Badlands Rumble	Vash the Stampede		
2011	The Disappearance of Haruhi Suzumiya	Itsuki Koizumi		
2011	Bleach: Fade to Black	Ichigo Kurosaki		
2012	Sengoku Basara: The Last Party	Sanada Yukimura		
2012	Bleach: Hell Verse	Ichigo Kurosaki		
2013	Blue Exorcist: The Movie	Yukio Okumura	Limited theatrical release	
2014	Expelled from Paradise	Frontier Setter		
2016	Mobile Suit Gundam Thunderbolt: December Sky	Daryl Lorenz		
2016–2018	Digimon Adventure tri.	Takeru "T.K." Takaishi	Limited theatrical release, six films	
2017	Mobile Suit Gundam Thunderbolt: Bandit Flower	Daryl Lorenz		
2017	Sailor Moon R: The Movie	Artemis	Limited theatrical release	
2017	Blame!	Atsuji		
2018	Eureka Seven Hi-Evolution	Renton Thurston		
2018	Big Fish & Begonia	Qiu	April 2018	
2018	Sailor Moon S: The Movie	Artemis	Limited theatrical Release	
2018	Sailor Moon SuperS: The Movie	Artemis	Limited theatrical Release	
2018	High Speed! -Free! Starting Days	Makoto Tachibana		
2018	Free! -Timeless Medley- Kizuna	Makoto Tachibana		
2018	Free! -Take Your Marks-	Makoto Tachibana		
2019	The Seven Deadly Sins the Movie: Prisoners of the Sky	Solaad		
2019	Anemone: Eureka Seven Hi-Evolution	Renton Thurston		
2019	Code Geass: Lelouch of the Re;surrection	Lelouch vi Britannia		
2019	Evangelion Death (True)^{2}	Toji Suzuhara	Netflix dub	
2019	Promare	Lio Fotia		
2019	One Piece: Stampede	Sabo		
2020	My Hero Academia: Heroes Rising	Nine		
2020	A Whisker Away	Kento Hinode		
2020	Digimon Adventure: Last Evolution Kizuna	Takeru "T.K." Takaishi	Limited theatrical release	
2021	Demon Slayer: Kimetsu no Yaiba – The Movie: Mugen Train	Giyu Tomioka		
2021	Pretty Guardian Sailor Moon Eternal The Movie	Artemis		
2022	Dragon Ball Super: Super Hero	Broly		
2023	Digimon Adventure 02: The Beginning	Takeru "T.K." Takaishi	Limited theatrical release	
2024	Mobile Suit Gundam SEED Freedom	Yuu Kirishima, Dearka Elthman		
2024	Pretty Guardian Sailor Moon Cosmos The Movie	Artemis	Parts 1 & 2	
2025	Demon Slayer: Kimetsu no Yaiba – The Movie: Infinity Castle	Giyu Tomioka		

==== Animation ====
List of voice performances in animation
Year	Title	Role	Notes	Source
2008	Three Delivery	Sid		
2010	Puppy in My Pocket: Adventures in Pocketville	Magic		
2012–2014	NFL Rush Zone	Troy Kang		
2014–2018	Space Racers	Raven, RoboCoach XL-5, Mini-Bots	Episode "The Haunted Asteroid"	
2015	DC Super Friends	Robin		
2016	Mighty Magiswords	Broccoli Punch, Brock L. Doccoli, Gruntion 1, Whiney, Giant Monster		
2016	Rainbow Ruby	Ling Ling		
2017	Mecard	Tanatos		
2018	Barbie Dreamhouse Adventures	Whittaker Reardon, Mr. Guerrero, Bad Guy in Movie #2		
2019	The Lion Guard	Tompok		
2020	The Idhun Chronicles	Kirtash	English dub	
2022	Lego Monkie Kid	Ne Zha		
2025	Gabriel and the Guardians	Gabriel		
2025–present	Devil May Cry	Dante	Lead role	

==== Video games ====
List of voice performances in video games
Year	Title	Role	Notes	Source
2006	Dirge of Cerberus: Final Fantasy VII	Incidental characters		
2006	Baten Kaitos Origins	Ven		
2006	Valkyrie Profile 2: Silmeria	Kraad, Masato, Roland, Seluvia, Xehnon		
2006	Tales of the Abyss	Guy Cecil		
2006	.hack//G.U. Vol. 1//Rebirth	Kuhn		
2007	.hack//G.U. Vol. 2//Reminisce	Kuhn, NeroNero		
2007	.hack//G.U. Vol. 3//Redemption	Kuhn		
2007	Eternal Sonata	Fugue		
2007	Bleach: The Blade of Fate	Ichigo Kurosaki		
2007	Bleach: Shattered Blade	Ichigo Kurosaki		
2008	Devil May Cry 4	Nero	Also motion capture	
2008	Disgaea 3: Absence of Justice	Almaz von Almandine Adamant		
2008	Tales of Symphonia: Dawn of the New World	Emil Castignier		
2008	Bleach: Dark Souls	Ichigo Kurosaki		
2008	The Last Remnant	Rush Sykes		
2008	Persona 4	Yu Narukami, Tohru Adachi		
2009	Dissidia Final Fantasy	Firion		
2009	Bleach: The 3rd Phantom	Ichigo Kurosaki		
2009	Kamen Rider: Dragon Knight	Dragon Knight, Onyx		
2009	MagnaCarta 2	Juto, Elgar		
2010	Sakura Wars: So Long, My Love	Shinjiro Taiga		
2010	Naruto Shippuden: Ultimate Ninja Heroes 3	Sasori		
2010	Transformers: War for Cybertron	Bumblebee		
2010	Sengoku Basara: Samurai Heroes	Yukimura Sanada		
2011	Marvel vs. Capcom 3: Fate of Two Worlds	Zero	Also in Ultimate Marvel vs. Capcom 3	
2011	Dissidia 012 Final Fantasy	Firion		
2011	The Legend of Heroes: Trails in the Sky	Joshua Bright		
2011	Super Street Fighter IV: Arcade Edition	Yang	Also in Ultra Street Fighter IV	
2011	Bleach: Soul Resurrección	Ichigo Kurosaki		
2011	Naruto Shippuden: Ultimate Ninja Impact	Sasori		
2011	Star Wars: The Old Republic	Torian Cadera		
2012	Binary Domain	Kurosawa		
2012	Naruto Shippuden: Ultimate Ninja Storm Generations	Sasori		
2012	Persona 4 Golden	Yu Narukami, Tohru Adachi		
2012	Persona 4 Arena	Yu Narukami		
2013	Naruto Shippuden: Ultimate Ninja Storm 3	Sasori, Yagura	also in Revolution and 4	
2013	Marvel Heroes	Danny Rand / Iron Fist		
2013	Killer Is Dead	Tokio, Mondo (Kid)		
2014	Danganronpa 2: Goodbye Despair	Hajime Hinata / Izuru Kamukura		
2014	Ar Nosurge	Delta		
2014	Tenkai Knights: Brave Battle	Guren Nash, Bravenwolf		
2014	Persona 4 Arena Ultimax	Yu Narukami, Tohru Adachi		
2014	Persona Q: Shadow of the Labyrinth	Yu Narukami		
2014	Power Rangers Super Megaforce	Super Megaforce Red, Mystic Force Red, Zeo Red, Mighty Morphin Black		
2015	Mortal Kombat X	Kung Jin		
2015	Persona 4: Dancing All Night	Yu Narukami, Tohru Adachi		
2015	The Legend of Heroes: Trails in the Sky SC	Joshua Bright		
2016	Seven Knights	Evan		
2017	Guardians of the Galaxy: The Telltale Series	Bal'Dinn		
2017	The Legend of Heroes: Trails in the Sky the 3rd	Joshua Bright	Archive audio	
2017	Marvel vs. Capcom: Infinite	Zero		
2017	Danganronpa V3: Killing Harmony	Rantaro Amami, Hajime Hinata / Izuru Kamukura		
2017	.hack//G.U. Last Recode	Kuhn	New chapter Vol. 4//Reconnection	
2018	Dissidia Final Fantasy NT	Firion		
2018	BlazBlue: Cross Tag Battle	Yu Narukami, Tohru Adachi		
2018	The Walking Dead: The Final Season	James		
2018	World of Final Fantasy Maxima	Firion		
2018	Super Smash Bros. Ultimate	Zero		
2019	Devil May Cry 5	Nero	Also motion capture	
2019	Marvel Ultimate Alliance 3: The Black Order	Danny Rand / Iron Fist		
2019	Catherine: Full Body	Archie Wallace		
2019	Teppen	Nero, Zero		
2019	Dragon Ball FighterZ	Broly (DBS)		
2020	Dragon Ball Legends	Broly	2020 onwards	
2020	Persona 5 Royal	Yu Narukami, additional voices		
2020	The Legend of Heroes: Trails of Cold Steel IV	Joshua Bright		
2020	Yakuza: Like a Dragon	Masumi Arakawa (young), additional voices		
2021	Power Rangers: Battle for the Grid	Adam Park		
2021	Neo: The World Ends with You	Additional voices		
2021	Demon Slayer: Kimetsu no Yaiba – The Hinokami Chronicles	Giyu Tomioka		
2023	The Legend of Heroes: Trails into Reverie	Joshua Bright, additional voices		
2023	Armored Core VI: Fires of Rubicon	G3 Wu Huahai, additional voices		
2023	Naruto x Boruto: Ultimate Ninja Storm Connections	Sasori, Yagura		
2024	Like a Dragon: Infinite Wealth	Masumi Arakawa		
2024	Final Fantasy VII Rebirth	Additional voices		
2024	Demon Slayer: Kimetsu no Yaiba – Sweep the Board	Giyu Tomioka		
2024	Solo Leveling: Arise	Lim Tae-Gyu		
2024	Dragon Ball: Sparking! Zero	Broly		
2025	Synduality: Echo of Ada	Alba Kuze		
2025	Like a Dragon: Pirate Yakuza in Hawaii	Additional voices		
2025	Bleach: Rebirth of Souls	Ichigo Kurosaki		
2025	Date Everything!	Dirk, Clarence		
2025	Demon Slayer: Kimetsu no Yaiba – The Hinokami Chronicles 2	Giyu Tomioka		
2025	Trails in the Sky 1st Chapter	Joshua Bright, additional voices		
2025	Ys vs. Trails in the Sky: Alternative Saga	Joshua Bright		
2026	Yakuza Kiwami 3 & Dark Ties	Lau Ka Long, additional voices		
2026	Trails in the Sky 2nd Chapter	Joshua Bright, additional voices		
2026	Ace Combat 8: Wings of Theve	Additional voices		
2027	Danganronpa 2×2	Hajime Hinata		
2027	Persona 4 Revival	Tohru Adachi		

=== Live-action dubbing ===
List of English-language dubbings of foreign language live-action media
Year	Title	Country	Dubbed from	Role	Live actor	Source
2013	Violetta	Argentina	Spanish	Napo	Rodrigo Velilla	
2016	Marseille	France	French	Eric	Guillaume Arnault	
2018	Bleach	Japan	Japanese	Ichigo Kurosaki	Sota Fukushi	
2023	Ultraman Blazar	Japan	Japanese	Gento Hiruma	Tomoya Warabino	
2024	Like a Dragon: Yakuza	Japan	Japanese	Akira Nishikiyama	Kento Kaku	

=== Live-action roles ===
List of acting performances in film and television
Year	Title	Role	Notes	Source
1994–95	Mighty Morphin Power Rangers	Adam Park	Seasons 2–3	
1994	Mighty Morphin Power Rangers: Alpha's Magical Christmas	Adam Park	Video short	
1995	Mighty Morphin Power Rangers: The Movie	Adam Park		
1996	Power Rangers Zeo	Adam Park		
1997	Turbo: A Power Rangers Movie	Adam Park		
1997	Power Rangers Turbo	Adam Park	Episodes 1–19 (Shift into Turbo), (Passing the Torch)	
1998	Power Rangers in Space	Adam Park	Episode 25 (Always a Chance)	
1999	Power Rangers: The Lost Episode	Adam Park	Special episode (archival footage)	
2005	Devon's Ghost: Legend of the Bloody Boy	Josh	Also director	
2007	Power Rangers Operation Overdrive	Adam Park	Episodes 20–21 (Once a Ranger)	
2007–11	Anime TV	Host	Video podcast	
2008	Broken Path	Jack Ellis/Hikori		
2010	Hellbinders	Ryu		
2011	Supah Ninjas	Master Shin		
2012	Death Grip	Torch	Direct-to-video release	
2023	Mighty Morphin Power Rangers: Once & Always	Adam Park	30th anniversary special	
2026	Hellfire	Zeke		
2026	Spades	Detective James Bishop	Also director, writer, & executive producer	

== Discography ==
Studio albums

- Red Stripes White Lights (2008)
- My Paper Kingdom (2009)
- Tone of Echoes (2010)
- Sonosis (2011)
- Revolution Airwaves (2012)
- Fall Seven Times, Stand Up Eight (2013)
- Sidewalk Dreams and Chalk Dust (2015)
- Gone Tomorrow (2017)
- Where Giants Fall (2021)

EPs

- How About That (2006)
- I'm Dreaming On (2015)

Compilation albums

- Afterglow (2011)
- Xmas (2011)
- Sansvox (2011) – karaoke album
- Like Yesterday (2012)
- Sansvox II: Acoustic (2014) – karaoke album

== Accolades ==
Year	Award	Category	Work/Recipient	Result	Ref.
2021	5th Crunchyroll Anime Awards	Best Voice Artist Performance (English)	Bam (Tower of God)	Nominated	
2024	8th Crunchyroll Anime Awards	Best Voice Artist Performance (English)	Ichigo Kurosaki (Bleach: Thousand-Year Blood War)	Nominated	

Preceded by Ron Rubin	Voice of Artemis; 2014–present	Succeeded by None
