= Michael Lindsay =

American voice actor (1963–2019)

- Born: May 9, 1963; Washington, D.C., U.S.
- Died: August 31, 2019 (aged 56); Laurel, Maryland, U.S.
- Other name: Dylan Tully
- Occupation: Voice actor
- Years active: 1979–2012
- Children: 2

Michael Lindsay (May 9, 1963 – August 31, 2019) was an American voice actor who worked largely in anime, credited often as Dylan Tully.

His most prominent roles were Kisuke Urahara in Bleach, Kankuro in Naruto, Greymon and Joe Kido in Digimon, and Amuro Ray in the first three Mobile Suit Gundam compilation films.

== Personal life and career ==
Lindsay was born in Washington, D.C., but moved at a young age to New York City. He received a degree in theatre from Adelphi University.

In 2012, Lindsay retired from voice acting due to poor health and most of his anime roles were recast to Doug Erholtz.

== Death ==
Lindsay died on August 31, 2019, at the age of 56. He was living in Laurel, Maryland at the time of his death. He was surrounded by his wife and his two children. The cause of his death has not been revealed but believed to have suffering headaches over the years.

== Dubbing roles ==
=== Animated series English dubbing ===
- Bleach - Kisuke Urahara (eps. 1–231), Sentarō Kotsubaki (ep. 40), Rudbornn Chelute (ep. 153)
- Code Geass - Shinichirō Tamaki
- Cromartie High School - Maeda's Mom (Madstone Version)
- Digimon Adventure / Digimon Adventure 02 - Greymon, Joe Kido
- Digimon Data Squad - Gotsumon
- Dinozaurs - Rick
- Fushigi Yûgi - Tomite
- Kaze no Yojimbo - George Kodama
- Marmalade Boy - Yuu Matsuura
- Mobile Suit Gundam (Movies I-III English Dub) - Amuro Ray (as Dylan Tully)
- Naruto - Kankuro
- Naruto: Shippuden - Kankuro (2009-2012)
- Outlaw Star - Tobigera
- s-CRY-ed - Kyoji Mujo
- Serial Experiments Lain - Delivery Guy (ep. 2) (as Dylan Tully)
- The Big O - Police (ep. 22)
- Transformers: Robots in Disguise - Rollbar, Skid-Z
- Vampire Princess Miyu - Man, Man on Bike, Mr. Sone, Policeman, Shidon
- Wolf's Rain - Driver (ep.6), Additional Voices
- Zatch Bell! - Apollo

=== Animated film English dubbing ===
- Akira - Yamagata (as Dylan Tully) (2001 Pioneer dub)
- Bleach: Memories of Nobody - Kisuke Urahara
- Bleach: The DiamondDust Rebellion - Kisuke Urahara
- Cowboy Bebop: The Movie - Taxi Driver
- Digimon: The Movie - Joe Kido, Greymon
- Digimon: Revenge of Diaboromon - Joe Kido
- Naruto the Movie 2: Legend of the Stone of Gelel - Kankuro

=== Video games English dubbing ===
- Bleach: Shattered Blade - Kisuke Urahara
- Bleach: The Blade of Fate - Kisuke Urahara
- Bleach: Dark Souls - Kisuke Urahara
- Bleach: The 3rd Phantom - Kisuke Urahara
- Castlevania: Lament of Innocence - Joachim Armster
- Final Fantasy XIII - Cocoon Inhabitants
- Gundam Side Story 0079: Rise from the Ashes - Additional Voices
- Shadow of Rome - Cassius Longiness, Additional Voices
- Zatch Bell! Mamodo Fury - Apollo
- Naruto series - Kankuro

== Filmography ==
=== Animated series ===
- The Grim Adventures of Billy & Mandy - Bobby (Episode: "Whatever Happened to Billy Whatsisname?")
- The Mullets - (Episode: "Touched by a Mullet")
- Squirrel Boy - Cop
