= Steve Prince =

American voice actor

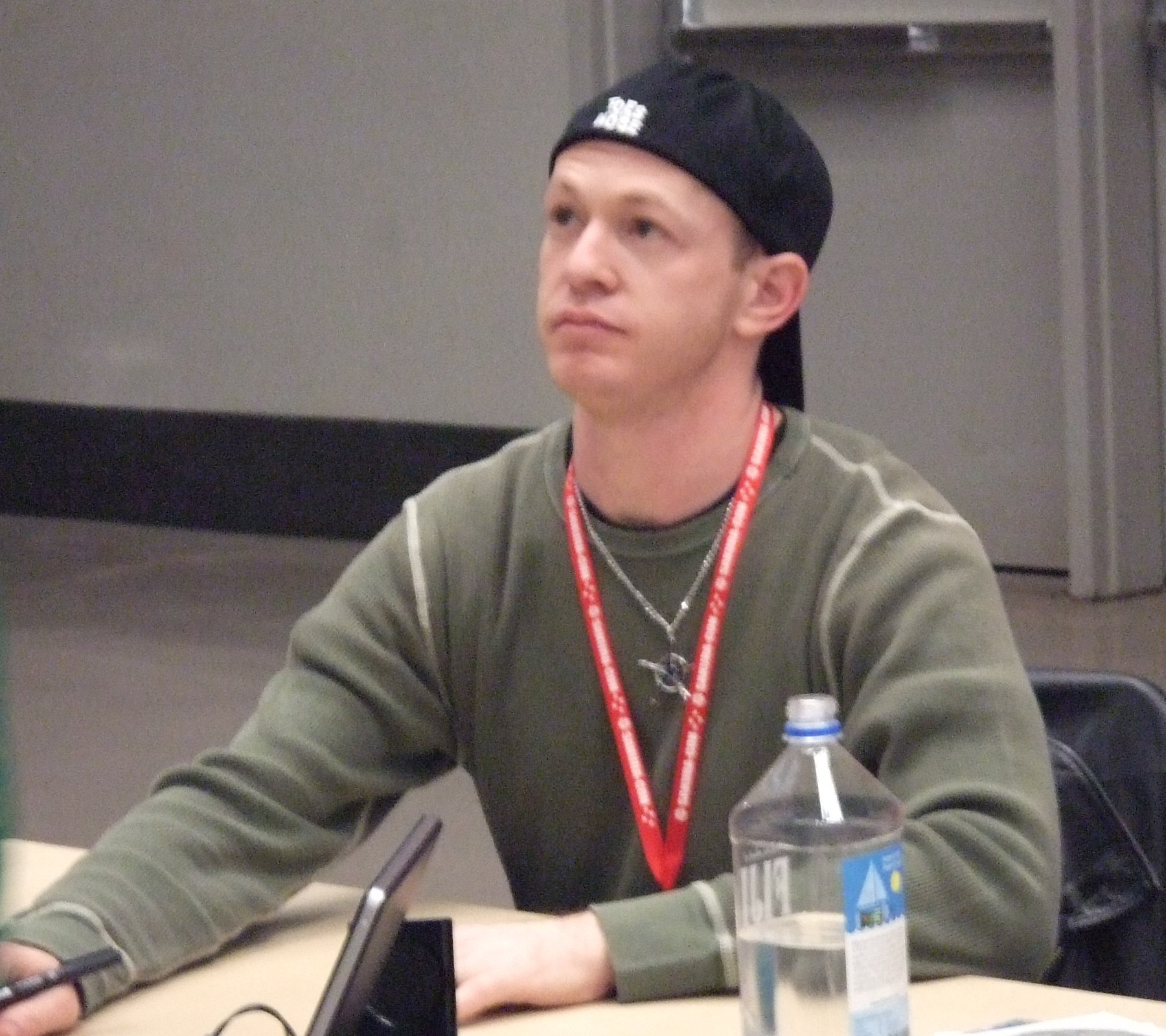
- Prince at the 2008 Sakuracon
- Other names: David Umansky; Steven Prince; Derek Stephen Prince
- Occupation: Voice actor
- Years active: 1994–present
- Notable credits: Bleach as Uryū Ishida; Naruto as Shino Aburame; Love Hina as Keitarō Urashima; Kingdom Hearts as Vexen
- Spouse: Amy Loretta Hollander
- Children: 3
- Website: www.myspace.com/steveprinceproductions

Steve Prince (credited as Derek Stephen Prince until 2024) is an American voice actor who provided the voice of Elgar in the live-action Power Rangers Turbo and Power Rangers in Space series, along with various characters in the Digimon series.

In the field of anime dubbing, he has played Keitaro Urashima in Love Hina, DemiDevimon and Piedmon in Digimon, Ken Ichijouji and Veemon in Digimon 02 and Impmon in Digimon Tamers, Uryū Ishida in Bleach, Iggy in JoJo's Bizarre Adventure: Stardust Crusaders and Shino Aburame in Naruto. In video games, he provides the voice of Vexen and his original self, Even, in the Kingdom Hearts series and Asuka Kreutz in the Guilty Gear series. He also provided the voices for Fuyuhiko Kuzuryu and Kokichi Oma in the Danganronpa series. Prince has been part of the Voice123 roster since September 2008. He reprised his role as Ken Ichijouji for YouTuber Aficionados Chris' review of Digimon.

== Filmography ==
=== Anime ===
- .hack//Legend of the Twilight – Reki
- Accel World – Sulfur Pot (Ep. 19)
- Aldnoah.Zero – Marylcian
- Apocalypse Zero – Bolt
- Argento Soma – Lab Assistant B
- Arc the Lad – Gene
- Battle B-Daman – Li Yong Fa, Monkey Don
- Beyblade Burst – Ranjiro Kiyama (Seasons 3 & 5)
- Blade of the Immortal – Taito Magatsu
- Bleach – Uryū Ishida
- Bleach: Thousand Year Blood War – Uryū Ishida
- Blood Lad – Sabao
- Blue Exorcist – Reiji Shiratori / Astaroth (Eps. 1-2)
- Bobobo-bo Bo-bobo – Nunchuck Nick, Wiggin' Tribe Spokesman
- Code Geass R2 – Additional Voices
- Cowboy Bebop – Lin, Shin
- Cyborg 009 – Dr. Gaia, Machine Gun, Kain, alternate voice of Joe Shimamura (select episodes)
- D.Gray-man – Selim (Ep. 43)
- Demon Slayer: Kimetsu no Yaiba – Spider Demon (Elder Brother), Goto
- Digimon Adventure – DemiDevimon, Piedmon, Digitamamon
- Digimon Adventure 02 – Ken Ichijouji, DemiVeemon/Veemon/ExVeemon/Paildramon (shared)/Imperialdramon (shared)
- Digimon Frontier – Grumblemon/Gigasmon, Dynasmon, Oryxmon, Honeybeemon
- Digimon Fusion – Jeremy Tsurugi, Zamielmon
- Digimon Tamers – Impmon/Beelzemon
- Doraemon – Sunekichi
- Dragon Ball Super – Freeza (Toonami Asia dub)
- Duel Masters 2.0 – Dr. Root and Multi-Card Monty
- Durarara!! – Gangster (Ep. 12.5), Additional Voices
- Eyeshield 21 – Yoichi Hiruma
- Flint the Time Detective – Batterball, Elekin, Young Orville Wright (Ep. 17), Young Jean-Henri Fabre (ep. 30)
- Fushigi Yūgi – Keisuke Yūki
- Ghost in the Shell: Stand Alone Complex 2nd Gig – Runaway worker in the episode "Excavation"
- Ghost in the Shell: SAC_2045 – Underwear Man
- Ground Defense Force! Mao-chan – Ichiro Suteki
- Gurren Lagann – Jamo-ichi
- Gun Frontier – Tochiro Oyama
- Hunter × Hunter – Lippo, Shacmono Tocino, Examinee A (Ep. 6)
- JoJo's Bizarre Adventure: Stardust Crusaders – Iggy
- Kikaider – Ichiro/Kikaider 0-1
- Kill la Kill – Guts
- Kite Liberator – Tsuin
- Love Hina – Keitaro Urashima (as David Umansky)
- Lucky ☆ Star – Cherry, Additional Voices
- Lupin III – Mr. X, French Police Officer
- Mahoromatic – Suguru Misato (credited as David Umansky)
- MÄR: Märchen Awakens Romance – Phantom/Tom
- Mars Daybreak – Crowley
- Mobile Suit Gundam F91 – Birgit Pirjo
- Mon Colle Knights – Mondo Ooya
- Monster – Rudy Gillen
- Naruto – Shino Aburame (episode 34-220)
- Naruto: Shippuden – Shino Aburame (episode 33-500)
- Nightwalker – Koichi Akiba
- Overman King Gainer – Bello Korossha
- Paradise Kiss – Arashi Nagase
- Patlabor WXIII – Shizuo Miyanomori, Police Officer
- Planetes – Chung
- Persona 4: The Animation – Naoki Konishi
- Redline – Little Deyzuna
- Rurouni Kenshin – Beshimi, Sawagejo Cho, misc. voices
- Samurai Champloo – Tomonoshin Shibui, Denkibou
- S-CRY-ed – George Tatsunami, Masaki
- Shinzo – King Nipper, Professor Parasite
- Sins of the Flesh (OVA) – Adolpho
- Stitch! – Kenny
- Sword Art Online – Kibao (Ep. 2)
- Tenjho Tenge – Tsutomu Ryuuzaki
- Trigun – Zazie the Beast (credited as David Umansky)
- Vampire Knight series – Class Representative, Hunter Association President, Additional Voices
- Vampire Princess Miyu – Yasuhiro Takashima, Cat
- Yukikaze – Captain Tom "Tomahawk" John

=== Animation ===
- Chaotic – Codemaster Tirasis
- Lilo & Stitch: The Series – Luki
- NFL Rush Zone – Jackson, Seahawks Rusher
- Shorty McShorts' Shorts – Phil, Boomer
- Zentrix – Zeus

=== Live-action television ===
- Big Bad Beetleborgs – Noxic, Super Noxic (voice) (credited as David Umansky)
- ER – Fireman
- Profiler – Damion Kanaras
- Power Rangers Zeo – Auric the Conqueror, Staroid, Digster (voice) (all uncredited)
- Power Rangers Turbo – Elgar (voice) (credited main role, as David Umansky), Flamite (voice), Wild Weeder (voice) (uncredited)
- Power Rangers in Space – Elgar (voice) (credited 1st half of season, as David Umansky, uncredited 2nd half), Tankenstein (voice) (uncredited)
- Power Rangers Lost Galaxy – Treacheron (voice), Fishface (second voice)
- Power Rangers Time Force – Jetara (voice)
- Power Rangers Wild Force – Tire Org (voice)
- Saved by the Bell: The New Class – Tuba Player

=== Film ===
- Bio Zombie – Crazy Bee (voice) (credited as David Umansky)
- Bleach: Memories of Nobody – Uryū Ishida
- Bleach: The DiamondDust Rebellion – Uryū Ishida
- Bleach: Hell Verse – Uryū Ishida
- Blue Exorcist: The Movie – Reiji Shiratori
- Digimon: The Movie – Veemon, DemiVeemon, Pizza Guy
- Digimon: Revenge of Diaboromon – Ken Ichijouji, Veemon, DemiVeemon, ExVeemon, Imperialdramon (shared)
- Digimon: Battle of Adventurers – Takehito Uehara: Minami's Dad
- Digimon: Runaway Locomon – Beelzemon
- Digimon Adventure: Last Evolution Kizuna – DemiVeemon/Veemon/ExVeemon, Ken Ichijouji
- Digimon Adventure 02: The Beginning – Veemon, Ken Ichijouji
- Digimon Adventure 02: Digimon Hurricane Touchdown!! / Transcendent Evolution! The Golden Digimentals (standalone dub) - Veemon, DemiVeemon
- Jungle Shuffle – Louca (credited as Steve Prince)
- Lu over the Wall – Chief Priest of Shrine
- Naruto Shippuden 3: Inheritors of the Will of Fire – Shino Aburame
- Ni no Kuni – Master Zeelok
- Scary Movie 3 - Aliens (Shared with Tom Kenny Uncredited)
- Time of Eve – Koji
- Turbo: A Power Rangers Movie – Elgar (voice)
- Versus – Beard (voice) (credited as David Umansky)
- Waking Life – Man Talking to Bartender (voice) (credited as Steven Prince)

=== Video games ===
- .hack//INFECTION – Nuke Usagimaru (as Steven Prince)
- .hack//MUTATION – Nuke Usagimaru (as Steven Prince)
- .hack//OUTBREAK – Nuke Usagimaru (as Steven Prince)
- .hack//QUARANTINE – Nuke Usagimaru (as Steven Prince)
- Bleach: Shattered Blade – Uryū Ishida
- Bleach: The Blade of Fate – Uryū Ishida
- Bleach: Dark Souls – Uryū Ishida
- Bleach: The 3rd Phantom – Uryū Ishida
- Bleach: Soul Resurrección – Uryū Ishida
- Catherine: Full Body – Abul Bahril
- Danganronpa 2: Goodbye Despair – Fuyuhiko Kuzuryu
- Danganronpa 2×2 – Fuyuhiko Kuzuryu
- Danganronpa V3: Killing Harmony - Kokichi Oma
- Demon Slayer: Kimetsu no Yaiba – The Hinokami Chronicles – Kakushi, Spider Demon (Elder Brother)
- Digimon All-Star Rumble – Veemon/ExVeemon, Imperialdramon Paladin Mode Impmon/Beelzemon
- Digimon Rumble Arena – Ken Ichijouji, Veemon/Imperialdramon (shared), Imperialdramon Paladin Mode (shared), Impmon/Beelzemon
- Eureka Seven vol.1: New Wave – Hooky Zueff (uncredited)
- Guilty Gear -STRIVE- – Lucifero, Asuka R. Kreutz
- Kingdom Hearts Re:Chain of Memories – Vexen
- Kingdom Hearts 358/2 Days – Vexen (archival audio)
- Kingdom Hearts Birth by Sleep – Even
- Kingdom Hearts HD 1.5 Remix – Vexen (archive footage)
- Kingdom Hearts HD 2.5 Remix – Vexen/Even (archived and new footage)
- Kingdom Hearts III – Vexen/Even
- Kingdom Hearts: Melody of Memory – Even
- Like a Dragon: Infinite Wealth – Additional voices
- Like a Dragon: Pirate Yakuza in Hawaii – Additional voices
- Naruto series – Shino Aburame, Shima
- Master Detective Archives: Rain Code – Servan
- Persona 3 – Takaya Sakaki
- The Legend of Heroes: Trails of Cold Steel – Patrick Hyarms
- The Legend of Heroes: Trails of Cold Steel IV – President Samuel Rocksmith, Patrick Hyarms
