= Vic Mignogna =

American voice actor (born 1962)

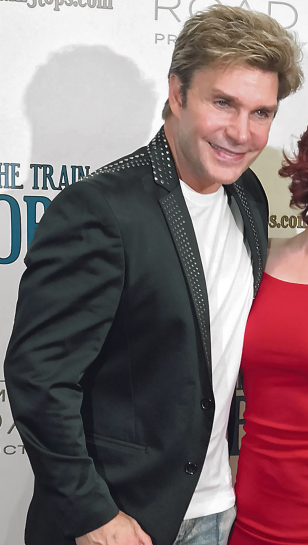
- Mignogna in 2020
- Born: Victor Joseph Mignogna; August 27, 1962 (age 64); Greensburg, Pennsylvania, U.S.
- Occupations: Voice actor; musician
- Years active: 1999–present
- Spouses: Seliece Womble (m. 1995; div. 2002) Dominique Sachse (m. 2024)
- Partner: Michele Specht (2006–2018)
- Musical career
- Genres: Pop; Christian; gospel
- Instruments: Piano; vocals
- Years active: 1989–present (Note: 1999 was the year that Mignogna began voice acting for anime dubs for television shows and videos. He has been composing and producing music since DC Talk's album in 1989 and appeared on television in 1993 as a contestant on Star Search.)
- Website: www.vicmignogna.com

Victor Joseph Mignogna (/mɪnˈjɒnə/ min-YO-nuh; born August 27, 1962) is an American voice actor and musician known primarily for his extensive contributions to the English dubbing of Japanese anime series and video games, including Edward Elric in the Fullmetal Alchemist franchise, which earned him the American Anime Award for Best Actor in 2007. He has voiced characters in over 100 anime and video game titles, including Dragon Ball Z, Bleach, Code Geass, Shin-chan, and Hell Girl.

Other animation roles include Broly from the Dragon Ball films, Tamaki Suoh in Ouran High School Host Club, Fai D. Flowright in Tsubasa: Reservoir Chronicle, Dark in D.N.Angel, Kurz Weber in the Full Metal Panic! series, Zero and Ichiru Kiryu in the Vampire Knight series, Christopher Aonuma in Digimon Fusion, Nagato and Obito Uchiha in Naruto Shippuden, Kougaiji in Saiyuki, Ikkaku Madarame in Bleach, Rohan Kishibe in JoJo's Bizarre Adventure: Diamond Is Unbreakable, Hideki Kurohagi in Marvel Anime: Wolverine, Qrow Branwen in RWBY, and Matt Ishida in Digimon Adventure tri. In video games, he has voiced E-123 Omega in the Sonic the Hedgehog series and Junpei Iori from Persona 3. In live-action work, he has participated in several Star Trek fan productions, including Star Trek Continues, as Captain James T. Kirk. In music, he has released eight studio albums and eight audio recordings.

In early 2019, following allegations of sexual harassment from both fans and fellow voice actors amid the #MeToo movement, Mignogna was dismissed from Funimation and Rooster Teeth; Mignogna has denied the accusations. Mignogna unsuccessfully pursued defamation cases against Funimation and his accusers. Despite a reduction in public appearances following the harassment allegations, Mignogna has continued to participate in conventions and events.

== Early life ==
Mignogna was born on August 27, 1962, in Greensburg, Pennsylvania to Barb Myers. He grew up watching cartoons on television. One of his favorites was Speed Racer, a cult classic animated show based on a Japanese comic strip by Tatsuo Yoshida. He was also a fan of Star Trek: The Original Series.

He graduated from Liberty University with a degree in television and film production, and taught English and speech at Trinity Christian Academy in Jacksonville, Florida. He was a summer seasonal officer with the Ocean City Police Department. In 1990, Mignogna moved to Houston, Texas, where he was a film and video production instructor at The Art Institute of Houston.

== Career ==
=== Voice acting ===
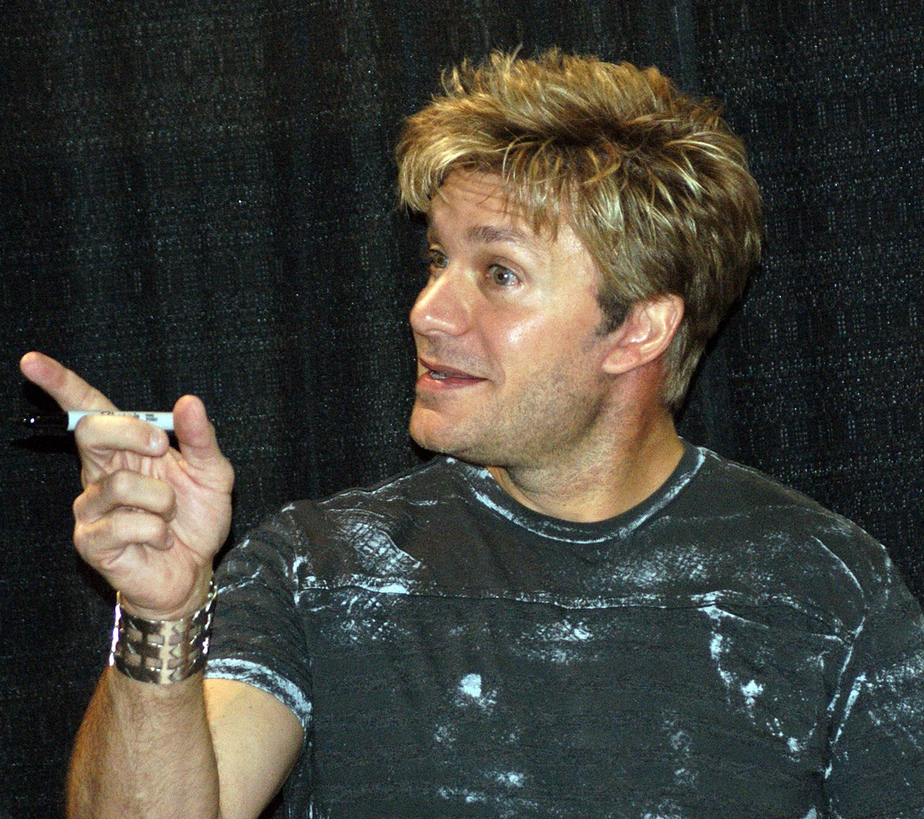
Mignogna at a comic expo in Calgary, Alberta, Canada, June 2011

Vic Mignogna has voiced characters in over 100 anime and video game titles, including Dragon Ball Z, Bleach, Code Geass, Shin-chan, and Hell Girl.

While working in video production with John Gremillion in Houston, Mignogna got involved in voice acting at ADV Films. He debuted as Vega in the video game-based anime series Street Fighter II V. Mignogna started attending anime conventions, where he contacted Funimation and landed the voice role of Broly in the Dragon Ball Z movies, as well as Dragon Ball Super: Broly.

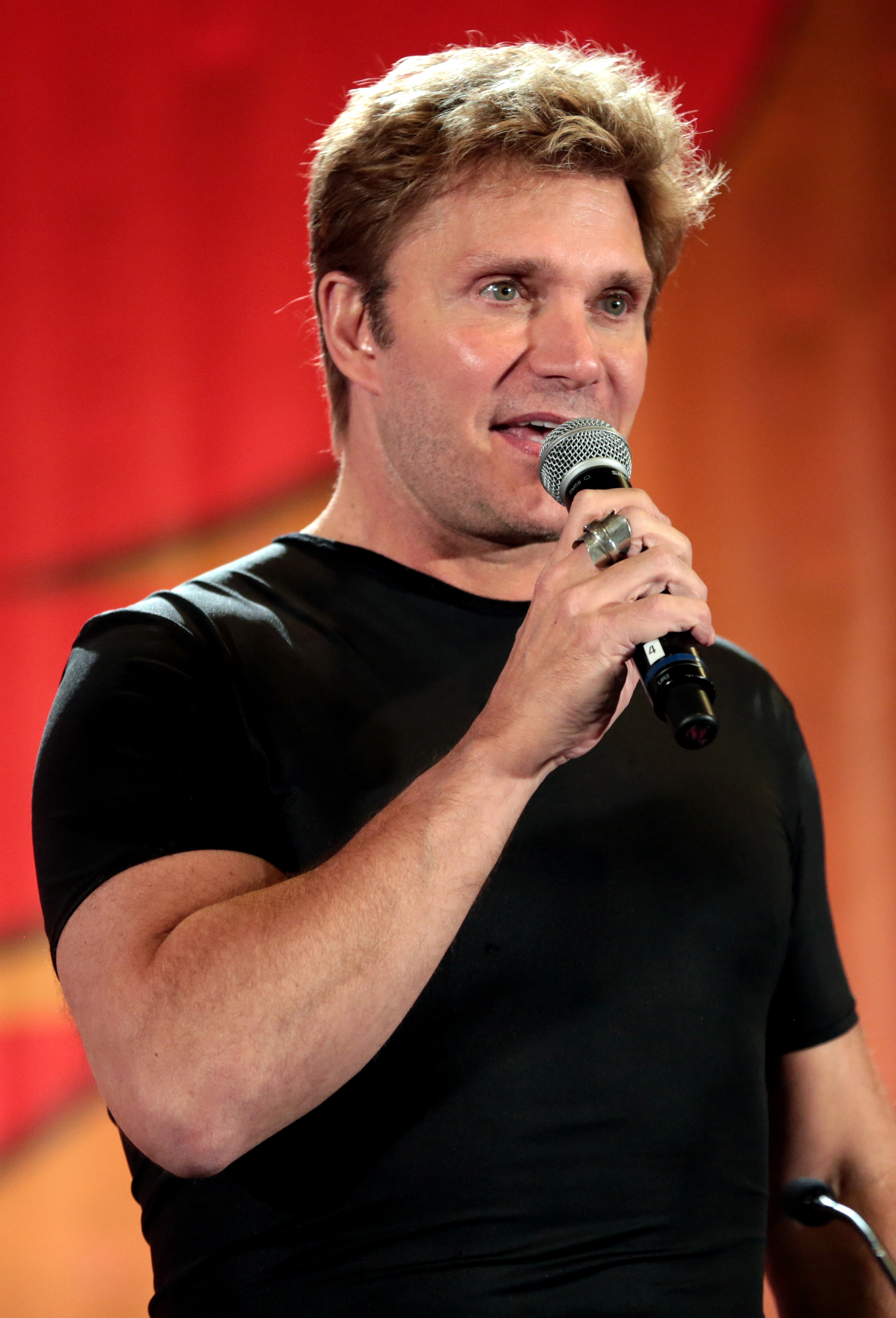
Mignogna speaking at Phoenix Comicon 2017

In 2007, the American Anime Awards presented Mignogna with an award for Best Actor for his work on Fullmetal Alchemist. He often gains attention for his role in Alchemist, and at one point attended between 15 and 25 conventions per year. One of Mignogna's career goals was "to record at all of the major places where dubbing is done." He said he was "the first ADV voice actor to record at Funimation in Dallas and then I was the first to go to New York." He has also recorded in Los Angeles; he tried out for Bleach and received the part of Ikkaku Madarame. In non-anime productions, he voiced Qrow Branwen in Rooster Teeth's web series RWBY.

Mignogna appeared in several fan productions, including Fullmetal Fantasy and Star Trek: Phase II. In the latter series, he co-directed the episode "Enemy: Starfleet" and played the Andorian Captain. He directed "KITUMBA" and played Malkthon the Klingon, and was slated to direct the episode "Mindsifter." In 2012, Mignogna worked with the Starship Farragut production group. He directed and starred as Captain James T. Kirk in their web series Star Trek Continues. Mignogna has received positive reviews for writing, directing, executive-producing, and starring in Star Trek Continues, especially for his portrayal of the character of Kirk, using William Shatner's unique mannerisms and cadence.

In 2021, he founded his own dubbing studio with convention Anime Matsuri in partnership.

In 2024, Mignogna announced he has partnered with UK talent agency 'Davidson & Co. Talent Agents.'

=== Music ===
Mignogna has been involved in music, sound, and video production. As of 2024, he has released eight studio albums and eight audio recordings. He has produced hundreds of jingles for commercials, and he was a worship leader with Houston's First Baptist Church. He helped produce and arrange some of the songs on DC Talk's eponymous first album, released in 1989. In 1993, he was a contestant on the American television talent show Star Search, on which he sang "Worth Waiting For." Mignogna has sung the U.S. national anthem at several Houston Astros baseball games. As a musician, he has released several albums, some of which feature English cover versions of anime songs from shows, including the Funimation dub of One Piece and the Dragon Ball series. He also handled some of the ADR direction for the English dub of Claymore, in which he voices Rigaldo.

== Personal life ==
=== Relationships ===
Mignogna was previously married to Seliece Womble from 1995 to 2002, and was in a relationship with actress Michele Specht from 2006 to May 2018. On July 24, 2024, during one of his weekly livestreams on Twitch, he announced to his fans that he had gotten married a few weeks prior. On August 15, 2024, it was later revealed that Mignogna had married television personality Dominique Sachse, whom he had first met in their 20s and had reconnected with in 2023. They share a residence in the Dallas-Fort Worth area.

=== Legal battles and sexual harassment allegations ===
In January 2019, allegations of homophobia and sexual harassment against Mignogna emerged on Twitter via the MeToo movement, coinciding with the English release of Dragon Ball Super: Broly, which features his voice work. The claims, some dating to his 1989 career start, alleged nonconsensual hugging and kissing of fans, including minors. Voice actresses Monica Rial and Jamie Marchi accused him of harassing them. Mignogna denied the allegations and expressed regret for any discomfort from his interactions.

On January 22, 2019, Tammi Denbow, executive director of employee relations at Sony Pictures, started an internal investigation based on reports from Rial, two female fans, and a former Funimation employee. The investigation ended a week later with Mignogna's dismissal, and Funimation announced it would not hire Mignogna for future productions. On February 5, Rooster Teeth cut ties with him. On February 11, Funimation recast his role as the Executive in The Morose Mononokean. Multiple anime conventions removed him from their guest lists.

At Bak-Anime 2019 and in a Twitter post, Mignogna expressed regret for unintended discomfort and denied malicious intent. His supporters started a crowdfunding campaign called "Vic Kicks Back," which raised over $262,000 for his legal defense. On Twitter, Mignogna confirmed retaining a law firm for legal action and stated surplus funds would go to the Salvation Army Dallas Domestic Violence Abuse Shelters. Mignogna filed a million-dollar lawsuit for defamation, tortious interference, and civil conspiracy against Funimation, Rial, Marchi, and Rial's fiancé Ron Toye in Tarrant County District Court. Funimation denied Mignogna's allegations in a June 12, 2019, response.

Mignogna was deposed on June 26, 2019. In his deposition, he denied kissing Rial or inappropriate behavior, stating interactions were consensual and misinterpreted. On July 1, 2019, Funimation filed an anti-SLAPP motion under the Texas Citizens Participation Act to dismiss the lawsuit, claiming protected free speech. Rial, Marchi, and Toye filed anti-SLAPP motions on July 19, supported by affidavits from voice actress Kara Edwards, Michele Specht, and claims of harassing Mari Iijima. On July 30, an affidavit from the two fans in Funimation's investigation was submitted.

On September 6, 2019, State District Judge John Chupp dismissed 7 of 12 claims under the Texas Citizens Participation Act, ordering Mignogna to pay Marchi's legal fees as protected speech. On October 4, 2019, the court dismissed the remaining claims under the act's free speech protection. Mignogna appealed on October 24, with a hearing on November 21. The judge ruled Mignogna must pay defendants' attorney fees of $238,042.42, including $15,000 in sanctions.

In a January 2020 livestream, Mignogna reiterated his innocence and denied forced advances. In February 2022, Rial and Marchi hosted a podcast on the case.

On August 18, 2022, the Texas Second Court of Appeals affirmed the dismissal and increased attorneys' fees to Rial and Toye to $282,953.80 from $100,000. The court denied Mignogna's appeal in September 2022. On November 14, 2022, Mignogna filed a petition for review in the Supreme Court of Texas, which denied it on December 30, 2022.

== Filmography ==
=== Anime ===
List of dubbing performances in anime
Year	Title	Role	Notes	Source
1999	Street Fighter II V	Vega	ADV dub, debut role	
1999	Martian Successor Nadesico	Ikeda	Episode 19	
2000	Gasaraki	Colonel Ogawa		
2000	Generator Gawl	Gawl Kudo		
2001	Orphen	Cox, Lai		
2001	Princess Nine	Hiroki Takasugi		
2002	Steel Angel Kurumi	Bully Leader	Episodes 1, 4	
2002	Excel Saga	Wolf	Episode 10	
2003	Noir	Domenic, Heinz, Wellman		
2003	RahXephon	Mamoru Torigai		
2003	Rune Soldier	Leonard		
2003	Saiyuki	Kougaiji		
2003	Aura Battler Dunbine	Neal Given		
2003	Najica Blitz Tactics	Yoshiki, Various characters		
2003	Super GALS!	Good Looking Guy, Kouichi Akagi	Episodes 18, 20	
2003	Angelic Layer	Host		
2003	Saint Seiya	Jabu, Lizard Misty		
2003	All Purpose Cultural Cat Girl Nuku Nuku	Young President		
2003	Original Dirty Pair: Flight 005 Conspiracy	Dornenschtern		
2003	Original Dirty Pair: Affair on Nolandia	Officer		
2003	Orphen Revenge	Lai, Montgomery		
2003	Legend of the Mystical Ninja	Goemon		
2003–05	Full Metal Panic! series	Kurz Weber, Pony Man, Béart		
2003–04	YuYu Hakusho	Ura Urashima, Bui		
2003–04	Fullmetal Alchemist	Edward Elric		
2004	Neon Genesis Evangelion	Shigeru Aoba	Director's Cut	
2004	Kiddy Grade	Dextera		
2004	Kino's Journey	Various characters		
2004	Kaleido Star	Master Linn, Ian, Investor, Arlon Brass	Episodes 9, 12, 24, 25	
2004	Megazone 23 series	Shogo Yahagi		
2004	Gravion series	Raven		
2004	Aquarian Age: Sign for Evolution	Shingo Hirota		
2004	Peacemaker	Tatsunosuke Ichimura		
2004	Mezzo DSA	Mugiyama		
2004	Sister Princess	Mac Yamato	Episode 2	
2004	Giant Robo	Zangetsu	Episode 6	
2004	D.N. Angel	Dark Mousy		
2004	Cyber Team in Akihabara	Shimabukuro Sengakuji (Grandpa)		
2004	Spiral: The Bonds of Reasoning	Hunter	Episodes 18, 19, 20	
2005	Gatchaman	Takahara	ADV dub, episode 3	
2005	Daphne in the Brilliant Blue	Davis	Episodes 15, 16	
2005	Initial D	Shingo Shoji	Funimation dub	
2005	Madlax	Carrossea Doon		
2006	Diamond Daydreams	Radio Boy	Episode 9	
2006	Misaki Chronicles	Goemon Ishikawa	Episodes 3,4	
2006	Super Dimension Fortress Macross	Hikaru Ichijyo		
2006	Princess Tutu	Femio	Episode 17	
2006	UFO Ultramaiden Valkyrie	Mar		
2006	Tactics	Sugino		
2006	Papuwa	Gionkamen Arashiyama		
2006	Trinity Blood	Virgil Walsh		
2006	Nerima Daikon Brothers	Katuhama	Episode 7	
2007	Jinki: Extend	Kalis		
2007	Utawarerumono	Benawi		
2007	Guyver: The Bioboosted Armor	Dr. Shirai		
2007	Tsubasa: Reservoir Chronicle	Fai D. Flowright		
2007	Rozen Maiden	Mada Pearl		
2007	The Melancholy of Haruhi Suzumiya	Yutaka Tamaru		
2007	009-1	Priest, Egg	Episodes 1, 3	
2007	Mushishi	Kisuke	Episode 14	
2007	Air	Yukito Kunisaki		
2007	Innocent Venus	Jin Tsurasawa		
2007	Pumpkin Scissors	Hans		
2007	Xenosaga: The Animation	Wilhelm		
2007	Suzuka	Tetsuhito Kinugasa		
2007	Air Gear	Sora Takeuchi	Episode 13, 14, 15	
2007	Le Chevalier D'Eon	Sir Dashwood		
2007	Kurau Phantom Memory	Regal Delyus		
2007–14	Bleach	Ikkaku Madarame, Senbonzakura		
2008	Hell Girl	Yoshiyuki Honjo	Episode 4	
2008	Shuffle!	Forbesii (King of Demons)		
2008	Tokyo Majin	Tendo Kozunu		
2008	The Wallflower	Takenaga Oda		
2008	Lucky Star	Guest characters	Episodes 13–16	
2008	Claymore	Rigaldo		
2008	Darker than Black	Itzahk	Episodes 13, 14	
2008–09	Code Geass R2	Luciano Bradley		
2008–09	Ouran High School Host Club	Tamaki Suoh		
2009	Kenichi: The Mightiest Disciple	Kensei Ma		
2009	D.Gray-man	Akuma Clown, Alphonse Clouse		
2009	Chrome Shelled Regios	Lintens Savoled Harden		
2009	Murder Princess	Falis's Father	Episode 5	
2009	Heroic Age	Rom Ror		
2009	Kaze no Stigma	Takeya Ōgami		
2009	Dragon Ball Z Kai	Burter		
2009–10	Fullmetal Alchemist: Brotherhood	Edward Elric	Also OVAs	
2010–11	Kekkaishi	Yoshimori Sumimura		
2010	Linebarrels of Iron	Eiji Kiriyama		
2010	One Piece	Captain Nezumi, Wetton, Lake	Funimation dub	
2010	Soul Eater	Spirit Albarn		
2010	A Certain Scientific Railgun	Trick	Episode 9	
2010	Oh! Edo Rocket	Tetsuju		
2010	Vampire Knight series	Zero Kiryu, Ichiru Kiryu		
2010	Marvel Anime: Iron Man	Righella, Operator		
2010–14	Hetalia series	Greece		
2010–19	Naruto: Shippuden	Young Obito Uchiha, Nagato, Fuen		
2011	Birdy the Mighty Decode	Kinzel	Episode 5	
2011	Sengoku Basara: Samurai Kings	Akechi Mitsuhide		
2011	Marvel Anime: Wolverine	Hideki Kurohagi, Takagi		
2011	Coicent	Shinichi		
2011	Chaos:HEad	Shogon/General	Also on Chaos:Child Episode 00	
2012	Dream Eater Merry	Ryota Iijima		
2012	Panty & Stocking with Garterbelt	Oscar	Episode 5	
2012	Persona 4: The Animation	Kou Ichijo		
2012	Nura: Rise of the Yokai Clan	Inugamigyobu Tamazuki		
2012	Sword Art Online	Salamander Soldier (Ep. 16), Salamander Mage (Ep. 19), Slug Scientist #1	Episode 21	
2012	Level E	Prince Baka		
2013	Accel World	Yellow Radio	Episodes 11, 12	
2013	Magi: The Labyrinth of Magic	Koubun Ka		
2013	Tiger & Bunny			
2013–14	Lagrange: The Flower of Rin-ne series	Moid		
2013–15	Digimon Fusion	Christopher Aonuma, MadLeomon, Leomon, Piximon		
2014	Karneval	Karoku		
2014	Sailor Moon	Ryo Urawa	Viz dub, Episodes 27, 41	
2014	Attack on Titan	Eld Gin		
2014	Space Dandy	Gentle Nobra	Episodes 18, 19	
2015	Tokyo Ravens	Yoshitaka Makihara		
2015	Unbreakable Machine-Doll	Sin		
2015	The Heroic Legend of Arslan	Silvermask		
2015	Show by Rock!! series	SHU☆ZO (English lyricist for Trichronika's songs)		
2015	Free! series	Rin Matsuoka		
2015–16	Durarara!!×2	Kasuka Heiwajima		
2016	Rage of Bahamut: Genesis	Beelzebub		
2016	Black Butler: Book of Circus	Peter		
2016	Brothers Conflict	Futo Asahina		
2016	Bungo Stray Dogs	Rampo Edogawa	Season 1 and 2 only	
2016	Garo: The Animation	Mendoza		
2016	The Vision of Escaflowne	Folken Fanel	Funimation dub	
2016	The Asterisk War	Randy Hooke		
2016	Fairy Tail	Mard Geer		
2016	One-Punch Man	Melzargard		
2016	Nanbaka	Kenshirou Yozakura		
2016	Joker Game	Price	Episode 10	
2016	Yuri on Ice	Commentator		
2016	Drifters	Saint-Germi	Episode 6	
2016–18	Touken Ranbu: Hanamaru series	Mikazuki Munechika	Episode 5	
2017	The Reflection	X-On		
2017	Juni Taisen: Zodiac War		ADR director	
2018	That Time I Got Reincarnated as a Slime	Gelmud		
2018	Twin Star Exorcists	Yuto Ijika		
2018	JoJo's Bizarre Adventure: Diamond Is Unbreakable	Rohan Kishibe		
2018–19	Baki	Shibukawa		
2019	The Morose Mononokean	The Executive	Season 2 episode 2 only	
2023	Zip Shimezo	Shimezo	ADR director, AM Studio dub	

=== Animation ===
List of voice performances in animation
Year	Title	Role	Notes	Source
2006	Rock 'N Learn series	Bill, Marko the Pencil, others		
2009–10	Starship Farragut: The Animated Episodes	Shealar, Medical Assistant #1	Ep. "The Needs of the Many", "Power Source"	
2009	Star Trek: Enterprise – "Crossroads"	James T. Kirk	English dub of German stop-motion fan film	
2011	The Lion of Judah	Raven 1		
2015–19	RWBY	Qrow Branwen	Volumes 3–6	
2017–18	RWBY Chibi	Qrow Branwen	Season 2-3	
2024	Cosmic Dawn	Old Man		

=== Films ===
List of dubbing performances in direct-to-video, television films and feature films
Year	Title	Role	Notes	Source
2000	Sin: The Movie	Tim Perko		
2003	Dragon Ball Z: Broly – The Legendary Super Saiyan	Broly		
2003	Martian Successor Nadesico: The Motion Picture – Prince of Darkness	Araragi, Hokushin's Six A		
2004	RahXephon: Pluralitas Concentio	Mamoru Torigai		
2005	Saiyuki: Requiem	Kougaiji		
2005	Dragon Ball Z: Broly – Second Coming	Broly		
2005	Dragon Ball Z: Bio-Broly	Broly, Bio Broly		
2006	Fullmetal Alchemist the Movie: Conqueror of Shamballa	Edward Elric		
2007	Air	Yukito Kunisaki		
2008	Bleach: Memories of Nobody	Ikkaku Madarame, Mue		
2009	Bleach: The DiamondDust Rebellion	Ikkaku Madarame		
2009	Naruto: Shippuden the Movie	Yomi, Obito Uchiha		
2011	Bleach: Fade to Black	Ikkaku Madarame		
2012	Pokémon the Movie: Kyurem vs. the Sword of Justice	Keldeo		
2012	Fullmetal Alchemist: The Sacred Star of Milos	Edward Elric		
2012	Sengoku Basara: The Last Party	Tenkai		
2012	Mass Effect: Paragon Lost	Messner	Funimation dub	
2016	Escaflowne	Folken Fanel	Funimation dub	
2016–18	Digimon Adventure tri.	Matt Ishida	Six films	
2017	One Piece Film: Gold	Sabo	Funimation dub	
2018	Deadpool The Musical 2 - Ultimate Disney Parody	Beast / Captain America (voice)	Fan film	
2019	Dragon Ball Super: Broly	Broly	Funimation dub	

=== Video games ===
List of voice performances in video games
Year	Title	Role	Notes	Source
2003	Unlimited Saga	Mythe, Armand	First video game role	
2003–19	Dragon Ball game franchise	Broly, Burter	Only voiced Burter in Tenkaichi Tag Team, Raging Blast 2 and Ultimate Tenkaichi	
2005	Fullmetal Alchemist and the Broken Angel	Edward Elric		
2005	Fullmetal Alchemist 2: Curse of the Crimson Elixir	Edward Elric		
2006	Fullmetal Alchemist: Dual Sympathy	Edward Elric		
2006–09	Bleach series	Ikkaku Madarame	Dark Souls, Shattered Blade and The 3rd Phantom	
2007	Project Sylpheed	Katana Faraway		
2007–18	Persona series	Junpei Iori	(Note: The closing credits or manual does not list the voice actors involved.)	
2008–2015	Disgaea series	Mao, Nemo		
2008	Star Ocean: First Departure	T'nique Arcana		
2009	Kamen Rider: Dragon Knight	Spear		
2009	MagnaCarta 2	Others		
2009–16	Naruto Shippuden: Ultimate Ninja series	Nagato, Young Obito Uchiha, Cee, Madara Uchiha (Imposter)/Tobi		
2010	Sengoku Basara: Samurai Heroes	Tenkai		
2010–17	Sonic the Hedgehog series	E-123 Omega		
2011–13	Mario & Sonic series	E-123 Omega	London 2012 and Sochi 2014	
2012	Divina	Orwell		
2013	Marvel Heroes	Uatu		
2013	Pac-Man and the Ghostly Adventures	Spiral		
2024	7 Days to Die	Trader Hugh		

=== Live action ===
List of live-action appearances
Year	Title	Role	Notes	Source
2003	Holly's Story: A Journey to Freedom and Hope	Jim Hudson		
2011	Fallout: Nuka Break	Merchant/Narrator		
2012–17	Star Trek Continues	Captain Kirk	Developer, writer, director	
2012	Todd of the Rings	Vodo		
2013	Star Trek: New Voyages	Andorian Captain, Klingon Commander Malkthon		
2015	Star Trek: Renegades	Garis		
2016	Fan-O-Rama: A Futurama Fan Film	Zapp Brannigan		
2017	Altered Spirits	Skip	aka Broken Spirits	

=== Documentary ===
List of voice performances in live-action films
Year	Title	Role	Notes	Source
2008	Adventures in Voice Acting	Himself		

== Discography ==
=== Studio albums ===
- If These Walls Could Talk (1992)
- Selah – Music for the Quiet Time (2004–2005)
- Metafiction (2006)
- Christmas (2008)
- Selah II (2009)
- Revix (2010) – a remix album of some of his earlier singles
- The Music of Vic Mignogna (2023)
- Up There Down Here (2024)

=== Audio recordings ===
- Gospel of John
- A Howl at the Moon (2014) – audiobook narrator
- In Plain Sight (2020) – audiobook narrator
- The Crimson Spark, Vagabond Legacy, Book 1 (2020) – audiobook narrator
- These Are the Voyages (2021) – audiobook narrator
- Paper Doll (2022) – audiobook narrator
- The Nova Quadrant (2023) – audiobook narrator
- The Opal Embers, Vagabond Legacy, Book 2 (2024) – audiobook narrator
