= Yama-Con =

Anime convention in Pigeon Forge, Tennessee

Coordinates: 35°47′51.3″N 83°33′43″W

- Status: Active
- Genre: Anime, Japanese culture
- Venue: LeConte Center at Pigeon Forge
- Location: Pigeon Forge, Tennessee
- Country: United States
- Inaugurated: 2012
- Attendance: 2,600 in 2014
- Organizer: MCA Entertainment Group
- Website: http://www.yamacon.org/

Yama-Con is an annual three-day anime convention with multigenre elements held during November/December at the LeConte Center in Pigeon Forge, Tennessee. Yama-Con's name comes from the Japanese word for mountain, "Yama."

== Programming ==
The convention typically offers an Artists' Alley, ball, concerts, costume contests, dances, exhibits, game rooms, gaming tournaments, karaoke, Maid/Butler Cafe, replicas, vendor space, and workshops. The 2015 and 2016 charity auction benefited Pets Without Parents, and in 2015 raised $2,800.

== History ==
The first event at the Smoky Mountain Convention Center in 2012 was held in December due to the month having few other conventions. Yama-Con used hotel rooms for their Video Gaming areas and tents for event space in 2013. Complaints occurred due to the use of tents in the cold and wet weather. The convention moved to the LeConte Center in Pigeon Forge in 2014 due to outgrowing its old space. Yama-Con located its programming for adults 18 and up at the Smoky Mountain Convention Center in 2016. Yama-Con 2020 was cancelled due to the COVID-19 pandemic. The convention had a dress code for 2021.

=== Event history ===
Dates	Location	Atten.	Guests
December 8–9, 2012	Smoky Mountain Convention Center; Pigeon Forge, Tennessee	1,215	Johnny Yong Bosch, Jo Envel, Eyeshine, James "Doodle" Lyle, The Man Power, Hushicho Phoenix, Scott West, Robert Axelrod, Divided We Stand, Larry Mainland, Jim O'Rear, Paul St. Peter, Hushicho Phoenix, Mark Poole, Andy Price, and Sonya Thompson.
December 6–8, 2013	Smoky Mountain Convention Center; Pigeon Forge, Tennessee	1,725	Manda Bear, Bea Billany, Johnny Yong Bosch, Dr3amland, Jo Envel, Eyeshine, Gavin Goszka, James "Doodle" Lyle, Larry Mainland, The Man Power, Mike McFarland, Jim O'Rear, Project: Leviathan, Sean Schemmel, Paul St. Peter, Sonny Strait, Sonya Thompson, Scott West, Greg Wicker, Cosplay Kasterborous, Tom Nguyen, and Jamie Tyndall.
December 5–7, 2014	LeConte Center at Pigeon Forge; Pigeon Forge, Tennessee	2,600	Patricia Alice Albrecht, Linda Ballantyne, Bea Billany, Johnny Yong Bosch, Stephanie Celeste, Chalk Twins, Lucien Dodge, Eyeshine, Katie Griffin, Erik Hodson, Kazha, Laugh Out Loud, James "Doodle" Lyle, Larry Mainland, Shawn McCauley, Erica Mendez, Tom Nguyen, PikaFreakRachel, Toby Proctor, Susan Roman, Stephen J. Semones, Sonya Thompson, Vedetta Marie, Scott West, and Greg Wicker.
December 4–6, 2015	LeConte Center at Pigeon Forge; Pigeon Forge, Tennessee		Johnny Yong Bosch, Chalk Twins, Cosplay, Inc., Eyeshine, Chuck Huber, James "Doodle" Lyle, Shawn McCauley, PikaFreakRachel, Christopher Sabat, Stephen J. Semones, Ian Sinclair, The Slants, Paul St. Peter, Eric Vale, and Scott West.
December 2–4, 2016	LeConte Center at Pigeon Forge; Pigeon Forge, Tennessee		Robert Axelrod, Johnny Yong Bosch, Chalk Twins, Charlet Chung, Eyeshine, Barbara Goodson, Kyle Hebert, James "Doodle" Lyle, Larry Mainland, Professor Shyguy, Stephen J. Semones, Seraphina, Paul St. Peter, Eric Stuart, Sonya Thompson, David Vincent, Vitamin H Productions, and Scott West.
December 1–3, 2017	LeConte Center at Pigeon Forge; Pigeon Forge, Tennessee		Johnny Yong Bosch, Chalk Twins, Leah Clark, Cosplay, Inc., Cynthia Cranz, Eyeshine, Ghostbusters, Aki Glancy, Todd Haberkorn, Haiden Hazard, Chuck Huber, Kazha, James "Doodle" Lyle, Larry Mainland, Shawn McCauley, PikaFreakRachel, Derek Stephen Prince, Professor Shyguy, Stephen J. Semones, Paul St. Peter, Sonya Thompson, Vitamin H Productions, Vocamerica, and Scott West.
November 30 - December 2, 2018	LeConte Center at Pigeon Forge; Pigeon Forge, Tennessee		Johnny Yong Bosch, Cherami Leigh, Larry Mainland, Josh Martin, Vic Mignogna, Bryce Papenbrook, Professor Shyguy, Chris Rager, Paul St. Peter, Tokyo Attack!, and Vitamin H Productions.
December 6–9, 2019	LeConte Center at Pigeon Forge; Pigeon Forge, Tennessee		Morgan Berry, Beau Billingslea, Steve Blum, Johnny Yong Bosch, Caitlin Glass, Wendee Lee, Paul St. Peter, J. Michael Tatum, and Christopher Wehkamp.
December 10–12, 2021	LeConte Center at Pigeon Forge; Pigeon Forge, Tennessee		Johnny Yong Bosch, Mike McFarland, Bryce Papenbrook, John Swasey, Abby Trott, and Mark Whitten.
December 9–11, 2022	LeConte Center at Pigeon Forge; Pigeon Forge, Tennessee		Johnny Yong Bosch, Griffin Burns, Chalk Twins, Kazha, Keith Silverstein, Paul St. Peter, Cristina Vee, Vitamin H Productions, and Linda Young.
December 8–10, 2023	LeConte Center at Pigeon Forge; Pigeon Forge, Tennessee		Zach Aguilar, Johnny Yong Bosch, Chalk Twins, Aaron Dismuke, Erika Harlacher, Kazha, Bryce Papenbrook, Michelle Ruff, Paul St. Peter, and Catherine Sutherland.
December 6–8, 2024	LeConte Center at Pigeon Forge; Pigeon Forge, Tennessee		Bryn Apprill, Johnny Yong Bosch, Dani Chambers, Ricco Fajardo, Todd Haberkorn, Brian Mathis, and Paul St. Peter.
December 5-7, 2025	LeConte Center at Pigeon Forge; Pigeon Forge, Tennessee		Johnny Yong Bosch, Bob Carter, Chalk Twins, Robbie Daymond, Sandy Fox, Lex Lang, Adam McArthur, and Anne Yatco.
December 4-6, 2026	LeConte Center at Pigeon Forge; Pigeon Forge, Tennessee		Ryan Bartley, Bryson Baugus, Johnny Yong Bosch, Clifford Chapin, Jason Douglas, Jessie James Grelle, Kristen McGuire, Trina Nishimura, and Bryce Papenbrook.
