= List of Bleach video games =

The logo of the Bleach series as seen on all of the video game covers

There are several video games based on Tite Kubo's manga and anime series Bleach. The titles consist mostly of side-scrolling fighters, but also include other genres such as strategy role-playing games and action role-playing games. Most of the games retell the plot of the manga, following Ichigo Kurosaki and his friends. Some games, however, have veered from the source material and incorporated original stories and characters. The games have been released on a variety of home and handheld consoles.

The first game to be released based on the Bleach series was Bleach: Heat the Soul, which debuted on March 24, 2005, and the latest releases are Bleach: Soul Resurrección, which was released in North America on August 2, 2011, and Bleach: Bankai Batoru, a social network game which was released in Japan on April 14, 2014. There are 23 games bearing the "Bleach" name, not including the four crossover games—Jump Super Stars, Jump Ultimate Stars, J-Stars Victory VS and Jump Force—which feature characters from numerous other Weekly Shōnen Jump anime and manga series. Most Bleach games have been released only in Japan, though Sega has localized the first Wii game and the first three Nintendo DS games for North America, Australia, and Europe. Reception toward the games has been mixed, ranging from "the best fighter" for Bleach: The Blade of Fate, to "(not) a bad first effort, but the competition is leaving this one in the dust" for Bleach: Shattered Blade.

== Series ==
=== Bleach: Heat the Soul ===
The Bleach: Heat the Soul (Bleach: ヒート・ザ・ソウル) series is a series of fighting games developed by Eighting and published by Sony.

Game	Details
Bleach: Heat the Soul Original release date(s): JP: March 24, 2005	Release years by system: 2005—PlayStation Portable
Bleach: Heat the Soul Original release date(s): JP: March 24, 2005	Notes: Features a versus mode between players. (Note: Online functionality via PlayStation Network was available but it has been terminated.); Released under The Best label on March 2, 2006 in Japan.
Bleach: Heat the Soul 2 Original release date(s): JP: September 1, 2005	Release years by system: 2005—PlayStation Portable
Bleach: Heat the Soul 2 Original release date(s): JP: September 1, 2005	Notes: Features a versus mode between players.; Released under The Best label on November 30, 2006 in Japan.
Bleach: Heat the Soul 3 Original release date(s): JP: July 20, 2006	Release years by system: 2006—PlayStation Portable
Bleach: Heat the Soul 3 Original release date(s): JP: July 20, 2006	Notes: Features a versus mode between players.; Released under The Best label on September 20, 2007 in Japan.
Bleach: Heat the Soul 4 Original release date(s): JP: May 24, 2007	Release years by system: 2007—PlayStation Portable
Bleach: Heat the Soul 4 Original release date(s): JP: May 24, 2007	Notes: Features a versus mode between players.; Released under The Best label on July 3, 2008 in Japan.
Bleach: Heat the Soul 5 Original release date(s): JP: May 15, 2008	Release years by system: 2008—PlayStation Portable
Bleach: Heat the Soul 5 Original release date(s): JP: May 15, 2008	Notes: The game features a versus and cooperative mode between players.; Released under The Best label on July 9, 2009 in Japan.
Bleach: Heat the Soul 6 Original release date(s): JP: May 14, 2009	Release years by system: 2009—PlayStation Portable; 2010—PlayStation Store
Bleach: Heat the Soul 6 Original release date(s): JP: May 14, 2009	Notes: Features a versus and cooperative mode between players.; Available for download from the PlayStation Store.; Contains a playable demo for the game Bleach: Soul Carnival 2.; Released under The Best label on June 3, 2010 in Japan.
Bleach: Heat the Soul 7 Original release date(s): JP: September 2, 2010	Release years by system: 2010—PlayStation Portable; 2013—PlayStation Store
Bleach: Heat the Soul 7 Original release date(s): JP: September 2, 2010	Notes: Features a 4-player battle mode.; Available for download from the PlayStation Store.; Features over 80 playable characters.; Released under The Best label on January 24, 2013 in Japan.

=== Bleach Nintendo Home Consoles ===
The Bleach Nintendo Home Console series is a series of fighting games published by Sega, with the first two being developed by Polygon Magic and Versus Crusade being developed by Treasure Co. Ltd.

Game	Details
Bleach GC: Tasogare ni Mamieru Shinigami Original release date(s): JP: December 8, 2005	Release years by system: 2005—Nintendo GameCube
Bleach GC: Tasogare ni Mamieru Shinigami Original release date(s): JP: December 8, 2005	Notes: Released in Japan as Bleach GC Tasogare ni Mamieru Shinigami (Bleach GC 黄昏にまみえる死神; Bleach GC: Death Gods Meeting in the Twilight).; Includes a 2-player battle mode.
Bleach: Shattered Blade Original release date(s): JP: December 14, 2006; NA: October 9, 2007; AU: February 28, 2008; EU: February 29, 2008	Release years by system: 2006—Wii
Bleach: Shattered Blade Original release date(s): JP: December 14, 2006; NA: October 9, 2007; AU: February 28, 2008; EU: February 29, 2008	Notes: Released in Japan as Bleach Wii Hakujin Kirameku Rondo (Bleach Wii 白刃きらめく輪舞曲; Bleach: Shattered Blade).; Features a 2-player battle mode.
Bleach: Versus Crusade Original release date(s): JP: December 18, 2008	Release years by system: 2008—Wii
Bleach: Versus Crusade Original release date(s): JP: December 18, 2008	Notes: Released in Japan as Bleach Bāsasu Kuruseido (Bleach バーサス・クルセイド; Bleach: Versus Crusade).; Visitors to the official website were allowed to vote for which two characters they wanted on the cover of the game; the winning pair was Ichigo Kurosaki and Rukia Kuchiki.; Features multiplayer systems. (Note: Multiplayer functionality was available before it was discontinued on May 20, 2014.)

=== Bleach DS ===
The Bleach DS series are 2-D games. The first two were fighting games developed by Treasure Co. Ltd. All four were published by Sega.

Game	Details
Bleach: The Blade of Fate Original release date(s): JP: January 26, 2006; NA: October 9, 2007; AU: February 28, 2008; EU: February 29, 2008	Release years by system: 2006—Nintendo DS
Bleach: The Blade of Fate Original release date(s): JP: January 26, 2006; NA: October 9, 2007; AU: February 28, 2008; EU: February 29, 2008	Notes: A fighting video game.; Released in Japan as Bleach DS Sōten ni Kakeru Unmei (Bleach DS 蒼天に駆ける運命; Bleach DS: A Fate Running into the Blue Sky).; Features Nintendo Wi-Fi Connection allowing for multiplayer gameplay.; Released on May 22, 2008, as Bleach DS: Souten ni Kakeru Unmei (Bleach DS 蒼天に駆ける運命お買い得版; Bleach DS: A Fate Running into the Blue Sky (Bargain Edition)).
Bleach: Dark Souls Original release date(s): JP: February 15, 2007; NA: October 7, 2008; AU: March 12, 2009; EU: March 13, 2009	Release years by system: 2007—Nintendo DS
Bleach: Dark Souls Original release date(s): JP: February 15, 2007; NA: October 7, 2008; AU: March 12, 2009; EU: March 13, 2009	Notes: A fighting video game.; Features Nintendo Wi-Fi Connection allowing for multiplayer gameplay.; Released in Japan as Bleach DS 2nd Kokui Hirameku Requiem (Bleach DS 2nd 黒衣ひらめく鎮魂歌; Bleach DS 2nd: The Black-clothed Flickering Requiem).; Released on May 22, 2008 as Bleach DS 2nd Kokui Hirameku Requiem (Bleach DS 2nd 黒衣ひらめく鎮魂歌お買い得版; Bleach DS 2nd: The Black-clothed Flickering Requiem (Bargain Edition)).
Bleach: The 3rd Phantom Original release date(s): JP: June 26, 2008; NA: September 15, 2009; AU: February 11, 2010; EU: February 12, 2010	Release years by system: 2008—Nintendo DS
Bleach: The 3rd Phantom Original release date(s): JP: June 26, 2008; NA: September 15, 2009; AU: February 11, 2010; EU: February 12, 2010	Notes: A strategy RPG game as opposed to the normal fighting games.; Features multiplayer systems.
Bleach DS 4th: Flame Bringer Original release date(s): JP: August 6, 2009	Release years by system: 2009—Nintendo DS
Bleach DS 4th: Flame Bringer Original release date(s): JP: August 6, 2009	Notes: A side-scrolling platform game as opposed to the normal fighting games.; Released in Japan as Bleach DS 4th Fureimu Buringā (Bleach DS 4th：フレイム・ブリンガー; Bleach DS 4th: Flame Bringer).; The game theme song is "Shōjo S" (少女S; "Girls") by Scandal which was used as 10th opening track for anime Bleach.; Famitsu gave a 31 out of 40. The game sold 16,018 copies in Japan in its debut week.

=== Bleach: Blade Battlers ===
The Bleach: Blade Battlers (Bleach〜ブレイド・バトラーズ〜) series is a series of 3-D cel-shaded fighting games developed by Racjin and published by Sony.

Game	Details
Bleach: Blade Battlers Original release date(s): JP: October 12, 2006	Release years by system: 2006—PlayStation 2
Bleach: Blade Battlers Original release date(s): JP: October 12, 2006	Notes: Features 4-player versus mode.; Released under The Best label on October 25, 2007 in Japan.
Bleach: Blade Battlers 2nd Original release date(s): JP: September 27, 2007	Release years by system: 2007—PlayStation 2
Bleach: Blade Battlers 2nd Original release date(s): JP: September 27, 2007	Notes: Features 36 playable characters.; The game features 4-player cooperative and versus modes.

=== Bleach: Soul Carnival ===
The Bleach: Soul Carnival (Bleach: ソゥル・カーニバル) series are 2D action games developed by Racjin and published by Sony.

Game	Details
Bleach: Soul Carnival Original release date(s): JP: October 23, 2008	Release years by system: 2008—PlayStation Portable; 2010—PlayStation Store
Bleach: Soul Carnival Original release date(s): JP: October 23, 2008	Notes: Features chibi character designs.; Released under The Best label on January 14, 2010 in Japan.; Available for download from the PlayStation Store.
Bleach: Soul Carnival 2 Original release date(s): JP: December 10, 2009	Release years by system: 2009—PlayStation Portable, PlayStation Store
Bleach: Soul Carnival 2 Original release date(s): JP: December 10, 2009	Notes: Features over 120 characters.; Available for download from the PlayStation Store.

== Individual games ==
Game	Details
Bleach Advance: Kurenai ni Somaru Soul Society Original release date(s): JP: July 21, 2005	Release years by system: 2005—Game Boy Advance
Bleach Advance: Kurenai ni Somaru Soul Society Original release date(s): JP: July 21, 2005	Notes: An action video game.; Developed and published by Sega.; Features versus mode via the use of a link cable.
Bleach: Erabareshi Tamashii Original release date(s): JP: August 4, 2005	Release years by system: 2005—PlayStation 2
Bleach: Erabareshi Tamashii Original release date(s): JP: August 4, 2005	Notes: An action based video game.; Developed by Aspect Co. and published by SCEI.; Released under The Best label on October 25, 2007 in Japan.
Bleach: Hanatareshi Yabou Original release date(s): JP: February 16, 2006	Release years by system: 2006—PlayStation 2
Bleach: Hanatareshi Yabou Original release date(s): JP: February 16, 2006	Notes: A role-playing video game.; Developed and published by Sony Computer Entertainment.; Released under The Best label on October 25, 2007 in Japan.
Bleach: Soul Resurrección Original release date(s): JP: June 23, 2011; NA: August 2, 2011; EU: September 16, 2011; AU: September 22, 2011	Release years by system: 2011—PlayStation 3
Bleach: Soul Resurrección Original release date(s): JP: June 23, 2011; NA: August 2, 2011; EU: September 16, 2011; AU: September 22, 2011	Notes: An action video game.; Developed by Japan Studio and Racjin, and published by SCEI (Japan) & NIS America.; Released in Japan as Bleach: Soul Ignition.; The initial release came with three downloadable anime episodes of Bleach (episodes 190–192) from PlayStation Network.; Released under The Best label on January 24, 2013 in Japan.
Bleach: Bankai Batoru Original release date(s): JP: April 14, 2014	Release years by system: 2014—iOS, Android
Bleach: Bankai Batoru Original release date(s): JP: April 14, 2014	Notes: A social network based video game.; Developed by ORATTA and published by GREE.; The game closed on October 9, 2019.
Bleach: Brave Souls Original release date(s): JP: July 23, 2015; NA: January 13, 2016	Release years by system: 2015—iOS, Android; 2020—Windows; 2022—PlayStation 4; 2024—Xbox One, Nintendo Switch
Bleach: Brave Souls Original release date(s): JP: July 23, 2015; NA: January 13, 2016	Notes: An action based video game.; Developed and published by KLab Games.
Bleach: Paradise Lost Original release date(s): JP: September 29, 2017	Release years by system: 2017—iOS, Android
Bleach: Paradise Lost Original release date(s): JP: September 29, 2017	Notes: A location and action based video game.; Developed and published by Line.; The game closed on December 4, 2018.
Bleach: Soul Rising Original release date(s): CHN: November 15, 2018; JP: September 17, 2020	Release years by system: 2018—iOS, Android
Bleach: Soul Rising Original release date(s): CHN: November 15, 2018; JP: September 17, 2020	Notes: A location and action based video game.; Developed and published by KLab Games.; First released in mainland China in 2018 under the name Bleach Kyo・Kai-Tamashinokakusei：Shinigami.
Bleach: Immortal Soul Original release date(s): WW: March 2020	Release years by system: 2020—iOS, Android
Bleach: Immortal Soul Original release date(s): WW: March 2020	Notes: A location and action based video game.; Developed and published by OasisGames.
Bleach Soul Puzzle Original release date(s): WW: September 24, 2024	Release years by system: 2024—iOS, Android
Bleach Soul Puzzle Original release date(s): WW: September 24, 2024	Notes: A puzzle video game.; Developed and published by KLab Games.; The game closed on April 14, 2026.
Bleach: Rebirth of Souls Original release date(s): WW: March 21, 2025	Release years by system: 2025—Windows, PlayStation 4, PlayStation 5, Xbox Series X/S
Bleach: Rebirth of Souls Original release date(s): WW: March 21, 2025	Notes: An 3D fighting video game.; Developed by Tamsoft and published by Bandai Namco Entertainment.

=== Other games ===
Game	Details
Jump Super Stars Original release date(s): JP: August 8, 2005	Release years by system: 2005—Nintendo DS
Jump Super Stars Original release date(s): JP: August 8, 2005	Notes: A fighting video game.; Developed by Nintendo and Ganbarion, and published by Nintendo.; The game features one stage, one playable character, and five support characters from the Bleach series.
Jump Ultimate Stars Original release date(s): JP: November 23, 2006	Release years by system: 2006—Nintendo DS
Jump Ultimate Stars Original release date(s): JP: November 23, 2006	Notes: A fighting video game.; Developed by Nintendo and Ganbarion, and published by Nintendo.; The game features one stage, four playable characters, and thirteen support characters from the Bleach series.
J-Stars Victory VS Original release date(s): JP: March 19, 2014	Release years by system: 2014—PlayStation 3, PlayStation Vita
J-Stars Victory VS Original release date(s): JP: March 19, 2014	Notes: A fighting video game.; Developed by Spike Chunsoft and published by Bandai Namco Games.; The game features one stage, two playable characters, and one support character from the Bleach series.
Jump Force Original release date(s): JP: February 14, 2019; WW: February 15, 2019	Release years by system: 2019—PlayStation 4, Xbox One, Steam
Jump Force Original release date(s): JP: February 14, 2019; WW: February 15, 2019	Notes: A fighting video game.; Developed by Spike Chunsoft and published by Bandai Namco Games.; The game features four playable characters from the Bleach series with three additional characters added later as downloadable content.
