= Death grip (disambiguation) =

A death grip is an extremely tight grip, such as that exerted by a person in a panic.

Death Grip may also refer to:

- Death-grip syndrome, alleged cause of sexual dysfunction
- Death Grip (film), a 2012 film
- Death Grips, an experimental hip hop band from Sacramento, California
  - Death Grips (EP), the eponymous EP by the group
- Deathgrip (album), a 2016 metalcore album by Fit for a King

== See also ==
- Vulcan death grip, a fictional technique featured in the Star Trek franchise
