= Synduality =

Japanese mixed-media project

- Project logo
- Created by: Magus
- Anime television series

Synduality: Noir
- Directed by: Yusuke Yamamoto
- Written by: Hajime Kamoshida; Takashi Aoshima
- Music by: Masato Nakayama
- Studio: Eight Bit
- Licensed by: Disney Platform Distribution
- Original network: TXN (TV Tokyo), BS Nittele, AT-X
- Original run: July 11, 2023 – March 26, 2024
- Episodes: 24
- Serial novel

Synduality: Kaleido
- Written by: Dai Hatano
- Published by: Hobby Japan
- Magazine: Monthly Hobby Japan
- Original run: July 25, 2023 – April 25, 2024
- Volumes: 7
- Manga

Synduality: Ellie
- Written by: Masaru Hatano
- Illustrated by: Hiroji Mishima
- Published by: Media Factory
- Magazine: Monthly Comic Alive
- Original run: July 27, 2023 – October 25, 2024
- Volumes: 2
- Light novel

Synduality: Ellie
- Written by: Masaru Hatano
- Illustrated by: Yō Midorikawa
- Published by: Media Factory
- Imprint: MF Bunko J
- Published: September 25, 2023
- Light novel

Hajimari no Ao Synduality: Roots
- Written by: Yūya Takashima
- Illustrated by: neco
- Published by: Tokyo Sogensha
- Imprint: Sogen SF Bunko
- Published: March 15, 2024
- Related media
- Synduality: Echo of Ada (video game)
- icon

Synduality (stylized in all caps) is a Japanese mixed-media project created by the Bandai Namco Group. An anime television series produced by Eight Bit, titled Synduality: Noir, aired from July 2023 to March 2024.

== Plot ==
On the night of the new moon in 2099, the "blue rain" fell heavily over a wide area, mainly in the Mediterranean Sea, and the resulting flooding around the world resulted in the loss of more than 92% of the world's population within a few days. This series of catastrophes was later called the "Tears of the New Moon", and the blue rain, which continued to fall intermittently afterwards, was found to have the effect of instantly killing anyone who touched it, while also making other animals and plants gigantic and aggressive. The giant creatures that were created as a result came to be called "Enders".

The surviving humans were forced to take refuge in underground facilities, but eventually they developed a bipedal weapon called the "Cradle" as a countermeasure against the Enders, and discovered a new energy resource called the "AO Crystal". As a result, they succeeded in building a huge underground city called "Amasia" with a huge canopy that could completely block the rain and declared the founding of the country in 2135. Under the strictly controlled AO energy society, humanity had finally found a new place to live, but some chose to remain on the surface and live a free life in exchange for the danger. Also, android-related technology developed rapidly in Amasia after this, and in 2210, the first batch of cradles, "Cradle Coffins," was completed, equipped with a new type of android with human-like emotions, "Human Duality Thinking AI-Equipped Humanoid (commonly known as Magus)," and its cockpit, "Coffin."

However, in 2222, 123 years after the "Tears of the New Moon," a disaster occurred in which the roof of Amasia and the city infrastructure suddenly collapsed overnight. The upper levels of Amasia were virtually wiped out, and the survivors began living in small underground cities called "Nests" or on the surface. Furthermore, the collapse of Amasia resulted in the leakage of a large amount of materials and technology, which made it easier for ordinary people to obtain Cradles and Cradle Coffins, which had previously been strictly controlled, and ushered in an era in which anyone could become a "Drifter" who fought the Enders while collecting AO Crystals, in the hopes of making a fortune.

== Characters ==
=== Synduality: Noir ===
Kanata (カナタ)
Voiced by: Takeo Ōtsuka, Mayu Mineda (young) (Japanese); Calvin Joyal, Brittany Cox (young) (English)
Initially a Magusless Drifter, he was taking under the wing of Tokio, which impaled his performance severely. He dreams to get to Histoire, a mythical place that only occurs as a story and laughed by everyone who hears it. He simply continues his parents' wish to get to it. He has human father, a drifter, and female Magus as adoptive mother, which explains why he treat Noir as family. His Cradle Coffin is DAISYOGRE.
Noir (ノワール, Nowāru) / Mystere (ミステル, Misuteru)
Voiced by: Aoi Koga (Japanese); Erin Yvette (English)
A Type Zero Magus discovered on stasis by Kanata during his errand on a ruin. Everyone thinks Noir lost her memory as she said she cannot remember anything, so Kanata does his best effort to help her. In reality, Mystere received Noir's appearance and personality after she hacked into the Histoire network with her previous master, Pascal. As a result, Noir and Mystere occupy the same body. Mystere's Magus skill is different and more powerful.
Ciel (シエル, Shieru)
Voiced by: Nagisa Aoyama (Japanese); Frankie Kevich (English)
A seemingly masterless Magus who works as a freelance singer from one nest to another until she meets Kanata. In reality, she is a spy working to find the "key to Histoire", so she gets close to Kanata to observe Noir. Her view changes because Kanata does not treat her as a tool, and he likes her singing and wants to help her achieve her dream as a singer. Her Magus skill is an echoing song that affects every Magus that hears it, rendering them and the Coffin static. She has been formatted several times.
Tokio (トキオ) / Licht Alter (リヒト・アルター, Rihito Arutā)
Voiced by: Yūsuke Kobayashi (Japanese); Aaron Dismuke (English)
Kanata's boss who is a skilled Drifter. He was actually born in Amasia from the same gene as Macht and Weisheit. His Cradle Coffin is JOHNGASMAKER.
Mouton (ムートン, Mūton)
Voiced by: Fuminori Komatsu (Japanese); Christopher Swindle (English)
Tokio's Magus who acts like his personal butler. Secretly, he is a Type Zero Magus with the skill "Overclock", which enables him to analyze everything at very fast pace.
Ellie (エリー, Erī)
Voiced by: Konomi Inagaki (Japanese); Merit Leighton (English)
Childhood friend of Kanata who has crush towards him. Her Cradle Coffin is LEAHLID.
Ange (アンジェ, Anje)
Voiced by: Ayaka Ōhashi (Japanese); Abbey Veffer (English)
Ellie's Magus who acts like her friend. She always gives Ellie advice on how she should be honest to Kanata about her feelings.
Michael (マイケル, Maikeru)
Voiced by: Daisuke Sakaguchi (Japanese); Benjamin Diskin (English)
The leader of Adventure drifters team who is Ellie's boss. Seemingly a spoiled rich kid, he is actually kindhearted towards his team and the people of the Rocktown Nest.
Bob (ボブ, Bobu)
Voiced by: Daiki Hamano (Japanese); Gogo Lomo-David (English)
Michael's Magus who acts like his bodyguard. He is actually one of five identical Magi develop by Michael's family, the others are Boba, Bobi, Bobo, and Bobe.
Maria (マリア)
Voiced by: Miku Itō (Japanese); Stephanie Sheh (English)
A skilled engineer of Rocktown Nest who is Ellie's older sister. She has multiple identical Magi that helps her work, even though she is not a drifter.
Schnee (シュネー, Shunē)
Voiced by: M.A.O (Japanese); Melissa Hope (English)
Macht's Magus who has ice skill.
Kurokamen (黒仮面) / Macht Ewigkeit (マハト・エーヴィヒカイト, Mahato Ēvihikaito)
Voiced by: Taito Ban (Japanese); Ryan Colt Levy (English)
A member of Ideal under the Weisheit leadership. His Cradle Coffin is GILBOW.
Claudia (クラウディア, Kuraudia)
Voiced by: Ryoka Yuzuki (Japanese); Allegra Clark (English)
A renegade Drifter who is skillful. She tricks Kanata twice even though he does not hate her and later join his cause. Her Cradle Coffin is GLENSHINOBI.
Flamme (フラム, Furamu)
Voiced by: Marika Kōno (Japanese); Christina Assaf-Costello (English)
Claudia's Magus who has a fire skill. A Type Zero, she is the one that gives Kanata's Cradle Coffin the name after their first encounter.
Weisheit Blaurecht (ヴァイスハイト・ブラウレヒト, Vaisuhaito Buraurehito)
Voiced by: Yuki Kaji (Japanese); Michael Sinterniklaas (English)
Leader of Ideal, he treats Magus as a tool and believe Magi will eventually betray humanity. His Cradle Coffin is NOAHGAMECHANGER, and does not seem to operate with the help of Magus.

=== Echo of Ada ===
Ada (エイダ, Eida)
Voiced by: Yui Ishikawa (Japanese); Madeline Dorroh (English)
Alba Kuze (アルバ・クゼ, Aruba Kuze)
Voiced by: Yūya Hirose (Japanese); Johnny Yong Bosch (English)
Yoshio (ヨシヲ, Yoshiwo)
Voiced by: Zundamon

== Media ==
=== Synduality: Noir ===
An anime television series, produced by Eight Bit, was announced in September 2022. Titled Synduality: Noir, the series was directed by Yusuke Yamamoto, with Takashi Aoshima writing the scripts based on a story draft by Hajime Kamoshida, Kenichirō Katsura designing the characters for animation, and Masato Nakayama composing the music.

The first half of the series aired from July 11 to September 26, 2023, on TV Tokyo and its affiliates, as well as BS Nittele. (Note: TV Tokyo listed the series premiere on July 10, 2023 at 24:00, which is effectively July 11 at midnight JST.) The first opening theme song is "Raytracer", performed by Stereo Dive Foundation, while the first ending theme song is "Eureka" (ユリイカ), performed by Arcana Project.

On September 24, 2023, a second cour was announced during the "Synduality Project TGS Special Stage" event at Tokyo Game Show 2023, which aired from January 9 to March 26, 2024. (Note: TV Tokyo listed the second cour's premiere on January 8, 2024 at 24:00, which is effectively January 9 at midnight JST.) The second opening theme song is "Aire" (アイレ), performed by Arcana Project, while the second ending theme song is "Drifters", performed by Stereo Dive Foundation.

The series is streaming worldwide on Disney+, in Latin America on Star+ and in the United States on Hulu.

==== Episodes ====
No.	Title	Directed by (Note: Information is taken from the ending credits of each episode.)	Written by	Storyboarded by	Original release date
Part 1
1	"My name is..."	Sho Kitamura	Hajime Kamoshida	Yusuke Yamamoto	July 11, 2023
2	"My master"	Munenori Nawa	Hajime Kamoshida	Katsumi Terahigashi	July 18, 2023
3	"Behind the mask"	Seung-hui Son	Takashi Aoshima	Katsumi Terahigashi	July 25, 2023
4	"Wild daisy"	Shinpei Ezaki	Takashi Aoshima	Shinpei Ezaki	August 1, 2023
5	"Drifting the maze"	Munenori Nawa	Deko Akao	Tatsuya Igarashi	August 8, 2023
6	"Dice is cast"	Tsutomu Murakami	Masahiro Yokotani	Futoshi Fujikawa	August 15, 2023
7	"My dear..."	Atsushi Nakayama	Takashi Aoshima	Katsumi Terahigashi & Yūji Haibara	August 22, 2023
8	"Pure dream"	Susumu Tosaka	Deko Akao	Hiroaki Shimura & Yūji Haibara (Note: Ciel's live scene only.)	August 29, 2023
9	"Legendary hero"	Masahiko Suzuki	Masaru Hatano	Katsumi Terahigashi	September 5, 2023
10	"Drifter's pride"	Takayuki Tanaka	Takashi Aoshima	Katsumi Terahigashi	September 12, 2023
11	"Storm of A.I."	Sho Kitamura	Takashi Aoshima	Yusuke Yamamoto	September 19, 2023
12	"Mirage of the Ideal"	Masahiko Suzuki & Miho Arai	Takashi Aoshima	Katsumi Terahigashi	September 26, 2023
Part 2
13	"Double cast"	Naokatsu Tsuda	Takashi Aoshima	Naokatsu Tsuda	January 9, 2024
14	"Mysterious journey"	Yūki Nakano	Masaru Hatano	Hiroaki Shimura	January 16, 2024
15	"Duel of Fates"	Kentarō Sugimoto	Hiroshi Yamaguchi	Shunichi Yoshizawa	January 23, 2024
16	"Noir Rain"	Sho Kitamura	Takashi Aoshima	Sho Kitamura	January 30, 2024
17	"Greyish zone"	Naoki Kusumoto	Hajime Kamoshida	Masao Shimizu	February 6, 2024
18	"Beyond the sky"	Yūsuke Yamamoto & Sho Kitamura	Hajime Kamoshida	Yūsuke Yamamoto	February 13, 2024
19	"Body double"	Munenori Nawa	Takashi Aoshima	Chihiro Nitta	February 20, 2024
20	"Their narratives"	Takayuki Tanaka	Yūya Takashima	Hidekazu Sato	February 27, 2024
21	"Your song"	Masahiko Suzuki	Hiroshi Yamaguchi	Nejiko Shimura	March 5, 2024
22	"Gravity coffin"	Yūsuke Yamamoto	Hiroshi Yamaguchi	Shunichi Yoshizawa	March 12, 2024 (Note: This episode aired at 12:10 a.m. JST, 10 minutes after the original air time on TV Tokyo.)
23	"Over the limit"	Tatsuya Igarashi	Takashi Aoshima	Susumu Nishizawa & Masao Shimizu	March 19, 2024 (Note: This episode aired at 12:30 a.m. JST, 30 minutes after the original air time on TV Tokyo.)
24	"My name is... Noir" "Drifters again"	Sho Kitamura	Takashi Aoshima	Yūsuke Yamamoto & Nejiko Shimura	March 26, 2024

=== Synduality: Kaleido ===
A spin-off novel titled Synduality: Kaleido by Dai Hatano was serialized in Hobby Japan's Monthly Hobby Japan from July 25, 2023, to April 25, 2024.

=== Synduality: Ellie ===
==== Manga ====
A manga series, illustrated by Hiroji Mishima with a screenplay by Masaru Hatano, titled Synduality: Ellie was serialized in Media Factory's Monthly Comic Alive from July 27, 2023, to October 25, 2024.

No.	Japanese release date	Japanese ISBN
1	February 28, 2024	978-4-04-811265-9
2	January 28, 2025	978-4-04-811311-3

==== Light novel ====
A light novel also titled Synduality: Ellie, written by Hatano and illustrated by Yō Midorikawa, was published by Media Factory's MF Bunko J imprint on September 25, 2023.

No.	Japanese release date	Japanese ISBN
1	September 25, 2023	978-4-04-682861-3

=== Hajimari no Ao Synduality: Roots ===
A second light novel titled Hajimari no Ao Synduality: Roots, written by Yūya Takashima and illustrated by neco, was published by Tokyo Sogensha's Sogen SF Bunko imprint on March 15, 2024.

No.	Japanese release date	Japanese ISBN
1	March 15, 2024	978-4-488-78503-1

=== Synduality: Echo of Ada ===
A third-person shooter and action RPG developed by Game Studio and published by Bandai Namco Entertainment, titled Synduality: Echo of Ada, was released for Microsoft Windows, PlayStation 5 and Xbox Series X/S on January 23, 2025.
