= These Are the Voyages (book series) =

- These Are the Voyages: TOS, Season One; These Are the Voyages: TOS, Season Two; These Are the Voyages: TOS, Season Three; These Are the Voyages: Gene Roddenberry and Star Trek in the 1970s, Volume 1 (1970-1975); These Are the Voyages: Gene Roddenberry and Star Trek in the 1970s, Volume 2 (1975-1977); These Are the Voyages: Gene Roddenberry and Star Trek in the 1970s, Volume 3 (1978-1980)
- Author: Marc Cushman
- Country: United States
- Language: English
- Genre: Nonfiction
- Publisher: Jacobs Brown Press
- Media type: Print
- No. of books: 6
- Website: Official website

These Are the Voyages is a six-volume non-fiction reference book series by Marc Cushman with Susan Osborn about Star Trek: The Original Series and the subsequent movies/television in the 1970s, published by Jacobs Brown Press. The information revealed inside primarily comes from production documents that were donated by Star Trek creator/producer Gene Roddenberry and show co-producer Robert H. Justman to the UCLA Film and Television Archive.

There is one book for each of the three seasons of Star Trek: TOS. The first book documenting the first season of the show, These Are the Voyages: TOS, Season One was published in 2013. These Are the Voyages: TOS, Season Two was published in 2013 and These Are the Voyages: TOS, Season Three in 2015.

In 2019, the next volume, These Are the Voyages: Gene Roddenberry and Star Trek in the 1970s, Volume 1 (1970-1975), was published. The subsequent volumes, These Are the Voyages: Gene Roddenberry and Star Trek in the 1970s, Volume 2 (1975-1977) and These Are the Voyages: Gene Roddenberry and Star Trek in the 1970s, Volume 3 (1978-1980) were released together in 2020.

In 2021, These Are the Voyages: TOS, Season One was turned into an audiobook, narrated by Vic Mignogna, it features a guest of over 100 voice actors chronicling the creation of Star Trek.

== Contents ==
Originally, These Are the Voyages: The Original Series was to be published as one book, but with over 2,000 pages of material, it was decided to break it into three books, one book for each season.

=== TOS, Season One ===
These Are the Voyages: TOS, Season One
- Front Cover
- Author: Marc Cushman
- Language: English
- Subject: Star Trek
- Published: 2013 (Jacobs Brown Press)
- Publication place: United States
- Pages: 580
- ISBN: 978-0-9892-3811-3

The first book documents hundreds of previously unpublished insights, including recollections from actors, directors, producers, and production crew. The book collects original staff memos (including memos dictated by Roddenberry while reading drafts to the series scripts), contracts, schedules, budgets, network correspondence, and the censor reports from NBC. Also included in this first book is the history of what was involved in getting the series accepted by NBC, the failed first pilot, and the ultimatums surrounding the second pilot.

=== TOS, Season Two ===
These Are the Voyages: TOS, Season Two
- Front Cover
- Author: Marc Cushman
- Language: English
- Subject: Star Trek
- Published: 2014 (Jacobs Brown Press)
- Publication place: United States
- Pages: 688
- ISBN: 978-0-9892-3814-4

As in the first book, this second book documents hundreds of previously unpublished insights, including recollections from actors, directors, producers, and production crew. The book collects original staff memos (including memos dictated by Roddenberry while reading drafts to the series scripts), contracts, schedules, budgets, network correspondence, and the censor reports from NBC. Also included in this second book are excerpts of fan mail and many other indications that Star Trek had become a huge success despite the series uncertain future. There are also details of Bjo Trimble's letter writing campaign to save Star Trek from cancellation, and the tens of thousands letters that arrived at NBC as a result.

=== TOS, Season Three ===
These Are the Voyages: TOS, Season Three
- Author: Marc Cushman
- Language: English
- Subject: Star Trek
- Published: 2015 (Jacobs Brown Press)
- Publication place: United States
- Pages: 754
- ISBN: 978-0989238175

The third book basically uses the same format as the previous two, documenting hundreds of previously unpublished insights about the show's third season, as well as collecting original staff memos, contracts, schedules, budgets, network correspondence, and the censor reports from NBC. Also included are NBC's decision to move the show to the 10:00 pm Friday night "death slot", Roddenberry reducing his direct involvement and being replaced by Fred Freiberger as the producer, the budget cuts that significant reduced the quality of the show, and what ultimately became a futile fan campaign to save Star Trek again from cancellation.

=== Gene Roddenberry and Star Trek in the 1970s, Volume 1 (1970-1975) ===
Following the similar formats of TOS books, Volume One of Gene Roddenberry in the 1970s covers Gene Roddenberry and Star Trek rebounding from the series’ cancellation. Roddenberry busied himself in a flurry of projects, including Star Trek: The Animated Series with D.C. Fontana as his associate producer.

=== Gene Roddenberry and Star Trek in the 1970s, Volume 2 (1975-1977) ===
This second volume covers Roddenberry’s career after the end of Star Trek: The Animated Series and his struggles to become known for other achievements. During the mid-1970s, Paramount Studios continued to reap millions from Star Trek licensing, while telling Roddenberry there were no profits to share. As the fandom grew, Paramount finally acknowledged the enduring impact of the series, leading to the development of Star Trek - The Motion Picture.

=== Gene Roddenberry and Star Trek in the 1970s, Volume 3 (1978-1980) ===
The third volume dives deep into the making, the release, and the reception of Star Trek - The Motion Picture, covering topics from merchandising to script development to Jerry Goldsmith's epochal music score.

== History ==
In 1982, Marc Cushman interviewed Gene Roddenberry for a TV special about Star Trek. Later in 1989, he pitched the story for the episode "Sarek," for Star Trek: The Next Generation. Roddenberry gave Cushman all the scripts from the original series and showed him the immense amount of documents he had saved. He invited Cushman to take his previous research for the TV special, expand on it by utilizing the UCLA Archives, and turn it into a book. Cushman was too busy with his own career as a screenwriter and director to begin work on the book until after Roddenberry had died, but during those years, he continued to collect interviews from the creative staff (Justman, D.C. Fontana, John D. F. Black), members of the production crew, the cast, and guest players. In 2007, he began writing the book.

== Reception ==
At the 40th Saturn Awards, Cushman received a Special Recognition Award for his work on the book series. Chris Gardner of Stuff.co.nz rated it 4/5 stars and called it "a compelling read for the Star Trek aficionado as well as anyone interested in television history." Wesley Britton of Blogcritics quoted Rod Roddenberry's statement that "these are the new essential Star Trek reference books."
