= Broken Path =

- Broken Path Poster
- Directed by: Koichi Sakamoto
- Written by: Michael Cooney
- Produced by: Shlomo May-Zur
- Starring: Johnny Yong Bosch; Daniel Southworth; Pamela Walworth; Tadahiro Nakamura
- Cinematography: Clint Childers
- Edited by: Jochen Fitzherbert
- Music by: Cody Westheimer
- Release date: May 3, 2008
- Running time: 90 minutes
- Country: United States
- Language: English

Broken Path, also known as Broken Fist and Attack of the Yakuza, is a martial arts action film starring Johnny Yong Bosch and Daniel Southworth. The film is directed by Koichi Sakamoto and co-produced by Will Raee. It featured stuntwork by Alpha Stunts, which Sakamoto co-founded and worked with on the Power Rangers franchise. Mill Creek Entertainment released the film on DVD.

== Synopsis ==
On an isolated ranch in the desert, one man must protect his wife from a secret past that he is now forced to confront. With the sun towering in the sky overhead, the ranch sits beneath the vast blue, isolated amidst the arid terrain. Though life is certainly evident as a house warming party ensues. Still under renovation, scaffolding and tools are strewn across the ranch, while benches and tables are set up for the food and beverages. The neighbors chat amongst themselves as the hosts - Jack (Johnny Yong Bosch) and Lisa (Pamela Walworth) - hustle about to keep them entertained. As the evening creeps over the scene, the crowd disperses, and Maddy - the couple's daughter - prepares to leave for her first summer camp. By nightfall, they find themselves alone, the guests gone, Maddy on her way on the road, and the ranch left once again in the quiet. As Jack and Lisa prepare themselves for a summer of settling and renovating, they soon find themselves swept up into a storm of confusion and terror, as a group of ruthless, masked strangers descend upon their home. With the vicious group attacking relentlessly, Lisa watches as her husband reveals an impressive ability to defend and counteract the attack. As they are chased within their own home, struggling to survive, Lisa begins to question her husband, his past, his knowledge and his familiarity with one of their assailants who claims he wants to help them. With their hopeful new life quickly crumbling before their very eyes, the two must not only fight to survive, but also fight to save their own relationship and trust in one another in a whirlwind of action and chaos that stems from Jack's hidden past.

== Cast ==
- Johnny Yong Bosch: Jack Ellis/Hiroki
- Daniel Southworth: Yoshi
- Pamela Walworth: Lisa Ellis
- Jodie Moore: Father
- Motoko Nagino: Sakura
- Tadahiro Nakamura: Yukio
- Panuvat Anthony Nanakornpanom: Haru
- Cheryl Toma Sanders: Mother
- Sonny Sison: Jiro
- Lanie Taylor: Maddy
