= Death Grip (film) =

2012 film

Death Grip is a 2012 film by Eric Jacobus starring members of The Stunt People and Johnny Yong Bosch.

== Plot ==
After 15 years of estrangement, caterer Kenny Zemacus checks his idiot savant brother Mark out of a care home, promising to provide him with a better home. Assigned a last minute museum catering gig, Kenny reluctantly brings Mark along, who is immediately captivated by the museum's showpiece - the world-renowned Sacred Coin of Judas. While cleaning up after the event, an elaborate heist unfolds around them to steal the Coin, and Mark's childlike fascination unwittingly entangles the two brothers in the middle, pinning them with the crime.

Worried that contacting the authorities will result in social services permanently repossessing Mark, the two brothers must recover the Coin themselves to clear their names. When Mark is captured, Kenny must descend into the dark world of a murderous satanic cult to save his brother from their clutches and from the mysterious allure of the Coin itself. But both brothers are about the discover the true depths of the hell they must face to reach each other, and just how deadly the Coin's grasp can be.

== Cast ==
- Eric Jacobus as Kenny Zemacus
- Nathan Hoskins as Mark Zemacus
- Johnny Yong Bosch as Torch
- Rebecca Ahn as Rindy

== Release ==
Death Grip was produced and released on July 1, 2012 on DVD.

== Reception ==
Death Grip has already had coverage in several online publications, including Martial Arts Movie Junkie who claim "you can quickly tell that this movie will not be like anything else that is out there and these guys are just getting started.” Kung Fu Cinema added that Death Grip "looks to be ramping up production values while maintaining the same great fight work that made CONTOUR a cult hit within the martial arts movie fandom community.”
