= Synduality: Echo of Ada =

2025 video game

- Developer: Game Studio
- Publisher: Bandai Namco Entertainment
- Director: Yohei Kataoka
- Producer: Yosuke Futami
- Series: Synduality
- Engine: Unreal Engine 5
- Platforms: PlayStation 5; Windows; Xbox Series X/S
- Release: January 23, 2025
- Genres: Action role-playing, third-person shooter
- Modes: Single-player, multiplayer

Synduality: Echo of Ada (Note: Japanese: シンデュアリティ エコー オブ エイダ) is a 2025 third-person shooter video game developed by Game Studio and published by Bandai Namco Entertainment. It is a part of Bandai Namco Holdings' mixed-media project Synduality. It was released for PlayStation 5, Windows and Xbox Series X/S in January 2025.

Players control the Drifters, freelancers who collect a rare resource known as AO Crystals. The game received mixed reviews from critics.

== Plot ==
In 2222, the world is in a post-apocalyptic state after a poisonous rain called the Tears of the New Moon wiped out most of humanity and spawned vicious creatures known as the Enders. The last remaining dregs of society are forced to move into an underground haven. The Drifters, mech-piloting freelancers, earn their keep by collecting a rare resource called AO Crystals, necessary for humanity to survive, while being accompanied by their android guide Magus.

== Development and release ==
The game was first announced as Synduality at PlayStation's State of Play on September 14, 2022. It was planned to be released in 2023. The game's subtitle, Echo of Ada, was revealed at AnimeJapan in March 2023. An anime series, Synduality: Noir, was announced with the game and premiered on July 11, 2023. The anime series chronologically takes place 20 years after the events depicted in Echo of Ada.

Echo of Ada was released on January 23, 2025 for PlayStation 5, Xbox Series X/S, and Windows via Steam. The game's first major update, titled Season 1, was released on February 6, 2025, adding a new map East Amasia, craftable items, and various rewards. Season 2, titled Punishing Lands, was launched on May 23, 2025. Season 3, titled Ender Busters, was launched on October 16, 2025. Season 4, titled "Crossroads," was launched on March 19, 2026. Season 5, titled "Drifters," was launched on July 7, 2026.

On September 26, 2026, Bandai Namco Entertainment announced Echo of Ada would be taken offline in May 2027, where it would be transformed into an offline game.

== Reception ==
Reception

Aggregate scores
Aggregator	Score
Metacritic	(PC) 60/100 (PS5) 65/100 (XSXS) 70/100
OpenCritic	20% recommend

Review scores
Publication	Score
Famitsu	29/40
IGN	7/10
PC Gamer (US)	58/100
Shacknews	7/10

Synduality: Echo of Ada received "mixed or average" reviews from critics according to review aggregator website Metacritic. 20% of critics recommended the game according to OpenCritic. In Japan, four critics from Famitsu gave the game a total score of 29 out of 40.
