= Bleach: The Blade of Fate =

2006 video game

- North American box art
- Developer: Treasure
- Publisher: Sega
- Director: Yuki Mibu
- Programmers: Katsuhiro Sanjo; Hiroto Matsuura; Yuki Mibu
- Artists: Naoki Kitagawa; Satoshi Tetsuka; Tomoharu Saitō
- Writers: Tetsuyoshi Kaneko; Yuki Mibu
- Composer: Norio Hanzawa
- Platform: Nintendo DS
- Release: JP: January 26, 2006; NA: October 9, 2007; AU: February 28, 2008; EU: February 29, 2008
- Genre: Fighting
- Modes: Single-player, multiplayer

Bleach: The Blade of Fate (Note: Known in Japan as Bleach DS Sōten ni Kakeru Unmei (Japanese: BLEACH DS 蒼天に駆ける運命; lit. Bleach DS: A Fate Running into the Blue Sky).) is a fighting game developed by Treasure and published by Sega for the Nintendo DS. It is the first Bleach game to be released for the console. The game featured Wi-Fi Connection, allowing players to connect and play against players all over the world. The game's theme song is "Ichirin no Hana" by High and Mighty Color. It was followed by a sequel, Bleach: Dark Souls.

== Plot ==
Bleach: The Blade of Fate follows Ichigo Kurosaki on his quest to save a Soul Reaper named Rukia Kuchiki, who is scheduled for execution for giving Ichigo her Soul Reaper powers so he could save his family from a Hollow. The story modes for each character vary and an additional 22 episodes can be unlocked upon completing the new unlocked episodes after Rescue Rukia. A 23rd episode more accurately details the Soul Society arc beginning with Ichigo's fight against Ganju Shiba and ending with Sousuke Aizen's betrayal.

== Gameplay ==
Battles in Bleach are between two and four characters in any combination of teams and enemies. Both ally and enemy characters can either be AI-controlled, or controlled by other players via Nintendo WFC or DS Wireless Communications. Like Treasure's earlier anime fighting game, Yū Yū Hakusho Makyō Tōitsusen, the game features two planes that players can jump between, accommodating up to four players. The fighting in Bleach is controlled through a combination of the D-pad, the A, X, B and Y buttons and the touch screen. The D-pad is used for moving the character, the A, X, Y and B buttons are used to attack using a light, medium or heavy attack or initiate a flash step and the touch screen is used to initiate special attacks, RF moves and use special status affecting cards.

The gameplay in The Blade of Fate remains mostly unchanged from the Japanese version apart from several fixed balance issues. The most notable addition is an "anti-air" system; attacks coming from the ground cannot be blocked in the air, which alters the gameplay significantly. It allows attack opportunities and traps not possible in the original game.

== Reception ==
Reception

Aggregate score
Aggregator	Score
Metacritic	83/100

Review scores
Publication	Score
1Up.com	A−
Edge	7/10
Eurogamer	6/10
Famitsu	31/40 (C+A) 30/40
GameDaily	9/10
GameSpot	8.5/10
GameSpy	4/5
GameZone	8.7/10
IGN	8.5/10
Nintendo Life	9/10
Nintendo Power	8.5/10
Nintendo World Report	(US) 8.5/10 (JP) 8/10
Pocket Gamer	4.5/5

The game received "favorable" reviews according to video game review aggregator Metacritic. In Japan, Famitsu gave it a score of three eights and one seven for a total of 31 out of 40, while Famitsu Cube + Advance gave it a score of two eights and two sevens for a total of 30 out of 40.

The game was also awarded Best Fighting Game of 2007 by IGN.

== See also ==
- Bleach
- Bleach: Dark Souls
- List of Bleach video games
- List of Nintendo DS games
