= Bleach: The 3rd Phantom =

2008 video game

- North American box art
- Developer: Tom Create
- Publisher: Sega
- Platform: Nintendo DS
- Release: JP: June 26, 2008; NA: September 15, 2009; AU: February 11, 2010; EU: February 12, 2010
- Genre: Tactical role-playing game
- Mode: Single player

Bleach: The 3rd Phantom (ブリーチ ザ・サード・ファントム, Burīchi Za Sādo Fantomu) is a tactical role-playing game for Nintendo DS based on the popular manga written by Tite Kubo. It was released in 2008–2010 and is published by Sega.

== Storyline ==
This game features a spin-off storyline in the Bleach continuity written for this game by Tite Kubo himself. The story differs according to the chosen gender of the game. Two shinigami, Matsuri Kudo and her twin brother Fujimaru, obtain positions in the 5th Division under their adoptive father Seigen Suzunami. The two fend off an Arrancar named Arturo Plateado (debuted from the Bleach: Shattered Blade Wii game) who is bent on the destruction of Soul Society. After their 'final battle' with the strange Arrancar, the twins are suspended in time, until their reawakening in the present day. The player chooses to play as Fujimaru or Matsuri. In the living world, the chosen character meets Ichigo Kurosaki and a strange girl named Shiyo as well as many of the other characters of Bleach. It is here that they learn about the true intentions of their former 5th Division Vice Captain Aizen Sōsuke, as well as the passing of many of their dear friends and family. Acquaintances of Kaien Shiba, Rukia Kuchiki, Renji Abarai, Rangiku Matsumoto, Gin Ichimaru, Momo Hinamori, Tōshirō Hitsugaya, and even Soifon, the twins are genuinely surprised to discover that all of these children now outrank them, and are confronted with sadness upon discovery of the true extent of this lost time.

The player character soon discovers that Seigen and the other twin are indeed still alive, but have joined forces with Aizen, believing that Soul Society organized the death of Konoka Suzunami and the destruction of the Suzunami House.

After many battles, the player character finally reunites with his/her sister/brother, and together they resolve to bring Seigen back to Soul Society. However, they are unable to do so, as Seigen has been transformed into a gigantic, bestial Hollow-like monster. Not truly a Visored, and closer in appearance to an Arrancar, Seigen is used as a weapon against Soul Society. Fujimaru and Matsuri decide to lead an expedition team to Hueco Mundo in order to defeat Aizen once and for all. They never do get that far, as after attacking the monster Seigen, they are transported into a strange 'in-between' place, where they defeat Seigen, momentarily returning him to his own form, before he, Konoka and Shiyo fade away from life.

The game ends with Fujimaru and Matsuri rejecting the offer of returning to the Gotei 13 as high-ranking officers to instead go to the living world to protect all the reincarnated souls.

== Gameplay ==
Unlike the two first Bleach DS games, The 3rd Phantom is not a fighting game, but a turn-based tactic game. Two teams fight each other's on an isometrically viewed battlefield in a style similar to the Final Fantasy Tactics and Fire Emblem games. When a character attacks an opponent, the screen switches to a side view, similar to the Bleach DS fighting games. If two teammates are near the same opponent, they can perform a tag team move more powerful than the basic ones which may make it easier to kill an enemy. This game also allows characters to use kido and other special moves (e.g. Getsuga Tensho, Senkei and Tsugi no mai Hakuren). The player's characters will earn experience points, which will increase their stats and unlock new abilities, after a battle is won.

=== Free Time ===
At least once per chapter, there is a gameplay section called "Free Time". In this section, the player spends time with other characters in the game while moving across a board game-like area, with Kon acting as a sort of game piece. The player has a limited number of Action Points (AP) to use, which is also how many spaces are left until the goal space. The player chooses event panels, which cause them to spend time with the character portrayed on the panel. There are colored lights which tells the player how many spaces Kon will move after the event ends, which also shows how many AP is consumed (ex: 2 spaces = 2 AP consumed). Free Time ends when the player lands on or passes the Goal Space (AP hits zero). Going through certain event panels unlocks other panels, and even secret characters. If an event panel has a bonus icon in one or more of the corners, the player gets that bonus once the event ends.

Bonuses are as follows:

- Exclamation Mark = The event will disappear after the current free time session.
- Treasure Chest = Items.
- Fist = Stat Increase (usually HP).
- Heart = Affiliation with character on panel increases, sometimes the affiliation with another character will increase as well. On certain panels with this bonus, if the players choose the right dialogue option, the character on the event panel will join your team. Early examples of this are Kira, Hisagi, and Komamura, and these scene's usually have the character name and the word "cooperation" in the title of the event (ex: Kira's Cooperation, Hisagi's Cooperation, Komamura's Cooperation).
- Sword = Training, happens midway through the game.
- Hot Springs Symbol = A hot springs scene. This is basically a fan service scene where the character on the panel is seen in the hot springs or bathing. Sometimes it involves more than one character. More are available in Bleach Tower, which is unlocked after beating the game. More Hot Springs scenes are available if the player plays as Matsuri (the girl) than if the player plays as Fujimaru (the boy).

Some spaces have bonuses on them, and if Kon lands on a space with a bonus, the player gets it. All the bonuses that are on the particular free time segment board are listed on the top screen in order of appearance, along with the board and Kon. The bonuses are the same as in event panels, excluding Exclamation Mark and Heart, with a new bonus thrown in, a D-shaped like Kon's paw. This is called "Discount" which decreases the amount of AP/spaces an event panel uses up/moves Kon. Event panels cannot go below 1 AP/space.

Also, there is strategy to this mode. Players must carefully choose which panels to use. If Kon passes a space with a bonus on it, the player will not get it. If Kon lands on a yellow and black striped space, called a pit, free time ends automatically.

== Characters ==
This game has around 60 playable characters. Most of the cast from Bleach: Dark Souls returns and the newcomers include Shinigami Retsu Unohana, Yumichika Ayasegawa, Kaien Shiba and Jidanbō, Visoreds Shinji Hirako and Hiyori Sarugaki, and Arrancars Ulquiorra Schiffer, Grimmjow Jaegerjaques, Yammy Riyalgo, as well as the Números. Sōjirō Kusaka, the antagonist of the film Bleach: The DiamondDust Rebellion, is featured in the game.

During their journey, the Kudo siblings will also meet younger versions of Rukia Kuchiki, Renji Abarai, Tōshirō Hitsugaya, Rangiku Matsumoto, Momo Hinamori, Gin Ichimaru, Suì-Fēng and Kenpachi Zaraki.

Characters created for this game, aside from Matsuri and Fujimaru Kudo, include former 5th Division Captain Seigen Suzunami who raised the Kudo twins, his sister Konoka and a girl in the living world named Shiyo.

The Vizards including Ichigo are unable to transform into their hollow form in this game but when Shinji Hirako and Hiyori Sarugaki do special attacks in the battle scene they will put their hollow mask on.

== Music ==
The theme song of the game is "Remaining Wind" (残り風, Nokori kaze) by Ikimono-gakari. The band also performed the Bleach anime seventh ending song.

== Reception ==
Reception

Aggregate score
Aggregator	Score
Metacritic	59/100

Review scores
Publication	Score
Famitsu	28/40
GamesRadar+	2.5/5
GamesTM	5/10
GameZone	7/10
IGN	7/10
NGamer	63%
Nintendo Life	6/10
Nintendo Power	4/10
Nintendo World Report	5/10
Official Nintendo Magazine	72%

The game received "mixed" reviews according to video game review aggregator Metacritic. In Japan, Famitsu gave it a score of two sevens, one six, and one eight, for a total of 28 out of 40.
