= Bleach: Shattered Blade =

2006 video game

- Developer: Polygon Magic
- Publisher: Sega
- Platform: Wii
- Release: JP: December 14, 2006; NA: October 9, 2007; AU: February 28, 2008; EU: February 29, 2008
- Genre: Fighting game
- Modes: Single-player, multiplayer

Bleach: Shattered Blade, known in Japan as Bleach Wii: Hakujin Kirameku Rondo (Bleach Wii 白刃きらめく輪舞曲), is a 3D fighting game that features the cast of characters from the Bleach anime and manga. It was developed by Polygon Magic and published by Sega for the Wii in 2006–2008. The player is able to swing the characters' swords by using the Wii Remote.

Sega, in conjunction with Bleach creator Tite Kubo, designed a character specifically for the game, named Arturo Plateado.

== Plot ==
A self-made arrancar named Arturo Plateado once stormed Soul Society, but was trapped beneath Sōkyoku Hill by the Gotei 13 two-thousand years prior to the start of Bleach. When the Sōkyoku was destroyed during Ichigo Kurosaki's rescue of Rukia Kuchiki, the seal placed on Arturo was broken and he was freed.

Arturo decides to impersonate various figures, his disguises ranging from captains to zanpakutō spirits, in an attempt to trick others into regaining the pieces of the destroyed Sōkyoku in order to absorb them into his body and become more powerful. Depending on the game's outcome, he is either purified and defeated or obtains the Sōkyoku and carries on to decimate the Soul Society.

== Reception ==
Reception

Aggregate score
Aggregator	Score
Metacritic	58/100

Review scores
Publication	Score
Eurogamer	4/10
Famitsu	27/40
GameDaily	7/10
GameSpot	3.5/10
GameSpy	2/5 stars
GameZone	7.5/10
IGN	6.3/10
Nintendo Life	7/10 stars
Nintendo World Report	5/10
Official Nintendo Magazine	60%
411Mania	7.3/10

The game received "mixed" reviews according to the review aggregation website Metacritic. In Japan, Famitsu gave it a score of two sevens, one six, and one seven for a total of 27 out of 40.
