= Bleach: Dark Souls =

2007 video game

- North American box art
- Developer: Treasure
- Publisher: Sega
- Director: Tetsuya Iizuka
- Platform: Nintendo DS
- Release: JP: February 15, 2007; NA: October 7, 2008; EU: March 6, 2009; AU: March 12, 2009
- Genre: Fighting
- Modes: Single-player, multiplayer

Bleach: Dark Souls, known in Japan as Bleach DS 2nd Kokui Hirameku Chinkonka (Note: Japanese: BLEACH DS 2nd 黒衣ひらめく鎮魂歌(レクイエム), Hepburn: Burīchi DS 2nd Kokui Hirameku Chinkonka; lit. "Bleach DS 2nd: The Black-clothed Flickering Requiem") is a fighting game developed by Treasure and published by Sega for the Nintendo DS. It is the second Bleach game released for the console. The game introduces new characters, and adds new moves for the older characters as well as introducing new game modes. Bleach: Dark Souls also includes Hollows of varying sizes, for players to fight. The number of Reifu cards in-game are also increased from the original, and more cards (four cards, instead of the previous game's two) are displayed on the touch screen during battle. The Wi-Fi battle mode has been improved to make it easier to play online. The game's theme song is "Resistance" by High and Mighty Color.

== Plot ==
Taking place right after Aizen's defection from the Soul Society, a festival is being held. Ichigo and the others attend before going home. However, some special Mod Souls have been accidentally uncovered by a member of the Department of Research and Development; one of the Mod Souls, Kai, takes the form of the researcher and takes his fellow Mod souls away. Some of the Mod Souls begin festering with hatred and transform into copies of Hollows, such as Shrieker and Grand Fisher, causing havoc throughout the seireitei.

== Reception ==
Reception

Aggregate score
Aggregator	Score
Metacritic	82/100

Review scores
Publication	Score
1Up.com	B+
Famitsu	30/40
GamePro	4/5
GameSpot	8/10
GamesRadar+	4/5
IGN	8.5/10
Nintendo Life	8/10
Nintendo Power	8.5/10
PALGN	8/10
Pocket Gamer	4.5/5
Den of Geek	4/5
Teletext GameCentral	8/10

Bleach: Dark Souls received "favorable" reviews according to video game review aggregator Metacritic. In Japan, Famitsu gave it a score of one eight, one seven, one eight, and one seven, for a total of 30 out of 40.

The game was awarded as the Best Fighting Game for the Nintendo DS in IGN's 2008 video game awards.

== See also ==
- Bleach: The Blade of Fate
