= Blue Exorcist: The Movie =

2012 Japanese animated film by Atsushi Takahashi

- Theatrical release poster
- Kanji: 青の祓魔師(エクソシスト) 劇場版
- Revised Hepburn: Ao no Ekusoshisuto Gekijōban
- Directed by: Atsushi Takahashi
- Screenplay by: Reiko Yoshida
- Based on: Blue Exorcist by Kazue Kato
- Produced by: Takamitsu Inoue; Tetsuto Motoyasu; Hiroo Maruyama; Kozue Kaneniwa; Makoto Furukawa; Manabu Endo; Arimasa Okada; Miho Ueda; Yoshiko Kiriyama
- Starring: Nobuhiko Okamoto; Jun Fukuyama; Kana Hanazawa; Kazuya Nakai; Kōji Yusa; Yūki Kaji; Eri Kitamura; Ayahi Takagaki; Rina Satō; Daisuke Ono; Hiroshi Kamiya; Keiji Fujiwara; Rie Kugimiya; Hidenobu Kiuchi
- Cinematography: Toru Fukushi
- Edited by: Takeshi Seyama
- Music by: Hiroyuki Sawano
- Production company: A-1 Pictures
- Distributed by: Toho
- Release date: December 28, 2012
- Running time: 90 minutes
- Country: Japan
- Language: Japanese
- Box office: US$5.99 million

Blue Exorcist: The Movie (Japanese: 青の祓魔師(エクソシスト) 劇場版, Hepburn: Ao no Ekusoshisuto Gekijōban) is a 2012 Japanese animated film based on Blue Exorcist manga series by Kazue Kato. The film is produced by A-1 Pictures and directed by Atsushi Takahashi from a script written by Reiko Yoshida. It follows Rin Okumura meeting a demon boy, who is connected to the ongoing festival at True Cross Academy.

The film was announced in September 2011, with Takahashi and Yoshida helming it in March 2012, and stars Nobuhiko Okamoto, Jun Fukuyama, Kana Hanazawa, Kazuya Nakai, Kōji Yusa, Yūki Kaji, Eri Kitamura, Ayahi Takagaki, Rina Satō, Daisuke Ono, Hiroshi Kamiya, Keiji Fujiwara, Rie Kugimiya, and Hidenobu Kiuchi.

Blue Exorcist: The Movie was released in Japan on December 28, 2012, and in the United States on August 17, 2013. The film grossed over $5 million worldwide.

== Plot ==
Centuries ago, a demon lived in a small village and gained the sympathy of the villagers. As they left their land unattended to spend time with the demon, the villagers lost all of their goods. An exorcist then arrived to permanently seal the demon and protect the village again.

In the present day, preparations for a festival, which is celebrated every 11 years, are ongoing around True Cross Campus Town. Rin Okumura and his brother Yukio, and Shiemi Moriyama are sent on a mission to exorcise the "Phantom Train" that got lost control after Rin and Shiemi tried to save the ghosts that are unconsciously trapped inside. After the fight, one of the demons inside the Phantom Train escapes. Rin later encounters the little demon with a child-like appearance and names it Usamaro. Usamaro is taken by the exorcists, but Rin opposes their decision to exorcise him so they give him the duty to look after the demon instead. Usamaro is revealed to be a benevolent kami that became a demon after suffering the pain of being betrayed and abandoned by the villagers he cared for and had used his power to erase the bad memories from their minds to make everyone live through happiness. While living with Rin, Usamaro uses his power to make him and his other exorcists his friends and forget about their tasks of protecting the town during the festival.

As a result, the town is infested with demons. During these circumstances, Rin discovers Usamaro's power and learns that he is the same demon of the tale his father, Shiro Fujimoto, shared with him and Yukio when they were only children. Thanks to their friendship, Rin helps Usumaro understand how valuable memories are, even the painful ones, and makes him promise to never use his power again, to which the little demon agrees. Although he is accepted by Rin as part of his family, Usamaro decides to sacrifice himself due to the demons taking control of the city, breaking his promise. In the end, everyone seems to forget about Usamaro's existence and the chaos that occurred during the festival, but Rin seems to remember Usamaro and will visit his temple, promising him that he will never forget him.

== Voice cast ==
Character	Japanese	English
Rin Okumura	Nobuhiko Okamoto Akeno Watanabe (young)	Bryce Papenbrook Wendee Lee (young)
Yukio Okumura	Jun Fukuyama Ayumi Fujimura (young)	Johnny Yong Bosch Stephanie Sheh (young)
Shiemi Moriyama	Kana Hanazawa	Christine Marie Cabanos
Ryuji Suguro	Kazuya Nakai	Kyle Hebert
Renzo Shima	Kōji Yusa	Brian Beacock
Konekomaru Miwa	Yūki Kaji	Mona Marshall
Izumo Kamiki	Eri Kitamura	Kira Buckland
Kuro	Ayahi Takagaki	Stephanie Sheh
Shura Kirigakure	Rina Satō	Wendee Lee
Arthur Auguste Angel	Daisuke Ono	David Vincent
Mephisto Pheles	Hiroshi Kamiya	Sam Riegel
Shiro Fujimoto	Keiji Fujiwara	Kirk Thornton
Usamaro	Rie Kugimiya	Cassandra Morris
Cheng-Long Liu	Hidenobu Kiuchi	Todd Haberkorn
Amaimon	Tetsuya Kakihara	Darrel Guilbeau
Nii	Nao Tōyama	Cassandra Morris
Kaoru Tsubaki	Kazuhiro Ōguro	Doug Erholtz
Reiji Shiratori	Kentarō Itō	Derek Stephen Prince

== Production ==
In September 2011, an anime film adaptation of Kazue Kato's manga series Blue Exorcist was confirmed via the release of the November issue of Jump Square magazine. In March 2012, Atsushi Takahashi was announced to be directing the film at A-1 Pictures, along with Reiko Yoshida as the screenwriter, Keigo Sasaki as the character designer, and Shinji Kimura as the art director. The cast of the 2011 anime television series Blue Exorcist returned to reprise their roles for the film, with Rie Kugimiya and Hidenobu Kiuchi joining them in October 2012 to respectively voice the new characters Usamaro, a boy demon, and Cheng-Long Liu, an exorcist from Taiwan. The English dub cast also reprised their roles for the film.

== Music ==
In March 2012, Hiroyuki Sawano was announced to be composing Blue Exorcist: The Movie, after previously doing so for its anime television series. UVERworld also returned in October 2012 to perform the film's theme music titled "Reversi". The film's original soundtrack was released in Japan on December 19, 2012.

Blue Exorcist: The Movie – Original Soundtrack track listing
No.	Title	Length
1.	"Shuku Eigaka!!"	1:45
2.	"Shuku 1000M!!"	4:26
3.	"Battle Scars"	4:05
4.	"Ni Kazu Shio Ha Chu Ei U Jo"	3:33
5.	"Ni Fuoha Gen Den No I Tai Ke"	4:09
6.	"20121228"	5:44
7.	"Matsuri"	5:57
8.	"En Kin Nai Kan Sin Ki Ei Satsu"	3:11
9.	"I Na Ra Ke Ha Ki Se No E Ma"	4:12
10.	"Kekkai"	5:46
11.	"Coal Tar"	4:11
12.	"Blue"	3:57
13.	"Usa-Maro"	4:50
14.	"TV Outtake"	11:19
Total length:		67:05

== Marketing ==
In July 2012, a teaser trailer for Blue Exorcist: The Movie was released. The film's full trailer was released in November 2012. A day before the premiere, a promotional video for the film was released. On December 28, 2012, the film's novelization written by Aya Yajima was released.

Promotional partners for the film included the convenience store chains Circle K Sunkus and FamilyMart, Morinaga & Company, the hot spring theme park Ooedo Onsen Monogatari, Kyoto Municipal Transportation Bureau, and Daiichi Kosho Company's karaoke chain Big Echo.

== Release ==
=== Theatrical ===
Blue Exorcist: The Movie was released in Japan on December 28, 2012. The film held its American premiere at Anime Expo in Los Angeles in July 2013 and had limited screenings in the United States on August 17. The film was also released in the United Kingdom on February 9, 2014.

=== Home media ===
Blue Exorcist: The Movie was released on Blu-ray and DVD in Japan on July 3, 2013, and in the United States on December 17. The film was released on Blu-ray, DVD, and digital in Australia and New Zealand by Madman Entertainment in April 2014.

== Reception ==
=== Box office ===
Blue Exorcist: The Movie grossed $5.97 million in Japan and $21,796 in the United States, for a worldwide total of $5.99 million. The film ranked seventh in its opening weekend in Japan, placing behind The Hobbit: An Unexpected Journey (2012).

=== Critical response ===
Carl Kimlinger of Anime News Network graded Blue Exorcist: The Movie "B+", feeling that the film was a "sumptuous spectacle with a warm, beating heart—a tightly-constructed romp with enough humor and headlong action to earn its shonen-action label but that never forgets that real feelings always trump fantasy fightin[g]". He praised the "meticulous, sometimes surreal beauty" of the world of True Cross due to A-1 Pictures' "gorgeous cinematic artwork" and "fluid camerawork". Conversely, Sarah of Anime UK News gave the film 6 out of 10, finding it "thin on dramatic content". She felt that the story would be a "good chapter or two in the manga, or a single episode of the TV series" instead of making it into a film.
