= Bryce Papenbrook =

American voice actor (born 1986)

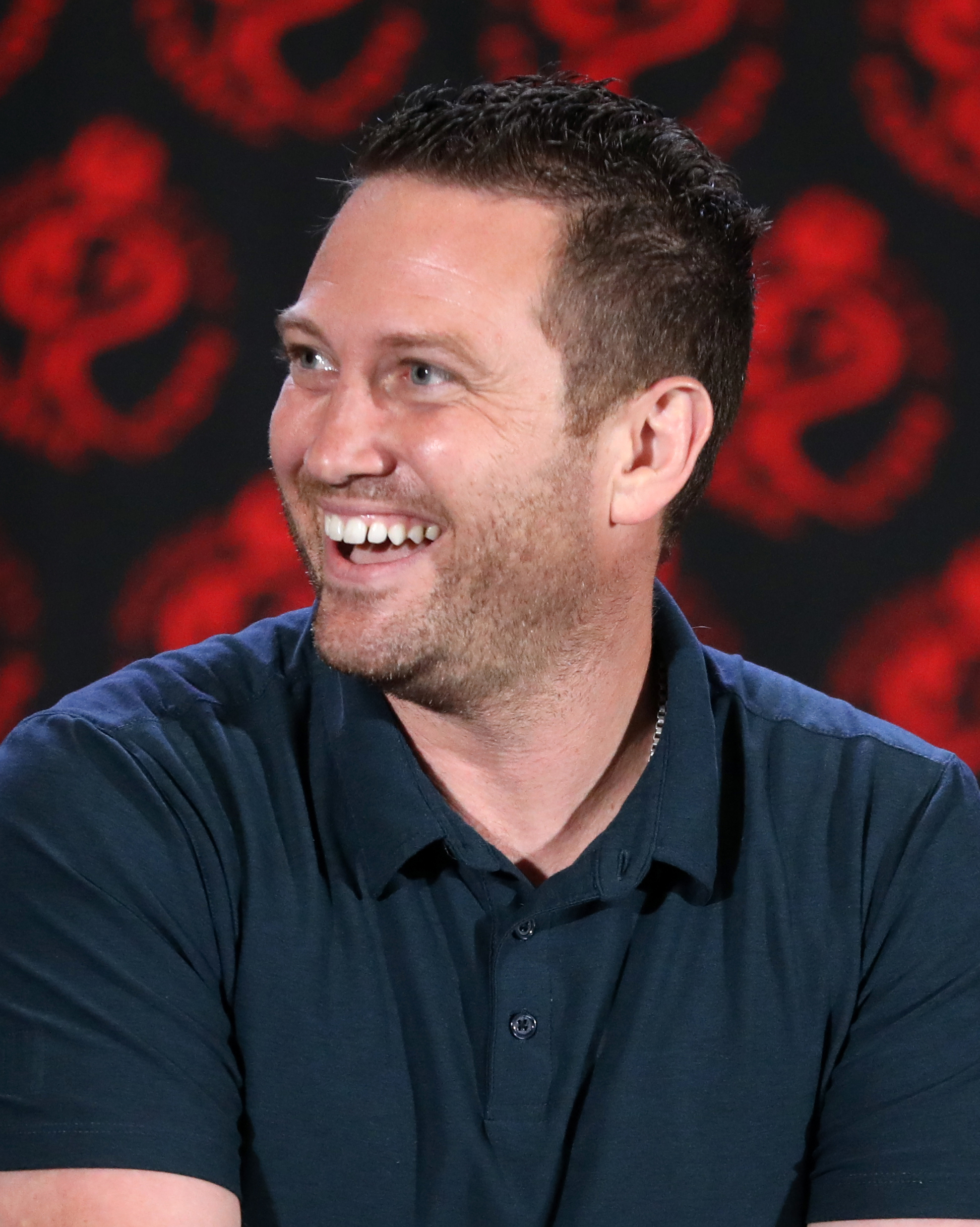
- Papenbrook in 2024
- Born: February 24, 1986 (age 40); Los Angeles, California, U.S.
- Other name: Bryce Rothstein
- Education: University of California, Los Angeles
- Occupation: Voice actor
- Years active: 1994–present
- Spouse: Samantha Papenbrook
- Children: 3
- Parents: Bob Papenbrook (father); Debbie Rothstein (mother)

Signature
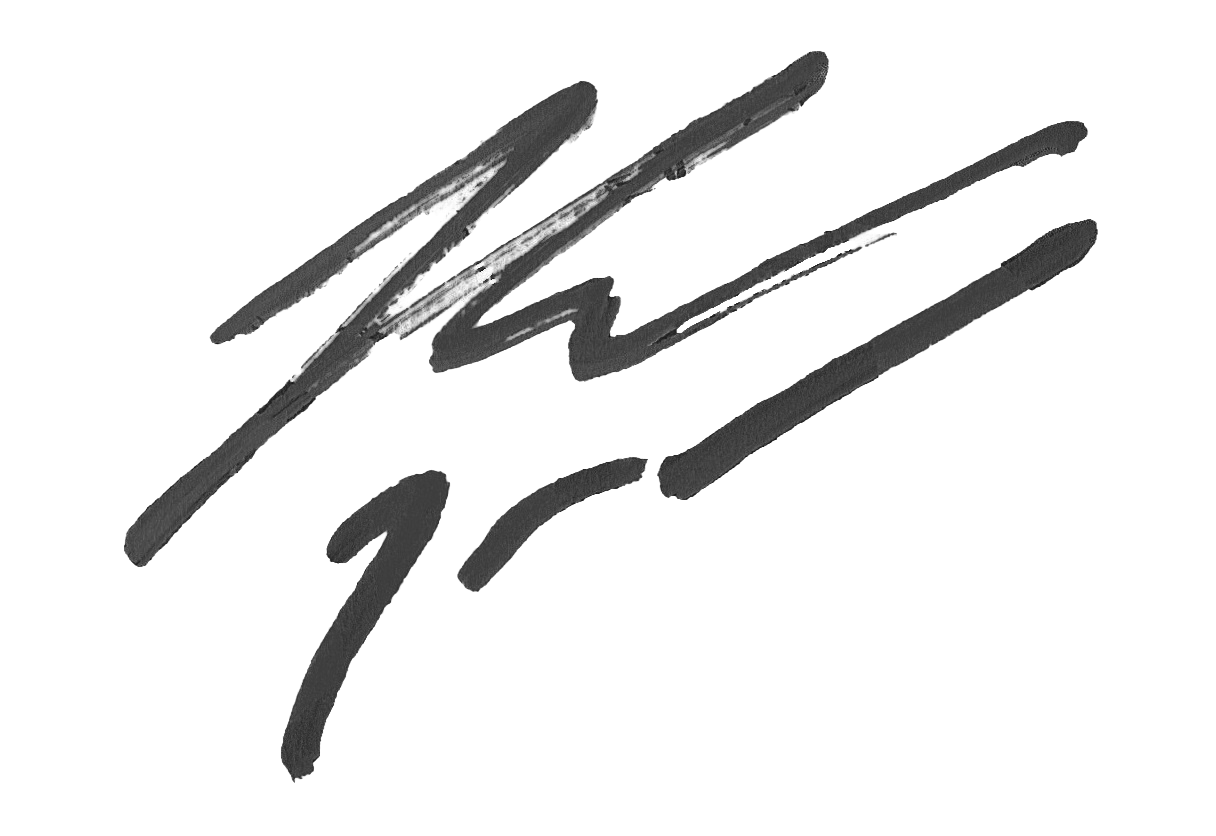

Bryce Papenbrook (born February 24, 1986), sometimes credited as Bryce Rothstein, is an American voice actor. He is a prolific performer, with hundreds of credits across film, television, and video games, and is known in particular for his work on English-language anime dubs.

== Early life ==
Bryce Papenbrook's parents were both voice actors. When he was a child, Bryce says he accompanied his father to a Power Rangers recording session. The director needed a child voice actor, and the senior Papenbrook volunteered his son—"that was it, I was a voice actor," said the younger Papenbrook.

Papenbrook attended UCLA for political science and philosophy. He planned to go to law school and also trained in martial arts, contemplating a career as a Muay Thai fighter. But he had already booked a voice acting role and instead decided to focus on his voice acting career.

== Career ==
Papenbrook is best known for his work in English dubs of Japanese anime. His credits are numerous and he has voiced both major characters and a multitude of smaller roles.

Papenbrook has also worked in film, non-Japanese animation, and has dozens of credits in video games.

== Personal life ==
Papenbrook is an avid martial artist, practicing American Tang Soo Do. He has also worked as a kickboxing instructor in addition to voice acting. Papenbrook and his wife have three children together.

== Filmography ==
=== Anime ===
List of dubbing performances in anime
Year	Series	Role	Notes	Source
2002	Genma Wars: Eve of Mythology Chapter	Loof		
2003	Trigun	Young Vash the Stampede		
2004	.hack//Legend of the Twilight	Shugo Kunisaki		
2004	Eiken	Densuke Mifune		
2006	Green Green	Yuusuke Takasaki		
2007	MÄR	Jack		
2007	Noein	Isami Fujiwara		
2008	Buso Renkin	Shusui Hayasaka		
2010	Kekkaishi	Hiromu Tabata		
2010	Vampire Knight series	Hanabusa Aido		
2011	Durarara!!	Masaomi Kida		
2012	Marvel Anime: Blade	Edgar Frost		
2012	Nura: Rise of the Yokai Clan series	Ryota Nekko, Kappa		
2012–present	Blue Exorcist	Rin Okumura	Also Kyoto Saga and Movie	
2013	B-Daman Crossfire	Basara Kurochi		
2013	Digimon Fusion	Bearmon, Coronamon		
2013	Pokémon Origins	Red		
2013–14	Tenkai Knights	Chooki Mason, Lydendor		
2013–present	Sword Art Online series	Kazuto "Kirito" Kirigaya	3 TV series and Ordinal Scale	
2014	Blood Lad	Staz		
2014	Sailor Moon	Kijin Shinokawa, Kakusui Yakushiji, Masanori Tsuzuki, Hiroki	Viz Media dub	
2014	Space Dandy	Ukuleleman	Ep. 15; First Funimation role	
2014–2024	Attack on Titan series	Eren Yeager	First major role at Funimation, 4 seasons	
2015	A Lull in the Sea	Kaname Isaki		
2015	BlazBlue Alter Memory	Takamagahara		
2015	Aldnoah.Zero	Calm Craftman		
2015	Soul Eater Not!	Clay Sizemore		
2015	Fate/stay night: Unlimited Blade Works	Shirou Emiya		
2015	JoJo's Bizarre Adventure	Caesar Zeppeli		
2015	Danganronpa: The Animation	Makoto Naegi		
2015	Attack on Titan: Junior High	Eren Yeager		
2015–16	Durarara!!×2	Masaomi Kida		
2015–21	The Seven Deadly Sins	Meliodas, Zeldris		
2016	Brothers Conflict	Wataru Asahina		
2016	Assassination Classroom	Rikuto Ikeda	Episode 13	
2016	Cyborg 009 vs Devilman	Devilman / Akira Fudō		
2016	Ajin	Kaito		
2016	Kuromukuro	Kennosuke Tokisada Ouma		
2016	Mobile Suit Gundam: Iron-Blooded Orphans	Eugene Sevenstark		
2016	One-Punch Man	Marugori		
2016	Danganronpa 3: The End of Hope's Peak Academy	Makoto Naegi, Nagito Komaeda		
2016	Charlotte	Sho		
2016	Pokémon Generations	Buck		
2017	Tales of Zestiria the X	Sorey	Episodes 17–20 (Simuldub) Substituting for Robbie Daymond	
2017	DokiDoki! PreCure	Lance	Known as Glitter Force: Doki-Doki outside of Japan.	
2018	Devilman Crybaby	Moyuru Koda		
2018	Children of the Whales	Suou		
2018	Terraformars	Enrique, Hans, Alexander Asimov		
2018	Twin Star Exorcists	Rokuro Enmado		
2018	My Hero Academia	Yo Shindo		
2019	Inazuma Eleven Ares	Basile Hardy, Jude Sharp		
2019	Kengan Ashura	Cosmo Imai, Keizaburo Sawada		
2019	Bungo Stray Dogs	Karma	Episode 29	
2019	Boruto: Naruto Next Generations	Kagura Karatachi		
2019	Teasing Master Takagi-san	Kimura	Season 2	
2019	The Disastrous Life of Saiki K.: Reawakened	Akechi Touma		
2019	Revisions	Daisuke		
2019–present	Demon Slayer: Kimetsu no Yaiba	Inosuke Hashibira		
2020	Marvel Future Avengers	Kei Kawade, Josh Richardson		
2020	Beastars	Tao, Kibi, Lycaon		
2020	Drifting Dragons	Soroya		
2020	My Next Life as a Villainess: All Routes Lead to Doom!	Alan Stuart	Crunchyroll dub	
2020	Dorohedoro	Fujita		
2021	Sleepy Princess in the Demon Castle	Ghost Shroud, Paladin		
2021	Godzilla Singular Point	Additional Voice	Netflix dub	
2021	To Your Eternity	Gugu (adolescent)		
2021	Tokyo Revengers	Nahoya Kawata		
2021	Kuroko's Basketball	Shigehiro Ogiwara	Netflix dub	
2021	Black Clover	Liebe		
2021	King's Raid: Successors of the Will	Kyle		
2021	Ranking of Kings	Hokuro		
2021	The Vampire Dies in No Time	Gamer Boy		
2022	Odd Taxi	Koshiro Daimon		
2022	Cyberpunk: Edgerunners	Julio		
2023	One Piece	The Guy with Gold Spiky Helmet	Episode 635	
2024	Mission: Yozakura Family	Goliath	Hulu dub	
2025	Pokémon Horizons – The Search for Laqua	Grusha		
2025	My Melody & Kuromi	Baku		
2025	Dandadan	Kinta Sakata	Season 2	

=== Animation ===
List of voice performances in animation
Year	Series	Role	Notes	Source
2015	Be Cool, Scooby-Doo!	Linecook, Cheese Sandwich	Episode: "Kitchen Frightmare"	
2015–present	Miraculous: Tales of Ladybug & Cat Noir	Adrien Agreste/Cat Noir, Félix Fathom/Argos	Main role (Cat Noir), Secondary Character (Félix)	
2017–21	Dennis & Gnasher: Unleashed!	Dennis the Menace	Main role (US dub only)	
2019	YooHoo to the Rescue	Multiple roles	Main role	
2020	Dagon: Troll World Chronicles	Gallows	Supporting character	

=== Film ===
List of voice performances in feature films
Year	Movie	Role	Notes	Source
2006	Dog Lover's Symphony	Toby		
2013	Blue Exorcist: The Movie	Rin Okumura	Limited theatrical release, Aniplex	
2017	Sword Art Online: Ordinal Scale	Kazuto "Kirito" Kirigaya	Limited theatrical release, Aniplex	
2018	Fate/stay night: Heaven's Feel I. presage flower	Shirou Emiya	Limited theatrical release, Aniplex	
2021	Demon Slayer: Kimetsu no Yaiba the Movie: Mugen Train	Inosuke Hashibira	Limited theatrical release, Aniplex	
2021	Sword Art Online Progressive: Aria of a Starless Night	Kazuto "Kirito" Kirigaya	Limited theatrical release, Aniplex	
2022	Drifting Home	Kōsuke Kumagaya	Theatrical release, Studio Colorido; Simultaneous release on Netflix	
2023	Deemo: Memorial Keys	Mirai, Hans	Limited theatrical release	
2023	Ladybug & Cat Noir: The Movie	Cat Noir / Adrien Agreste	Netflix	
2023	Sword Art Online Progressive: Scherzo of Deep Night	Kazuto "Kirito" Kirigaya	Limited theatrical release, Aniplex	
2023	Digimon Adventure 02: The Beginning	Cody Hida	Limited theatrical release	

List of voice performances in direct-to-video and television films
Year	Series	Role	Notes	Source
2014	Naruto Shippuden the Movie: Blood Prison	Young Muku		
2017	Blame!	Fusata		
2019	Fate/stay night: Heaven's Feel II. lost butterfly	Shirou Emiya		
2018	The Seven Deadly Sins the Movie: Prisoners of the Sky	Meliodas		
2020	Digimon Adventure: Last Evolution Kizuna	Cody Hida		
2021	Fate/stay night: Heaven's Feel III. spring song	Shirou Emiya		
2024	Digimon Adventure	Red Greymon	Uncut dub, Discotek Media	
2024	Digimon Adventure: Our War Game!	Older Brother 2A, Additional Voices	Uncut dub, Discotek Media	
2024	Digimon Adventure 02: Digimon Hurricane Touchdown!! / Transcendent Evolution! The Golden Digimentals	Boy Soccer Player 3A	Uncut dub, Discotek Media	

List of live-action dubbing performances
Year	Series	Role	Source
2004	Art of the Devil	Ong	
2004	The Sisters (2004 Thai film)	Genji Takita	
2012	Violetta (telenovela)	Maxi	

=== Video games ===
List of voice performances in video games
Year	Title	Role	Notes	Source
2005	Dynasty Warriors series	Guan Ping	From 5 to 8	
2005	Radiata Stories	Jack Russell		
2009	Dissidia Final Fantasy	Zidane Tribal	Also 012	
2010	Lost Planet 2	Various		
2011	Ar Tonelico Qoga: Knell of Ar Ciel	Aoto		
2012	Tales of Graces f	Asbel Lhant		
2013	Fire Emblem Awakening	Henry		
2013	Atelier Ayesha: The Alchemist of Dusk	Ernie Lyttelton		
2013	Shin Megami Tensei IV	Issachar		
2013	Armored Core: Verdict Day	Various pilots, AI		
2013	Rune Factory 4	Lest	Also Special	
2013	Pac-Man and the Ghostly Adventures	Inky		
2013	Power Rangers Megaforce	Black Ranger		
2013	Call of Duty: Ghosts	US Army 1		
2013	Ys: Memories of Celceta	Adol Christin, Panza		
2014	Bravely Default	Tiz Arrior	Grouped under Cast in closing credits	
2014	Danganronpa: Trigger Happy Havoc	Makoto Naegi	Uncredited	
2014	Earth Defense Force 2025	Ranger 27		
2014	Mind Zero	Nobuhiko Watanabe		
2014	Danganronpa 2: Goodbye Despair	Nagito Komaeda, Makoto Naegi	Uncredited	
2014	Persona Q: Shadow of the Labyrinth	Theodore		
2014	Power Rangers Super Megaforce	Various voices		
2015	Final Fantasy Type-0 HD	Machina Kunagiri		
2015	Danganronpa Another Episode: Ultra Despair Girls	Makoto Naegi, Nagito Komaeda/Servant		
2015	Xenoblade Chronicles X	Male Avatar (Rookie)		
2016	Elsword	Add		
2016	Bravely Second: End Layer	Tiz Arrior		
2016	Mobius Final Fantasy	Wol		
2016	Exist Archive: The Other Side of the Sky	Kanata Kujo		
2017	Fire Emblem Heroes	Henry, Kamui, Raven, Karel, Oscar		
2017	Horizon Zero Dawn	Bast		
2017	Nier: Automata	Additional voices		
2017	Danganronpa V3: Killing Harmony	Makoto Naegi, Nagito Komaeda		
2018	Dissidia Final Fantasy NT	Zidane Tribal		
2018	Persona 3: Dancing in Moonlight	Theodore		
2019	JumpStart Academy series	Frankie the Dog		
2019	Pokémon Masters	Lear		
2019	Lost Ark	Additional Voices		
2019	Daemon X Machina	Diablo		
2019	Shenmue III	Ge Longpi		
2019	Sonic the Hedgehog series	Silver the Hedgehog	Replaces Quinton Flynn	Resume
2020	One Punch Man: A Hero Nobody Knows	Lecture Man, Marugori		
2020	Phantasy Star Online 2	Jan, Kyokuya, Kirito	Guest Character (Kirito)	
2020	War of the Visions: Final Fantasy Brave Exvius	Prince Mont Leonis	Main Protagonist	
2020	The Legend of Heroes: Trails of Cold Steel IV	Captain Engels, Gilbert Stein		
2020	Yakuza: Like A Dragon	Additional voices		
2020	Sakuna: Of Rice and Ruin	Kinta		
2021	Ys IX: Monstrum Nox	Adol Christin		
2021	Tales of Arise	Law		
2021	Lost Judgment	Kosuke		
2021	Demon Slayer: Kimetsu no Yaiba – The Hinokami Chronicles	Inosuke Hashibira		
2022	Star Ocean: The Divine Force	Additional voices		
2023	Octopath Traveler II	Additional voices		
2023	The Legend of Heroes: Trails into Reverie	Gilbert Stein, Puck, Crossbell Guardian Force, Division Soldier, Citizen		
2023	Like a Dragon Gaiden: The Man Who Erased His Name	Additional voices		
2024	Like a Dragon: Infinite Wealth	Additional voices		
2024	Unicorn Overlord	Adel		
2024	Romancing SaGa 2: Revenge of the Seven	Hector/Mercenary (M)		
2024	Ys X: Nordics	Adol Christin		
2025	Like a Dragon: Pirate Yakuza in Hawaii	Additional voices		
2025	Xenoblade Chronicles X: Definitive Edition	Male Avatar (Rookie), additional voices		
2025	Date Everything!	Timothy, Timmy		
2025	Towa and the Guardians of the Sacred Tree	Gaihaku		
2025	Digimon Story: Time Stranger	Apollomon		
2026	Yakuza Kiwami 3 & Dark Ties	Additional voices		
2027	Danganronpa 2×2	Nagito Komaeda		
