= List of Blue Exorcist episodes =

Blue Exorcist is a Japanese anime television series based on Kazue Kato's manga series of the same name. The first season was directed by Tensai Okamura and produced by A-1 Pictures. The series follows a teenager named Rin Okumura who finds out he is the son of Satan and is determined to become an exorcist in order to defeat him after the death of his guardian, Father Fujimoto.

Blue Exorcist began broadcasting in Japan on MBS TV and TBS Television on April 17, 2011, and ended on October 2 of the same year. The series was originally scheduled to start airing on April 10, 2011, however due to the 2011 Tōhoku earthquake and tsunami, the series' initial broadcast was delayed by a week. The episodes were simulcast with English subtitles online via Hulu, Anime News Network, and Crunchyroll, starting on April 20, 2011. and Aniplex of America release Blue Exorcist on DVD in four sets, starting by releasing the first DVD on October 18, 2011. The first season also began broadcasting in North America on Viz Media's online network, Neon Alley, on October 2, 2012, and also later aired on Adult Swim's Toonami programming block from February 22 to August 9, 2014.

In June 2016, a second season, titled Blue Exorcist: Kyoto Saga, was announced and aired from January 7 to March 25, 2017. Koichi Hatsumi directed the sequel, while Toshiya Ōno wrote the scripts, Keigo Sasaki designed the characters, and Hiroyuki Sawano and Kohta Yamamoto composed the soundtrack. A-1 Pictures returned to produce the animation.

In December 2022, it was announced that the anime would receive a new television series adaptation. It was later revealed to be a third season, titled Blue Exorcist: Shimane Illuminati Saga, which adapted volumes 10–15 of the original manga. The sequel was produced by Studio VOLN and directed by Daisuke Yoshida, with scripts written by Toshiya Ōno, character designs handled by Yurie Oohigashi, and music composed by Hiroyuki Sawano and Kohta Yamamoto. It aired from January 7 to March 24, 2024, on Tokyo MX and other networks. (Note: Tokyo MX lists the season premiere on January 6 at 24:30, which is effectively January 7 at 12:30 a.m. JST)

In March 2024, at the AnimeJapan 2024 event, a fourth season was announced. In July 2024, it was announced that the staff from the Shimane Illuminati Saga will return for the season and that the season will run for two cours; the first cours, subtitled Beyond the Snow Saga, aired from October 6 to December 22, 2024, and the second cours, subtitled The Blue Night Saga, aired from January 5 to March 23, 2025.

== Series overview ==
Season	Episodes		Originally released		
Season	Episodes		First released	Last released	Network
1	25		April 17, 2011	October 2, 2011	JNN (MBS)
2	12		January 7, 2017	March 25, 2017	MBS, TBS, CBC
3	12		January 7, 2024	March 24, 2024	Tokyo MX, MBS
4	24	12	October 6, 2024	December 22, 2024	Tokyo MX, MBS
4	24	12	January 5, 2025	March 23, 2025	Tokyo MX, MBS

== Episodes ==
=== Season 1 (2011) ===
No. overall	No. in season	Title	Directed by	Written by	Storyboarded by	Original release date	English air date
1	1	"The Devil Resides in Human Souls"; Transliteration: "Akuma wa Hito no Kokoro ni Sumu" (Japanese: 悪魔は人の心に棲む)	Tensai Okamura	Ryōta Yamaguchi	Tensai Okamura	April 17, 2011	October 2, 2012
2	2	"Gehenna Gate"; Transliteration: "Gehena Gēto" (Japanese: 虚無界の門(ゲヘナゲート))	Tadahito Matsubayashi	Ryōta Yamaguchi	Tensai Okamura	April 24, 2011	October 13, 2012
3	3	"Brothers"; Transliteration: "Ani to Otōto" (Japanese: 兄と弟)	Shūji Miyahara	Natsuko Takahashi	Yuu Kou	May 1, 2011	October 20, 2012
4	4	"Garden of Amahara"; Transliteration: "Amahara no Niwa" (Japanese: 天空(アマハラ)の庭)	Junichi Sakata	Shinsuke Ōnishi	Junichi Sakata	May 8, 2011	October 27, 2012
5	5	"A Boy From the Cursed Temple"; Transliteration: "Tatari-dera no Ko" (Japanese: 祟り寺の子)	Toshimasa Kuroyanagi	Ryōta Yamaguchi	Toshimasa Kuroyanagi	May 15, 2011	November 3, 2012
6	6	"The Phantom Chef"; Transliteration: "Maboroshi no Ryōrinin" (Japanese: まぼろしの料理人)	Ryutarō Sakaguchi	Ryōta Yamaguchi	Tensai Okamura	May 22, 2011	November 10, 2012
7	7	"A Flock of Plovers"; Transliteration: "Tomochidori" (Japanese: 友千鳥)	Mamoru Enomoto	Natsuko Takahashi	Yumi Kamakura	May 29, 2011	November 17, 2012
8	8	"Now a Certain Man Was Sick..."; Transliteration: "Koko ni Yameru Mono Ari" (Japanese: 此(ここ)に病める者あり)	Yasutaka Yamamoto	Shinsuke Ōnishi	Yasutaka Yamamoto	June 5, 2011	November 24, 2012
9	9	"Memories"; Transliteration: "Omoide" (Japanese: おもひで)	Yoshiyuki Fujiwara	Shinsuke Ōnishi	Yoshiyuki Fujiwara	June 12, 2011	December 1, 2012
10	10	"Black Cat"; Transliteration: "Ketto Shī" (Japanese: 黒猫(ケットシー))	Junichi Sakata	Ikuko Takahashi	Junichi Sakata	June 19, 2011	December 8, 2012
11	11	"Demon of the Deep Seas"; Transliteration: "Shinkai no Akuma" (Japanese: 深海の悪魔)	Shinya Kawatsura	Shinsuke Ōnishi	Tonari Kamiigusa	June 26, 2011	December 18, 2012
12	12	"A Game of Tag"; Transliteration: "Onigokko" (Japanese: 鬼事(おにごっこ))	Tadahito Matsubayashi	Ikuko Takahashi	Tadahito Matsubayashi	July 3, 2011	December 25, 2012
13	13	"Proof"; Transliteration: "Shōmei" (Japanese: 証明)	Mamoru Enomoto	Ryōta Yamaguchi	Atsushi Takahashi	July 10, 2011	January 1, 2013
14	14	"A Fun Camping Trip"; Transliteration: "Tanoshii Kyanpu" (Japanese: 愉しいキャンプ)	Ryutarō Sakaguchi	Ikuko Takahashi	Kotaro Tamura	July 17, 2011	January 8, 2013
15	15	"Act of Kindness"; Transliteration: "Yasashii Koto" (Japanese: やさしい事)	Toshimasa Kuroyanagi	Ikuko Takahashi	Kazuma Fujimori	July 24, 2011	January 15, 2013
16	16	"The Wager"; Transliteration: "Kake" (Japanese: 賭)	Junichi Sakata	Shinsuke Ōnishi	Junichi Sakata	July 31, 2011	January 22, 2013
17	17	"Temptation"; Transliteration: "Yūwaku" (Japanese: 誘惑)	Shinpei Ezaki	Ryōta Yamaguchi	Yumi Kamakura	August 7, 2011	January 26, 2013
18	18	"Gale"; Transliteration: "Gufū" (Japanese: 颶風(グフウ))	Takahiro Harada	Ryōta Yamaguchi	Tensai Okamura	August 14, 2011	February 2, 2013
Alternate Ending Arc (Episodes disregarded in subsequent seasons)
19	19	"An Ordinary Day"; Transliteration: "Nandemonai Hi" (Japanese: なんでもない日)	Yoshiyuki Fujiwara	Ikuko Takahashi	Yoshiyuki Fujiwara	August 21, 2011	February 9, 2013
20	20	"Mask"; Transliteration: "Kamen" (Japanese: 假面(カメン))	Kazuhide Kondo	Shinsuke Ōnishi	Tensai Okamura	August 28, 2011	February 16, 2013
21	21	"The Secret Garden"; Transliteration: "Himitsu no Hanazono" (Japanese: 秘密の花園)	Ryutarō Sakaguchi	Ryōta Yamaguchi	Takuya Igarashi	September 4, 2011	February 23, 2013
22	22	"Demon Hunting"; Transliteration: "Akuma Gari" (Japanese: 悪魔狩り)	Shinpei Ezaki	Ryōta Yamaguchi	Atsushi Takahashi	September 11, 2011	March 2, 2013
23	23	"Truth"; Transliteration: "Shinjitsu" (Japanese: 真実)	Mamoru Enomoto	Ryōta Yamaguchi	Mamoru Sasaki	September 18, 2011	March 9, 2013
24	24	"Satan's Spawn"; Transliteration: "Satan no Ko" (Japanese: 魔神(サタン)の落胤(こ))	Toshimasa Kuroyanagi	Ryōta Yamaguchi	Tomohiko Itō	September 25, 2011	March 16, 2013
25	25	"Stop, Time"; Transliteration: "Toki yo Tomare" (Japanese: 時よ止まれ)	Tensai Okamura	Ryōta Yamaguchi	Tensai Okamura	October 2, 2011	March 23, 2013

=== Season 2: Kyoto Saga (2017) ===
No. overall	No. in saga	Title	Directed by	Written by	Storyboarded by	Original release date	English air date
26	1	"Small Beginnings"; Transliteration: "Kōshiranshō" (Japanese: 嚆矢濫觴)	Koichi Hatsumi & Shigeki Kawai	Toshiya Ōno	Koichi Hatsumi	January 7, 2017	May 18, 2025
27	2	"Strange Bedfellows"; Transliteration: "Goetsudoushū" (Japanese: 呉越同舟)	Shigeki Kawai	Seiko Takagi	Shigeki Kawai	January 14, 2017	May 25, 2025
28	3	"Suspicion Will Raise Bogies"; Transliteration: "Gishinanki" (Japanese: 疑心暗鬼)	Yū Aoki	Yuichiro Kido	Toshiyuki Fujisawa	January 21, 2017	June 1, 2025
29	4	"Act of Treachery"; Transliteration: "Haishinkigi" (Japanese: 背信棄義)	Ayako Kōno	Yūsuke Watanabe	Ayako Kōno	January 28, 2017	June 8, 2025
30	5	"Mysterious Connections"; Transliteration: "Aienkien" (Japanese: 合縁奇縁)	Matsuo Asami	Yūsuke Watanabe	Shigeki Kawai	February 4, 2017	June 15, 2025
31	6	"A Wolf in Sheep's Clothing"; Transliteration: "Menrihōshin" (Japanese: 綿裏包針)	Takeshi Yajima	Toshiya Ōno	Takeshi Yajima	February 11, 2017	June 22, 2025
32	7	"Like a Fire Burning Bright"; Transliteration: "Kienbanjō" (Japanese: 気炎万丈)	Ryūta Kawahara	Toshiya Ōno	Toshiyuki Fujisawa	February 18, 2017	June 29, 2025
33	8	"From Father to Son"; Transliteration: "Fushisōden" (Japanese: 父子相伝)	Yū Aoki	Seiko Takagi	Yū Aoki	February 25, 2017	July 20, 2025
34	9	"Through Thick and Thin"; Transliteration: "Setchūshōhaku" (Japanese: 雪中松柏)	Ayako Kōno	Toshiya Ōno	Michio Fukuda	March 4, 2017	July 27, 2025
35	10	"Unbowed and Unbroken"; Transliteration: "Futōfukutsu" (Japanese: 不撓不屈)	Kengo Matsumoto	Yūsuke Watanabe	Kengo Matsumoto	March 11, 2017	August 3, 2025
36	11	"Shine Bright as the Sun"; Transliteration: "Kōkisanzen" (Japanese: 光輝燦然)	Ken'ichi Kuhara & Shigeki Kawai	Seiko Takagi	Hisashi Saito & Shigeki Kawai	March 18, 2017	August 10, 2025
37	12	"Candid and Open"; Transliteration: "Kyoshintankai" (Japanese: 虚心坦懐)	Shigeki Kawai	Toshiya Ōno	Shigeki Kawai	March 25, 2017	August 17, 2025

=== Season 3: Shimane Illuminati Saga (2024) ===
No. overall	No. in saga	Title	Directed by	Written by	Storyboarded by	Original release date	English air date
38	1	"The World's Astir"; Transliteration: "Zawameku Sekai" (Japanese: ざわめく世界)	Junichi Fujise	Toshiya Ōno	Daisuke Yoshida	January 7, 2024	August 24, 2025
39	2	"Where Secrets Are"; Transliteration: "Himitsu no Arika" (Japanese: 秘密の在り処)	Jungmook Lee	Toshiya Ōno	Satoshi Nishimura	January 14, 2024	August 31, 2025
40	3	"True Cross Academy Festival"; Transliteration: "Seijūji Gakuen-sai" (Japanese: 正十字学園祭)	Norifumi Udono	Toshiya Ōno	Satoshi Nishimura	January 21, 2024	September 7, 2025
41	4	"Insider"; Transliteration: "Naitsū-sha" (Japanese: 内通者)	Erika Toshimitsu	Toshiya Ōno	Satoshi Nishimura	January 28, 2024	September 14, 2025
42	5	"Destiny"; Transliteration: "Unmei" (Japanese: 運命)	Junichi Fujise	Seiko Takagi	Satoshi Nishimura	February 4, 2024	September 21, 2025
43	6	"I Can't Rely on Anyone"; Transliteration: "Mō Dare mo Tayorenai" (Japanese: もう誰も頼れない)	Hidetoshi Watanabe	Kakuzō Nanmanji	Satoshi Nishimura	February 11, 2024	September 28, 2025
44	7	"Hesitation"; Transliteration: "Mayoi" (Japanese: 迷い)	Jungmook Lee	Toshiya Ōno	Satoshi Nishimura	February 18, 2024	October 5, 2025
45	8	"Determination"; Transliteration: "Kakugo" (Japanese: 覚悟)	Makoto Ōwada	Seiko Takagi	Satoshi Nishimura	February 25, 2024	October 12, 2025
46	9	"Help Me"; Transliteration: "Tasukete" (Japanese: 助けて)	Erika Toshimitsu	Kakuzō Nanmanji	Satoshi Nishimura	March 3, 2024	October 19, 2025
47	10	"Friends"; Transliteration: "Nakama" (Japanese: 仲間)	Norifumi Udono	Toshiya Ōno	Ida–Dyne	March 10, 2024	October 19, 2025
48	11	"Pink Spider"; Transliteration: "Pinku Supaidā" (Japanese: ピンクスパイダー)	Jungmook Lee	Seiko Takagi	Ida–Dyne	March 17, 2024	November 2, 2025
49	12	"Hidden True Feelings"; Transliteration: "Kakusareta Hon'ne" (Japanese: 隠された本音)	Chika Nenbe	Kakuzō Nanmanji	Junichi Sakata	March 24, 2024	November 2, 2025

=== Season 4: Beyond the Snow / The Blue Night Sagas (2024–25) ===
No. overall	No. in saga	Title	Directed by	Written by	Storyboarded by	Original release date	English air date
Beyond the Snow Saga
50	1	"Ambition"; Transliteration: "Yabō" (Japanese: 野望)	Junichi Fujise	Toshiya Ōno	Satoshi Nishimura	October 6, 2024	November 9, 2025
51	2	"Distress"; Transliteration: "Kunō" (Japanese: 苦悩)	Erika Toshimitsu	Seiko Takagi	Satoshi Nishimura	October 13, 2024	November 16, 2025
52	3	"Hometown"; Transliteration: "Furusato" (Japanese: 故郷)	Jungmook Lee	Kakuzō Nanmanji	Masatoshi Hakada	October 20, 2024	November 23, 2025
53	4	"Goodbye to You"; Transliteration: "Sayonara Anata" (Japanese: さよならあなた)	Norifumi Udono	Yūsuke Watanabe	Satoshi Nishimura	October 27, 2024	November 30, 2025
54	5	"As If Begging for Tears"; Transliteration: "Nake to Bakari ni" (Japanese: 泣けとばかりに)	Kenya Ueno	Kakuzō Nanmanji	Junichi Sakata	November 3, 2024	December 7, 2025
55	6	"Awakening"; Transliteration: "Keichitsu" (Japanese: 啓蟄)	Junichi Fujise	Seiko Takagi	Hiroaki Yoshikawa	November 10, 2024	December 14, 2025
56	7	"Variant Leaves"; Transliteration: "Ikeiyō" (Japanese: 異形葉)	Erika Toshimitsu	Toshiya Ōno	Satoshi Nishimura	November 17, 2024	December 21, 2025
57	8	"Happy (Merry Xmas) Birthday!"; Transliteration: "Happī (Meri Kuri) Bāsudē!" (Japanese: ハッピー（メリクリ）バースデー！)	Yūsuke Shintani	Yūsuke Watanabe	Satoshi Nishimura	November 24, 2024	January 4, 2026
58	9	"Congratulations"; Transliteration: "Kotobuki" (Japanese: 寿)	Norifumi Udono	Kakuzō Nanmanji	Hiroaki Yoshikawa	December 1, 2024	January 11, 2026
59	10	"In the Falling Snow"; Transliteration: "Chiru Yuki no Naka de" (Japanese: 散る雪の中で)	Jungmook Lee	Seiko Takagi	Hiroyuki Yano	December 8, 2024	January 18, 2026
60	11	"Beyond the Snow"; Transliteration: "Yuki no Hate" (Japanese: 雪の果て)	Erika Toshimitsu & Jungmook Lee	Toshiya Ōno	Junichi Sakata	December 15, 2024	January 25, 2026
61	12	"Parting"; Transliteration: "Ketsubetsu" (Japanese: 決別)	Yūsuke Shintani	Toshiya Ōno	Satoshi Nishimura	December 22, 2024	February 1, 2026
The Blue Night Saga
62	1	"Shiro and Yuri"; Transliteration: "Shīrō to Yuri" (Japanese: 獅郎とユリ)	Junichi Fujise	Toshiya Ōno	Hiroyuki Yano	January 5, 2025	TBA
63	2	"Truth"; Transliteration: "Shinjitsu" (Japanese: 真実)	Jungmook Lee & Yūsuke Shintani	Kakuzō Nanmanji	Taizo Yoshida	January 12, 2025	TBA
64	3	"Alone"; Transliteration: "Hitoribotchi" (Japanese: 一人ぼっち)	Norifumi Udono	Seiko Takagi	Satoshi Nishimura	January 19, 2025	TBA
65	4	"Satan Awakening"; Transliteration: "Satan Kakusei" (Japanese: サタン覚醒)	Erika Toshimitsu	Yūsuke Watanabe	Junichi Sakata	January 26, 2025	TBA
66	5	"More Important Than the Body"; Transliteration: "Karada Yori Daijinamono" (Japanese: 身体より大事なもの)	Yūsuke Shintani	Daito Inaba	Hiroyuki Yano	February 2, 2025	TBA
67	6	"If It Weren't for Me"; Transliteration: "Ore Sae Inakereba" (Japanese: 俺さえいなければ)	Junichi Fujise	Kakuzō Nanmanji	Satoshi Nishimura	February 9, 2025	TBA
68	7	"The Night Before"; Transliteration: "Zen'ya" (Japanese: 前夜)	Jungmook Lee, Yūsuke Shintani & Erika Toshimitsu	Seiko Takagi	Junichi Sakata	February 16, 2025	TBA
69	8	"The Blue Night"; Transliteration: "Aoi Yoru" (Japanese: 青い夜)	Norifumi Udono	Daito Inaba	Satoshi Nishimura	February 23, 2025	TBA
70	9	"Fight to the Death"; Transliteration: "Shitō" (Japanese: 死闘)	Erika Toshimitsu	Yūsuke Watanabe	Satoshi Nishimura	March 2, 2025	TBA
71	10	"Light"; Transliteration: "Hikari" (Japanese: 光)	Yūsuke Shintani & Jungmook Lee	Kakuzō Nanmanji	Junichi Sakata	March 9, 2025	TBA
72	11	"Promise"; Transliteration: "Yakusoku" (Japanese: 約束)	Junichi Fujise	Seiko Takagi	Hiroyuki Yano	March 16, 2025	TBA
73	12	"Thank You"; Transliteration: "Arigatō" (Japanese: ありがとう)	Kanji Wakabayashi	Toshiya Ōno	Satoshi Nishimura	March 23, 2025	TBA

== OVAs ==
No.	Title	Directed by	Written by	Storyboarded by	Original release date
1	"Runaway Kuro"; Transliteration: "Kuro no Iede" (Japanese: クロの家出)	Hideaki Oba	Ikuko Takahashi	Yumi Kamakura	December 27, 2012
Kuro searches for a new owner after Rin teases him by threatening to eat all of his food, since cats have a high sensitivity to heat. Kuro searches for Father Fujimoto and along the way runs into Rin's classmates, teachers, and friends. Kuro finds Father Fujimoto's ghost sitting on his grave. Finally, Rin comes and apologizes for teasing him and they head home to the academy.
2	"Snake and Poison"; Transliteration: "Hebi to Doku" (Japanese: 蛇と毒)	Shinichi Tōkairin	Yūsuke Watanabe	Takahiko Kyōgoku	April 4, 2017
The story centers around Mamushi Hojo and Juzo Shima when they were students studying at the True Cross Academy.
3	"Spy Game"; Transliteration: "Supai・Gēmu" (Japanese: スパイ・ゲーム)	Shigeki Kawai	Toshiya Ōno	Shigeki Kawai	October 4, 2017
Mephisto tested Renzo's abilities as a spy by giving him various tasks.
