= Brian Beacock =

American actor (born 1966)

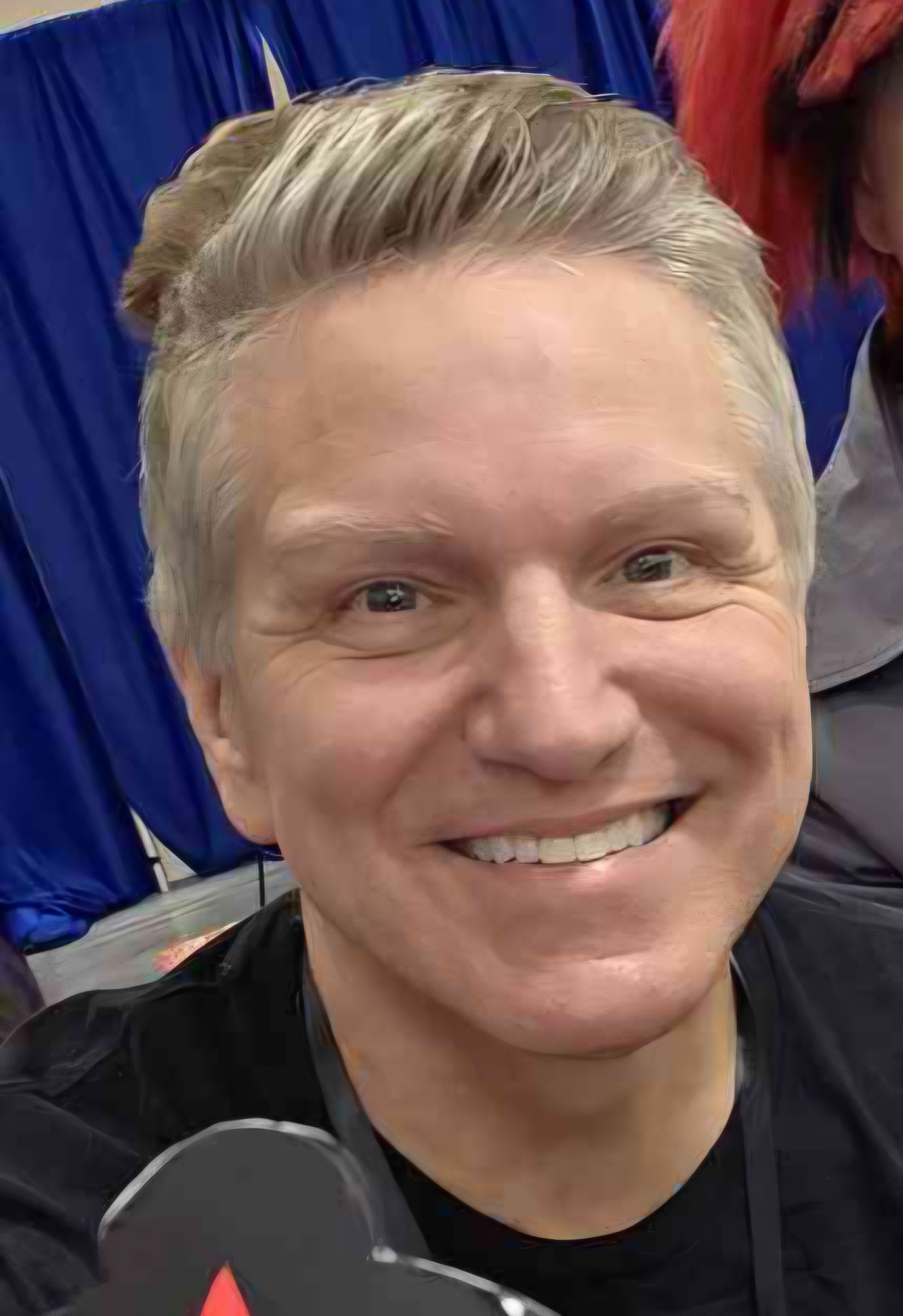
- Brian Beacock at Akaicon 2026
- Born: Brian Keith Beacock; March 29, 1966 (age 60); Contra Costa, California
- Other name: Donn A. Nordean
- Occupation: Actor
- Years active: 1988–present

Brian Keith Beacock (born March 29, 1966) is an American film, television and voice actor in English-dubbed anime and video games.

He is best known for playing Byonko in Zatch Bell, Takato Matsuki in Digimon Tamers, Yumichika Ayasegawa from Bleach, Yamato Delgado in Battle B-Daman, and Monokuma, the main antagonist and mascot of the Danganronpa franchise.

== Filmography ==
=== Anime ===
- Battle B-Daman – Yamato Delgado, Joshua
- Beastars - Dom
- Bleach – Yumichika Ayasegawa
- Bleach: Thousand-Year Blood War – Yumichika Ayasegawa
- Blood Lad – Shamkid
- Blue Dragon – Andropov
- Blue Exorcist – Renzo Shima
- Bobobo-bo Bo-bobo – Dengaku Man, Additional Voices (credited as Donn A. Nordean)
- Boruto: Naruto Next Generations - Chojuro
- Bungo Stray Dogs – Ryūnosuke Akutagawa
- Code Geass – Rivalz Cardemonde
- Digimon Tamers – Takato Matsuki, Gallantmon, Gallantmon Crimson Mode (shared with Steve Blum)
- Digimon Frontier – Narrator (Replaced the Original Melissa Fahn Episode 43-50)/Bokomon
- Digimon Fusion – Gravimon
- Digimon Data Squad – Agumon/GeoGreymon/RizeGreymon/ShineGreymon
- Doraemon – Sneech (Suneo Honekawa)
- Dragon Ball Super – Krillin (Bang Zoom! Dub)
- Durarara!! – Walker Yumasaki
- Duel Masters – Aizen, Boy George (Season 3)
- Idaten Jump – Arthur, Kiyoshi (of the Four Kings), Jero, Seiji
- JoJo's Bizarre Adventure: Diamond is Unbreakable – Shigekiyo "Shigechi" Yangu
- Kimi ni Todoke – Yoshiyuki "Zen" Arai
- Kuroko's Basketball - Shōichi Imayoshi
- Mix Master: Final Force – Ninom, Blue Fox (credited as Donn A. Nordean)
- Naruto – Yashamaru, Sakon and Ukon, White Zetsu, Additional Voices
- Naruto: Shippuden – Chōjūrō, Yashamaru, Sakon and Ukon
- Nura: Rise of the Yokai Clan series – Jiro Shima, Satori (credited as Donn A. Nordean)
- One-Punch Man - Geryuganshoop
- Sailor Moon R – Seijuuro Ginga/Ail (Viz Media dub)
- Sword Art Online: Alicization - Takeru Higa
- Tenkai Knights – Mr. White, Mr. Black (Ep. 42)
- Toradora! – Kouji Haruta
- Vivy: Fluorite Eye's Song – M
- Zatch Bell! – Byonko, Jobin, Additional Voices

=== Video games ===
- Bleach: Shattered Blade – Yumichika Ayasegawa
- Bleach: The 3rd Phantom – Yumichika Ayasegawa, D-Roy Linker (credited as Donn A Nordean)
- Danganronpa: Trigger Happy Havoc – Monokuma
- Danganronpa 2: Goodbye Despair – Monokuma
- Danganronpa 2×2 – Monokuma
- Danganronpa Another Episode: Ultra Despair Girls – Monokuma
- Danganronpa V3: Killing Harmony – Monokuma, Monosuke
- Digimon Story: Time Stranger – additional voices
- Digimon World Data Squad – Agumon/GeoGreymon, RiseGreymon
- Elsword – Raven
- Fire Emblem Heroes – Luthier
- Naruto: Ninja Council 3 – Sakon
- Naruto: Ultimate Ninja 3 – Sakon and Ukon
- Romancing SaGa 2: Revenge of the Seven – Siero/Mole
- Seven Samurai 20XX – Tay
- Xenoblade Chronicles X – Additional voices
- Zatch Bell! Mamodo Fury – Byonko

=== Television ===
- Based on an Untrue Story (1993) – Television movie; Reporter #2
- Late Night with Conan O'Brien (2000) – Axl in 'White Trash Wins Lotto'
- Gary & Mike (2001) – Nafe; episode: "Road Rage"
- Gormiti (2008) – Nick Tripp
- The Rerun Show (2002) – 6 episodes
- Passions (2005) – Store clerk; 2 episodes
- CSI: Crime Scene Investigation (2004) – Irv; episode: "Ch-Ch-Changes"
- Playing It Straight (2004) – Troubadour; 6 episodes
- Imagination Movers (2011) - Al the Genie; episode: "Wishful Thinking"

=== Film ===
- American Slices (2000) – Short movie; Gabriel
- Globehunters: An Around the World in 80 Days Adventure (2000) - Trevor (voice)
- Circuit (2001) – Suspect/Drag Queen
- Mulholland Drive (2001) – Studio Singer
- Buying The Cow (2002) – Alex
- Digimon Tamers: Battle of Adventurers - Takato Matsuda (voice)
- Digimon Tamers: Runaway Locomon - Takato Matsuda (voice)
- Digimon Frontier: Island of Lost Digimon - Bokomon (voice)
- Paprika (2006) – Kei Himuro and Kuga
- Blue Exorcist: The Movie (2012) – Renzo Shima (voice)
- Monster Hunter: Legends of the Guild (2021) – as Navid (voice)
- Sailor Moon Eternal (2021) – Helios/Pegasus

=== Other ===
- AficionadosChris (YouTube) – Takato Matsuki

== Awards and honors ==
Brian shared the 2005 RTS Television Award with Jamie Forsyth for Best Music – Original Title Music for "Playing It Straight". At the 2014 National Academy of Video Game Trade Reviewers (NAVGTR) awards, Beacock was nominated for Performance in a Comedy, Supporting for his work on Danganronpa: Trigger Happy Havoc.
