= List of Blue Exorcist characters =

A selection of the characters from the series

The fictional characters from the manga series Blue Exorcist were created by Kazue Kato. The story revolves around Rin Okumura, a teenager who discovers he is the son of the god demon Satan, born from a human woman and the inheritor of Satan's powers. When Rin's guardian dies while fighting Satan, Rin decides to become an exorcist in order to defeat his father. Entering into the True Cross Academy to learn how to fight demons, Rin meets several other exorcist apprentices whom he starts to bond with. Critical reception to the characters has been positive for their traits and interactions.

== Main characters ==
=== Rin Okumura ===
Voiced by: Daisuke Namikawa (vomic), Nobuhiko Okamoto (anime) (Japanese); Bryce Papenbrook (English)
Portrayed by: Ryou Kimura

Rin Okumura (奥村 燐, Okumura Rin) is the fifteen-year-old son of Satan, born to a human woman and inheriting his father's demonic powers, which were sealed at birth into the sword Kurikara (倶利伽羅) by Mephisto Pheles.^{[ch. 1]} This allows Rin to live a human life with his twin brother Yukio and foster father Shiro Fujimoto until the seal breaks, triggering Satan's attempt to drag him back to Gehenna and resulting in Shiro's death. Enrolling at True Cross Academy under Mephisto, Rin trains as an exorcist to master his flames and confront Satan, striving to earn Yukio's respect and prove his humanity.^{[ch. 2]}

Drawing Kurikara transforms Rin into his demonic form, unleashing destructive blue flames that initially overwhelm him.^{[ch. 9]} With training from the spirit Kongo Ucchusma, he gains control over his power,^{[ch. 32]} while his familiar, the two-tailed cat-sìth Kuro, aids him.^{[ch. 8]} After Yukio awakens Satan's power in his own eyes and attacks Rin, the latter's demonic side briefly takes over, nearly killing his allies before he regains control—an event that permanently shifts his appearance closer to Satan's.

=== Yukio Okumura ===
Voiced by: Ryuichi Kijima (vomic), Jun Fukuyama (anime) (Japanese); Johnny Yong Bosch (English)
Portrayed by: Kimito Totani

Yukio Okumura (奥村 雪男, Okumura Yukio) is Rin's fraternal twin brother. Though initially believed to share Satan's power, Yukio was born fully human due to his frail body, with Rin inheriting all of their father's demonic traits.^{[ch. 1]} However, a spiritual wound from Rin at birth granted Yukio permanent awareness of demons. Trained secretly as an exorcist since childhood by Shiro Fujimoto to protect Rin, Yukio becomes a prodigy, achieving the rank of Meister in both Dragoon and Doctor classes while still a first-year student at True Cross Academy, where he teaches Anti-Demon Pharmacology.^{[ch. 2]}

Despite his early affection for Rin, Yukio grows resentful, blaming him for Fujimoto's death and envying his demonic power. Though he later reconciles somewhat, he fears Rin's recklessness will unleash his demonic nature. During a battle with Todo, Yukio awakens latent flames in his eyes—revealing his own partial inheritance of Satan's power—which drives him to uncover the truth of his birth. Convinced Fujimoto only raised him as a weapon, he joins the Illuminati in a mix of obsession and jealousy.

In the anime, it is changed so that he has the powers of Satan.

== Exorcists ==
=== Shiemi Moriyama ===
Voiced by: Kana Hanazawa (Japanese); Christine Marie Cabanos (English)
Portrayed by: Ari Nakajima

Shiemi Moriyama (杜山 しえみ, Moriyama Shiemi) is the daughter of an exorcist shop owner who spent her youth confined to her home, tending gardens with her grandmother. After Rin and Yukio exorcise a life-draining demon following her grandmother's death, she enrolls at True Cross Academy to become an exorcist.^{[ch. 3]} Initially struggling academically due to using homemade plant names, she improves after learning proper terminology. Though shy at first, she gradually befriends Ryuji, Konekomaru, Renzo, and even the initially hostile Izumo.

As a talented Tamer, Shiemi commands a Greenman spirit capable of producing healing herbs and plant-based barriers with exceptional stamina. She reconciles with Rin during the Kyoto mission after initial distress over his hidden demonic nature.^{[ch. 26]} While initially confused about romantic feelings due to her sheltered upbringing, she later realizes her love for Rin after nearly losing him.

=== Ryuji Suguro ===
Voiced by: Kazuya Nakai (Japanese); Kyle Hebert (English)
Portrayed by: Yūki Tomotsune

Ryuji Suguro (勝呂 竜士, Suguro Ryūji), nicknamed "Bon" (坊), is a hot-tempered but diligent student who ranks first in his class. As heir to Kyoto's destroyed Cursed Temple, he vows to defeat Satan and rebuild his family's legacy, resenting his father Tatsuma for perceived failures.^{[ch. 4]} Initially rejecting Rin after learning his demonic heritage, Ryuji later reconciles after realizing his anger stemmed from Rin's lack of trust in their friendship.^{[ch. 26]}

During the Impure King crisis, Ryuji inherits the phoenix-like familiar Karura from his father, using its powerful flames to create protective barriers against the demon's miasma.^{[ch. 27]} Currently an Esquire training for dual Meister ranks in Aria and Dragoon, he becomes Lightning's apprentice after losing his sense of purpose.

=== Renzo Shima ===
Voiced by: Kōji Yusa (Japanese); Brian Beacock (English)
Portrayed by: Kazuki Watanabe

Renzo Shima (志摩 廉造, Shima Renzō) presents himself as a carefree, woman-obsessed student—a persona masking his true capabilities. The pink-haired (naturally black-haired) Kyoto Temple orphan remains fiercely loyal to childhood friends Bon and Konekomaru. He quickly accepts Rin's demonic heritage, finding exclusion too troublesome. Though flippant about his studies, he seriously trains with his khakkhara staff to become an Aria Meister.

Renzo's facade shatters when he reveals unexpected power to summon high-level demons, though the effort exhausts him. Initially exposed as an Illuminati spy, his brother later claims Renzo was Mephisto's double agent all along. While rejoining his friends, his true allegiance remains ambiguous—his playful demeanor persistently obscuring whether he ever truly abandoned the Illuminati cause.

=== Konekomaru Miwa ===
Voiced by: Yuki Kaji (Japanese); Miki Moran (English)
Portrayed by: Jun Muruyama

Konekomaru Miwa (三輪 子猫丸, Miwa Konekomaru) is a timid but brilliant individual, able to come up with complex strategies in a short window of time. He is very loyal to Ryuji and Renzo, as they had grown up together at the same Temple in Kyoto. He is kind to everyone, but it takes a long time for him to reconcile with Rin after discovering his secret, despite seeing his true character.^{[ch. 26]} He is an orphan and the surviving head of the Miwa family. He plans to achieve the Meister in Aria. In the anime, a crow demon took advantage of Konekomaru's fear of Rin and possessed him, before Rin is able to save Konekomaru.

=== Izumo Kamiki ===
Voiced by: Eri Kitamura (Japanese); Kira Buckland (English)
Portrayed by: Anna Hachimine.

Izumo Kamiki (神木 出雲, Kamiki Izumo) comes from a lineage of Inari shrine maidens and excels academically, though her tsundere personality makes her difficult to approach. Only her childhood friend Noriko Paku broke through her defensive shell.^{[ch. 5]} Despite her pride, she becomes the first classmate to accept Rin after learning his heritage.

A talented Tamer-in-training, Izumo commands two ancestral fox spirits. Her painful past reveals the Kamiki family's pact with a nine-tailed fox demon—a burden her mother bore to protect her. Tricked by the Illuminati into becoming the fox's next vessel to save her sister Tsukumo, Izumo nearly sacrifices herself until her mother's final act of love breaks the cycle. This trauma teaches Izumo to value her academy friendships and move forward from self-pity after learning Tsukumo found happiness elsewhere.

== True Cross Order ==
The True Cross Order (正十字騎士團, Sei Jūji Kishidan) is the main organization of Exorcists within the series, a global exorcist institution that is controlled by the Vatican. The True Cross Order has roots in Christianity, and was founded by medieval Christian knights. Originally established as a military order, the organization's centuries-long campaign against demons has allowed it to discover and develop new exorcism techniques from all around the globe. As of today, the Order is the largest and most powerful exorcist organization in the world. Given that they have defended mankind from demons for roughly 2000 years, the Order trains exorcists. In addition, the Order takes it upon itself to heal humans who have been harmed by demons, as well as to proactively investigate possible demonic activity. An additional mission of the True Cross Order is to find and destroy human organizations that support demons and demonic activity, such as Demon Eaters or the Illuminati.

=== Mephisto Pheles ===
Voiced by: Hiroshi Kamiya (Japanese); Sam Riegel (English)
Portrayed by: Yūya Nakahara

Mephisto Pheles (メフィスト・フェレス, Mefisuto Feresu), publicly known as Johann Faust V (ヨハン·ファウスト第五, Yohan Fausuto Daigo), serves as True Cross Academy's eccentric chairman. Despite his flamboyant otaku persona and penny-pinching habits, he wields significant influence as an Honorary Knight. He spares Rin after Shiro Fujimoto's death, enrolling him instead of executing him per orders.^{[ch. 1]}

As the demon king Samael, "King of Time", Mephisto ranks second only to Lucifer in Gehenna's hierarchy. His temporal powers manifest through reality-warping abilities like transformation and spatial manipulation. While claiming to pursue peace between Assiah and Gehenna, his true agenda remains ambiguous—he subtly manipulates events around Rin while maintaining his human facade. His German chants ("Eins, zwei, drei") and fourth-wall-breaking philosophical musings hint at his ancient, calculating nature beneath the playful exterior.

His name is derived from Mephistopheles, a demon from the German legend of Faust.

=== Shiro Fujimoto ===
Voiced by: Yoshito Yasuhara (vomic), Keiji Fujiwara (2011 series), Hiroaki Hirata (Kyoto Saga onwards), Daisuke Namikawa (young) (Japanese); Kirk Thornton (English)
Portrayed by: Yasuhiko Imai

Shiro Fujimoto (藤本 獅郎, Fujimoto Shirō) was a Catholic priest, Paladin of the True Cross Order, and foster father to Rin and Yukio Okumura. As the organization's strongest exorcist (holding Meister ranks in five classes), he wielded the demon-slaying sword Kurikara alongside his familiar Kuro, a cait sith.^{[ch. 24]} After sealing Rin's demonic powers at birth, he raised both twins as his own.

Shiro's origins trace back to Section 13's cloning experiments—he was an Azazel clone created as a potential vessel for Lucifer. Having escaped the facility with Yuri Egin, he later fell in love with her despite initially rejecting her feelings. His unique ability to resist Satan's possession ultimately failed when Rin's emotional outburst weakened his resolve, allowing Satan to take control.^{[ch. 2]} In his final act, Shiro regained momentary control to commit suicide, preventing Satan's plans while fracturing his sons' relationship.^{[ch. 1]}

=== Shura Kirigakure ===
Voiced by: Rina Satō (Japanese); Wendee Lee (English)

Shura Kirigakure (霧隠 シュラ, Kirigakure Shura) is an Upper First Class Exorcist who trained under Shiro Fujimoto, achieving Meister rank in Knight. Her signature technique summons a demonic sword from a chest tattoo by chanting "Devour the Eight Princesses, slay the Serpent". Despite her revealing attire and carefree demeanor—marked by heavy drinking and chronic lateness—she possesses formidable combat skills rivaling demon kings like Amaimon.^{[ch. 10]}

Bound by her ancestor's pact with a snake deity, Shura faces an early death at 30 unless she produces an heir. Initially assigned to eliminate Rin as part of her investigation into Mephisto's activities, she instead honors Shiro's legacy by training Rin to control his powers. Her true mission involves monitoring Mephisto's suspicious activities within the Japanese branch.

=== Igor Neuhaus ===
Voiced by: Ryōtarō Okiayu (Japanese); Patrick Seitz (English)

Igor Neuhaus (イゴール・ネイガウス, Igōru Neigaus) is an Upper First Class Exorcist as well as lecturer in the academy, who obtained the titles of Tamer, Doctor and Aria. He wears an eyepatch over his left eye, and has Aria incantations and magic circles tattooed on both arms. He had a run-in with Satan when he was younger, which robbed him of his family and the sight in his left eye, which is why he holds immense hatred for Satan and demons that are related to Satan. Yet ironically, he is extremely loyal to Mephisto, willing to listen to his every command, which is why he stopped his attacks on Rin prior to the latter becoming an Exorcist.

In the anime, he ends up the suspect for the Masked Man attacks on those allied with Rin; however, the truth is much worse. "Someone" used a demon to bring his wife, Michelle, back to life, and her mental instability at the horrible memory of the Blue Night caused her to attack anything related to Satan, even the friends of his sons.

=== Arthur Auguste Angel ===
Voiced by: Daisuke Ono (Japanese); David Vincent (English)

Arthur Auguste Angel (アーサー・オーギュスト・エンジェル, Āsā Ōgyusuto Enjeru) is the newly appointed Paladin. He was ordered by the Grigori to interrogate Mephisto and capture Rin as evidence. Arthur is a respected Exorcist with dubious ethics, as said by Shura to be like a saint on the outside but really a devil inside. He uses the sentient demon sword Caliburn. When speaking, Caliburn shows extreme affection towards him and talks like a love-struck teenage girl. Arthur has a great dislike of Rin (simply because of his lineage), being annoyed that the son of Satan destroyed the Impure King. Arthur is a terrible liar, and hinted to be somewhat of an idiot (by Shura) since he always lets Lightning do the thinking for him. In the spin-off, Salaryman Exorcist, it is shown that Arthur has an immense distaste for dirty objects getting near him and draws Caliburn to eliminate the dirt. In the anime, Arthur is replaced by Yukio when Ernst takes over the Vatican.

=== Nemu Takara ===
Voiced by: Tsubasa Yonaga, Gō Inoue (puppet) (Japanese); Brianne Siddall (English)

Nemu Takara (宝 ねむ, Takara Nemu) is a quiet and mysterious character that carries around a sock puppet. He uses ventriloquism to talk and he is usually rude. Although initially posing as an Esquire, Nemu's powers are revealed to be equivalent to that of an upper first class Exorcist. He is hired by Mephisto as a 'moderator' for the cram students. It is suggested Nemu's puppet is sentient and is actually the one controlling his body, since it was telling Nemu to calm down; adding to this is that Nemu's eyes are usually seen closed, suggesting that he is in a trance.

=== Lewin Light ===
Voiced by: Tomokazu Seki (Japanese); Sean Chiplock (English)

Lewin Light (ルーイン･ライト, Rūin Raito), better known as Lightning (ライトニング, Raitoningu), is an Arc Knight and an Exorcist of the True Cross Order. He is also Arthur's partner and right-hand man.

== Other characters ==
=== Amaimon ===
Voiced by: Tetsuya Kakihara (Japanese); Darrel Guilbeau (English)
Portrayed by: Yūki Tamaki

Amaimon (アマイモン), the Earth King and seventh-strongest of the Eight Demon Kings, wields control over land and earthquakes. This eccentric son of Satan develops an obsession with Rin after their first battle, contrasting his initial disinterest. When defeated in the anime, he's transformed into a talking green hamster confined to Mephisto's office. The manga depicts Mephisto restraining him in another dimension until his violent urges subside.

Allowed to attend True Cross Academy as Mephisto's "nephew", Amaimon joins Shiemi's class while maintaining his childish temperament—easily offended by laughter or neglect, yet constantly sucking on lollipops. His oddities include mentioning an occult-obsessed cousin who collects human eyes. Though destructive by nature, he begrudgingly complies with temporary pacifism to remain in the human world.

=== Saburota Todo ===
Voiced by: Kazuhiro Yamaji, Junichi Suwabe (youth) (Japanese); Ray Chase (English)

Saburota Todo (藤堂 三郎太, Tōdō Saburōta) is a former Upper Second Class exorcist, teacher at the Exorcist Cram School, and Director of the Saishinbu, an area of the True Cross Academy containing dangerous artifacts including Right and Left Eyes of the Impure King. He is sly and skillfully manipulates others to achieve his still-unknown goals. After stealing the Left Eye of the Impure King, he officially left the True Cross Order. He can take control of demons and use their abilities. He seems to be interested in Yukio's development due to him being a son of Satan, and even attempted to convince him to kill Rin. After gaining Karura's power, his physical appearance became younger.

=== Satan ===
Voiced by: Keiji Fujiwara (2011 series), Tatsuhisa Suzuki (Beyond the Snow Saga onwards) (Japanese); Kirk Thornton (2011 series), Mick Lauer (Beyond the Snow Saga onwards) (English)

Satan (サタン), lord of demons, seeks dominion over Assiah. Originally a spirit called Rinka without ego, he developed consciousness after possessing a clone from the Asylum facility. Through Yuri Egin's influence and Shiro Fujimoto's intervention, he evolved into the arrogant being now known as Satan, viewing himself as a god above all life.^{[ch. 1]}

Father to both demon kings (Mephisto, Amaimon, Lucifer) and human-demon hybrids (Rin and Yukio), Satan's obsession with Yuri led to his temporary abandonment of conquest. After the Order captured and experimented on his weakened form, he later attempts to use Shiro and Yukio as vessels to manifest in Assiah. The anime adaptation reveals his genuine affection for Yuri and their shared dream of human-demon coexistence, suggesting their sons might fulfill this vision.

=== Reiji Shiratori ===
Voiced by: Kentarō Itō (Japanese); Derek Stephen Prince (English)

Reiji Shiratori (白鳥 零二, Shiratori Reiji) is the leader of the delinquent gang. He attacks Rin after Astaroth, King of Rot takes over his body. Astaroth was exorcised by Shiro Fujimoto and Reiji has not been seen since. Reiji was a delinquent gang leader and likes troubling others. Due to his evilness he was further possessed by Astaroth, the King of Rot. He is very sadistic. In contrast with his delinquent personality, Reiji comes from a rather rich family. Later on, it is revealed that he too attends True Cross Academy as a student.

=== Tsukumo Kamiki ===
Tsukumo Kamiki (神木月雲, Kamiki Tsukumo) is Izumo's younger sister, first introduced at age four. After their mother's possession by a nine-tailed fox, both girls were taken to an Illuminati facility under false pretenses of protection. When agent Maria Yoshida discovered plans to experiment on Tsukumo, she secretly arranged the girl's adoption with Nemu Takara's relatives - a family under True Cross Order protection.

Five years later, now nine-year-old Tsukumo appears happy and safe, but no longer remembers Izumo when her sister attempts to reconnect. The separation leaves Izumo heartbroken, though Tsukumo's safety is confirmed.

=== Yuri Egin ===
Voiced by: Megumi Hayashibara (Japanese); Cherami Leigh (English)

Yuri Egin (ユリ・エギン), mother of Rin and Yukio Okumura, was a compassionate Lower Second Class Exorcist specializing as a Tamer. Unlike her peers, she refused combat roles, preferring to care for demons at the Demon Farm. Her kindness profoundly impacted both Shiro Fujimoto—whose heart she softened despite his initial rejection of her love—and the spirit Rinka, who later became Satan.

After Satan possessed a clone from Section 13, Yuri became his caretaker, maintaining faith in his redemption even as he transformed into a megalomaniacal being. Their relationship produced twin sons, though their attempted escape from the Order led to Yuri's capture and branding as a witch. She defiantly protected her pregnancy despite persecution. The anime adaptation emphasizes her belief in demon-human coexistence, showing how her empathy allowed Satan's initial possession and their tragic romance.

=== Kuro ===
Voiced by: Ayahi Takagaki (Japanese); Stephanie Sheh (English)

Kuro (クロ) is a two-tailed cat sith who serves as Rin Okumura's familiar, previously belonging to Shiro Fujimoto. This sacred black cat can transform into a powerful nekomata and communicate telepathically with demons. Originally worshipped as a guardian deity by silk farmers, Kuro went berserk when forgotten by humans until Fujimoto tamed him.

After Fujimoto's death, Kuro briefly rampages at True Cross Academy until Rin calms him, forming a new bond. As Rin's familiar, Kuro retains his role as one of the academy's guardians. His dual tails and ancient origins mark him as a spiritually significant being, bridging the human and demon worlds.

=== Lucifer ===
Voiced by: Koki Uchiyama (Japanese); Griffin Puatu (English)

Lucifer (ルシフェル, Rushiferu), the King of Light, is the strongest of the Eight Demon Kings as well as commander-in-chief of a powerful organization, the Illuminati.

=== Michael Gedoin ===
Voiced by: Nobuyuki Hiyama (Japanese); Alejandro Saab (English)

Michael Gedoin is the head of Illuminati's Far East laboratory.

== Anime-only characters ==
=== Ernst Frederik Egin ===
Voiced by: Toshihiko Miki (Japanese); Dave Mallow (English)

Ernst Frederick Egin (エルンスト・フレデリク・エギン, Erunsuto Furederiku Egin) is an anime-exclusive character, Yuri Egin's father and Rin/Yukio's grandfather. He ordered Yuri's execution upon discovering her pregnancy with Satan's children. After being possessed by Satan during the Blue Night incident, his hatred for demons deepened. As a Grigori member, he opposed Mephisto's affiliation with the Order and recruited Yukio—believing him fully human—while seeking to kill Rin for his demonic heritage. Ernst attempted to sacrifice Rin to open Gehenna's Gate, but Satan intervened, dragging Ernst through the portal to his death.

=== Usamaro ===
Voiced by: Rie Kugimiya (Japanese); Cassandra Lee Morris (English)

Usamaro (うさ麻呂) is a young demon Rin meets in the Phantom Train subjugation mission during the events of the movie. He seems to be sealed in a shrine for an unknown reason. He is looked after by Rin during the festival.

=== Cheng-Long Liu ===
Voiced by: Hidenobu Kiuchi (Japanese); Todd Haberkorn (English)

Cheng-Long Liu (リュウ・セイリュウ, Ryū Seiryū) is an Upper First Class Exorcist from the Taiwan branch that is featured in the film. Comes to Japan to help True Cross Academy change a new barrier. From an elite family and has high exorcism skills.

== Reception ==
The characters of Blue Exorcist have been well received by publications for manga and anime with Rin Okumura's receiving most with Danica Davidson from Otaku USA praising his heroic traits despite his demonic nature. Although Carl Kimlinger found that the cast contained several stereotypes found in other series, the delivery from them made the series entertaining first noting the comedy and then fight scenes. In a later review he noted how the secondary characters were given their own episodes to be developed as well other ones where they get closer with Rin. Similar comments were given by Comic Book Bin reviewer Leroy Douresseaux who enjoyed the interaction between the cast, while Chris Beveridge from The Fandom Post noted that while characters' regrouping may feel forced, the revelation of Rin's nature bring multiple reactions to them. The designs by author Kazue Kato were also praised for the way its character is given their distinct traits as well as the changes from Rin when using his demonic powers.

== See also ==
- List of Blue Exorcist chapters
- List of Blue Exorcist episodes
