= Kyle Hebert =

American voice actor

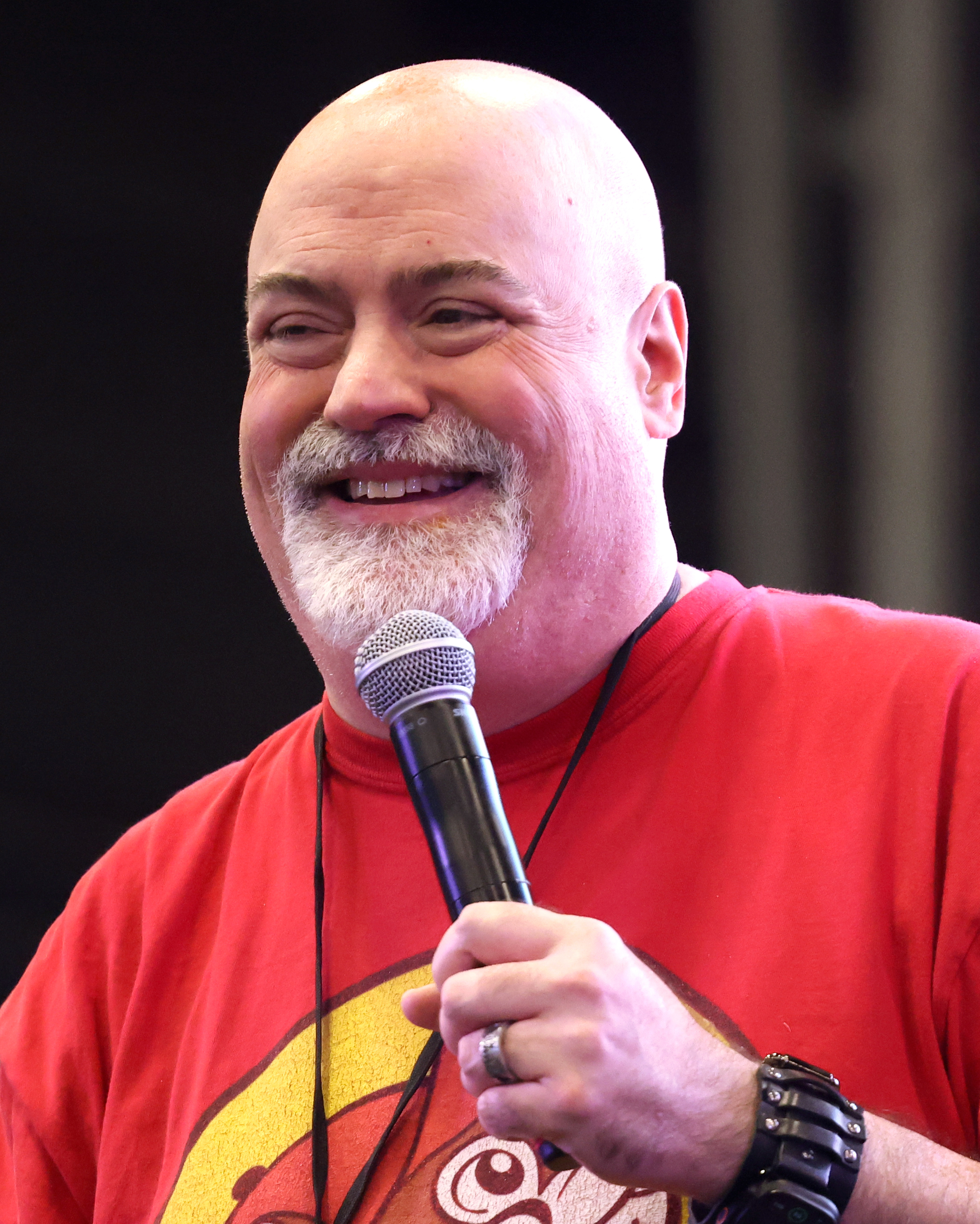
- Hebert in 2026
- Born: Kyle Henry Hebert; Lake Charles, Louisiana, U.S.
- Other name: Squeege
- Occupation: Voice actor
- Years active: 1996–present
- Spouse: Christina Louise (m. 2018)
- Children: 1
- Website: www.kylehebert.com

Kyle Henry Hebert (/ˈeɪbɛər/ AY-bair) is an American voice actor known for his work in anime and video game series, such as the teenage/adult Gohan and the narrator in the Funimation dub of the Dragon Ball series, Sousuke Aizen in Bleach, Ryu in the Street Fighter video game series, Kiba Inuzuka in Naruto, Kamina in Gurren Lagann, Ryuji Suguro in Blue Exorcist, Noriaki Kakyoin in JoJo's Bizarre Adventure: Stardust Crusaders, Dribble and Dr. Crygor in WarioWare series, Kazuichi Soda and Kaito Momota in the Danganronpa series, and Big the Cat in Sonic the Hedgehog series.

== Career ==
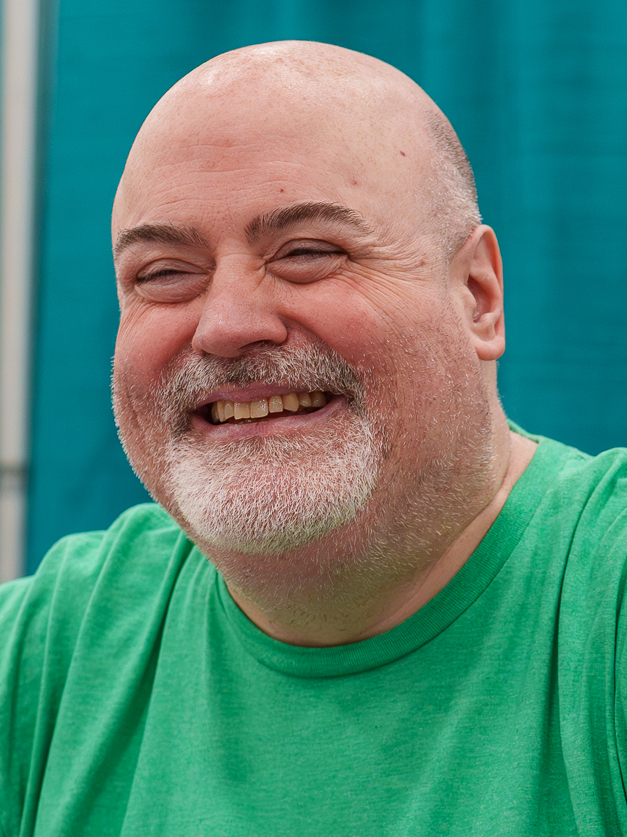
Hebert speaking with fans at the 2025 GalaxyCon St. Louis

Hebert got his start in voice-over during the mid-1990s as a disc jockey for Radio Disney, under the pseudonym Squeege. This lasted until September 2005, when he moved from Dallas to Los Angeles, to get bigger interests in the world of voice acting.

He had cameo roles in various anime dubs such as Case Closed, Fruits Basket, and One Piece with recurring roles including Fullmetal Alchemist, Kiba Inuzuka on Naruto, Sousuke Aizen and Ganju Shiba in Bleach, Kamina in Gurren Lagann, Son Gohan in the Dragon Ball series, Ryu in the Street Fighter series, and Big the Cat in the Sonic the Hedgehog series since 2010.

In 2009 and 2011, he voiced "The Sniper" in the animated spoof of Dirty Harry films entitled Magnum Farce and is set to reprise the expanded role of Blivit, The Sniper and that of Governor Arnold Schwartzenherzen-Geldengrubber in the feature film currently in production.

At Anime Expo 2009, Kyle won Best English Voice Actor in the SPJA Awards for his role as Kamina in Gurren Lagann. He is also a podcaster, co-founding and hosting the weekly BigBaldBroadcast with his long-time friend, known only as "Otherworld" Steve.

== Personal life ==
Originally from Lake Charles, Louisiana, Hebert is the son of Henry Hebert, an information technology specialist, and Sharone, a legal secretary.

On July 10, 2015, Hebert proposed to Christina Louise, an author whom goes by the pen name Ryter Rong. They married on February 14, 2018.

He has a daughter, Kayla Marie Hebert, who was born in 1996.

Hebert revealed his autism diagnosis on Twitter in 2017.

== Filmography ==
=== Anime ===
List of English dubbing performances in anime
Year	Series	Role	Notes	Source
1999–2003; 2005	Dragon Ball Z	Gohan (Older), Narrator, Ox King, others	Funimation dub	Resume
2007–13	Bleach	Ganju Shiba, Sousuke Aizen, Kaien Shiba, Nirgge Parduoc		Website
2007	Eureka Seven	Ken-Goh	Season 2	Website
2007	Higurashi: When They Cry	Jirō Tomitake		Website
2007	Ergo Proxy	MCQ		Website
2007	MÄR	Peta		Resume
2007	Ghost in the Shell: Solid State Society	Munei, Detective, CSI Tech		Website
2007	The Third: The Girl with the Blue Eye	Various characters		Website
2007	Mega Man Star Force	Omega-Xis		Website
2007	Digimon Data Squad	Belphemon		Website
2007	Hell Girl	Yoshiyuki Kusuno		Resume
2008	Tweeny Witches	Luca		Resume
2008	Blue Dragon	Gilliam, Legolas		Website
2008	Buso Renkin	Hiwatari		Website
2008	Lucky Star	Various characters		Website
2008	Gurren Lagann	Kamina	Best English Voice Actor, Male, Society for the Promotion of Japanese Animation, 2009	Website
2008	Moribito: Guardian of the Spirit	Sun, Jiguro Muso		Website
2008	Freedom Project	Gosche		Resume
2008	Ouran High School Host Club	Kazukiyo Soga		Resume
2008	Darker than Black	Reiji Kikuchi		Resume
2008	Ghost Slayers Ayashi	Hozaburo Ogasawara		Website
2008–present	One Piece	Nefertari Cobra, Capone Bege, Higuma, Nola, Gohan (eps. 590), others	Funimation dub	Website
2009	Kenichi: The Mightiest Disciple	Tsukaba		Resume
2009	Shigurui: Death Frenzy	Naotsugu Andou		Resume
2009	D.Gray-man	George the Mayor		Resume
2009	Blade of the Immortal	Shido		Resume
2009	Honey and Clover	Ippei, Asai, Lohmeyer		Website
2009	Monster	Maurer, Fritz Vardemann		Resume
2009–19	Naruto: Shippuden	Kiba Inuzuka, Inoichi, Akatsuchi, others		Website
2010	Soul Eater	Masamune Nakatsukasa		Website
2010	Fullmetal Alchemist: Brotherhood	Vato Falman		Resume
2010	Initial D: First Stage	Mr. Tsuchiya	Ep. 23, Funimation dub	
2010	Eden of the East	Kiba		Website
2010–13; 2017–18	Dragon Ball Z Kai	Gohan (Older), Ox King, Narrator, others	Also The Final Chapters	
2011	Durarara!!	Horada		Resume
2012	Puella Magi Madoka Magica	Tomohisa Kaname		Resume
2012	Persona 4: The Animation	Mitsuo Kubo		
2013	Fate/Zero	Berserker		
2013	Nura: Rise of the Yokai Clan	Aotabo		
2013	Blue Exorcist	Ryuji "Bon" Suguro		
2013	Tenkai Knights	Beag, Eurus		Website
2013	Fate/Zero	Berserker		
2013	Pokémon Origins	Professor Oak		Website
2013	Ikki Tousen	Kanshou Kochuu	Great Guardians, Xtreme Xecutor series	
2013–15	Digimon Fusion	Ballistamon, Dorulumon, Greymon, others		
2014	JoJo's Bizarre Adventure: Stardust Crusaders	Noriaki Kakyoin		Website
2014	Attack on Titan	Mitabi Jarnach		
2014	Sushi Ninja	Nacho Snake, Narrator		
2014	Blood Lad	Dek		
2014	Gargantia on the Verdurous Planet	Crown, Marocchi		Website
2014	Kill la Kill	Hojo	Ep. 8	Website
2014–15	Rock Lee and His Ninja Pals	Narrator, others		Website
2015	The Seven Deadly Sins	Escanor, Weinheidt, Dale, Dana		Website
2016	Hunter × Hunter	Umori, Masta, Morel Mackernasey others	2011 series	Website
2016	One-Punch Man	Atomic Samurai, Bespectacled Worker, Kamakyuri		Website
2016	God Eater	Lindow Amamiya		
2016	Pokémon Generations	Eusine		Website
2017	Kabaneri of the Iron Fortress	Kibito	Also in movie 'Kabaneri of the Iron Fortress: The Battle of Unato'	
2017	Mob Psycho 100	Toichiro Suzuki	Also season 2	
2017–19	Dragon Ball Super	Gohan (Older), Future Gohan, Ox-King, others	Funimation dub	
2018–present	Baki	Spec	Netflix ONA, Netflix dub	
2018	Sword Gai The Animation	Mystery Face A, Shuntaro Sekiya	Netflix ONA	
2018	Last Hope	Doug Horvant		Netflix
2018	Granblue Fantasy The Animation	Rackam		
2019	Boruto: Naruto Next Generations	Kiba Inuzuka, Jūgo	Hebert replaces Travis Willingham for Jūgo's role	
2019–25	My Hero Academia	Fat Gum		
2019–25	Welcome to Demon School! Iruma-kun	Sullivan		
2020	Somali and the Forest Spirit	Golem		
2020	Beastars	Sanou, Boss		
2020	Demon Slayer: Kimetsu no Yaiba	Kanamori		
2020	Pokémon Journeys	Referee Dan	Flash of the Titans!, The Climb to Be the Very Best!	Website
2021–present	Vinland Saga	Ragnar, Gardar	Netflix Dub	Website
2021–present	Jujutsu Kaisen	Yoshinobu Gakuganji, Naobito Zen'in, Wasuke Itadori, Takeshi Iguchi		
2022–present	Bleach: Thousand-Year Blood War	Ganju Shiba, Sousuke Aizen		
2024	My Hero Academia Season 7	Agpar		
2025	Witch Watch	Reiji Otogi		

=== Live action series dubbing ===
List of English dubbing performances in live action series
Year	Title	Country	Dubbed from	Role	Live Actor	Source
2016	The Break	Belgium	French	René Verselt	Tom Audenaert	

=== Animation ===
List of voice performances in animation
Year	Series	Role	Notes	Source
2010	NFL Rush Zone	Coach Jones, others		Resume
2010	The Avengers: Earth's Mightiest Heroes	Super-Skrull, Skrull Assistant, Dr. Lyle Getz, AIM Drone #2 (2)		
2011	Secret Millionaires Club	Enzo	Ep. 4	Resume
2016–18	Zak Storm	Calabrass		
2019	YooHoo to the Rescue	Slo		

=== Film ===
List of voice and English dubbing performances in feature films
Year	Title	Role	Notes	Source
2011	Hoodwinked Too! Hood vs. Evil	Voiceover Actors		
2012	Wreck-It Ralph	Ryu		
2013	Thunder and the House of Magic	Mark Matthews	Limited theatrical release (USA)	
2014	Dragon Ball Z: Battle of Gods	Gohan, Narrator, Ox King	Limited theatrical release	
2015	Dragon Ball Z: Resurrection 'F'	Gohan	Limited theatrical release	
2016	Alice Through the Looking Glass	Young Bayard		Tweet
2016	Your Name	Katsuhiko Teshigawara		
2016–18	Digimon Adventure tri.	Greymon/MetalGreymon/WarGreymon, Omnimon (Shared)	Limited theatrical release	
2018	Lu Over the Wall	Fuguda		
2018	The Seven Deadly Sins the Movie: Prisoners of the Sky	Escanor		
2018	Ralph Breaks the Internet	Ryu	Archive audio, uncredited	
2019	One Piece: Stampede	Capone Bege		
2020	Ni no Kuni	Pub Patron	Netflix dub	
2020	Stand by Me Doraemon 2	Naka Meguro	English dub	
2022	Dragon Ball Super: Super Hero	Gohan		

List of voice and English dubbing performances in direct-to-video and television films
Year	Title	Role	Notes	Source
2002–05	Lupin III specials	General Headhunter, Burton, Butrakari, Goering, others		Resume
2005	Dragon Ball Z: Broly - Second Coming	Gohan		
2006	Dragon Ball Z: Fusion Reborn	Gohan, Narrator, Pikkon, others		
2006	Dragon Ball Z: Wrath of the Dragon	Gohan		
2006	Case Closed: The Time Bombed Skyscraper	Schwartz		
2007	Naruto the Movie: Ninja Clash in the Land of Snow	Mizore Fuyukuma, others		Website
2008	Naruto the Movie 2: Legend of the Stone of Gelel	Kahiko	Grouped under Cast	Website
2008	Resident Evil: Degeneration	Zombie, Newscaster, Bodyguard		Resume
2009–13	Magnum Farce	Blivit The Wing-Nut Sniper, Gov. Schwartzenhertzen-Geldengruber	Short films "A Shot in the Park" and "Along Came a Sniper", along with feature film	Website
2011	Tekken: Blood Vengeance	Kazuya Mishima		
2011–12	Marvel Anime	Ho Yinsen; Various; Saragi, Sergei	Iron Man; Wolverine; Blade	Website
2012	Redline	Big Deyzuna		Website
2012	Oblivion Island: Haruka and the Magic Mirror	Decargot		Website
2012	Golden Winter	Mean Dog #1	Live-action animal dub	
2013	A Turtle's Tale 2: Sammy's Great Escape	Seagull 2		
2014	Avengers Confidential: Black Widow & Punisher	Cain		
2015	The Last: Naruto the Movie	Kiba Inuzuka		
2020	Digimon Adventure: Last Evolution Kizuna	Greymon/MetalGreymon, Omnimon (Shared), Agumon Bond of Courage, Additional Voices	Uncredited for Greymon, MetalGreymon, Omnimon, and Agumon Bond of Courage	

=== Video games ===
List of voice and English dubbing performances in video games
Year	Title	Role	Notes	Source
2002–present	Dragon Ball series	Gohan (Adult), Future Gohan, Narrator, others		
2004	Yu Yu Hakusho: Dark Tournament	Karasu, M2		Resume
2004	BloodRayne 2	Demons		Resume
2004	EverQuest II	Voidman, Stone Golem, Skeleton, Ogre, Werewolf		Resume
2005	Riviera: The Promised Land	Ledah		Resume
2006–present	Naruto series	Kiba, Inoichi, Akatsuchi, Manda, Ebizo, Shinga		
2006	Enchanted Arms	Various characters		Resume
2006	Baten Kaitos Origins	Juwar		Resume
2006	Valkyrie Profile 2: Silmeria	Aaron Dyn, Farant, Psoron, Zunde		
2006	Desperate Housewives: The Game	Carlos Solis		
2007	World of Warcraft: Burning Crusade	Blood Elf		Resume
2007	.hack//G.U. vol.2//Reminisce	Krewhaha, Skumumu		
2007	Dawn of Mana	Masked Guru		Website
2007	Wild Arms 5	Volsung		Resume
2007	.hack//G.U. vol.3//Redemption	Krewhaha, Skumumu		Resume
2007	Growlanser: Heritage of War	Zeikwalt		Resume
2007	Digimon World Data Squad	Beelzemon, Belphemon, Masaki Nitta		
2007	Castlevania: The Dracula X Chronicles	Narrator, Nose Demon		Resume
2007	Soldier of Fortune: Payback	Thomas Mason		Resume
2007–14	Bleach series	Sousuke Aizen, Ganju Shiba, Kaien Shiba		Website
2008	Devil May Cry 4	Bael & Dagon		
2008	The Spiderwick Chronicles	Hogsqueal		Website
2008	Dynasty Warriors 6	Sima Yi, Xu Huang, Zhou Tai		Resume
2008	Baroque	Archangel		Resume
2008	Summon Night: Twin Age	Arlus, additional voices		Website
2008	Final Fantasy Fables: Chocobo's Dungeon	Marris the Fishmonger		Resume
2008	Infinite Undiscovery	Sigmund, Helm		Website
2008	Armored Core: For Answer	Otsdarva, Thermidor		Resume
2008	Yggdra Union: We'll Never Fight Alone	Various characters		Website
2008	Guilty Gear 2: Overture	Blade, Roller		Resume
2008	Golden Axe: Beast Rider	Beasts		Website
2008	Command & Conquer: Red Alert 3	Imperial Nanocore, Allied Mobile Construction, Allied IFV		Resume
2008	Tales of Symphonia: Dawn of the New World	Richter Abend, Dirk the Dwarf		Resume
2008	World of Warcraft: Wrath of the Lich King	Algalon the Observer		Resume
2008	The Last Remnant	Zuido		Resume
2008	Persona 4	Mitsuo Kubo		
2009	Star Ocean: Second Evolution	Jophiel, Dias Flac		
2009	Tenchu: Shadow Assassins	Kurogawa, Ninja		Resume
2009	Star Ocean: The Last Hope	Arumat, Crow		
2009	MadWorld	"Big Bull" Crocker, Scissors Man, Ninja		
2009	Resident Evil 5	Majini		Resume
2009	Valkyrie Profile: Covenant of the Plume	Fauxnel		Resume
2009	Dynasty Warriors: Strikeforce	Xu Huang, Zhou Tai		Website
2009	Watchmen: The End is Nigh	Thugs		Website
2009	Wolfenstein	Hans Grosse, PA Voice	Xbox, PS3 versions	Resume
2009	League of Legends	Ezreal, Jarvan IV, Graves		Resume
2009	Kamen Rider: Dragon Knight	Xaviax		
2009	James Cameron's Avatar: The Game	Rai 'Uk		Website
2009	Final Fantasy Crystal Chronicles: The Crystal Bearers	Additional voices		
2009–present	Street Fighter series	Ryu	IV, X Tekken, V, 6	
2010	Final Fantasy XIII	Cocoon Inhabitants		
2010	Comic Jumper: The Adventures of Captain Smiley	Benny, Security Guards, Villagers		Website
2010	Sengoku Basara: Samurai Heroes	Tachibana Muneshige		Website
2010	Time Crisis: Razing Storm	O’Neal		Website
2010	Zettai Hero Project	Pirohiko	PSP version	Website
2010	Sonic Colors	Big the Cat	DS version	Resume
2010	X-Men	All male characters	PS3, Xbox 360, and mobile versions	Website
2011	Marvel vs. Capcom 3: Fate of Two Worlds	Ryu	Also Ultimate Marvel vs. Capcom 3	Website
2011	Ar Tonelico Qoga: Knell of Ar Ciel	Hikari Gojou		Website
2011	Gods Eater Burst	Lindow		Website
2011	Shin Megami Tensei: Devil Survivor Overclocked	Naoya		Website
2011	Atelier Totori: The Adventurer of Arland	Guid		Website
2011	Rune Factory: Tides of Destiny	Gerard, Goblin Captain, Belzagor		Website
2011	Dynasty Warriors 7	Sima Yi, Zhou Tai, Ding Feng, Xu Huang	also Xtreme Legends	Website
2011	Saints Row: The Third	Tough Guy White Male, White Bum		Website
2011	Marvel Pinball: Vengeance and Virtue	Odin, Juggernaut		Website
2012	Soulcalibur V	Cold Assassin	Custom voice	Website
2012	Dynasty Warriors Next	Sima Yi, Zhou Tai, Ding Feng, Xu Huang		Website
2012	Hyperdimension Neptunia Mk2	CFW Judge, narrator, others		Website
2012	Lollipop Chainsaw	Basketballer, Geek Zombie		Website
2012	Marvel Pinball: Avengers Chronicles	Iron Man, Silver Surfer, Odin		Website
2012	Unchained Blades	Canhel		Resume
2012	Guild Wars 2	Hamar, Great Ginz, Ogron		Resume
2012	Resident Evil 6	Submarine Computer, BSAA Soldier, BSAA Agent, Umbrella Juavo, Refugee		Resume
2012	Mugen Souls	Soul		Website
2012	Skylanders: Giants	Various stadium attendees		Resume
2013	Fire Emblem Awakening	Frederick, Validar		Website
2013	Atelier Ayesha: The Alchemist of Dusk	Kyle Tarenbert		Resume
2013	Battle High 2	Jiro		Website
2013	Defiance	Jarisha Indur Darti, Mutant Cleaver, Ark Hunter, Sett Morcu, Farmer, Infected Male		Website
2013	Shin Megami Tensei – Devil Summoner: Soul Hackers	Carol J, Urabe, Romero, Chef, Horror House Navigator, Dock Worker, Sage, Omphalos		Resume
2013	Marvel Heroes	Wiccan, J. Jonah Jameson		
2013	Dynasty Warriors 8	Sima Yi, Zhou Tai, Ding Feng, Xu Huang	also Xtreme Legends	Website
2013	Shin Megami Tensei IV	Fujiwara, Demiurge, Ring of Gaea member, Koumokuten, Cernunnos, Fiend, Master Samurai, Bizarre Man, Glaring Man, Familiar Man, Middle Aged Man		Website
2013	Final Fantasy XIV: A Realm Reborn	Lahabrea		Resume
2013	Armored Core: Verdict Day	Various pilots	Credited as Kyle Herbert	In-game credits
2013	Phoenix Wright: Ace Attorney - Dual Destinies	Miles Edgeworth		Website
2013	Pac-Man and the Ghostly Adventures	Fluffy, Cyclops		
2014	Bravely Default	Ominas Crowe		Website
2014	Inazuma Eleven	Ray Dark, Seymour Hillman, David Samford, Jack Wallside, Thomas Feldt, Kevin Dragonfly, Joseph King		Website
2014	The Witch and the Hundred Knight	Lionelle the 13th, Wedge Wimp, Damuu Priest, Valentine's bodyguard		Website
2014	The Amazing Spider-Man 2	Citizens, Thugs		Website
2014	Spider-Man Unlimited	J. Jonah Jameson, Doctor Octopus, Solus		Website
2014	Mugen Souls Z	Soul		Website
2014	Danganronpa 2: Goodbye Despair	Kazuichi Soda		Website
2014	Fairy Fencer F	Paiga, Zagi		Website
2014	Disney Infinity 2.0: Marvel Super Heroes	J. Jonah Jameson		
2014	Natural Doctrine	Geoff		Website
2014	Super Smash Bros. for Nintendo 3DS / Wii U	Ryu	DLC	In-game credits
2015	Final Fantasy Type-0 HD	Nimbus		
2015	Word Chums	Zombie, Cat, Pig, Alien		Website
2015	Stella Glow	Keith		Tweet
2015	Xenoblade Chronicles X	Additional voices		
2016	Phoenix Wright: Ace Attorney - Spirit of Justice	Miles Edgeworth		
2017	Fire Emblem Heroes	Bartre, Frederick		
2017	Nier: Automata	Additional voices		
2017	Persona 5	Ichiryusai Madarame		
2017	Puyo Puyo Tetris	Risukuma, Popoi		Tweet
2017	Fire Emblem Echoes: Shadows of Valentia	Valbar		
2017	Marvel vs. Capcom: Infinite	Ryu		
2017	Danganronpa V3: Killing Harmony	Kaito Momota		Tweet
2018	WarioWare Gold	Dribble, Dr. Crygor, Mr. Sparkles		
2018	Super Smash Bros. Ultimate	Ryu	Archive audio	In-game credits
2019	Ace Combat 7: Skies Unknown	Mihaly A. Shilage		Tweet
2019	Dead or Alive 6	Rig	Uncredited	
2019	Team Sonic Racing	Big the Cat, Dodon Pa		Resume
2019	Teppen	Ryu		
2019	Pokémon Masters	Crasher Wake		
2020	One-Punch Man: A Hero Nobody Knows	Atomic Samurai		
2020	Granblue Fantasy Versus	Rackam		
2020	Persona 5 Royal	Ichiryusai Madarame, Shibusawa		
2020	The Legend of Heroes: Trails of Cold Steel IV	Cassius Bright, Vincent Florald		
2020	Yakuza: Like a Dragon	Additional voices		
2021	WarioWare: Get It Together!	Dribble, Dr. Crygor		
2021	Demon Slayer: Kimetsu no Yaiba – The Hinokami Chronicles	Kanamori, Rui's Father		
2022	Rune Factory 5	Heinz		
2022	AI: The Somnium Files – Nirvana Initiative	Chinpei Wagai		
2022	Fire Emblem Warriors: Three Hopes	Additional voices		
2022	Sonic Frontiers	Big the Cat		
2023	The Legend of Heroes: Trails into Reverie	Ebon Defense Force, Crossbell Guardian Force		
2023	Armored Core VI: Fires of Rubicon	King, additional voices		
2023	WarioWare: Move It!	Dribble, Dr. Crygor, Mr. Sparkles		
2023	Granblue Fantasy Versus: Rising	Rackam		
2024	Like a Dragon: Infinite Wealth	Additional voices		
2024	Granblue Fantasy: Relink	Rackam		
2024	Puyo Puyo Puzzle Pop	Popoi, Risukuma		
2024	Shadow Generations	Big the Cat		
2025	Dynasty Warriors: Origins	Lu Bu		
2025	Digimon Story: Time Stranger	Bacchusmon, Omnimon, additional voices		
2026	Yakuza Kiwami 3 & Dark Ties	Ryuzo Tamiya, additional voices		
2026	Mega Man Star Force Legacy Collection	Omega-Xis		
2026	Trails in the Sky 2nd Chapter	Cassius Bright		
2026	Danganronpa 2×2	Kazuichi Soda		

=== Film ===
List acting performances in films
Year	Title	Role	Notes	Source
2008	Adventures in Voice Acting	Himself	Documentary film	Website

=== Web series ===
Year	Title	Role	Notes	Source
2015	JonTron's StarCade	Darth Vader	Voice	
