= Dog Lover's Symphony =

- Directed by: Ted Fukuda
- Written by: Ted Fukuda
- Produced by: Mike Yamamoto
- Starring: Jesse Bernstein; Alaina Huffman
- Cinematography: Jeffrey R. Clark
- Edited by: Bob Joyce
- Music by: Jeff Marsh
- Release date: 2006
- Running time: 103 minutes
- Country: United States
- Language: English
- Box office: $2,968

Dog Lover's Symphony is a 2006 drama directed by Ted Fukuda. The movie follows Jerry (Jesse Bernstein (Note: Credited as Jesse Berns)), a recovering drug addict who finds work at a local dog training school, and Susan (Alaina Huffman (Note: Credited as Alaina Kalanj)), an employee at the school. A dog named Toby (voiced by Bryce Papenbrook) provides sporadic narration throughout the movie.

Dog Lover's Symphony received extremely negative reviews.

== Plot ==
Jerry is a recovering drug addict and ex-gang member. Through the help of his lawyer Tom, Jerry is placed in housing, but he struggles to find work.

Tom's daughter Susan takes an interest in Jerry. She works at a dog training school and encourages Jerry to become a dog trainer. He reluctantly agrees. The two bond while training a dog named Toby and develop a romantic attraction.

Susan, however, is engaged to John, who is suspicious of Jerry. John eventually reveals that he is marrying Susan to secure a business deal.

In addition, Jerry is falsely accused of stealing a purse at the school, and he quits in protest. Meanwhile, Susan realizes she knew Jerry in high school. Susan leaves John and Jerry proposes to Susan with an airplane banner. Jerry also reveals he has an estranged father who lives in Japan.

En route to graduation day at the dog training school, Jerry is mortally injured in a car crash. Susan rushes from her wedding dress fitting to the hospital, where Jerry dies.

Susan moves forward with the wedding despite Jerry's demise, contracting a computer graphics expert to project a digital recreation of Jerry during the ceremony. During the wedding, the projection of Jerry transforms into a physical but speechless "real Jerry". Susan and the corporealized Jerry complete the ceremony and are married before Jerry vanishes again. After the ceremony, Jerry's father offers Susan a check for $10,000,000, which she refuses.

Years later, Susan still lives alone with multiple dogs descended from Toby. Her ex-fiancé John has now married her best friend Kelly, and her father Tom reveals he accepted the $10,000,000 check and invested it. Susan uses the money to build dog shelters in Jerry's name. Jerry and Toby look down from heaven.

== Cast ==
- Jesse Bernstein as Jerry
- Alaina Huffman as Susan
- Maxwell Caulfield as Tom
- Nikki Bohannon as Kelly
- Sean Foley as John
- David Schroeder as Chief Roy
- Alexander Zale as the schoolmaster
- Bryce Papenbrook as Toby the dog (voice)

== Reception ==
Dog Lover's Symphony received harsh reviews on release. In one review, the Los Angeles Times described it as a "stinker" and in another review said it was "off on all fronts." LA Weekly attacked it as a "toxic combination of obvious bromides and talentless filmmaking." Variety was no more positive, calling it a "slobbery mess" and a source of "accidental hilarity."
