= Alaina Huffman =

Canadian actress

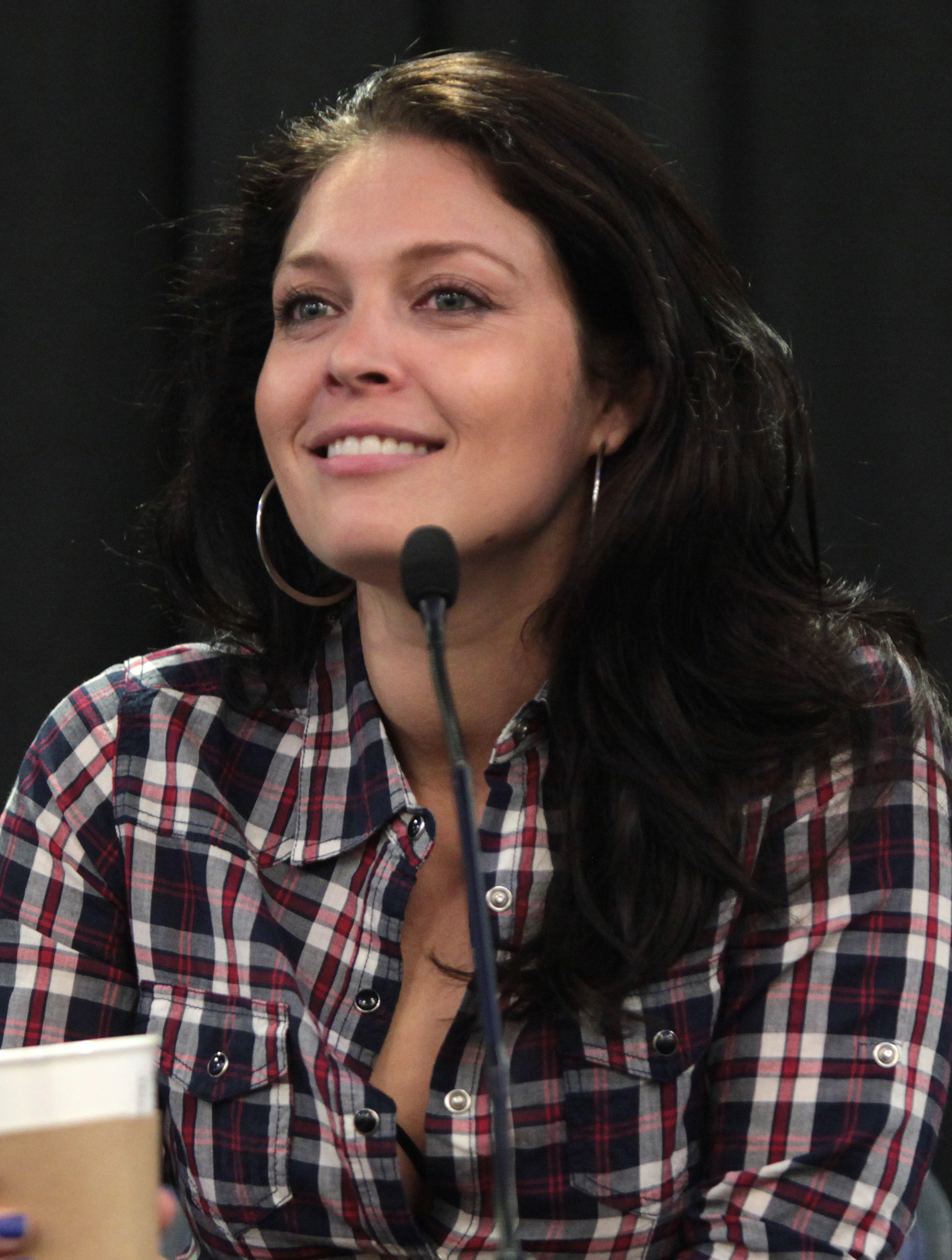
- Huffman in 2015
- Born: Alaina Kalanj; April 17, 1980 (age 46); Vancouver, British Columbia, Canada
- Occupations: Actress, model
- Years active: 2001–present
- Spouse: John Henry Huffman IV (m. 2003; div. 2016)
- Children: 4

Alaina Kalanj (also known as Alaina Huffman) (born April 17, 1980) is a Canadian film and television actress, best known for the television series Painkiller Jane, where she played the character Maureen Bowers. She played Dinah Lance / Black Canary in the TV series Smallville, and 1st Lt. Tamara Johansen in Stargate Universe, where she was a regular cast member. She played the part of a surviving Knight of Hell Abaddon in the American dark-fantasy television series Supernatural.

== Biography ==
Huffman was born Alaina Kalanj in Vancouver, British Columbia, Canada. She is of Croatian descent. At the age of 13, she went to her first audition for a Fox Family Channel pilot, where she was offered the main role. A scout for a modeling agency instead recruited Huffman, and she was set to model in high fashion runways in Europe and Japan for the following years.

When her parents moved to Dallas, Texas, she saw the opportunity to live in the United States and enroll in college, leaving modeling behind. While in school, she took on acting roles in a series of independent films. Eventually she moved to Los Angeles, where she added more television credits to her resume.

Alaina has four children with ex-husband John Huffman: sons Elijah and Lincoln, and daughters Hanna and Charley-Jane. While pregnant with Charley-Jane, she was acting in the first season of Stargate Universe, so the pregnancy was written into the plot.

== Filmography ==
Year	Title	Role	Notes
2001	Indefinitely	Cherry	
2001	Pendulum	Terry Weiss	
2002	Dawson's Creek	Rina, the hot girl	Episode: "Guerilla Filmmaking"
2002	Serving Sara	Spa Receptionist	
2003	Screen Door Jesus	Sharon Beaudry	
2003	Still	Mary	
2003	Quiet Desperation	Helen Calloway	
2003	Tru Calling	Paige Saunders	Episode: "Haunted"
2003	The O.C.	Yvette	Episode: "The Countdown"
2004	Night Dawn Day	Woman	
2004	With It	Mafia Girlfriend	
2004	The Gunman	Lori Simms	
2004	Medical Investigation	Estella	Episode: "Escape"
2005	Standing Still	Maria	
2006	Dog Lover's Symphony	Susan	
2007	Painkiller Jane	Maureen Bowers	
2007	NCIS	Dana Arnett	Episode: "Leap of Faith"
2007–2011	Smallville	Dinah Lance / Black Canary	6 episodes
2008	Jack Hunter and the Lost Treasure of Ugarit	Lena Halstrom	TV mini-series
2008	CSI: NY	Lori Winston	Episode: "The Box"
2008	CSI: Miami	Cassandra Gray	Episode: "Raging Cannibal"
2008	An American Carol	Celebrity #1	
2009	Broken August	August King	
2009	Lushes	Faux Charlize Theron	
2009–2011	Stargate Universe	1st Lt. Tamara Johansen	Series regular
2011	Alphas	Sarah Nelson	Episode: "Bill and Gary's Excellent Adventure"
2012	NCIS: Los Angeles	Serena Miller	Episode: "Neighborhood Watch"
2013–2014	Supernatural	Abaddon/Josie Sands	8 episodes
2016	Amber Alert	Amber	
2018	The Perfection	Paloma	
2020	The 100	Nikki	Recurring role (8 episodes)
2021	Missing Twin	Jenny Markham	
2022–2023	Riverdale	Twyla Twyst	Recurring S6 (4 episodes), S7 (3 episodes)
2024	Waltzing with Brando	Dana	
