= Pokémon Generations =

Pokémon ONA series

ポケモンジェネレーションズ (Pokemon Jenerēshonzu)
- Original net animation
- Directed by: Daiki Tomiyasu
- Written by: Atsuhiro Tomioka
- Music by: OLM MUSIC, Inc
- Studio: OLM (Team Kato)
- Released: September 16, 2016 – December 23, 2016
- Runtime: 3–5 minutes
- Episodes: 18

Pokémon Generations (ポケモンジェネレーションズ, Pokemon Jenerēshonzu) is a 2016 Japanese-animated original net animation (ONA) series produced by OLM and released on YouTube by The Pokémon Company. The series consists of several short stories inspired by Nintendo's Pokémon video game series (from Generations I to VI), as opposed to its main television series. A total of 18 episodes were produced, and were originally released in English on YouTube between September 16, 2016, and December 23, 2016. Japanese episodes have also aired via YouTube.

== Episode list ==
EP#	Title	US air date	Japanese air date
1	"The Adventure" "Bōken"	September 16, 2016	December 9, 2016
A Pokémon trainer (the player character from Pokémon Red and Blue) catches a wild Pikachu, embarking on a long adventure and battling Pokémon in different regions, from Kanto's Viridian Forest to Kalos' Terminus Cave.
2	"The Chase" "Tsuiseki"	September 16, 2016	December 9, 2016
In Kanto, Detective Looker leads a unit to infiltrate the Viridian City Gym in order to capture Team Rocket's leader, Giovanni. Upon storming the Gym, however, Looker finds Giovanni gone, only discovering evidence of a recent battle. Giovanni is seen fleeing the city, covertly planning Team Rocket's revival.
3	"The Challenger" "Chōsensha"	September 23, 2016	December 9, 2016
The members of the Elite Four face off against a challenger (the rival character from Red and Blue) who wishes to become the champion of the Kanto region. After he defeats all four members, he becomes the new Pokémon League Champion, but his newly earned title gets its first challenge when a familiar face appears.
4	"The Lake of Rage" "Ikari no Mizuumi"	September 30, 2016	December 9, 2016
After encountering a red Gyarados, Lance of the Elite Four goes to infiltrate a facility taken over by Team Rocket remnants. With help from a trainer (the player character from Pokémon Gold and Silver), Lance infiltrates the secret laboratory and defeats Team Rocket's admins, freeing the captive Electrode powering the radio frequency transmitter that induces Pokémon evolution.
5	"The Legacy" "Keishō"	October 7, 2016	December 9, 2016
Following Team Rocket's takeover of the Goldenrod Radio Tower, Detective Looker questions Giovanni's son (the rival character from Pokémon Gold and Silver) about his father's whereabouts and his upcoming plans. The son doesn't share, reminiscing of his last conversation with Giovanni that led him into becoming a trainer. He cuts the conversation short as he heads to the Indigo Plateau to challenge the Pokémon League.
6	"The Reawakening" "Saisei"	October 7, 2016	December 9, 2016
Eusine explores Ecruteak City's Burned Tower in Johto, looking into the legends of three Pokémon—Entei, Raikou, and Suicune—that were resurrected from its flames. Their revival caused the townspeople to fear the three Pokémon and shun them, forcing them to flee.
7	"The Vision" "Bijon"	October 14, 2016	December 16, 2016
In the Hoenn region, Team Magma attempts to hold off an intruder (the player character from Pokémon Ruby and Sapphire) and his Sceptile while they prepare to bring their dream to fruition: awakening the Legendary Pokémon Groudon to create more landmass. The trainer fails to stop Team Magma's leader, Maxie, from departing, leaving one of his admins, Courtney, to delay the trainer. However, Courtney sees a terrifying vision of Maxie and his troops successfully awakening Groudon and reverting it to its Primal form with the Red Orb, but it turns on and attacks them.
8	"The Cavern" "Kaitei Dōkutsu"	October 21, 2016	December 16, 2016
In a deep sea cavern, Archie, leader of Team Aqua, awakens Kyogre, against the warnings of his admin, Shelley. As the Sea Basin Pokémon awakens and transforms into its Primal state with the Blue Orb, it surges a fierce rainstorm, stranding Team Aqua's sub and leaving them at Kyogre's mercy.
9	"The Scoop" "Sukūpu"	October 28, 2016	December 16, 2016
News reporter Gabby and her cameraman, Ty, uncover top secret footage of a Pokémon battle between two legendary Pokémon in outer space: Deoxys and Mega Rayquaza. The trainer riding Rayquaza defeats and catches Deoxys. Gabby and Ty take the hard drive containing the footage, but must evade mysterious forces that want to silence them.
10	"The Old Chateau" "Mori no Yōkan"	October 28, 2016	December 22, 2016
Within the Sinnoh region, Cheryl and her Chansey arrive at the Old Chateau in Eterna Forest, unaware of its haunted nature. An old man invites them inside, where Ghost-type Pokémon appear and trap Cheryl and Chansey in a haunting separate dimension.
11	"The New World" "Atarashii Sekai"	November 4, 2016	December 22, 2016
The leader of Team Galactic, Cyrus, attempts to create a new world at the Spear Pillar and encounters Giratina, which takes Cyrus to the Distortion World.
12	"The Magma Stone" "Kazan no Okiishi"	November 11, 2016	December 22, 2016
Following Cyrus's disappearance, Team Galactic's remnants, under Charon's leadership, awaken Heatran in Stark Mountain, but are opposed by Buck, Looker, and their Pokémon.
13	"The Uprising" "Hanran"	November 18, 2016	January 26, 2017
Team Plasma's castle rises out of the earth surrounding the Unova Pokémon League, but the Gym Leaders of Unova arrive to save the world from their and Ghetsis' evil ambitions.
14	"The Frozen World" "Kogoeru Sekai"	November 23, 2016	January 26, 2017
Gym Leader Drayden battles Team Plasma in Opelucid City, but things go awry when Colress unleashes his secret weapon on the city. Large indestructible icicles strengthened by the power of the Legendary Pokémon Kyurem swarm the city, and Drayden is eventually overwhelmed by Team's Plasma's forces.
15	"The King Returns" "Kikan"	December 2, 2016	January 26, 2017
Ghetsis attempts to freeze the world over with Kyurem, but N arrives with Reshiram to stop him. However, Ghetsis uses the DNA Splicers, fusing Reshiram with Kyurem. With his Pokémon under Kyurem's control, a friend of N's (the player character from Pokémon Black and White) comes to aid him alongside Zekrom.
16	"The Beauty Eternal" "Eien no Bi"	December 9, 2016	February 2, 2017
Lysandre, CEO of Lysandre Labs, goes about his day giving press speeches, meeting women and presenting his company's latest technology, all the while hiding a sinister plot from the people of Kalos: rebuilding and using the Ultimate Weapon to achieve his malicious goal of eternal beauty.
17	"The Investigation" "Sōsa"	December 16, 2016	February 2, 2017
Detective Looker and Mimi, an Espurr, pursue the masked Pokémon thief Essentia, suspecting that she is Emma, their kind and innocent assistant. With Mimi's help, Looker frees Emma from the Essentia suit's control.
18	"The Redemption" "Aganai"	December 23, 2016	February 2, 2017
Kalos' new champion (the male player character from Pokémon X and Y) is approached by AZ for battle while a mother tells her daughter AZ's story about his beloved Floette and the ultimate weapon that was used to end the Pokémon War. After the battle, AZ's lingering guilt finally leaves him, and his Floette returns to his side.
