= Kazue Kato =

Japanese manga artist (born 1980)

Kazue Kato 加藤和恵
- Born: July 20, 1980 (age 46) Tokyo
- Area: Manga artist
- Notable works: Blue Exorcist

Kazue Kato (Japanese: 加藤和恵, Hepburn: Katō Kazue; born July 20, 1980) is a Japanese manga artist. She debuted in 2000 with a one-shot in Akamaru Jump before publishing a full series in Monthly Shōnen Sirius. Following that series completion, she launched Blue Exorcist in Jump Square.

== Biography ==
Kazue Kato was born on July 20, 1980, in Tokyo. She has two younger siblings, a brother and a sister. In high school, she had aspirations to be an animator. However, her dad did not feel she was serious enough about it, so he sent her to college. However, she left college and decided to become a manga artist instead. After publishing several one-shots, she made her first full series, Robo to Usakichi. It was serialized in Monthly Shōnen Sirius from 2005 to 2007.

Following Robo to Usakichi's completion, she was approached by the editorial department of Jump Square to serialize a manga in the magazine. She eventually developed Blue Exorcist, which started serialization in Jump Square on April 4, 2009. The seventh volume of the series had an initial print run of one million copies; the series was the first manga in Jump Square to achieve such a feat. In the first half of 2017, the series was the eleventh best selling manga in Japan. The series has also been given numerous adaptations, including an anime series that ran for five seasons and a film.

In 2020, she did the character designs for the Godzilla Singular Point television series. In July 2021, she announced Blue Exorcist would be put on hiatus so she could launch a manga adaptation of Fuyumi Ono's Eizen Karukaya Kaiitan novel series.

== Influences ==
Kato has mentioned that the various authors and stories from the shōjo manga magazine Ribon were one of her early influences that motivated her to begin her career as a manga artist. She also mentioned Gosho Aoyama's Yaiba and the works of Katsuhiro Otomo. Kato has cited Kentaro Miura's Berserk as a major influence over her work, specifically the relationship between Guts, Griffith, and Casca.

== Works ==
=== Manga ===
- Boku to Usagi (僕と兎) (2000) (one-shot published in Akamaru Jump)
- Robo to Usakichi (ロボとうさ吉) (2005–2007) (serialized in Monthly Shōnen Sirius)
- Blue Exorcist (青の祓魔師, Ao no Ekusoshisuto) (2009–present) (serialized in Jump Square)
- Eizen Karukaya Kaiitan (営繕かるかや怪異譚) (2021–2022) (adaptation of the novel series by Fuyumi Ono, serialized in Jump Square)

=== Other ===
- Godzilla Singular Point (ゴジラ S.P ＜シンギュラポイント＞, Gojira Shingyura Pointo) (2021) (character designs)
