= Blue Exorcist =

Japanese manga series

- First tankōbon volume cover, featuring Rin Okumura

青の祓魔師(エクソシスト) (Ao no Ekusoshisuto)
- Genre: Adventure; Dark fantasy
- Manga
- Written by: Kazue Kato
- Published by: Shueisha
- English publisher: NA: Viz Media
- Imprint: Jump Comics SQ.
- Magazine: Jump Square
- English magazine: NA: Weekly Shonen Jump
- Original run: April 4, 2009 – present
- Volumes: 34
- Anime television series
- Directed by: Tensai Okamura (S1); Koichi Hatsumi (S2); Daisuke Yoshida (S3–4)
- Produced by: List: Hiroo Maruyama (S1); Kozue Kananiwa (S1); Shin Furukawa (S1); Takamitsu Inoue (S1); Satoshi Adachi (#1–12); Tetsuhito Motoyasu (#13–25); Tetsuya Endō (S2); Hiroshi Kamei (S2); Miho Matsumoto (S2); Natsumi Mori (S2); Takashi Takano (S2); Miho Matsumoto (S3–4); Akari Yanagawa (S3–4); Yuki Ogasawara (S3–4); Wataru Tanaka (S3–4); Hiroshi Kamei (S3–4)
- Written by: Ryōta Yamaguchi (S1); Toshiya Ōno (S2–4)
- Music by: Hiroyuki Sawano; Kohta Yamamoto (S2–4)
- Studio: A-1 Pictures (S1–2); Studio VOLN (S3–4)
- Licensed by: AUS: Madman Entertainment; BI: Crunchyroll UK and Ireland; NA: Aniplex of America; SEA: Muse Communication
- Original network: JNN (MBS, TBS) (S1–2); Tokyo MX, BS11, GTV, GYT, MBS, THK, UHB, RKB (S3–4)
- English network: NA: Neon Alley; US: Adult Swim (Toonami)
- Original run: April 17, 2011 – March 23, 2025
- Episodes: 73 + 3 OVAs
- Manga

Salaryman Exorcist: The Sorrows of Yukio Okumura
- Written by: Kazue Kato
- Illustrated by: Minoru Sasaki
- Published by: Shueisha
- Magazine: Jump SQ.19 (April 2013 – February 2015); Jump Square (April 2015 – April 2020)
- Original run: April 19, 2013 – April 3, 2020
- Volumes: 4
- Anime film
- Blue Exorcist: The Movie (2012)
- icon

Blue Exorcist (Japanese: 青の祓魔師(エクソシスト), Hepburn: Ao no Ekusoshisuto) is a Japanese manga series written and illustrated by Kazue Kato. The story revolves around Rin Okumura, a teenager who discovers that he and his twin brother Yukio are the sons of Satan, born from a human woman, and he is the inheritor of Satan's powers. When Satan kills their guardian, Rin enrolls at True Cross Academy to become an exorcist under Yukio's tutelage in order to defeat Satan. The manga has been serialized in Shueisha's shōnen manga magazine Jump Square since April 2009, with individual chapters collected in 34 tankōbon volumes as of May 2026. Viz Media has licensed the manga for English release in North America, with the first volume released in April 2011.

Blue Exorcist was adapted into an anime television series produced by A-1 Pictures, broadcast from April to October 2011. An anime film, Blue Exorcist: The Movie, premiered in December 2012. A second season, subtitled Kyoto Saga, aired from January to March 2017. A third season produced by Studio VOLN, subtitled Shimane Illuminati Saga, aired from January to March 2024. A fourth season was split in two cours; the first cours, subtitled Beyond the Snow Saga, aired from October to December 2024, while the second cours, subtitled The Blue Night Saga, aired from January to March 2025. The anime series has been licensed in English by Aniplex of America.

By December 2022, Blue Exorcist had over 25 million copies in circulation. The manga has been well received by readers, with sales having received a boost thanks to the anime's release.

== Synopsis ==
=== Setting ===
The world of Blue Exorcist consists of two dimensions, attached to each other as a mirror and its reflection. The first is the material world where humans live, Assiah (物質界(アッシャー), Asshā), and the other is Gehenna (虚無界(ゲヘナ), Gehena), the world of demons, which is ruled by Satan. Originally, a journey between the worlds, or even a contact between them, was impossible, however, any demon is able to pass to the dimension of Assiah through the possession of a living being in it. Even so, demons have historically wandered among humans unnoticed, visible only to people who have had contact with demons before.

In contrast, there are Exorcists, people who train to destroy demons who act in a damaging manner in Assiah. With more than two thousand years of existence, this group has several branches all over the world being secretly under the command of the Vatican itself and acting in a clandestine manner.

=== Plot ===
The story revolves around Rin Okumura, who, along with his younger twin Yukio Okumura, was raised by Father Shiro Fujimoto, an Exorcist. One day, Rin learns that he and Yukio are the sons of Satan. Witnessing Shiro dying to protect him, Rin draws the demon-slaying sword Kurikara (倶利伽羅), which restrains his demonic powers. From that moment on, Rin not only gains demonic features like fangs and a tail, but also the power to ignite into blue flames that destroy almost anything he touches.

Rin wishes to become an Exorcist like his guardian to become stronger and to defeat Satan. He enrolls at the prestigious True Cross Academy (正十字学園, Sei Jūji Gakuen), an exorcist cram school, which is actually the Japanese branch of the True Cross Order (正十字騎士團, Sei Jūji Kishidan), an international organization dedicated to protect Assiah from Gehenna. Much to his surprise, Rin finds that Yukio is already a veteran Exorcist and is one of his teachers. Thus begins Rin's journey to become an Exorcist, accompanied by his brother and his fellow students who quickly become his close friends.

== Production ==
Kazue Kato took inspiration from Terry Gilliam's The Brothers Grimm (2005), as she tried to work the angle of brothers fighting against monsters into a story. She eventually decided on making the story about demons and exorcists, thus conceiving Blue Exorcist. Due to exorcists being the main idea of the story, the manga features a lot of Biblical references. In an interview with Anime News Network, Kato said: "I should not run away from these references if I'm working in the Exorcist genre." An ending was planned by Kato but the exact length of the series has yet to be decided based on the manga's popularity in Japan.

In 2016, Kato stated, "I think there might be four more arcs. I have a rough storyline complete for the ending, but I haven't figured out all of the details. I have a few things where I'm not sure what to decide to do." In July 2021, Kato announced that the manga would enter on an eight-month hiatus to work on a six-chapter manga mini-series adaptation of Fuyumi Ono's Eizen Karukaya Kaiitan. The manga resumed publication one month later than planned, on May 2, 2022. In February 2026, Kato announced that the manga would take a four-month break starting on March 4 of the same year, to prepare for the final chapter, make changes to her work environment and prepare for the upcoming compiled book volumes. It resumed on July 3.

== Media ==
=== Manga ===
Blue Exorcist is written and illustrated by Kazue Kato. A prototype one-shot, titled Miyamauguisu House Case (深山鶯邸事件, Miyamauguisu-tei Jiken), was published in Shueisha's Jump Square on August 4, 2008. Blue Exorcist has been serialized in Jump Square since April 4, 2009. Shueisha has collected its chapters into individual tankōbon volumes. The first volume was released on August 4, 2009. As of May 1, 2026, 34 volumes have been published.

The series has been licensed by Viz Media for release in North America, with the first volume released under the Shōnen Jump Advance imprint on April 5, 2011. 28 volumes have been released as of November 14, 2023.

==== Spin-off ====
A spin-off series written by Kato and illustrated by Minoru Sasaki, focused on Rin's brother, Yukio, titled Salaryman Exorcist: The Sorrows of Yukio Okumura (サラリーマン祓魔師 奥村雪男の哀愁, Salaryman Futsumashi Okumura Yukio no Aishū), started in Jump SQ.19 on April 19, 2013. After the magazine ceased publication on February 19, 2015, the series was transferred to Jump Square, starting on April 4 of that same year. The series finished on April 3, 2020. Its chapters were collected in four tankōbon volumes, released from February 4, 2015, to June 4, 2020.

=== Anime ===
An anime adaption for the manga was announced in November 2010 on Shueisha's Jump Square official website. The anime was produced by A-1 Pictures with Hitoshi Okamura as the producer. Originally, the series was scheduled to air on April 10, 2011, on MBS; however, due to the March 11 Tōhoku earthquake and tsunami the series' broadcast was delayed a week later on April 17; the series was broadcast for 25 episodes until October 2 of that same year. The opening theme for the first 12 episodes is "Core Pride" by Uverworld, while the opening theme from episode 13 onwards is "In My World" by Rookiez is Punk'd. The ending theme for the first 12 episodes is "Take Off" by South Korean boy band 2PM, while the ending theme from episode 13 through episode 25 is "Wired Life" by Meisa Kuroki. An original video animation (OVA), titled Kuro Runs Away From Home (クロの家出, Kuro no Iede), was included with the series' fifth DVD release on October 26, 2011.

Aniplex of America announced they would simulcast the series in North America through video sites Hulu, Crunchyroll, Anime News Network and Netflix starting on April 20, 2011. Aniplex of America released the series on four DVDs from October 18, 2011, to June 29, 2012; the Kuro Runs Away From Home OVA was included with the series' "DVD Complete 1st Season" box set on July 9, 2013. The series began broadcasting in the United States and Canada on Viz Media's online network, Neon Alley, on October 2, 2012. It was broadcast on Adult Swim's Toonami programming block from February 23 to August 10, 2014; the series was rebroadcast on the same programming block starting on November 3, 2024. Muse Communication licensed the series in Southeast Asia, streaming it for a limited time on its YouTube channel until February 29, 2024.

==== Film ====
An anime film, Blue Exorcist: The Movie, was released on December 28, 2012, in Japan. The English dub cast reprised their roles for the movie.

==== Kyoto Saga ====
In June 2016, a second season, titled Blue Exorcist: Kyoto Saga, was announced and aired from January 7 to March 25, 2017. Koichi Hatsumi directed the sequel, while Toshiya Ōno wrote the scripts, Keigo Sasaki designed the characters, and Hiroyuki Sawano and Kohta Yamamoto composed the soundtrack. A-1 Pictures returned to produce the animation. The opening theme is "Itteki no Eikyō" (一滴の影響; lit. "Drop's Influence") by Uverworld, while the ending theme is "Kono Te de" (コノ手デ; lit. "With This Hand") by Rin Akatsuki. The series has been licensed by Aniplex of America in North America, and Muse Communication in Southeast Asia, streaming it for a limited time on its YouTube channel until February 29, 2024.

Kyoto Saga premiered in the United States on Adult Swim's Toonami programming block on May 18, 2025.

==== Shimane Illuminati Saga ====
In December 2022, it was announced that the anime would receive a new television series adaptation. It was later revealed to be a third season, titled Blue Exorcist: Shimane Illuminati Saga, which adapted volumes 10–15 of the original manga. The sequel was produced by Studio VOLN and directed by Daisuke Yoshida, with scripts written by Toshiya Ōno, character designs handled by Yurie Oohigashi, and music composed by Hiroyuki Sawano and Kohta Yamamoto. It aired from January 7 to March 24, 2024, on Tokyo MX and other networks. (Note: Tokyo MX lists the season premiere on January 6 at 24:30, which is effectively January 7 at 12:30 a.m. JST) The opening theme is "Eye's Sentry" by Uverworld, while the ending theme is "Gakkyū Nisshi" (学級日誌; lit. 'Class Diary') by Mulasaki-Ima. Muse Communication licensed the series in Southeast Asia.

Shimane Illuminati Saga premiered in the United States on Adult Swim's Toonami programming block on August 24, 2025.

==== Beyond the Snow / The Blue Night Sagas ====
In March 2024, at the AnimeJapan 2024 event, a fourth season was announced. In July 2024, it was announced that the staff from the Shimane Illuminati Saga would return for the season and that it would run for two cours; the first one, subtitled Beyond the Snow Saga (雪ノ果篇, Yuki no Hate-hen), aired from October 6 to December 22, 2024, and the second one, subtitled The Blue Night Saga (終夜篇, Yosuga-hen), aired from January 5 to March 23, 2025. For Beyond the Snow Saga, the opening theme is "Re Rescue", performed by Reol, and the ending theme is "Tsurara" (ツララ), performed by Yobahi. For The Blue Night Saga, the opening theme is "Tsūkaku" (痛覚; "Sense of Pain"), performed by Amazarashi, and the ending theme is "Overlap" (オーバーラップ, Ōbārappu), performed by Shiyui. Muse Communication licensed Beyond the Snow Saga in Southeast Asia.

The fourth season premiered in the United States on Adult Swim's Toonami programming block on November 9, 2025.

=== Light novels ===
Four light novels written by Aya Yajima, with illustrations provided by Kazue Kato, have been released by Shueisha under their Jump J-Books imprint. The first light novel, titled Blue Exorcist: Weekend Hero, was released on September 2, 2011. The second novel, Blue Exorcist: Home Sweet Home, was released on December 4, 2012. It focuses on past events, such as Rin, Yukio, Ryuji, Renzo, and Konekomaru's childhoods, as well as Juzo Shima and Mamushi Hojo's time as students at True Cross Academy. The third novel, titled Blue Exorcist: Bloody Fairytale, was released on March 4, 2014. The fourth novel, titled Blue Exorcist: Spy Game, was released on March 3, 2017.

=== Video games ===
A visual novel for PlayStation Portable, Ao no Exorcist: Genkoku no Labyrinth was released on April 26, 2012, by Bandai Namco Games.

A smartphone game, Blue Exorcist: Damned Chord was originally announced in December 2018; however in November 2020, it was announced that the game was canceled.

A 3D action RPG, Alterna Vvelt: Blue Exorcist Another Story (オルタナヴェルト -青の祓魔師 外伝-, Orutana Vueruto Ao no Ekusoshisuto Gaiden) was announced at Jump Festa 2024. It was released on smartphones on June 25, 2025, with a PC version to come later.

=== Other media ===
A stage play based on the series, titled Live Act Ao no Exorcist: Mashin no Rakuin, ran for nine performances at the Nippon Seinenkan hall in Tokyo's Shinjuku ward from May 11–17, 2012. Satoshi Owada directed and wrote scripts for the play. Main characters Rin and Yukio Okumura were portrayed by Ryou Kimura and Kimito Totani respectively.

== Reception ==
=== Manga ===
By November 2016, Blue Exorcist had over 15 million copies in circulation. By December 2022, the manga had over 25 million copies in circulation. The manga has been popular in Japan with the seventh volume receiving first print run of one million copies becoming the first Jump Square manga to reach such milestone. The release of the anime also drastically increased the manga's sales to the point that Shueisha decided to increase the print run for the seventh volume.

Critics have praised the Blue Exorcist manga, with Comic Book Bin reviewer Leroy Douresseaux feeling the first volume had potential, enjoying the comedy in the work and the characters and their interactions, recommending it to teen readers. Danica Davidson from Otaku USA felt that while the series employs disturbing storytelling, Rin's heroic traits despite being Satan's son make the plot more appealing to the readers. Kato's artwork has been praised by Anime News Network's Carlo Santos for the way each character has distinct traits while background images are well designed. Deb Aoki of About.com praised Kato's art and the series' "multi-dimensional world that melds European architecture, Japanese culture, modern technology and Tim Burton-esque whimsy", also stating that it is a "multicultural mishmash" of Harry Potter, Cirque du Soleil, Blade Runner and Alice in Wonderland, but she called the action scenes "a bit chaotic, and sometimes hard to follow".

=== Anime ===
Carl Kimlinger from Anime News Network emphasized how the execution was well-performed, resulting in entertaining episodes, especially its fight scenes, which were noted to be one of the anime's strongest points, and described it as "Great action, fun characters, and an occasional tug at the heart as well; every episode without fail is a blast". Sandra Scholes of Active Anime noted similarities to other series like Trinity Blood, Fullmetal Alchemist and Bleach, but wrote that the story and characters have "plenty of their own to tantalize us to watch."
