= List of Digimon films =

List of Digimon films
1999	Digimon Adventure
2000	Our War Game!
2000	Hurricane Touchdown!!
2000	Digimon Grand Prix!
2000	Digimon: The Movie
2001	Revenge of Diaboromon
2001	Battle of Adventurers
2002	Runaway Locomon
2002	Island of Lost Digimon
2003
2004
2005	Digital Monster X-Evolution
2006	The Digital World in Imminent Danger!
2006	Ultimate Power! Activate Burst Mode!!
2007
2008
2009
2010
2011
2012
2013
2014
2015	Tri. 1: Reunion
2016	Tri. 2: Determination
2016	Tri. 3: Confession
2017	Tri. 4: Loss
2017	Tri. 5: Coexistence
2018	Tri. 6: Future
2019
2020	Last Evolution – Kizuna
2021
2022
2023	The Beginning

Several films have been released in the Digimon franchise. Of those films, two short films animated completely in CGI have never been screened outside Japan, while Digital Monster X-Evolution, which was not related to any of the Digimon television series, was first broadcast on television. The other films are primarily hand-drawn and related to the television series. The first three films were localized into English and compiled into a single film, Digimon: The Movie. Subsequent films up to Digimon Frontier: Island of Lost Digimon were also released in English as well. The Digimon Adventure tri. film series, whose films were streamed worldwide with English subtitles on the same day as they were released in Japanese theaters, were also later released in dubbed versions outside Japan.

== Digimon Adventure films ==
=== Digimon Adventure ===
Digimon Adventure is the first Digimon Adventure film. It was released in Japan on March 6, 1999. It was released in the United States on October 6, 2000, as the first part of Digimon: The Movie.

=== Our War Game! ===
Digimon Adventure: Our War Game! is the second Digimon film. It was released in Japan on March 4, 2000. It was released in the United States on October 6, 2000, as the second part of Digimon: The Movie.

=== Hurricane Touchdown!! ===
Digimon Adventure 02: Hurricane Touchdown

Japanese name
- Kanji: デジモンアドベンチャー02: デジモンハリケーン上陸 / 超絶進化！！ 黄金のデジメンタル
Transcriptions
- Revised Hepburn: Dejimon Adobenchā Zero Tsū: Dejimon Harikēn Jouriku!! / Chouzetsu Shinka!! Ougon no Dejimentaru
- Directed by: Shigeyasu Yamauchi
- Written by: Reiko Yoshida
- Produced by: Makoto Toriyama; Makoto Yamashina; Hiromi Seki
- Starring: Reiko Kiuchi; Junko Noda; Rio Natsuki; Kōichi Tōchika; Taisuke Yamamoto; Miwa Matsumoto; Megumi Urawa; Kae Araki; Yuka Tokumitsu; Nami Miyahara; Tomomichi Nishimura; Aoi Tada
- Music by: Takanori Arisawa
- Release date: July 8, 2000
- Running time: 65 minutes
- Box office: $18.8 million

Digimon Adventure 02: Hurricane Touchdown!! (デジモンアドベンチャー02 前編・デジモンハリケーン上陸!! / 後編・超絶進化!!黄金のデジメンタル, Dejimon Adobenchā Zero Tsū Zenpen · Dejimon Harikēn Jouriku!! / Kōhen · Chouzetsu Shinka!! Ougon no Dejimentaru; lit. 'Digimon Adventure 02: Part 1 – Digimon Hurricane Landing!! / Part 2 – Supreme Evolution!! The Golden Digimentals') is a 2000 film and the third Digimon movie, released for the Toei Animation Summer 2000 Animation Fair. It was released in Japan on July 8, 2000. The film was screened in two parts, with Ojamajo Doremi #: The Movie screening in between. The film's ending theme song is "Stand By Me ~Hitonatsu no Bōken~" (スタンド・バイ・ミー～ひと夏の冒険～, Sutando Bai Mī ~Hitonatsu no Bōken~) by AiM. It was released in the United States on October 6, 2000, as the third part of Digimon: The Movie. The events of the film take place during the second season of Digimon Adventure 02.

While T.K. and Kari visit Mimi in New York City, Wendigomon captures Tai, Matt, Sora, Izzy, Mimi, and Joe. The two enlist Davis, Yolei, Cody, and their Digimon to come to the United States to fight him. On the way, Davis and the others meet Willis (ウォレス, Wallace), an American DigiDestined partnered with Terriermon. Willis reveals that he had two Digimon partners, the other being Kokomon (チョコモン, Chocomon), who had been corrupted by a virus. During battle, T.K. and Kari's Digimon, Seraphimon and Magnadramon, unlock two golden Digi-eggs for Davis and Willis to use, which Golden Armor Digivolves their partners into Magnamon and Rapidmon. The two defeat Wendigomon, allowing the older DigiDestined to return, and Davis' group returns to Japan. On the way home, Willis finds Kokomon's Digi-egg on the beach.

In the Japanese and uncut English versions, Willis only appeared in Digimon Hurricane Touchdown!! (the basis for the segment "Present Day" in Digimon: The Movie) and had no connection to the events depicted in Digimon Adventure ("Eight Years Ago") nor Our War Game! ("Four Years Later"). The 2000 English version rewrote Willis' backstory to include his involvement with Diaboromon to connect the films together.

In July 2023, Discotek Media announced plans to release both Digimon: The Movie and the individual films. The films were given new dubs featuring surviving members of the original cast, including Brian Donovan, Doug Erholtz, and Lara Jill Miller, as well as new cast members. It was released on December 17, 2024.

==== Cast ====
Character name		Voice actor		
Japanese	English	Japanese	English	
Japanese	English	Japanese	Fox Family Worldwide/Saban (2000)	Sound Cadence/Discotek (2024)
Daisuke Motomiya	Davis Motomiya	Reiko Kiuchi	Brian Donovan	Brian Donovan
V-mon	Veemon	Junko Noda	Derek Stephen Prince Steve Blum (Flamedramon/Raidramon/Magnamon)	
Miyako Inoue	Yolei Inoue	Rio Natsuki	Tifanie Christun	Jessica Peterson
Hawkmon	Hawkmon	Kōichi Tōchika	Neil Kaplan Steve Blum (Poromon)	Neil Kaplan Steve Blum (Poromon)
Iori Hida	Cody Hida	Megumi Urawa	Philece Sampler	Madeline Dorroh
Armadimon	Armadillomon	Megumi Urawa	Robert Axelrod Dave Mallow (Upamon) Tom Fahn (Digmon)	Wayne Grayson Tom Fahn (Digmon)
Hikari Yagami	Kari Kamiya	Kae Araki	Lara Jill Miller	Lara Jill Miller
Tailmon	Gatomon	Yuka Tokumitsu	Edie Mirman	Edie Mirman
Takeru Takaishi	T.K. Takaishi	Taisuke Yamamoto	Doug Erholtz Wendee Lee (young)	Doug Erholtz Wendee Lee (young)
Patamon		Miwa Matsumoto	Laura Summer Dave Mallow (Angemon/Seraphimon)	Laura Summer Bradley Gareth (Angemon/Seraphimon)
Wallace	Willis	Nami Miyahara	Bob Glouberman	Bob Glouberman
Terriermon		Aoi Tada	Mona Marshall Michael Sorich (Gargomon) Lex Lang (Rapidmon)	Mona Marshall Michael Sorich (Gargomon) Lex Lang (Rapidmon)
Chocomon	Kokomon	Mamiko Noto (young) Tomomichi Nishimura	Wendee Lee (young) Paul St. Peter	Wendee Lee (young) Paul St. Peter Cherami Leigh (Lopmon)
Sora Takenouchi		Yūko Mizutani	Colleen O'Shaughnessey	Colleen O'Shaughnessey
Yamato Ishida	Matt Ishida	Yūto Kazama	—N/a	Michael Reisz
Kōshirō Izumi	Izzy Izumi	Umi Tenjin	—N/a	Mona Marshall
Mimi Tachikawa		Ai Maeda	—N/a	Elsie Lovelock
Jō Kido	Joe Kido	Masami Kikuchi	—N/a	Eli Farmer
Driver	Male Driver 3A (Cabbie)	Kensuke Ōta	Jeff Nimoy	Jeff Nimoy
Taichi Yagami	Tai Kamiya	Toshiko Fujita	—N/a	Joshua Seth
—N/a	Boy Soccer Player 3A	—N/a	—N/a	Bryce Papenbrook
—N/a	Male Bandmember 3A	—N/a	—N/a	Clifford Chapin
—N/a	Male Bandmember 3B	—N/a	—N/a	Mark Allen Jr.
—N/a	Little Boys (Kids)	—N/a	Anna Garduno (Kid 1) Elizabeth Rice (Kid 2) Jeff Nimoy (Kid 3)	Michelle Marie (Little Boy 3A) Anna Garduno (Little Boy 3B) Alexis Tipton (Little Boy 3C)

A third English version, produced in Hong Kong and aired in Disney XD (Asia), features unknown voice actors. Clifford Chapin, Mark Allen Jr., Alexis Tipton, and Molly Zhang provide additional voices in Discotek's dub.

=== Digimon Adventure 3D: Digimon Grand Prix! ===
Digimon Grandprix!

Japanese name
- Kanji: デジモンアドベンチャー3D デジモングランプリ！
Transcriptions
- Revised Hepburn: Dejimon Adobenchā Gurandopuri!
- Directed by: Mamoru Hosoda
- Written by: Atsushi Maekawa
- Music by: Takanori Arisawa
- Release date: July 20, 2000
- Running time: 7 minutes

Digimon Adventure 3D: Digimon Grand Prix! (デジモンアドベンチャー3D デジモングランプリ！, Dejimon Adobenchā 3D Dejimon Gurandopuri!) is a 7-minute CG film produced by Toei Animation that was originally screened at the Time Machine of Dreams theme park attraction at Sanrio Puroland from July 20, 2000, to June 23, 2002, and Harmonyland. It made its theatrical debut on October 3, 2009, alongside Digimon Savers 3D: The Digital World in Imminent Danger!, GeGeGe no Kitaro: Kitaro's Ghost Train and Yaemon, The Locomotive as part of the Burst Out! 3D Toei Anime Festival. It was released on DVD along with the other three films on February 21, 2010, under the name "CG Toei Anime Festival" and was later included on a bonus disc in the Digimon THE MOVIES Blu-ray 1999–2006 compilation, released on January 9, 2015.

=== Digimon: The Movie ===
Digimon: The Movie
- Directed by: Mamoru Hosoda; Shigeyasu Yamauchi
- Written by: Bob Buchholz; Jeff Nimoy
- Produced by: Terri-Lei O'Malley
- Cinematography: Shigeru Ando
- Edited by: Gary Friedman; Douglas Purgason
- Music by: Udi Harpaz; Amotz Plessner
- Release date: October 6, 2000
- Running time: 88 minutes
- Budget: $5 million
- Box office: $16.6 million

Digimon: The Movie is a compilation film with footage from the featurettes Digimon Adventure (1999), Digimon Adventure: Our War Game! (2000), and Digimon Adventure 02: Part 1: Digimon Hurricane Touchdown!!/Part 2: Supreme Evolution!! The Golden Digimentals (2000). It was released in the U.S. and Canada by Fox Kids on October 6, 2000.

=== Revenge of Diaboromon ===
Digimon Adventure 02: Revenge of Diaboromon
- Directed by: Takahiro Imamura; Jeff Nimoy (English version)
- Written by: Reiko Yoshida
- Produced by: Hideki Yamashita; Makoto Shibazaki; Masaki Miyauchi; Tan Takaiwa; Tsutomu Tomari; Hiroyuki Sakurada
- Music by: Takanori Arisawa
- Release dates: March 3, 2001 (Japan); August 5, 2005 (US)
- Running time: 29 minutes
- Box office: 3,000,000,000 yen ($37.6 million)

Digimon Adventure 02: Revenge of Diaboromon (デジモンアドベンチャー02: ディアボロモンの逆襲, Dejimon Adobenchā Zero Tsū: Diaboromon no Gyakushū) is the fourth Digimon film. It was released in Japan on March 3, 2001, later released in the United States on August 5, 2005. Along with One Piece: Clockwork Island Adventure, the fourth Digimon film was shown as a double feature, which was called the Tōei Spring Anime Fair 2001. In total, they earned 3,000,000,000 Japanese yen.

Taking place three months during Digimon Adventure 02, the DigiDestined discover the return of Diaboromon. Tai, Matt, T.K. and Kari head to the Internet, where Diaboromon lures them into a trap. A swarm of Kuramon (Diaboromon's fresh form) appear and invade the Real World. Kuramon merges with Diaboromon to create a Super Ultimate level called Armageddemon. Though Omnimon and Imperialdramon fail to stop it, Omnimon gives his energy to Imperialdramon Fighter Mode, powering him up to Paladin Mode. Using his Omni Sword attack, Imperialdramon defeats Armageddemon, splitting him back up into Kuramon. With the power of the Digivices and cell phones, the Omni Sword is powered up, sending Kuramon back into the computer.

Discotek Media released the film on Blu-ray as part of the 2nd film collection alongside the two Digimon Tamers films.

==== Cast ====
Character name		Voice actor	
Japanese	English	Japanese	English
Japanese	English	Japanese	Studiopolis (2005)
Daisuke Motomiya	Davis Motomiya	Reiko Kiuchi	Brian Donovan
V-mon	Veemon	Junko Noda	Derek Stephen Prince
Ken Ichijouji		Romi Paku	Derek Stephen Prince
Wormmon		Naozumi Takahashi	Paul St. Peter
Diablomon	Diaboromon	—N/a	Paul St. Peter
Miyako Inoue	Yolei Inoue	Rio Natsuki	Tifanie Christun
Hawkmon		Kōichi Tōchika	Jeff Nimoy (2005); Neil Kaplan (2025) Steve Blum (Poromon)
Mimi Tachikawa		Ai Maeda	Philece Sampler
Iori Hida	Cody Hida	Megumi Urawa	Philece Sampler
Upamon		Megumi Urawa	Dave Mallow
Hikari Yagami	Kari Kamiya	Kae Araki	Lara Jill Miller
Tailmon	Gatomon	Yuka Tokumitsu	Edie Mirman
Takeru Takaishi	T.K. Takaishi	Taisuke Yamamoto	Doug Erholtz
Patamon		Miwa Matsumoto	Bridget Hoffman (2005); Laura Summer (2025) Dave Mallow (Angemon)
Taichi Yagami	Tai Kamiya	Toshiko Fujita	Jason Spisak (2005); Joshua Seth (2025)
Kōshirō Izumi	Izzy Izumi	Umi Tenjin	Mona Marshall
Jō Kido	Joe Kido	Masami Kikuchi	Michael Lindsay
Yamato Ishida	Matt Ishida	Yūto Kazama	Michael Reisz
Sora Takenouchi		Yūko Mizutani	Colleen O'Shaughnessey
Agumon		Chika Sakamoto	Tom Fahn
Gabumon		Mayumi Yamaguchi	Jeff Nimoy (2005); Kirk Thornton (2025)
Tentomon		Takahiro Sakurai	Jeff Nimoy
Omegamon	Omnimon	—N/a	Lex Lang; Jeff Nimoy (2005); Kirk Thornton (2025)
Paildramon		Junko Noda; Naozumi Takahashi	Derek Stephen Prince; Paul St. Peter

A second English version, produced in Hong Kong and aired on Disney XD (Asia), features an unknown voice cast.

=== Digimon Adventure tri. series ===
Digimon Adventure tri. is a six-part film series, taking place three years after the events of Digimon Adventure 02. When mysterious occurrences cause infected Digimon to appear in the real world, the original DigiDestined members face the changes that are happening in their own lives. Reunion was released in Japan on November 21, 2015, with an English dub version to be released in September 2016, Determination was released in Japan on March 12, 2016, and Confession released on September 24, 2016. Loss was released on February 25, 2017, Coexistence was released on September 30, 2017, and Future was released on May 5, 2018.

=== Digimon Adventure: Last Evolution – Kizuna ===
Logo of Digimon Adventure: Last Evolution – Kizuna

Digimon Adventure: Last Evolution – Kizuna is a film to directed by Tomohisa Taguchi, written by Akatsuki Yamatoya, and animated by Yumeta Company. Toei Animation is produced the movie. It marked the 20th anniversary of the debut of Digimon Adventure and was released in Japan on February 21, 2020.

== Digimon Tamers films ==
=== Battle of Adventurers ===
Digimon Tamers: Battle of Adventurers is the fifth Digimon film and the first Digimon Tamers film. It was released in Japan on July 14, 2001. It was released in the United States on September 16, 2005.

Discotek Media released the film on Blu-ray as part of the 2nd film collection alongside the other Tamers movie and Adventure 02's Revenge of Diaboromon movie.

=== Runaway Locomon ===
Digimon Tamers: Runaway Locomon originally released in Japan as Digimon Tamers: Runaway Digimon Express, is the sixth Digimon film and the second Digimon Tamers film. It was released in Japan on March 2, 2002. It was released in the United States on October 2, 2005.

Discotek Media released the film on Blu-ray as part of the 2nd film collection alongside the other Tamers movie and Adventure 02's Revenge of Diaboromon movie.

Chiaki Konaka states in his character notes (for Rika) that he "was not consulted" on Runaway Locomon, which possibly explains certain continuity errors. On this he also says: "However, ... Mr. Tetsuharu Nakamura [the director], [who was] an assistant director of the TV series... [and] Mr. Hiro Masaki,... a regular writer for the series... paid a great deal of attention to the psychological aspects of the series when completing the movie... I am very grateful to them for boldly illustrating the parts of Rika's family life that the TV series never explored."

== Digimon Frontier film ==
=== Digimon Frontier: Island of Lost Digimon ===
Digimon Frontier: Island of Lost Digimon originally released in Japan as Digimon Frontier: Ancient Digimon Revival (デジモンフロンティア: 古代デジモン復活!!, Dejimon Furontia Kodai Dejimon Fukkatsu!!) is the seventh Digimon film and the only Digimon Frontier film. It was released in Japan on July 20, 2002. It was released in the United States on November 27, 2005.

== Digimon Data Squad (Savers) films ==
=== The Digital World in Imminent Danger! ===
Digimon Savers 3D: The Digital World in Imminent Danger!

Japanese name
- Kanji: デジモンセイバーズ3D デジタルワールド 危機イッパツ!
Transcriptions
- Revised Hepburn: Dejimon Saibāzu 3D: Dejitaru Wārudo Kiki Ippatsu!
- Directed by: Nakamura Tetsuharu
- Music by: Takanori Arisawa
- Release date: July 8, 2006
- Running time: 7 minutes

Digimon Savers 3D: The Digital World in Imminent Danger! (デジモンセイバーズ3D デジタルワールド 危機イッパツ!, Dejimon Saibāzu 3D Dejitaru Wārudo Kiki Ippatsu!) is a 7-minute Digimon Savers CG film produced by Toei Animation that was originally screened at the Time Machine of Dreams theme park attraction at Sanrio Puroland from July 8, 2006, to July 2, 2008, and Harmonyland. It made its theatrical debut on October 3, 2009, alongside Digimon Adventure 3D: Digimon Grand Prix!, GeGeGe no Kitaro: Kitaro's Ghost Train and Yaemon, The Locomotive as part of the Burst Out! 3D Toei Anime Festival. It was released on DVD along with the other three films on February 21, 2010, under the name "CG Toei Anime Festival" and was later included on a bonus disc in the Digimon THE MOVIES Blu-ray 1999–2006 compilation, released on January 9, 2015.

=== Ultimate Power! Activate Burst Mode!! ===
Digimon Savers: Ultimate Power! Burst Mode Activated!!

Japanese name
- Kanji: デジモンセイバーズ: 究極パワー！ バーストモード発動！！
Transcriptions
- Revised Hepburn: Dejimon Seibāzu: Kyūkyoku Pawā! Bāsuto Mōdo Hatsudō!!
- Directed by: Tatsuya Nagamine
- Written by: Ryota Yamaguchi
- Music by: Keiichi Oku
- Release date: December 9, 2006
- Running time: 21 minutes
- Box office: $850,000

Digimon Savers: Ultimate Power! Burst Mode Activated!! (デジモンセイバーズ THE MOVIE 究極パワー！バーストモード発動！！, Dejimon Seibāzu za Mubī Kyūkyoku Pawā! Bāsuto Mōdo Hatsudō!!) is the ninth Digimon film and the second Digimon Savers film. It was released on December 9, 2006, by Toei Animation based on the series Digimon Data Squad.

The plot revolves around Agumon, Gaomon and Lalamon, whose partners are put into an eternal sleep, along with the rest of the humans, because of a mysterious thorn that spread throughout the city. After saving Rhythm, a Digimon in the form of a young girl, they learn from her that the thorns are the work of an Ultimate Digimon, named Algomon, and the four set out for his castle to confront him.

== Other films ==
=== Digital Monster X-Evolution ===
Digital Monster X-Evolution
- Directed by: Hiroyuki Kakudou
- Written by: Kazunori Itō; Miwa Kawasaki
- Produced by: Atsutoshi Umezawa
- Starring: Minami Takayama; Chika Sakamoto; Hideyuki Tanaka; Masako Nozawa; Mayumi Yamaguchi; Junko Noda
- Edited by: Shigeru Nishiyama
- Music by: Takehiko Gokita
- Production companies: Toei Animation; Imagi Animation Studios
- Release date: January 3, 2005
- Running time: 77 minutes
- Countries: Japan; Hong Kong
- Language: Japanese
- Budget: $2.5 million

Digital Monster X-Evolution (デジタルモンスター ゼヴォリューション, Dejitaru Monsutā Zevoryūshon) is the eighth Digimon film, and the first to air originally on Japanese television. It aired on January 3, 2005, at 7:15 am. UTC+9/JST on the Fuji TV network. On August 1, 2020, as part of DigiFes 2020, Toei Animation streamed Digital Monster X-Evolution on their YouTube channel, though it lacked subtitles.

It was based on the Digimon Chronicle merchandise line.

Digital Monster X-Evolution is also the first and, so far, only Digimon movie to be done entirely in CGI (CGI animation by Imagi Animation Studios), as well as the only Digimon movie not related to one of the Digimon anime series.

In the Digital World, the overpopulation of Digimon forces the world's creator, the supercomputer Yggdrasil to launch the X-Program which exterminates ninety-eight percent of all Digimon. Creating a smaller, new Digital World via Project Ark, Yggdrasil learns a small group of Digimon have gained a vaccine called the X-Antibody, that makes them immune to the X-Program, and upgrades them with new abilities and appearances. Yggdrasil dispatches its guards, the Royal Knights, to exterminate the X-Digimon. The Royal Knights consists of the merciless, loyal Omnimon, his best friend Gallantmon who questions Yggdrasil's motives, and the quiet Magnamon.

Dorumon, a dragon-like Digimon and X-Antibody carrier, does not understand the prejudice from other Digimon. He is targeted by a Leomon for his X-Antibody, but Leomon is struck by lightning and dies, asking Dorumon to live for him. Omnimon is summoned to a meeting between regular Digimon and X-Digimon, but he exterminates all of them save WarGreymon X and a Tokomon. The two crashland near a temple where Dorumon lives, WarGreymon X leaving Tokomon in Dorumon's care whilst he lures Omnimon away. Dorumon witnesses Omnimon exterminate a herd of Digimon who oppose Yggdrasil's will before being targeted himself. WarGreymon X and MetalGarurumon X arrive, but the latter is killed, though not before giving his X-Antibody to a wounded Tokomon.

Dorumon digivolves into his Champion-level Dorugamon, but Gallantmon arrives, revealing to Omnimon that Project Ark's second phase involves wiping out all Digimon, something which he refuses to participate in. Omnimon and Gallantmon duel, but Gallantmon allows himself to be killed so he can discern the truth, leaving Omnimon confused. Magnamon capture Dorugamon on Yggdrasil's command, revealing Dorumon is an experiment. Data is extracted from Dorugamon, used to create an army of DexDoruGreymon while Dorugamon is dumped in a wrecking yard where he is found by resistance members Mummymon and Wizardmon. Yggdrasil's horde attacks the group's base, but WarGreymon X and a revived MetalGarurumon X help protect it. Dorugamon awakens, digivolving into DoruGreymon, resembling the attacking horde. Gallantmon returns as an X-Digimon, opening a portal for DoruGreymon to confront Yggdrasil.

DoruGreymon confronts Magnamon and a disillusioned Omnimon. DoruGreymon digivolves into his Mega-level Alphamon, a legendary missing Royal Knight. Alphamon and Omnimon join forces to face Yggdrasil, but the loyal Magnamon warns his master of their arrival. In Yggdrasil's core, the Knights get nowhere with answers, and have to battle Alphamon's counterpart Dexmon. Alphamon impales himself and Dexmon using his own sword, and gives his X-Antibody to Omnimon, who successfully slays Yggdrasil. In the rebooted Digital World, Omnimon and Gallantmon muse over Yggdrasil's choices, concluding it merely wanted to live in the Digital World but it was too complex for it. Alphamon survives as Dorumon, reuniting with Tokomon.
