= Digimon Adventure: Our War Game! =

2000 anime film

- Film poster

Japanese name
- Kanji: デジモンアドベンチャー ぼくらのウォーゲーム!
- Literal meaning: Digimon Adventure: Children's War Game!
Transcriptions
- Revised Hepburn: Dejimon Adobenchā Bokura no Wō Gēmu!
- Directed by: Mamoru Hosoda
- Screenplay by: Reiko Yoshida
- Based on: Digimon by Akiyoshi Hongo
- Produced by: Hiromi Seki
- Starring: Toshiko Fujita; Chika Sakamoto; Yūto Kazama; Mayumi Yamaguchi
- Cinematography: Motoi Takahashi
- Edited by: Sinichi Fukumitsu
- Music by: Takanori Arisawa
- Production company: Toei Animation
- Distributed by: Toei Company
- Release date: March 4, 2000
- Running time: 40 minutes
- Country: Japan
- Language: Japanese
- Box office: ¥2.16 billion

Digimon Adventure: Our War Game! (Japanese: デジモンアドベンチャー ぼくらのウォーゲーム!, Hepburn: Dejimon Adobenchā Bokura no Wō Gēmu!), also known as Digimon Adventure: Children's War Game!, is a 2000 Japanese anime short film directed by Mamoru Hosoda and produced by Toei Animation. A part of the Digimon media franchise, Our War Game is a sequel to the 1999–2000 anime television series Digimon Adventure and is the second Digimon film overall. The film premiered in Japan on March 4, 2000, as part of the Toei Anime Fair (being screened alongside One Piece: The Movie); in North America, portions of Our War Game were included in the 2000 film Digimon: The Movie. Hosoda has cited Our War Game! as a major influence on his 2009 film Summer Wars, with critics noting numerous similarities between the films. The events of the film take place after Digimon Adventure.

== Plot ==
Following the return of the DigiDestined from the Digital World, (Note: As depicted in Digimon Adventure.) Izzy discovers a corrupted Digimon on the Internet that grows by consuming data. He rushes over to Tai's apartment, where they observe its consumption disrupt computer systems across Japan. Tai and Izzy are contacted by their Digimon partners Agumon and Tentomon from the Digital World; they battle the corrupted Digimon, but are defeated.

With the local PSTN crashed, Tai and Izzy attempt to contact the other DigiDestined by an emergency voicemail system, but most of the DigiDestined are unavailable. Fortunately, they are able to contact Matt and T.K., who are visiting their grandmother in rural Shimane. Matt and T.K.'s Digimon partners Gabumon and Patamon join the fight, but are quickly defeated by the enemy.

The enemy Digimon, having evolved into Diaboromon, creates thousands of duplicates of itself and hacks The Pentagon to launch an LGM-118 Peacekeeper missile aimed at an unknown target. Izzy deduces that Diaboromon is playing a guessing game, where by defeating the original Diaboromon, the missile won't activate its fuse. Upon entering the area with thousands of Diaboromon, WarGreymon and MetalGarurumon are overwhelmed by their attacks, not helped by them being slowed down as a result of thousands of e-mails being sent to Tai and Izzy by other children observing the battle on their computers around the world.

Desperate, Tai and Matt magically enter their computers, and rally their Digimon to jointly evolve into Omnimon and defeat the duplicates. With only mere seconds left until the missile hits, Izzy forwards the thousands of emails to the original Diaboromon, slowing him enough to be defeated by Omnimon. With Diaboromon vanquished, the disarmed missile crashes harmlessly into Tokyo Bay.

== Cast ==
Character name		Voice actor		
Japanese	English	Japanese	English	
Japanese	English	Japanese	Fox Family Worldwide/Saban (2000)	Sound Cadence/Discotek (2024)
Taichi Yagami	Taichi "Tai" Kamiya	Toshiko Fujita	Joshua Seth	Joshua Seth
Sora Takenouchi		Yūko Mizutani	Colleen O'Shaughnessey	Colleen O'Shaughnessey
Yamato "Matt" Ishida		Yūto Kazama	Michael Reisz	Michael Reisz
Koshiro "Izzy" Izumi		Umi Tenjin	Mona Marshall	Mona Marshall
Mimi Tachikawa		Ai Maeda	Philece Sampler	Elsie Lovelock
Takeru "T.K." Takaishi		Hiroko Konishi	Wendee Lee	Wendee Lee
Joe Kido		Masami Kikuchi	Michael Lindsay	Eli Farmer
Hikari Yagami	Kari Kamiya	Kae Araki	Lara Jill Miller	Lara Jill Miller
Agumon	Agumon	Chika Sakamoto	Tom Fahn	Tom Fahn
Agumon	Greymon	Chika Sakamoto	Michael Lindsay	Bradley Gareth
Agumon	MetalGreymon	Chika Sakamoto	Joseph Pilato	Bradley Gareth
Agumon	WarGreymon	Chika Sakamoto	Lex Lang	Lex Lang
Gabumon		Mayumi Yamaguchi	Kirk Thornton	Kirk Thornton
Piyomon	Biyomon	Atori Shigematsu	Tifanie Christun	Cherami Leigh
Tentomon		Takahiro Sakurai	Jeff Nimoy	Jeff Nimoy
Palmon		Shihomi Mizowaki	Anna Garduno	Anna Garduno
Gomamon		Junko Takeuchi	R. Martin Klein	R. Martin Klein
Patamon		Miwa Matsumoto	Laura Summer	Laura Summer
Tailmon	Gatomon	Yuka Tokumitsu	Edie Mirman	Edie Mirman
TV Announcer	Newsman	Hiroaki Hirata	Ralph Garman	Jason Marnocha
Gennai		Jōji Yanami	Mike Reynolds	Jason Marnocha
Taichi's Mother	Yuuko Kamiya	—N/a	Dorothy Elias-Fahn	Dorothy Elias-Fahn
Sora's Mother	Toshiko Takenouchi	—N/a	Elizabeth Rice	Marissa Lenti
—N/a	Grocery Girl	—N/a	Tifanie Christun	Marissa Lenti
Chisato (Birthday Girl)		—N/a	Tifanie Christun	Madeline Dorroh
Noriko (Party Girl 1)		—N/a	Wendee Lee	Wendee Lee
Kinu (Matt and T.K.'s Grandmother)		—N/a	Philece Sampler	Elsie Lovelock
—N/a	Female Shopper 2A	—N/a	—N/a	Kayleigh McKee
—N/a	Female Shopper 2B	—N/a	—N/a	Molly Zhang
—N/a	Older Brother 2A	—N/a	—N/a	Bryce Papenbrook
—N/a	Little Brother 2A	—N/a	—N/a	Molly Zhang
—N/a	Phone Operators	—N/a	Edie Mirman (Recorded Operator) Bob Buchholz (Voice Mail Operator)	Edie Mirman (Recorded Operator)
—N/a	Male Neighbor 2A	—N/a	—N/a	R. Martin Klein
—N/a	Female Neighbor 2A	—N/a	—N/a	Peggy O'Neal
—N/a	Male Elderly Neighbor 2B	—N/a	—N/a	David Lodge
Sho (Uncle Al/Andy)		—N/a	Bob Buchholz	Bob Buchholz
—N/a	Floyd	—N/a	Jeff Nimoy	Jeff Nimoy
—N/a	Elderly Husband 2A (Barney)	—N/a	Jeff Nimoy	Jeff Nimoy
Yasuko (Aunt Bea)		—N/a	Anna Garduno	Anna Garduno
—N/a	Professor	—N/a	Neil Kaplan	Neil Kaplan
Kuramon		—N/a	Brianne Siddall	Brianne Siddall
Diaboromon		—N/a	Paul St. Peter	Paul St. Peter
Miko		—N/a	Michael Sorich	Michael Sorich
—N/a	Yolei Inoue	—N/a	—N/a	Jessica Peterson

Kayleigh McKee, Valory Pierce, Michelle Marie, Peggy O'Neal, Clifford Chapin, Mark Allen Jr., Alexis Tipton, Molly Zhang, R. Martin Klein, Bryce Papenbrook, Tom Fahn, and Eli Farmer provide additional voices in Discotek's dub.

== Production ==
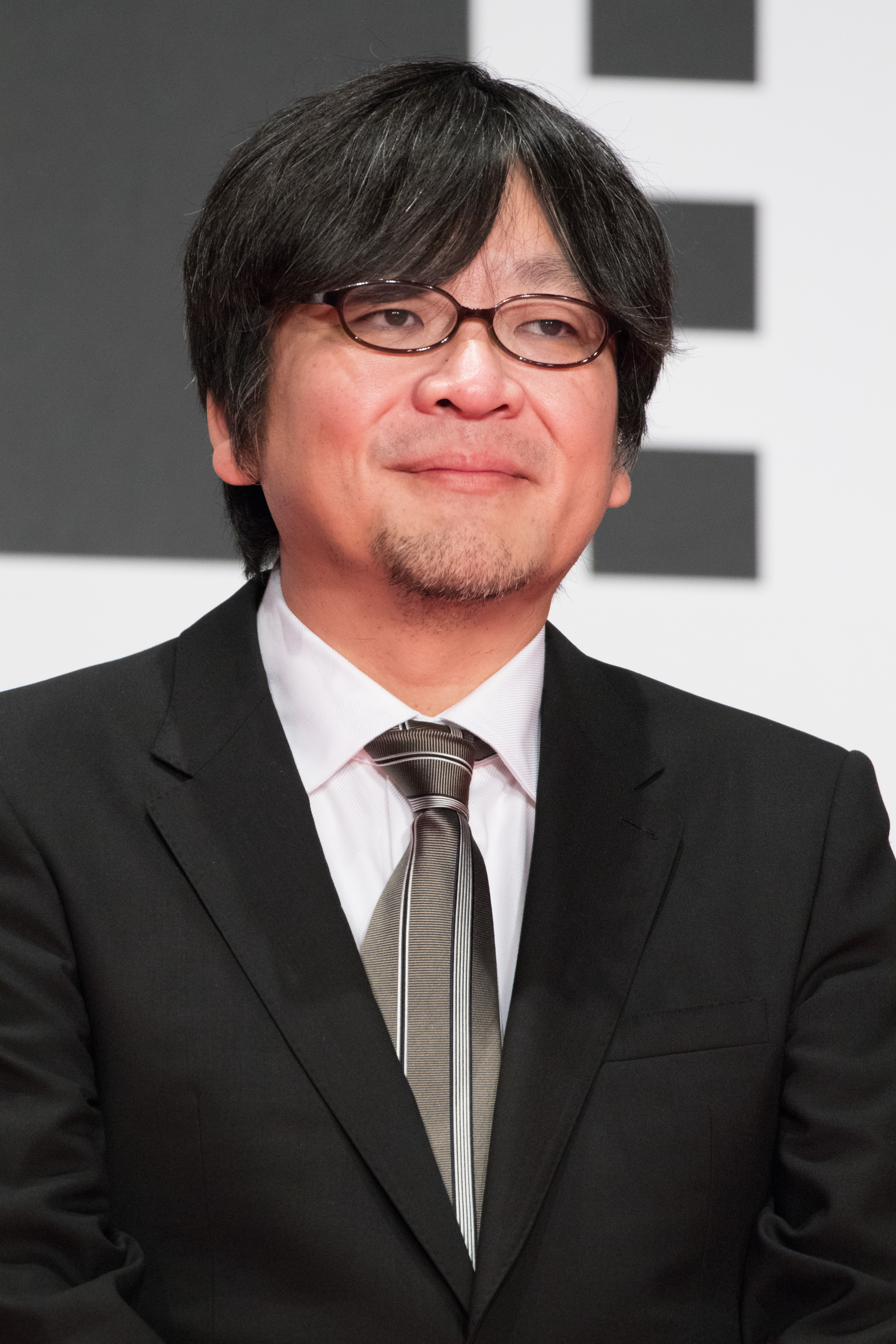
Our War Game director Mamoru Hosoda

Our War Game was directed by Mamoru Hosoda, written by Reiko Yoshida, and produced by Toei Animation. It is the second of two Digimon movies directed by Hosoda, following 1999's Digimon Adventure. Hosoda was given both Digimon films to direct by the company after he expressed a desire to make movies. Hosoda pitched two plots for the film: a road movie inspired by Midnight Run in which Kamiya and an original character travel to Okinawa, and a WarGames-inspired film in which the protagonist saves the world without leaving their home. Toei selected the latter concept. In early drafts of the script, Our War Game focused on a plot where the Year 2000 problem was caused by a Digimon. Hosoda stated that he wished to use the film to make the problem more understandable for children, but later abandoned the concept, believing the film would become dated after the year 2000 had passed; references to the Year 2000 problem nonetheless appear in some promotional materials for the film.

Constrained by the 40 minute runtime of Our War Game and seeking to make a film less serious than Digimon Adventure, Hosoda created Our War Game as a "childish, simple story where you just have to enjoy the thrill." Noting that he "couldn't make a great emotional story" in 40 minutes, he narrowed the focus of the film from the television anime series' ensemble cast of eight characters and their Digimon partners to just four core characters – Kamiya, Ishida, Izumi, and Takaishi. Inspired by the 1994 film Speed, he structured the film around a countdown to add suspense, with the events of the film occurring approximately in real time.

The film's soundtrack is composed by Takanori Arisawa, who composed the soundtrack for the Digimon television anime series. Maurice Ravel's Boléro and "When Johnny Comes Marching Home" are used as motifs, the latter of which was included by Hosoda as a reference to its use in the bomb run scene in Dr. Strangelove. The insert song "Requiem", which is sung during the climax by The Little Singers of Tokyo, is a revision of "Pie Jesu", a traditional Catholic hymn. "Butter-Fly" by Kōji Wada is used as the film's opening theme song, while "Sakuhin No. 2 "Haru" I Chōchō ~ Bokura no War Game!" by AiM is used as the ending theme. The film's soundtrack is included on the album Digimon Adventure 02 Uta to Ongaku Shū Ver.1.

== Release ==
Our War Game was released in theaters in Japan on March 4, 2000. The film was released on the same day as One Piece: The Movie as part of the Spring 2000 Toei Anime Fair; limited edition Digimon Carddass cards were included with advance ticket purchases for the film. The film grossed a total of ¥2.16 billion at the box office.

The film was released on VHS for rental on July 14, 2000, and for purchase on November 21, 2000. A DVD collecting Our War Game and the 1999 film Digimon Adventure was released on October 13, 2000, for rental, and on January 21, 2001, for purchase. The film was released for free on YouTube from March 22 to April 16, 2018, and on Bandai Channel from May 3 to May 9, 2020.

In North America, footage from Our War Game was edited with footage from the films Digimon Adventure (1999) and Digimon Adventure 02: Digimon Hurricane Landing!! / Transcendent Evolution!! The Golden Digimentals (2000) to create Digimon: The Movie, which was released in theaters on October 6, 2000.

In July 2023, Discotek Media announced plans to release both Digimon: The Movie and the individual films. The films were given new English dubs featuring surviving members of the original cast, including Joshua Seth, Michael Reisz, Mona Marshall and Lara Jill Miller, as well as newly cast members. It was released on December 17, 2024.

== Reception and legacy ==
In Anime Impact: The Movies and Shows that Changed the World of Japanese Animation, critic Geoffrey G. Thew assesses Our War Game favorably. He notes that the theatrical release Our War Game immediately preceded the release of the 2000 television anime series Digimon Adventure 02, which introduced a new central cast of characters; he argues that Our War Game "plays heavily on the audience's nostalgia" for the original cast of Digimon Adventure, noting that "without our emotional investment ... the film would be little more than eye candy."

Our War Game is regarded as a "blueprint" for Hosoda's 2009 film Summer Wars, with critics noting similarities in plot, visuals, and thematic material between the films. The anime magazine Neo stated that Our War Game is "plainly a prototype" of Summer Wars, and Thew argues in Anime Impact that Summer Wars is an effective remake of Our War Game "without any of the constraints of the Digimon license." Thew asserts that Our War Game and Summer Wars "speak to how the world (and Internet) changed in the decade between the two films. Our War Game is about the then-novel ideal of connecting with old friends over the internet, whereas Summer Wars explores the idea of getting to know total strangers intimately–an equally novel idea at the time the film was made." Hosoda has stated that Our War Game "kind of started my idea for Summer Wars," noting that Summer Wars "became the feature-length version of that idea" and allowed him to explore material he was unable to in Our War Game's 40 minute runtime.

Critics have cited the 1983 film WarGames as an influence on Our War Game, with Thew noting that both films share a title and a plot of "a rogue AI hijacking the Internet to spread chaos and potentially destroy the world, only to be stopped by some kids on their computers."

In other Digimon media, Diaboromon returns as the antagonist of the 2001 film Digimon Adventure 02: Revenge of Diaboromon, which contains visual callbacks to Our War Game. The first appearance of Omnimon in the 2020 reboot of Digimon Adventure similarly contains visual callbacks to Our War Game.
