= Joshua Seth =

American magician

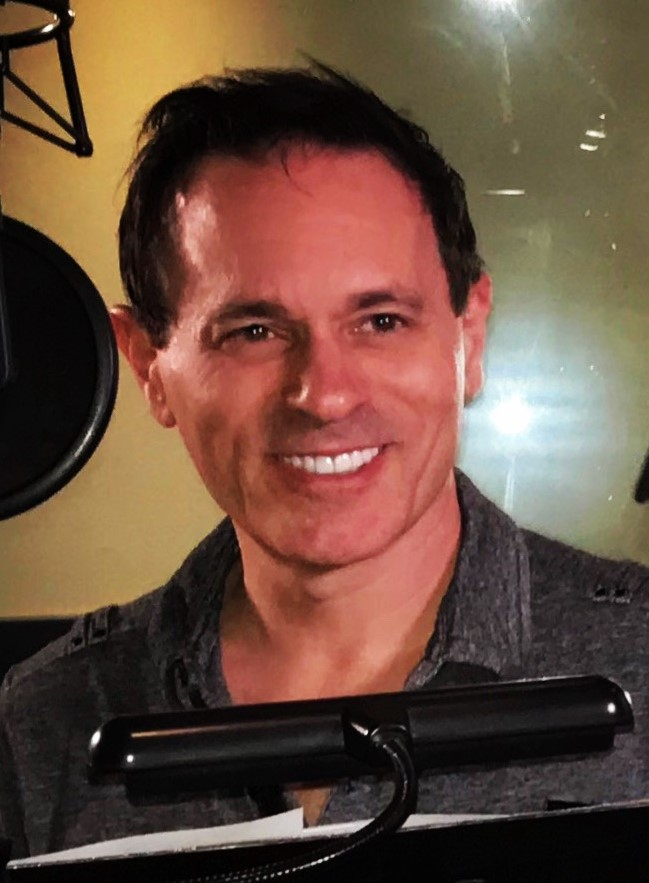
- Seth in 2018
- Born: Joshua Seth Freedman; Kent, Ohio, U.S.
- Occupations: Voice actor, comedian, author, motivational speaker
- Agent: Key Artist Group
- Spouse: Suzy Seth (m. 2009; div. 2018)
- Children: 2
- Website: https://JoshuaSeth.com

Joshua Seth Freedman is an American voice actor, comedian, motivational speaker, and author.

== Biography ==
Seth was born in Kent, Ohio to Barbara Freedman (née Zapiler), a therapist. After graduating from Theodore Roosevelt High School in 1987, he went to New York University Tisch School of the Arts and received his BFA in 1991. As a child, Seth attended several experimental programs at Kent State University where he was admitted at the age of eight. Later, he attended Hampshire College and the New York University's film school Tisch School of the Arts where he trained as a performing artist. He has voiced many popular anime characters, including Taichi "Tai" Kamiya in Digimon Adventure series. He was the announcer of "Kids WB's Aftertoons Show" block and "Saturdays: Unleashed" block.

He retired from voice acting in 2006 to focus on his other works.

From 2006 to 2020, Seth toured the world as a mentalist and magician. He has won awards from Hollywoodʼs Magic Castle, appeared in five of his own TV specials in Japan and South Korea and performed at over 2,000 events in over 30 countries.

Between 2016 and 2018, he came out of voice acting retirement to star in all of the Digimon Adventure tri. movies, recorded in Hollywood, CA. He then reprised his role in Digimon Adventure: Last Evolution Kizuna in 2020.

He returned to non-Digimon voice acting (having retired from voice acting, with the exception of Digimon) in December 2022 with the role of Kaneda in The Prince of Tennis.

Seth is also a motivational speaker and the author of a book on peak performance called Finding Focus in a Changing World.

He lives in St. Petersburg, Florida, with his two children, Tiger and Nikita.

== Filmography ==
=== Animated series English dubbing ===
- Arc the Lad - Elk
- The Big O - Cop
- The Black Angel - Kosugi's Guard
- Cowboy Bebop - McIntyre
- Cyborg 009: The Cyborg Soldier - Joe Shimamura/Cyborg 009
- Daigunder - Ryugu
- Digimon Adventure - Taichi "Tai" Kamiya, Motimon, Tentomon (ep.1), Pabumon, Pumpkinmon
- Digimon Adventure 02 - Taichi "Tai" Kamiya. Motimon, Tai's son
- Digimon Tamers - Kumbhiramon
- Digimon Frontier - Wizardmon, Teppei, Yutaka Himi
- Dual! Parallel Trouble Adventure - Kazuki Yotsuga
- Duel Masters - Shobu Kirifuda (Season One)
- Eagle Riders - Additional Voices
- éX-Driver - Souichi Sugano
- Flint the Time Detective - Unita, Additional Voices
- Ghost in the Shell: Stand Alone Complex - Omba (Ep. 9 & 11)
- Giant Robo - Daisaku Kusama
- Honeybee Hutch - Hutch
- IGPX - Takeshi Noa (micro-series only)
- Last Exile - Dio Eraclea
- Little Women - Theodore "Laurie" Laurence
- Macross Plus - Additional Voices
- Moldiver - Nozomu Ozora
- Nightwalker: The Midnight Detective - Schoolboy
- Orguss - Additional Voices
- Pilot Candidate - Zero Enna
- Pokémon - Kids WB Announcer
- The Return of Dogtanian - Philippe
- Rurouni Kenshin - Eiji Mishima
- Saint Tail - Asuka Jr.
- Samurai Girl Real Bout High School - Daisaku Kamiya
- Simsala Grimm - Doc Croc (Saban dub)
- Speed Racer X - Sparky
- Tenchi in Tokyo - Additional Voices
- The Prince of Tennis - Kenada
- Tokyo Pig - Spencer Weinberg-Takahama
- Transformers: Robots in Disguise - Carl
- Trigun - Young Knives
- The Twelve Kingdoms - Ikuya Asano
- Urda - Alan
- Vampire Princess Miyu - Helmsman, Young Maki, Yang
- Wolf's Rain - Hige
- X - Additional Voices
- Yukikaze - Ito
- Zatch Bell! - Maruss
- Zenki - Akira, Goki

=== Animated films English dubbing ===
- DNA Sights 999.9 - Tetsuro Daiba
- Digimon: The Movie - Taichi "Tai" Kamiya
- Akira - Tetsuo Shima (Pioneer dub)
- Cardcaptor Sakura: The Sealed Card, Leave It to Kero (short) - Takashi Yamazaki
- Mobile Suit Gundam F91 - Arthur Jung
- Digimon Adventure tri. - Taichi "Tai" Kamiya, Motimon
- Digimon Adventure: Last Evolution Kizuna - Taichi "Tai" Kamiya
- Digimon Adventure (standalone dub) - Taichi "Tai" Kamiya
- Digimon Adventure: Our War Game! (standalone dub) - Taichi "Tai" Kamiya
- Digimon Adventure 02: Digimon Hurricane Touchdown!! / Transcendent Evolution! The Golden Digimentals (standalone dub) - Taichi "Tai" Kamiya
- Digimon Adventure 02: Revenge of Diaboromon (2025 partial redub) - Taichi "Tai" Kamiya

=== Animations ===
- All Grown Up! - Yu-Got
- The Batman - Kids WB Announcer
- Jin Jin and the Panda Patrol - Additional Voices
- The Little Polar Bear - Lemming #1
- Saban's Adventures of Oliver Twist - Additional Voices
- Totally Spies! - Arnold
- Wow! Wow! Wubbzy! - Additional Voices

=== Films ===
- 50 First Dates - Painter (uncredited)
- Gorgeous - Additional Voices
- Racing Stripes - Additional Voices
- The SpongeBob SquarePants Movie - Royal Crown Polisher

=== Video games ===
- Ape Escape: On the Loose - Jake (US English version)
- Digimon Rumble Arena - Taichi "Tai" Kamiya (English version)
- JumpStart - Pierre, C.J.
- JumpStart Advanced 1st Grade - Jimmy Bumples
- Stonekeep - Grug, Ice Sharga Guard, Tiny Sharga
- Xenosaga Episode II: Jenseits von Gut und Bose - chaos, Hermann (English version)
- Xenosaga Episode III: Also sprach Zarathustra - chaos (English version)
