= Digimon: The Movie =

2000 film by Mamoru Hosoda and Shigeyasu Yamauchi

- Theatrical release poster
- Directed by: Mamoru Hosoda; Shigeyasu Yamauchi
- Screenplay by: Bob Buchholz; Jeff Nimoy
- Based on: Digimon Adventure, Digimon Adventure: Our War Game! and Digimon Adventure 02: Digimon Hurricane Landing!! / Transcendent Evolution!! The Golden Digimentals by Reiko Yoshida; Digimon by Akiyoshi Hongo
- Produced by: Terri-Lei O'Malley
- Starring: Lara Jill Miller; Joshua Seth
- Cinematography: Shigeru Ando
- Edited by: Douglas Purgason; Gary A. Friedman
- Music by: Udi Harpaz; Amotz Plessner
- Production companies: Toei Animation; Saban Entertainment
- Distributed by: 20th Century Fox (Note: Released under the Fox Kids Movies label)
- Release date: October 6, 2000 (United States)
- Running time: 88 minutes
- Countries: Japan; United States
- Language: English
- Budget: $5 million
- Box office: $16.6 million

Digimon: The Movie is a 2000 anime science fiction action film produced by Saban Entertainment and distributed by 20th Century Fox as part of the Digimon franchise. The film utilized footage from the short films Digimon Adventure (1999), Digimon Adventure: Our War Game! (2000), and Digimon Adventure 02: Hurricane Touchdown!! (2000), while the film's events take place during Digimon Adventure (1999–2000) and Digimon Adventure 02 (2000–01).

Production commenced in 2000 after Fox sought to bring a feature film to the Digimon franchise. Only three seasonal short films were produced for the series in Japan, which Fox was contractually obligated to produce as one cohesive film by Toei Animation. Due to the drastically different plots and budget restraints, more than 40 minutes of scenes from the individual shorts were cut to save time and introduced several changes in tone, dialogue, and plot. Owing to the number of changes made, it is considered an original work by the press.

Digimon: The Movie was released in the United States on October 6, 2000, by 20th Century Fox and was a moderate box office success, grossing over $16 million worldwide (equivalent to over $29 million in 2022) against a production budget of $5 million. Despite negative critical reviews, the film had a more positive reception from both fans and audiences, and has since garnered a small cult following.

== Plot ==
=== Angela Anaconda short ===
Angela Anaconda and her friends line up to watch Digimon: The Movie, but Nanette Manoir and her friends cut in line and Mrs. Brinks blocks her view of the screen. Angela imagines herself Digivolving (Note: Digivolution (進化, Shinka) is the process by which a Digimon evolves into a higher-leveled, more powerful form.) into Angelamon to defeat Mrs. Brinks and Nanette, before the audience all realize they are in the wrong theater and leave.

=== Eight Years Ago ===
Tai and Kari Kamiya find a Digi-egg that appears from their computer, which hatches and Digivolves into Agumon. Agumon wanders into the night with Kari as Tai pursues them. The neighborhood watches as a Parrotmon hatches from a second Digi-egg in the sky. When Parrotmon attacks Tai and Kari, Agumon protects them by Digivolving to Greymon. When Greymon is knocked out, Tai reawakens him with Kari's whistle and he defeats Parrotmon, but, following the battle, they both disappear. Those who witnessed this would later become the DigiDestined, children chosen to protect the Digital and real worlds.

=== Four Years Later ===
An infected Digi-egg appears on the Internet and hatches into a Digimon who devours computer code, causing chaos to the world's computer systems. Tai and Izzy are warned by Gennai and a boy from Colorado named Willis, (Note: Willis originally had no connection to the events depicted in Digimon Adventure ("Eight Years Ago") and Our War Game! ("Four Years Later"), as he was only in Digimon Hurricane Landing!! / Transcendent Evolution!! The Golden Digimentals (the basis for the segment "Present Day"). Digimon: The Movie rewrote Willis' backstory to include his involvement with Diaboromon in order to connect the films together.) who tells them to find a way to slow the Digimon down. Their Digimon, Agumon and Tentomon, enter the Internet but are no match for the newly Digivolved Infermon. Tai tries to recruit backup, but can only reach Matt and T.K., whose Digimon are also defeated by Infermon's final form, Diaboromon.

Diaboromon duplicates himself and infects the Pentagon's computers, launching nuclear missiles at Colorado and the DigiDestined's neighborhood which will impact in ten minutes. After WarGreymon and MetalGarurumon are defeated by the multitude of Diaboromon, Tai and Matt become digital and enter their computers. Through the collective power of everyone watching, WarGreymon and MetalGarurumon are revived and DNA Digivolve into Omnimon. Omnimon destroys the Diaboromon copies and Izzy, realizing that emails being sent in from people around the world watching on their computers have been slowing their Digimon down, redirects them to the original Diaboromon to freeze him in place long enough for Omnimon to destroy him. The missiles are disabled, but the same virus that created Diaboromon tracks down Willis and corrupts his Digimon, Kokomon.

=== Present Day ===
While visiting Mimi Tachikawa in New York City, T.K. and Kari witness a battle between Willis, Terriermon, and a corrupted Kokomon (Note: Kokomon is the name of the In-Training form that was first infected. Kokomon's Champion, Ultimate and Mega forms appear in the film but the Digimon is consistently referred to as Kokomon by the characters.) who tells Willis to "go back". Willis returns home to Colorado, followed by T.K. and Kari, who informs Davis, Yolei and Cody to meet them there.

Davis, Yolei and Cody hitchhike to Colorado, where they meet Willis and Terriermon on the way. Willis reveals his history with Diaboromon and that the same virus has infected Kokomon. Willis insists that he must confront Kokomon himself, but Terriermon and Davis offer him support and solidarity. In the final battle with Kokomon's Mega form, the DigiDestined are overpowered until Kari, T.K., Angemon and Angewomon intervene. Angewomon and Angemon release Golden Digi-Eggs to Davis and Willis, allowing Veemon and Terriermon to Golden Armor Digivolve to Magnamon and Rapidmon. Kokomon de-ages all the DigiDestined, and they realize that "go back" meant to go back in time to when the virus first attacked. The two Golden Digimon are swallowed by Kokomon and destroy the virus from within, killing Kokomon in the process. After bidding the DigiDestined farewell, Willis and Terriermon find Kokomon's Digi-egg on a beach.

== Voice cast ==
Character	Voice
Kari Kamiya	Lara Jill Miller
Tai Kamiya	Joshua Seth
Koromon	Peggy O'Neal (Botamon); Brianne Siddall; Michael Sorich (Big Agumon); Bob Papenbrook (Red Greymon)
Parrotmon	David Lodge
Mrs. Kamiya	Dorothy Elias-Fahn
Sora Takenouchi	Colleen O'Shaughnessey
Mimi Tachikawa	Philece Sampler
Izzy Izumi	Mona Marshall
Joe Kido	Michael Lindsay
Matt Ishida	Michael Reisz
T.K. Takaishi	Wendee Lee (Young T.K.); Doug Erholtz (Older T.K.)
Diaboromon	Brianne Siddall (Kuramon); Paul St. Peter
Gennai	Mike Reynolds
Agumon	Tom Fahn; Michael Lindsay (Greymon); Joseph Pilato (MetalGreymon); Lex Lang (WarGreymon)
Tentomon	Jeff Nimoy
Biyomon	Tifanie Christun
Gabumon	Kirk Thornton
Palmon	Anna Garduno
Patamon	Laura Summer; Dave Mallow (Angemon, Seraphimon)
Gomamon	R. Martin Klein
Gatomon	Edie Mirman
Willis	Bob Glouberman
Terriermon	Mona Marshall; Michael Sorich (Gargomon); Lex Lang (Rapidmon)
Kokomon	Paul St. Peter; Wendee Lee (little Kokomon)
Davis Motomiya	Brian Donovan
Yolei Inoue	Tifanie Christun
Cody Hida	Philece Sampler
Veemon	Derek Stephen Prince; Steven Jay Blum (Flamedramon, Raidramon, Magnamon)
Hawkmon	Neil Kaplan; Steven Jay Blum (Poromon)
Armadillomon	Robert Axelrod; Dave Mallow (Upamon); Tom Fahn (Digmon)

== Production ==
=== Background ===
Toei Animation had animation fairs every spring and summer with featurettes showcasing its current animated titles. The first Digimon short film was Digimon Adventure, directed by Mamoru Hosoda in his directorial debut and released on March 6, 1999, for the Toei Animation Spring 1999 Animation Fair. Its production preceded final decisions on the 1999 television series of the same name and was subject to several conditions imposed by the Digimon media franchise executives. The event alongside Yu-Gi-Oh! short and Dr. Slump: Arale's Surprise Burn grossed ¥650 million.

The second short, Digimon Adventure: Our War Game! was originally released on March 4, 2000, for the Toei Animation Spring 2000 Animation Fair and later served as the inspiration for director Mamoru Hosoda's 2009 film Summer Wars and 2021 film Belle. The event alongside One Piece: The Movie grossed ¥2.166 billion. The film's ending theme song is "'Haru' Ichōchō" (「春」イ長調) by AiM.

Digimon Adventure 02: Part I: Digimon Hurricane Landing!! / Part II: Transcendent Evolution!! The Golden Digimentals (デジモンアドベンチャー02: 前編 デジモンハリケーン上陸！！ / 後編 超絶進化！！ 黄金のデジメンタル, Dejimon Adobenchā Zero Tsū: Zenpen: Dejimon Harikēn Jōriku!! / Kōhen: Chōzetsu Shinka!! Ōgon no Digimentaru) was released on July 8, 2000, for the Toei Animation Summer 2000 Animation Fair. It was directed by Shigeyasu Yamauchi. The film was screened in two parts, with Ojamajo Doremi #: The Movie screening in between. Only four months separated the release of Our War Game! and this production based on the current season airing in Japan; Toei Animation rejected a script initially green-lighted, considered "too sappy, too depressing" and not enough "action-oriented, pop" by the Japanese studio, a dozen scripts were elaborated and presented in a hurry. The event grossed ¥120 billion, the movie did not meet the expected reception of fans and critics. The film's ending theme song is "Stand By Me (Hitonatsu no Bōken)" (スタンド・バイ・ミー～ひと夏の冒険～, Sutando Bai Mī ~Hitonatsu no Bōken~) by AiM.

=== Pre-production ===
Several animation critics speculated that Fox had wanted to replicate the success of the first two Pokémon films by releasing a feature film for Digimon as well. The only films produced for Digimon at that time were Digimon Adventure (1999), Digimon Adventure: Our War Game! (2000), and Digimon Adventure 02: Part I: Digimon Hurricane Landing!! / Part II: Transcendent Evolution!! The Golden Digimentals (2000), which were all seasonal featurette films. The films were originally planned to be released as separate theatrical films, until Fox settled on releasing them as a singular film.

Around Q2 1999, when production for the English dub of Digimon Adventure had concluded, writers Jeff Nimoy and Bob Buchholz were offered to write Digimon: The Movie while negotiating their contracts to return to write for the show's second season. Nimoy stated that he was concerned about combining the plot of Digimon Hurricane Landing!! / Transcendent Evolution!! The Golden Digimentals, particularly because of its slow pacing and introduction of four new characters that were not in the first two films. He had proposed to Haim Saban to use the Digimon Adventure and Our War Game! and release the third film separately as a direct-to-video film or as a DVD extra. Nimoy also stated that producer Terri-Lei O'Malley suggested using Our War Game! and Digimon Hurricane Landing!! / Transcendent Evolution!! The Golden Digimentals, and releasing the first film as a DVD extra or television special, reasoning that the animation style of the first film did not match the last two. However, all suggestions were overruled and they were forced to include all three films out of contractual obligations with Toei Animation. Nimoy had been disappointed with this decision, and it was one of the factors that led him and Buchholz into leaving the writing team near the end of Digimon Adventure 02's run in North America.

=== Writing ===
A scene from Digimon Hurricane Landing!! cut from Digimon: The Movie, where Mimi (pictured right) appears and is captured by Wendigomon with the rest of the older DigiDestined.

Nimoy and Buchholz first rearranged footage from Digimon Adventure, Our War Game!, and Digimon Hurricane Landing!! / Transcendent Evolution!! The Golden Digimentals to outline the overall plot of Digimon: The Movie. As Nimoy and Buchholz noticed that Digi-eggs were a recurring image in all three films, they used that to connect their narratives. After editing the footage and sending it to post-development, they began writing the script for the film. Originally, Nimoy wanted to have Tai narrate, but since Tai did not play a major role in the third part, the role was instead relegated to Kari.

In addition, Nimoy and Buchholz rewrote Digimon Hurricane Touchdown!! / Transcendent Evolution!! The Golden Digimentals to include Willis being involved in Diaboromon's creation. As the three films were respectively 20, 40, and 60 minutes long, footage was condensed to fit 85 minutes. Digimon Adventure was used as basis for the "Eight Years Ago" sequence, Our War Game! in the "Four Years Later" sequence, and Digimon Hurricane Landing!! / Transcendent Evolution!! The Golden Digimentals in the "Present Day" sequence. Digimon Hurricane Landing!! / Transcendent Evolution!! The Golden Digimentals was heavily cut, including a subplot featuring the older DigiDestined being captured and de-aged by Wendigomon.

Alongside of that, the writing is in the style of the animated series, with Japanese cultural differences removed and North American jokes inserted. One particular example of a cultural difference being removed was that, in Digimon Hurricane Landing!! / Transcendent Evolution!! The Golden Digimentals, the main characters hitchhiked across the United States. In writing the jokes, Nimoy and Buchholz worked backwards by coming up with a punchline and writing the set-up later. An early version of the official website listed Willis' name as his name in the Japanese version, Wallace, until it was changed to "Willis" in the final version. Prior to the release of Digimon: The Movie, the film led to a dispute between Saban Entertainment and the Screen Actors Guild. The Screen Actors Guild negotiated for actors contracted under them to be paid residuals over home video and subsequent television broadcasts, as they felt Digimon: The Movie was considered an original work due to the dialogue deviating from the original script.

The Angela Anaconda short at the beginning of the film was later re-released as an episode in the television series titled "Good Seats" on January 15, 2001, with all dialogue mentioning Digimon removed.

== Release and marketing ==
Taco Bell promoted Digimon: The Movie the summer before the film's release via a summer partnership with the franchise from July 13, 2000, to September 9, 2000. Participating restaurants offered toys and other collectibles with purchase of their kids' meals. To promote the film's theatrical release in 2000, moviegoers received a promotional Digi-Battle trading card. Each pack contained one card and an advertising insert, with 12 different cards available to collect.

On October 6, 2000, the Mall of America hosted the premiere of Digimon: The Movie.

=== Home media ===
Digimon: The Movie was released on DVD and VHS in the United States on February 6, 2001 by 20th Century Fox Home Entertainment.

In the United Kingdom, 20th Century Fox Home Entertainment released the film on DVD on June 4, 2001. It peaked at number five on the Official Video Chart in June 2001 and had spent 13 weeks on the chart by September.

In Germany, the film was released on DVD as Digimon – Der Film on September 24, 2001 by 20th Century Fox Home Entertainment. In France, Fox Pathé Europa released Digimon, le film on DVD on October 4, 2001. The edition included a collectible Digimon card and the music video for Len's "Kids in America". The film was also released on DVD and VHS in Italy in 2001 by 20th Century Fox Home Entertainment.

In July 2023, Discotek Media announced the acquisition of the rights of Digimon: The Movie for a Blu-ray release. In addition to Digimon: The Movie, the release also included newly produced English dubs for the original three short films used to create Digimon: The Movie. Most of the original actors reprised their roles. It was released on December 17, 2024, under the title Digimon: The Movies.

== Reception ==
=== Box office ===
Digimon: The Movie opened at #5 in the box office (being shown in 1,825 theaters) and earned $4,233,304 on the opening weekend. The film's run ended on December 3, 2000, at #56 drawing in a weekend gross of $19,665 grossing a total of $9,631,153 domestically. The movie also drew in $1,567,641 in the UK after its release on February 16, 2001 and $2,200,656 in Germany the same year. It earned a total of US$16,643,191 (equivalent to $31,100,000 in 2025), making it a minor box office success compared to its budget of $5 million.

The international success of Digimon: The Movie led Toshio Suzuki to contact Mamoru Hosoda to direct Howl's Moving Castle, though he later left the production due to creative differences. Digimon: The Movie is Hosoda's most successful film in the United States.

=== Critical reception ===
The film received generally negative reviews from critics. According to the review aggregator website Rotten Tomatoes, 24% of critics have given the movie a positive review based on 41 reviews, with an average rating of 4/10. The site's critics consensus reads, "Digimon is better than Pokemon, but it's still a predictable movie with mediocre animation." On Metacritic, the film has a weighted average score of 20 out of 100 based on 17 critics, indicating "generally unfavorable" reviews. Reviews from The New York Times, The Globe and Mail, and Common Sense Media stated that there was too little focus on the plot and characters, which alienated audiences who were not familiar with the television series.

At the 2000 Stinkers Bad Movie Awards, the film won the award for "Worst Achievement in Animation". However; the magazine Animage conducted a list of the "Top 100" anime productions in January 2001, and Digimon: The Movie placed 88th on list.

=== Legacy ===
Despite the film's production struggles and negative critical reception, audience and fan response to the film has been more positive. It continues to generate articles, reviews, memes, urban legends, and fads on social networks counting a few thousand engagements.

Writing for IGN Southeast Asia, Dale Bashir highlights some aspects of the film's production value stating, "Now is Digimon: The Movie better than the three movies it was adapting from? No, not even in the slightest. That doesn't mean this movie cannot stand on its own merits, especially as a great case study into the art of dubbing and adapting foreign media into English." Nick Valdez for ComicBook also compliments aspects of the dub stating, "Because anime dubbing and licensing is handled far differently these days, Digimon: The Movie is not something that can be made again."

The ska punk-influenced soundtrack has been singled out particularly, with many outlets and reviewers claiming it as the best aspect of the whole film. IGN deemed the soundtrack, "memorable", with CBR also claiming, "it's almost a perfect time capsule of the 2000s."

In January 2022, for the release of Belle, Mamoru Hosoda expressed that whenever he promotes a new project abroad, he now meets many people who grew up with Digimon and who talk about the movie.

== Soundtrack ==
Music from the Motion Picture Digimon: The Movie

Soundtrack album by various artists
- Released: September 19, 2000
- Genres: Alternative rock; pop punk; hip hop; ska punk
- Length: 50:16
- Label: Maverick
- Producers: Paul Gordon; Eric Valentine; Fatboy Slim; Mumble C; DJ Moves; Susan Rogers; Paul Q. Kolderie; Howard Benson; Josh Debear

Music from the Motion Picture Digimon: The Movie is the original motion picture soundtrack for the film, Digimon: The Movie, released September 19, 2000, on Maverick Records on CD and compact cassette. The film score was composed by Udi Harpaz and Amotz Plessner, and was performed by the Israel Philharmonic Orchestra.

The film's theme song is the "Digi Rap", a remix of the theme song from the English version of Digimon Adventure. The track is performed by Josh Debear under the name "M.C. Pea Pod" and Paul Gordon.

No.	Title	Writer(s)	Performer(s)	Length
1.	"Digi Rap"	Shuki Levy, Paul Gordon, Kussa Mahchi	MC Pea Pod (Josh Debear), Paul Gordon	3:11
2.	"All Star"	Gregory D. Camp	Smash Mouth	3:20
3.	"The Rockafeller Skank" (Short Edit)	John Barry, Norman Cook, Terry Winford	Fatboy Slim	4:02
4.	"Kids in America"	Marty Wilde, Ricky Wilde	LEN	3:54
5.	"Hey Digimon"	Shuki Levy, Paul Gordon, Kussa Mahchi	Paul Gordon	2:31
6.	"One Week"	Ed Robertson	Barenaked Ladies	2:52
7.	"The Impression That I Get"	Dicky Barrett, Joe Gittleman	The Mighty Mighty Bosstones	3:17
8.	"All My Best Friends Are Metalheads"	Chris Demakes, Vinny Fiorello, Roger Manganelli	Less Than Jake	3:13
9.	"Run Around"	Jeremy Sweet, Shuki Levy, Kussa Mahchi	Jasan Radford	2:09
10.	"Nowhere Near"	Tim Cullen	Summercamp	2:21
11.	"Spill"	Daniel Castady, David Hyde, Graham Jordan, Christopher Messer	Showoff	2:16
12.	"Here We Go"	Jeremy Sweet, Shuki Levy, Kussa Mahchi	Jason Gochin	2:25
13.	"Digimon Theme" (hidden track)	Paul Gordon, Shuki Levy, Kussa Mahchi	Paul Gordon	3:00
14.	"Change Into Power" (hidden track)	Paul Gordon, Shuki Levy, Kussa Mahchi	Paul Gordon	2:35
15.	"Let's Kick It Up" (hidden track)	Paul Gordon, Shuki Levy, Kussa Mahchi	Paul Gordon	3:12
16.	"Going Digital" (hidden track)	Jeremy Sweet, Shuki Levy, Kussa Mahchi	Jasan Radford	3:00
17.	"Strange" (hidden track)	Jeremy Sweet, Shuki Levy, Kussa Mahchi	Jasan Radford	2:48

== See also ==
- List of Digimon films
