= Digi-Battle =

Collectible card game

- Publishers: Upper Deck/Bandai
- Players: 2 or more
- Setup time: < 5 minutes
- Playing time: < 60 minutes

Digi-Battle, also known as Digimon and Digital Monster Card Game / Hyper Colosseum in some markets, is an out-of-print collectible card game (CCG) by Upper Deck and Bandai.

It was initially released in February 2000 as fixed 62-card starter decks though by the end of 2000 they changed the card design. However, because Upper deck already printed a French version of the booster 3 series in the traditional style, they still went ahead and released it. Bandai went on to release four 30-card "Street Decks in the new design" with 30-card decks being a way to play the game.

Six expansions were released called Series 1 through 6 (series 1, series 2, series 3, etc. to series 6). Upper Deck's contract with Bandai expired after the release of Series 2 and Bandai started producing it themselves. The game ended in 2001 with a transition to Bandai's next CCG iteration called Digimon D-Tector that was mostly released in stores like Walgreens.

Digi-Battle released a series of promos through Taco Bell as well as other venues like movie theaters, video game and television promotions. Taco Bell collaborations happened during Digimon: The Movie promotions, the summer before the film's release via a summer partnership with the franchise from July 13, 2000, to September 9, 2000. Participating restaurants offered toys and other collectibles with purchase of their kids' meals. 12 cards to use in Digi-Battle could be obtained during this promotion. Mall promotions, such as the Mall of America took place and the venue hosted a promotion for the same movie.
