= Digimon Frontier: Island of Lost Digimon =

2002 short film by Takahiro Imamura

- Theatrical release poster
- Japanese: デジモンフロンティア 古代デジモン復活！！
- Literal meaning: Digimon Frontier: Ancient Digimon Revival!!
- Revised Hepburn: Dejimon Furontia Kodai Dejimon Fukkatsu!!
- Directed by: Takahiro Imamura
- Screenplay by: Sukehiro Tomita
- Based on: Digimon by Akiyoshi Hongo
- Starring: see below
- Edited by: Shigeru Nishiyama
- Music by: Takanori Arisawa
- Production company: Toei Animation
- Distributed by: Toei Company, Ltd.
- Release date: July 20, 2002
- Running time: 40 minutes
- Country: Japan
- Language: Japanese
- Box office: US$5.9 million

Digimon Frontier: Island of Lost Digimon (Note: Japanese: デジモンフロンティア 古代デジモン復活！！, Hepburn: Dejimon Furontia Kodai Dejimon Fukkatsu!!; lit. "Digimon Frontier: Ancient Digimon Revival!!") is a 2002 Japanese animated adventure short film directed by Takahiro Imamura and written by Sukehiro Tomita; the short film is based on the Digimon franchise by Akiyoshi Hongo, and its fourth series, Digimon Frontier. Produced by Toei Animation and distributed by Toei Company, Island of Lost Digimon is the seventh film in the franchise. In the short film, Takuya and his friends end up on an island, where a war between humanoid and bestial Digimons erupt. Island of Lost Digimon was released in Japan on July 20, 2002, as part of Toei Animation Summer 2002 Animation Fair, featuring alongside Kinnikuman: Muscle Ginseng Competition! The Great Chōjin War and Fierce Fight! Crush Gear Turbo: Kaiserburn's Challenge! films.

== Plot ==
Takuya and his companions, the Digi-Destined, are traveling through a desert when they find themselves ending up on a floating island known as the Lost Island, which is in a civil war between human and beast Digimon. While ending up on a village of humanoid Digimon, Takuya, J.P. and Tommy learn from Kotemon of a legend that the island was protected by their god Ornismon. Kotemon proceeds to take them to a neutral location where his friend Bearmon brought Koji and Zoe after they ended up in his village. After the two sides argue what they learned, Bearmon and Kotemon lead them to a mural of Ornismon, with Bokomon deeming the DigiCode to be incomplete. Their peaceful meeting is broken up as Kotemon and Bearmon's respective elder brothers, Dinohyumon and Grizzlymon, appear and battle each other. But after Takuya and Koji transform into Agunimon and KendoGarurumon to stop them, Dinohyumon and Grizzlymon take their respective brothers with them.

As the human Digimon prepare for battle after their leader Darcmon rallies the crowd, Takuya accepts Dinohyumon's recruitment offer to allow Tommy to escape with Kotemon. A similar event with J.P. and Zoe spiriting Bearmon occurs at the beast Digimon village as Koji accepts Grizzlymon's offer to fight during a speech by the beast Digimon's leader, Hippogriffomon. Zoe, Tommy, J.P., Bokomon, and Neemon help Bearmon, Kotemon, and many newborn Digimon assemble the writing under the mural, but upon its completion, Bokomon learns that Ornismon is actually an evil Digimon that oppressed the island before being defeated by the Ancient Warriors, AncientGreymon and AncientGarurumon. Furthermore, after the group notices a missing piece in the mural that is in the same shape as the ornament both Darcmon and Hippogriffomon possess, J.P. and Zoe proceed to find Takuya and Koji while Tommy, Bokomon, and Neemon stay to finish the mural of AncientGreymon and AncientGarurumon in hopes that they can find an answer to the crisis.

At the battlefield, Takuya and Koji eventually transform into BurningGreymon and Lobomon to stop the fight, but they end up getting both sides turning on them before Kazemon and Beetlemon arrive and reveal that, while on their way to their friends, they discovered a dark secret: the leaders of the two factions are the same Digimon after witnessing Darcmon transform into Hippogriffomon. Exposed while forced to become Darcmon again, the fraud reveals to have been collecting the Fractal Code to revive and control Ornismon while assuming his true form: Murmukusmon. Overpowering the Legendary Warriors, Murmukusmon guides Ornismon to the murals of AncientGreymon and AncientGarurumon, which begin shining. Kotemon sacrifices himself to protect them, and Bearmon's tears along with Kotemon's sacrifice summons spectral forms of the Ancient Warriors. Their appearance gives the DigiDestined a second wind with the island residents joining them as Agunimon takes out Murmukusmon before the Legendary Warriors destroy Ornismon. With Ornismon gone, the Lost Island returns to the Digital World with the two sides finally making peace and Kotemon turning up alive as he and Bearmon have a tearful reunion.

== Voice cast ==
Character	Japanese voice cast	English voice cast
Takuya Kanbara	Junko Takeuchi	Dave Wittenberg
Koji Minamoto	Hiroshi Kamiya	Steve Staley
Izumi Orimoto (Zoe Orimoto)	Sawa Ishige	Michelle Ruff
Tomoki Himi (Tommy Himi)	Kumiko Watanabe	Brianne Siddall
Junpei Shibayama (J.P. Shibayama)	Masato Amada	Steven Blum
Bokomon	Kazuko Sugiyama	Brian Beacock
Neemon	Masami Kikuchi	Michael Sorich
Bearmon	Akemi Okamura	Wendee Lee
Grizzlymon	Kenta Miyake	Peter Spellos
Kotemon	Taeko Kawata	Debi Mae West
Dinohyumon	Yuji Ueda	Doug Erholtz
Darcmon	Takako Uehara	Tara Platt
Hippogryphomon	Hikaru Midorikawa	Wally Wingert
Murmukusmon	Ken Yamaguchi	Bob Papenbrook

== Production ==
The film was directed by Takahiro Imamura at Toei Animation, while Sukehiro Tomita and Tadayoshi Yamamuro from the television series provided the screenplay and animation direction respectively.

== Release ==
=== Japanese release ===
The short film was released in Japan on July 20, 2002, as part of Toei Animation Summer 2002 Animation Fair, featuring alongside Kinnikuman: Muscle Ginseng Competition! The Great Chōjin War and Fierce Fight! Crush Gear Turbo: Kaiserburn's Challenge! films.

=== English release ===
The film premiered on Jetix in the United States on November 27, 2005. Post production company Studiopolis produced the English dub as they did with the previous Digimon films, reuniting majority of the voice cast and director involved.

== Reception ==
=== Box office ===
The short film was deemed as a box office failure, earning total of 800 million yen (US$6.8m), where the film alone grossed about 460 million yen (US$5.9m)
