= Showoff (band) =

US musical group

- Showoff, 1999

Background information
- Origin: Chicago, Illinois
- Genres: Pop punk; punk rock; ska punk; alternative rock
- Years active: 1996–2002; 2005; 2006; 2014–2021; 2023–present
- Labels: Maverick; Pacific Ridge; Dodgeball; •Manic Kat Records(Current)
- Members: Chris Envy; Mickey Molinari; Stephen Avery (Envy); Evan Thorne; Brian Steinseifer
- Past members: Graham Jordan; Dave Hyde (Envy); Daniel Castady; Kyle Lewis; Nick Piljay; Magoo; Carl Kusch; Lance Tamras; Nate Thruman (Envy); Tony Tintari; Oliver Deighton; Joe Oldaker; Mike Muse; Austin Keep; Matthew Nielsen; Alex Crook

Showoff is a pop punk band from Chicago, Illinois, led by vocalist and founding member Chris Envy, also known as Chris Messer.

== History ==
Showoff was formed in 1997 in Villa Park, Illinois. The band consisted of Chris Envy, Daniel Castady (drums), Graham Jordan (guitar), and Dave Envy (a.k.a. Dave Hyde) (bass). In 1998, Showoff signed with Maverick Records while it was owned by Madonna. Their self-titled debut album was released the following year in 1999, and was produced by Goldfinger's John Feldmann. The single "Falling Star" reached No. 36 on the Billboard Modern Rock chart that same year. Their song "Spill" was included on the soundtrack for the film Digimon: The Movie, which was released in 2000. They held a one-off reunion show in March 2005 for a cancer benefit. In 2006, Chris Envy reformed the band with Mickey Molinari and released the EP, Waiting for You. In 2017, Showoff released a new album Midwest Side Story and played a few shows. In 2023, Chris Envy reformed the band with previous drummer Mickey Molinari and guitarist Steve Envy (a.k.a Stephen Avery). After a number of shifts in personnel the following year, the band added guitarist Brian Steinseifer, and bassist Evan Thorne. On April 12, 2024 it was officially announced that Showoff had signed to a new label home in Manic Kat Records. There are plans for extensive touring, several singles, and an EP release in the future.

== Discography ==
Year	Title	Label	Format	Other information
1997	...Around The Corner Fudge Is Made	Self Released	LP	First release
1999	Red Tape	Self Released	EP	Second release
1999	"Falling Star"	Maverick Records	Single	Single
1999	Showoff	Maverick Records	LP	Third release - major label debut album
2015	Wish You Were Her...	Dodgeball Records	LP	
2006	Waiting For You	Pacific Ridge Records	EP	Fourth release
2008	Waiting For You	Pacific Ridge Records	EP	Re-issue with two bonus tracks
2017	Midwest Side Story	Dodgeball Records	LP	Fifth Release
2023	"Bitter Pill"	Manic Kat Records	Single	Single
2024	Haverstraw	Manic Kat Records	EP	Sixth Release
