= Digimon Adventure (film) =

1999 animated film

- Film poster

Japanese name
- Kanji: デジモンアドベンチャー
Transcriptions
- Revised Hepburn: Dejimon Adobenchā
- Directed by: Mamoru Hosoda
- Written by: Reiko Yoshida
- Based on: Digital Monster by Bandai & WiZ; Character from Digimon Adventure V-Tamer 01 by Hiroshi Izawa
- Produced by: Hiromi Seki
- Cinematography: Shigeru Andô
- Edited by: Yasuhiro Yoshikawa
- Music by: Takanori Arisawa
- Production company: Toei Animation
- Distributed by: Toei
- Release date: March 6, 1999
- Running time: 20 minutes
- Country: Japan
- Language: Japanese
- Box office: ¥650 million

Digimon Adventure (Japanese: デジモンアドベンチャー, Hepburn: Dejimon Adobenchā) is a 1999 Japanese animated short film directed by Mamoru Hosoda. A part of the Digimon media franchise, Digimon Adventure is the first Digimon film, and serves as a prologue and prequel to the 1999–2000 anime television series of the same name. The film was released in theaters in Japan on March 6, 1999, the day before the release of the Digimon Adventure television series.

== Plot ==
In Tokyo, a creature hatches from an egg that emerges from a computer screen in the home of Taichi Yagami / Taichi "Tai" Kamiya and his younger sister Hikari Yagami / Kari Kamiya. Upon being cared for by the children, it transforms into a dinosaur-like creature that begins wandering the streets of the city. A second egg appears in the sky over Tokyo, from which a bird-like creature emerges. Taichi, Hikari, and several other children witness the two creatures fight; with Taichi and Hikari's encouragement, the dinosaur emerges victorious and both creatures vanish.

== Cast ==
Character name		Voice actor		
Japanese	English	Japanese	English	
Japanese	English	Japanese	Fox Family Worldwide/Saban (2000)	Sound Cadence/Discotek (2024)
Taichi Yagami	Taichi "Tai" Kamiya	Toshiko Fujita	Joshua Seth	Joshua Seth
Hikari Yagami	Kari Kamiya	Kae Araki	Lara Jill Miller	Lara Jill Miller
—N/a	Botamon	—N/a	Peggy O'Neal	Peggy O'Neal
Koromon		Chika Sakamoto	Brianne Siddall	Brianne Siddall
—N/a	Big Agumon	—N/a	Michael Sorich	Michael Sorich
—N/a	Red Greymon	—N/a	Bob Papenbrook	Bryce Papenbrook
Taichi's Mother	Yuuko Kamiya	Yoshiko Sakakibara	Dorothy Elias-Fahn	Dorothy Elias-Fahn
Taichi's Father	Susumu Kamiya	Hiroya Ishimaru	—N/a	Doug Erholtz
Miko the Cat		Yumi Tōma	Michael Sorich	Michael Sorich
—N/a	Izzy Izumi	—N/a	Mona Marshall	Mona Marshall
—N/a	Matt Ishida	—N/a	Michael Reisz	Michael Reisz
—N/a	T.K. Takaishi	—N/a	Wendee Lee	Wendee Lee
—N/a	Sora Takenouchi	—N/a	Colleen O'Shaughnessey	Colleen O'Shaughnessey
—N/a	Mimi Tachikawa	—N/a	Philece Sampler	Elsie Lovelock
—N/a	Joe Kido	—N/a	Michael Lindsay	Eli Farmer
—N/a	Little Boy 1A	—N/a	—N/a	Marissa Lenti
—N/a	Little Boy 1B	—N/a	—N/a	Anna Garduno
—N/a	Little Girl 1A	—N/a	—N/a	Cherami Leigh
—N/a	Parrotmon	—N/a	David Lodge	David Lodge
—N/a	Truck Driver 1	—N/a	Jeff Nimoy	Jeff Nimoy
—N/a	Truck Driver 2	—N/a	Bob Buchholz	Bob Buchholz

Ai Nagano, Shizuka Okohira, Shoko Kikuchi, and Yū Sugimoto provide the voices of the other kids. Kayleigh McKee, Valory Pierce, Michelle Marie, and Peggy O'Neal provide additional voices in Discotek's dub.

== Production ==
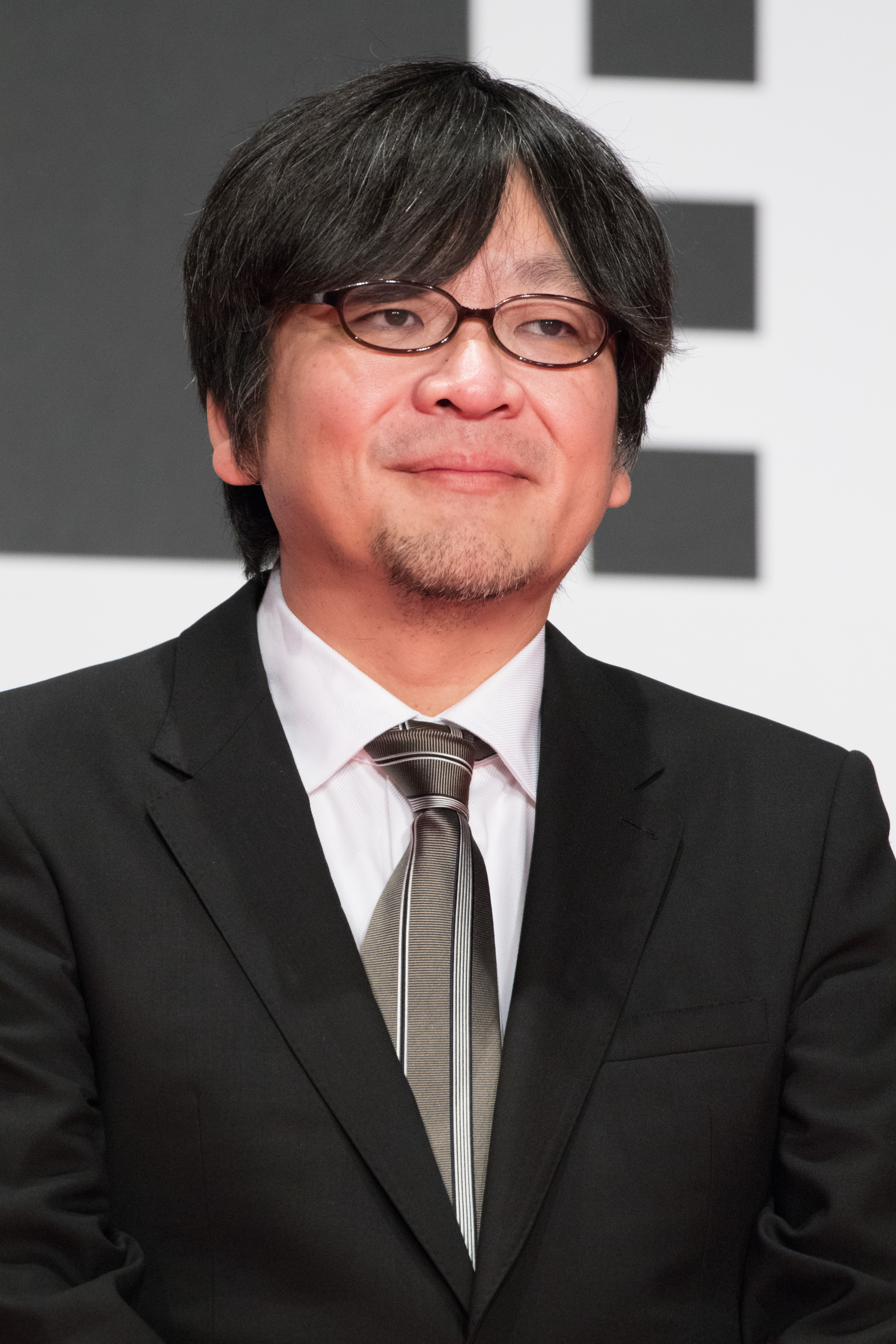
Digimon Adventure director Mamoru Hosoda

Digimon Adventure was directed by Mamoru Hosoda, written by Reiko Yoshida, and produced by Toei Animation. It is the first of two Digimon movies directed by Hosoda, preceding Digimon Adventure: Our War Game! (2000). The film was originally conceived as a standalone project based on the Digital Monster virtual pet created by WiZ and Bandai, with character designs by Katsuyoshi Nakatsuru that were inspired by 1970s comic book artwork. Following the launch of the manga series Digimon Adventure V-Tamer 01 in the manga magazine V Jump in 1998, Toei elected to make the manga's protagonist Taichi Yagami the primary character of Digimon Adventure. The film was ultimately re-developed into a prologue for the 1999 anime television series of the same name, which began production one-month-and-a-half after the film did so.

Because Hosoda could not place the events of the film in the same time period as the Digimon Adventure television series without creating plot inconsistencies, his original concept for the film was a story in which Taichi/Tai's father and his Digimon partner travel around Tokyo against the backdrop of the 1964 Summer Olympics; the proposal was rejected, and Hosoda was instead instructed to create a kaiju film. Faced with the difficulty of creating a kaiju film in the film's 20 minute length, Hosoda and Yoshida elected to focus principally on the film's climactic fight scene. Concerns around plot inconsistencies between film and television series were resolved by placing the events of the film several years before the events of the series.

== Release ==
Digimon Adventure was released in theaters in Japan on March 6, 1999, one day before the release of the Digimon Adventure television series. Alongside Yu-Gi-Oh! and Doctor Slump: Arale's Surprise Burn, it was released as part of the Spring 1999 Toei Animation Fair. A DVD collecting Digimon Adventure and Digimon Adventure: Our War Game! was released on October 13, 2000, for rental, and on January 21, 2001, for purchase. The film's theme song is "Butter-Fly" by Koji Wada.

In North America, footage from Digimon Adventure was edited with footage from the films Digimon Adventure: Our War Game! (2000) and Digimon Adventure 02: Digimon Hurricane Touchdown!!/Transcendent Evolution! The Golden Digimentals (2000) to create Digimon: The Movie, which was released in theaters on October 6, 2000.

In July 2023, Discotek Media announced plans to release both Digimon: The Movie and the individual films. The films were given new dubs featuring surviving members of the original cast, including Joshua Seth, Michael Reisz, and Lara Jill Miller, as well as new cast members, such as Bob Papenbrook's son, Bryce Papenbrook, as Red Greymon. It was released on December 17, 2024.

== Reception ==
Digimon Adventure, Yu-Gi-Oh! and Doctor Slump: Arale's Surprise Burn collectively grossed ¥650 million (2001) (equivalent to ¥729.74 million or US$4.82 million in 2024).

Producers of Gamera 3: Revenge of Iris which was released on the same day as Digimon Adventure, largely praised the Digimon film, and later noted in an interview that the film is inspiring and made them to realize that they should seek to create entertainments like Digimon Adventure.

Crunchyroll praised Digimon Adventure as an "endearing short film", praising Hosoda's "admirable" direction and storytelling despite the largely commercial purpose of the film. Writing for Polygon, Allegra Frank concurs that while the film is attached to a "Pokémon-like multimedia machine", it has "heart, and humor"; Chris Cimi of Otaquest similarly notes that while the film is "made to sell toys and games, Hosoda proved his aptitudes for resonance and charismatic visual story-telling clear as day."
