= Jeff Nimoy =

American voice actor and writer

- Nimoy (right) with Quinton Flynn in 2007
- Born: Jeffrey Nimoy
- Occupations: Voice actor, director, producer, writer
- Relatives: Leonard Nimoy (second cousin once removed); Julie Nimoy (second cousin twice removed); Adam Nimoy (second cousin twice removed); Jonah Nimoy (second cousin thrice removed)

Jeffrey Nimoy is an American voice actor and writer best known as the voice of Nicholas D. Wolfwood from Trigun, and Tentomon (and his higher Digivolution forms) from the Digimon series. Nimoy has reprised his roles of Tentomon and Gennai in the Digimon tri. film series.

== Career ==
Nimoy wrote, directed, and served as story editor for the English adaptation of the Digimon: Digital Monsters anime (1999–2001 series and the franchise films Digimon: The Movie and Digimon 02: Revenge of Diaboromon). He also served as an executive producer and writer on numerous other Fox Kids series. Prior to that, he was nominated for three Emmy Awards in four years, winning once, for his comedic work as a writer and producer for NFL Films Presents on ESPN and Fox. He also co-wrote the Showtime movie Big Brother Trouble (2000), and the animated series Pecola. He is the second cousin once removed of Leonard Nimoy. Nimoy also co-directed the English version of Robodz and the Stitch! anime series.

Nimoy has also starred in the online webisode series Adventures in Anime with Quinton Flynn.

Nimoy also directed and starred in Fame-ish, a movie about a fictional version of himself.

== Dubbing roles ==
=== Animated series English dubbing ===
List of dubbing performances in anime
Year	Title	Role	Notes	Source
1999-2000	Digimon Adventure	Tentomon/Kabuterimon/MegaKabuterimon, Young Gennai, Izzy's Father, Cherrymon		
2000-2001	Flint The Time Detective	Lynx (Snake Head) (Ep. 8-9)		
2000-2001	Digimon Adventure 02	Tentomon/Kabuterimon/MegaKabuterimon, Young Gennai, Cherrymon, Roachmon #2		
2000	Trigun	Nicholas D. Wolfwood		
2000	Outlaw Star	Additional Voices		
2005-2008	Zatch Bell!	Kanchome (ep58+), Mr. Goldo, Main Henchman (Ep. 37)		
2005	Naruto	Additional Voices		
2007-2008	Digimon Data Squad	Dr. Spencer Damon, Kamemon/Gwappamon/Shawujinmon, DemiDevimon #1, Additional voices	Voice Director/Script Adapter	

- Cyborg 009 – Additional Voices
- Fushigi Yuugi – Toki Ōsugi

=== Animated film English dubbing ===
List of voice and English dubbing performances in feature films
Year	Title	Role	Notes	Source
2000	Digimon: The Movie	Tentomon/Kabuterimon/MegaKabuterimon, Truck Driver #1, Floyd the Barber, Barney, Cabbie, Kid #3, Phone Voice #1		
2005	Digimon: Revenge of Diaboromon	Tentomon, Hawkmon, Gabumon, Omnimon (shared)		
2016-2018	Digimon Adventure tri.	Tentomon/Kabuterimon/MegaKabuterimon/HerculesKabuterimon, Dark Gennai, Additional voices		
2020	Digimon Adventure: Last Evolution Kizuna	Tentomon/Kabuterimon, Young Gennai	Script Adaption	
2023-2024	Digimon Adventure	Truck Driver #1		
2023-2024	Digimon Adventure: Our War Game!	Tentomon/Kabuterimon/MegaKabuterimon, Floyd the Barber, Elderly Husband 2A		
2023-2024	Digimon Adventure 02: Hurricane Touchdown/The Golden Digimentals	Male Driver 3A		

=== Live action English dubbing ===
List of English dubbing performances in live action films
Year	Title	Role	Notes	Source
1998	Run Lola Run	Manni	English casting	

=== Video games English dubbing ===
- Zatch Bell! Mamodo Fury – Kanchome
