= Digimon Adventure tri. =

Japanese anime film series

- Key visual featuring the protagonists from Digimon Adventure 6 years after the events of the original series.

デジモンアドベンチャー tri. (Dejimon Adobenchā tri.)
- Genre: Adventure, fantasy, science fiction
- Created by: Akiyoshi Hongo
- Anime film series
- Directed by: Keitaro Motonaga
- Produced by: Shuhei Arai; Makiko Murakami; Tohru Nishida; Kōhei Motokawa
- Written by: Yūko Kakihara
- Music by: Go Sakabe
- Studio: Toei Animation
- Licensed by: AUS: Madman Entertainment; NA: Eleven Arts Shout! Factory; UK: Manga Entertainment
- Released: November 21, 2015 (Part 1); March 12, 2016 (Part 2); September 24, 2016 (Part 3); February 25, 2017 (Part 4); September 30, 2017 (Part 5); May 5, 2018 (Part 6)
- Runtime: 86 minutes (Part 1); 84 minutes (Part 2); 101 minutes (Part 3); 78 minutes (Part 4); 85 minutes (Part 5); 97 minutes (Part 6)
- Films: 6
- Digimon franchise
- Digimon Adventure; Digimon Adventure 02; Digimon Tamers; Digimon Frontier; Digimon Data Squad (Savers); Digimon Fusion (Xros Wars); Digimon Universe: App Monsters; Digimon Adventure (2020); Digimon Ghost Game; Digimon Beatbreak

Digimon Adventure tri. (Japanese: デジモンアドベンチャーtri., Hepburn: Dejimon Adobenchā Torai.) is a Japanese adventure anime film series (sometimes referred to as OVAs) produced by Toei Animation. Celebrating the 15th anniversary of the Digimon franchise, the six-part series serves as a direct sequel to the first two television series, Digimon Adventure and Digimon Adventure 02, and follows the high school years of the first eight "Digi-Destined".

The first film, Reunion, was released on November 21, 2015, and the latest, Future, was released on May 5, 2018, in Japan, simultaneously in a three-week limited release in a dozen theaters nationwide, along with a limited Blu-ray release and a premium digital distribution. These films were simulcast worldwide outside of Japan through Crunchyroll in the original version with subtitles on the same day as their domestic Japanese release, in an episodic format with four or five episodes each.

The films were also localized with English and German dubbing for events or direct-to-video exportation. Toei presented the project to industry professionals several years in a row, but failed to sell it to other markets. Adventure tri. received generally mixed reviews from critics.

== Plot ==
The film series is set six years after Digimon Adventure and takes place in 2005. A mysterious anomaly is causing distortions in the Real World and Digimon are being plagued by a virus that turns them hostile. These circumstances lead to the eight original DigiDestined being reunited with their partner Digimon. Joined by a mysterious DigiDestined named Meiko Mochizuki and her partner Meicoomon, they are set to solve the mystery of the infected Digimon and deal with the responsibility of growing up.

== List of films ==
The films were streamed outside Japan in the original language with subtitles on the same day they were released domestically, divided into four or five episodes each. The theme song for the original Japanese version is "Butter-Fly (tri. version)" by Kōji Wada, while the English version has the theme song titled "Digimon Are Back (Again!)", performed by John Majkut. The reason of this change is because of licensing issues. The Japanese version's theme song was later kept in the fourth and sixth parts.

The first film, Reunion (再会, Saikai), was released in Japan on November 21, 2015, Indonesia on August 3, 2016, North America on September 15, 2016, and Germany and Austria on May 21, 2017. It was released on region-free DVD and Blu-ray in Japan on December 18, 2015, the U.S. on May 16, 2017, the UK on May 22, 2017, Australia on July 19, 2017, and Germany on August 7, 2017.

The second film, Determination (決意, Ketsui), was released in Japan on March 12, 2016, as well as Germany and Austria on July 2, 2017. It was released on region-free DVD and Blu-ray in Japan on April 2, 2016, the U.S. at Anime Expo from July 1, 2017, through July 4, 2017, as well as San Diego Comic-Con from July 19, 2017, through July 23, 2017, ahead of a general release on August 15, 2017, Germany on October 9, 2017, the UK at MCM London Comic Con from October 27, 2017, through October 29, 2017, ahead of a general release on November 6, 2017, and Australia on February 21, 2018.

The third film, Confession (告白, Kokuhaku), was released in Japan on September 24, 2016, North America on July 1, 2017, and Germany and Austria on August 13, 2017. It was released on region-free DVD and Blu-ray in Japan on November 2, 2016, Germany on October 30, 2017, the U.S. on December 5, 2017, the UK on December 18, 2017, and Australia on March 7, 2018. It was dedicated to Wada, who passed away on April 3, 2016, and Sora's original Japanese voice actress, Yūko Mizutani, who passed away on May 17, 2016.

The fourth film, Loss (喪失, Sōshitsu), was released in Japan on February 25, 2017 and North America on February 1, 2018. It was released on region-free DVD and Blu-ray in Japan on April 4, 2017, the U.S. on April 24, 2018, the UK on April 30, 2018, and Australia on August 15, 2018.

The fifth film, Coexistence (共生, Kyōsei), was released in Japan on September 30, 2017, and North America on May 10, 2018. It was released on region-free DVD and Blu-ray in Japan on November 2, 2017, the U.S. at Anime Expo on July 5, 2018, through July 8, 2018, ahead of a general release on August 7, 2018, the UK on July 30, 2018, and Australia on November 1, 2018.

The last film, Future (ぼくらの未来, Bokura no Mirai), was released in Japan on May 5, 2018, and North America on September 20, 2018. It was released on region-free DVD and Blu-ray in Japan on June 2, 2018, the UK on December 3, 2018, the U.S. on December 4, 2018, and Australia on March 6, 2019.

The films were streamed in episodic format outside Japan by Crunchyroll, Hulu, AnimeLab, and Tubi TV, while Eleven Arts and Shout! Factory are distributing the English-language films.

Film No.	Episodes No.	Title	Ending Theme	Original release	English release
1	1–4	"Reunion"; Transliteration: "Saikai" (Japanese: 再会)	"I wish (tri. version)" by AiM	November 21, 2015	September 15, 2016
Tai, now in high school, feels downhearted that his friends are slowly drifting apart. Meanwhile, strange occurrences are causing electronic devices to malfunction across Odaiba. Minutes before Tai is set to play a soccer match, Kuwagamon appears and invades the city, causing electronic malfunctions. Just as Tai is cornered, his Digivice shines and Agumon appears. He digivolves into Greymon and fights with Kuwagamon, ending up at Haneda Airport. Tai gives chase by hitching a ride with his homeroom teacher, Daigo Nishijima. As more Kuwagamon appear, Tai is joined by the other DigiDestined and their partner Digimon, who defeat two Kuwagamon before Alphamon intervenes and crushes the last one. After the battle, the DigiDestined investigate the circumstances leading up to Kuwagamon's appearance. Tai and Matt pay a visit to Nishijima, who reveals he is part of an organization monitoring Digimon activity. As Izzy develops ways to provide easier access to their partner Digimon and seek out digital disturbances, Tai begins to fear that people could get hurt as a result of his actions as a DigiDestined. Alphamon appears the next day near the Daikanransha, targeting a Digimon under the care of Meiko Mochizuki, a girl who recently transferred into Tai's class. With Alphamon proving too powerful for the other Digimon, Matt urges Tai to stop running away from his fears, and together they manage to drive Alphamon off with the power of Omnimon. Afterwards, Meiko reveals that she is also a DigiDestined and the targeted Digimon is her partner, Meicoomon.
2	5–8	"Determination"; Transliteration: "Ketsui" (Japanese: 決意)	"Seven (tri. version)" by Kōji Wada	March 12, 2016	July 1, 2017
While Joe stays home to study for his exams, the DigiDestined and their Digimon go on a trip to a hot spring inn, alongside Nishijima and Himekawa. After the trip, Himekawa and Nishijima direct soldiers to use experimental weapons against an infected Ogremon that manifests in Odaiba, but Leomon takes Ogremon back to the Digital World. As Mimi and Meiko prepare for a cheer girl café for the upcoming school festival, Ogremon appears again. When Togemon inadvertently damages a helicopter, Izzy reprimands Mimi for being selfish. After Ogremon is sent back to the Digital World, Leomon visits the Real World, informing the DigiDestined that Ogremon is infected. As Mimi laments her selfishness, she hears from Joe that he is avoiding battles with the Digimon to try cope with adulthood, but loathes his own ineptness. As Gomamon decides to run away from home, Izzy receives an ominous message in digital code. On the day of the school festival, Meiko shows Mimi her support by wearing her cheer girl outfit for the café, while the Digimon sneak into the festival to try and win a costume contest for free food. Afterwards, Gomamon tells Joe that he ran away, because he refused to fight together anymore, causing Joe to angrily storm off. Meicoomon is abducted by what appears to be the Digimon Emperor. Palmon, Gomamon and a now infected Leomon follow them into the digital distortion. As they combat an infected Imperialdramon, Kari urges Joe to fight by his partner's side. After overcoming his insecurities, Joe manages to digivolve Gomamon into Vikemon alongside Mimi who digivolves Palmon into Rosemon. After they defeat Imperialdramon, a traumatized Meicoomon changes form, destroys Leomon and escapes into another distortion.
3	9–13	"Confession"; Transliteration: "Kokuhaku" (Japanese: 告白)	"For Me" (僕にとって, Boku ni Totte) by Knife of Day (Yamato Ishida / Yamato "Matt" Ishida (Yoshimasa Hosoya))	September 24, 2016	July 1, 2017
While Meiko remains traumatized by Meicoomon's betrayal, Izzy becomes irritable as he obsessively tries to determine what caused Meicoomon to become infected. Meanwhile, as malfunctions begin to disrupt airlines, Himekawa and Nishijima tell Matt about their investigation but do not disclose that Meicoomon is causing the malfunctions and that other DigiDestined have gone missing. Later, T.K. discovers something amiss with Patamon when he briefly acts violent and bites him. T.K. decides to take his partner home, prompting the other DigiDestined to do the same. T.K. eventually confesses to Meiko that Patamon is infected. Unbeknownst to T.K., Patamon is already aware of this and tearfully asks T.K. to stop him should the worst happen. The next day as Patamon informs the other Digimon about his infection, Kari becomes possessed by Homeostasis, who cryptically warns them that the infected Digimon could potentially destroy both the Real and Digital Worlds unless a great sacrifice is made. Having overheard them, Himekawa concludes that Homeostasis might trigger a "reboot" to reset the Digital World the next time Meicoomon appears, in order to stop the infection. After Gatomon tells the others that this reboot would also cause them to lose all of their memories, the Digimon prepare for the worst and spend precious time with their partners, during which Agumon tells Tai about the reboot. Izzy discovers that the distortions are the result of the binary code being overwritten by a different language and comes up with a plan after Tentomon informs him of the reboot. When Meicoomon appears at the Tokyo International Exhibition Center, the DigiDestined attempt to keep her out of the Real World and trap her in a digital distortion. Meicoomon responds by digivolving into Meicrackmon. Despite T.K.'s attempts to stop him, Patamon digivolves to Angemon and enters the fray, but is overcome by his infection which soon spreads to the other Digimon. When the countdown for the reboot begins, Izzy reveals his countermeasure before the clock strikes zero: the partner Digimon must be placed within a field containing their backup data in order to preserve their memories. As Tentomon struggles with helping the others while fighting off his own infection, he digivolves into HerculesKabuterimon, captures Meicrackmon, and snaps the Digimon out of their infections, before using all of his strength to push them back into the distortion before the reboot occurs. One week later, Meiko tells T.K. the infection originated six years ago from Meicoomon. Using the power of their Crests, the DigiDestined travel to the rebooted Digital World where they briefly encounter Alphamon fighting Jesmon. They soon reunite with their partner Digimon, who warily befriend them despite having lost their memories. Nearby, Himekawa confronts the Digimon Emperor, who is revealed to resemble Gennai but with a black outfit. Meicoomon is seen hiding behind a bush still possessing her memories of Meiko.
4	14–17	"Loss"; Transliteration: "Sōshitsu" (Japanese: 喪失)	"keep on (tri. version)" by AiM	February 25, 2017	February 1, 2018
As the DigiDestined try to rekindle their friendship with their Rookie level partner Digimon, they briefly come across Meicoomon, who has retained her memories despite the reboot. While the others get along well with their partners, Sora has trouble reconnecting with an amnesiac Biyomon. Later that night, as Tai and Matt try to console Sora, they are suddenly attacked by Machinedramon, whose attack disperses the DigiDestined and Digimon across the Digital World. Meanwhile, Nishijima investigates Himekawa's secret files and remembers her desire to reboot the Digital World to revive her partner Megadramon, who was unable to recompose into a Digi-Egg. Nishijima meets Hackmon, who relays a warning from Homeostasis that King Drasil corrupted Gennai and is targeting "Libra": Meicoomon. At the desert, Sora and Biyomon discover Meiko, who came to the Digital World in search of Meicoomon. When Meicoomon attacks them out of resentment, Meiko manages to placate her. Just then, they are attacked by Gennai who shows his true form after masquerading as the Digimon Emperor. He attempts to capture Meicoomon and Sora's Digivice but is thwarted by the other DigiDestined, who come to their aid. Gennai reveals that the reboot was all part of King Drasil's plan to create a new world order where humans and Digimon no longer interact with each other. He sends Machinedramon and MetalSeadramon after them. Himekawa reunites with Tapirmon, but realizes that he does not remember her. Tai, Matt and Kari manage to strengthen their bonds enough to digivolve their partners and defeat MetalSeadramon. When Sora risks her life to protect Biyomon, she digivolves into Phoenixmon and defeats Machinedramon, alongside Seraphimon and HerculesKabuterimon. Despite this, Gennai attacks Meiko which angers Meicoomon.
5	18–21	"Coexistence"; Transliteration: "Kyōsei" (Japanese: 共生)	"Words of Love" (アイコトバ, Ai Kotoba) by AiM & Ayumi Miyazaki	September 30, 2017	May 10, 2018
An enraged Meicoomon digivolves to Meicrackmon and leaves through a distortion. Himekawa is then briefly seen stumbling across the Digital World in search of Tapirmon. As Digimon begin materializing in the Real World, Hackmon explains to Nishijima and Professor Mochizuki that Meicoomon was born from a fragment of Apocalymon's remnant data. Meiko was meant to suppress the darkness within her partner Digimon. However, Homeostasis considers Meicoomon's unrestrained power to be an existential threat to both worlds and decides to eliminate her. Meanwhile, the DigiDestined try to survive the Digital World's attempts to expel them. The DigiDestined manage to return to the Real World but are persecuted by the people. With Nishijima's help, the DigiDestined and their partner Digimon hide in their school to avoid the media. The DigiDestined try to console Meiko during their stay. The next day, a rampant Meicrackmon confronts Meiko near the school. Jesmon intervenes and his attack results in Meicrackmon digivolving to Raguelmon. As the situation deteriorates, Homeostasis possesses Kari and warns the DigiDestined not to interfere. When Jesmon takes Raguelmon to the Digital World, the DigiDestined, their partner Digimon, and Nishijima pursue them. They arrive in a desert area of the Digital World, where Alphamon joins the fray. Six of the Digimon return to their In-Training forms as a result of Alphamon's attack, leaving only Omnimon, Raguelmon, Alphamon and Jesmon. In the Digital World, a distressed Himekawa is still searching for Tapirmon, but finds herself in the Dark Ocean. When she drowns, Nishijima senses this and laments his inability to save her. Meiko falls into despair and asks the DigiDestined to destroy Raguelmon. Tai resolves to carry out her wish despite the objections of the other DigiDestined. During the battle, a fissure opens causing Tai and Nishijima to fall from the cliff. In the aftermath, Raguelmon is incapacitated near Tai's goggles. Distraught by her brother's disappearance, Kari becomes engulfed in corrupted digital code which causes Nyaromon to dark warp digivolve into Ophanimon Falldown Mode, creating a dark portal. As the portal opens, Ophanimon merges with Raguelmon into Ordinemon. The Real World is subsequently covered by a universal blackout, as the invading Digimon become able to move. Afterwards, the Digital World begins to swallow the Real World. Refusing to give up, Matt takes Tai's goggles and rallies his friends.
6	22–26	"Future"; Transliteration: "Bokura no Mirai" (Japanese: ぼくらの未来)	"Butter-Fly (tri. version)" by the DigiDestined, (Note: Ensemble featuring Taichi Yagami / Taichi "Tai" Kamiya (Natsuki Hanae), Sora Takenouchi (Suzuko Mimori), Yamato Ishida / Yamato "Matt" Ishida (Yoshimasa Hosoya), Kōshirō Izumi / Koshiro "Izzy" Izumi (Mutsumi Tamura), Mimi Tachikawa (Hitomi Yoshida), Joe Kido (Junya Ikeda), Takeru Takaishi / Takeru "T.K." Takaishi (Junya Enoki), Hikari Yagami / Kari Kamiya (M.A.O.), and Meiko Mochizuki (Miho Arakawa).) Digimon Singers, (Note: Ensemble featuring Agumon (Chika Sakamoto), Biyomon (Atori Shigematsu), Gabumon (Mayumi Yamaguchi), Tentomon (Takahiro Sakurai), Palmon (Kinoko Yamada), Patamon (Miwa Matsumoto), Gomamon (Junko Takeuchi), Gatomon (Yuka Tokumitsu), and Meicoomon (Yukiko Morishita).) Ayumi Miyazaki, AiM, with Kōji Wada (Note: Episodes 22 to 25 use the ending theme of part 5, "Words of Love" (アイコトバ, Ai Kotoba) by AiM & Ayumi Miyazaki, as the ending theme.)	May 5, 2018	September 20, 2018
Believing that Tai is dead, the DigiDestined return to the Real World. Meanwhile, Tai and the injured Nishijima wake up in a facility. Nishijima reveals that Davis, Ken, Yolei and Cody are in cryostasis, and were captured, after discovering King Drasil's plan. Gennai appears and stops the life support system, forcing Tai to choose between escaping with the others or saving Nishijima. After Tai enters one of the capsules, the dying Nishijima sends them back to the Real World, before the facility explodes. With Kari still in shock and T.K. tending to her, the other DigiDestined fight Ordinemon, but are defeated. Hackmon informs them of Homeostasis' intent to reboot all digital technology in the Real World to stop Ordinemon. However, it would cripple all man-made infrastructure. Refusing to give up, Matt and the others have Meiko lure Ordinemon to the sea and confront her again but to no avail. Kari overcomes her trauma and has a vision of Gatomon inside Ordinemon, who reveals that all light resides in Meicoomon. Guided by Kari's vision, Izzy discovers that memories from all the Digimon have a backup stored inside Meicoomon, which explains why her memories are intact. Meiko unlocks the sealed memories inside Meicoomon, restoring the lost memories and extracting Gatomon from Ordinemon. The reboot of the Real World is halted by Hackmon. However, King Drasil floods Ordinemon with corrupted data. Tai rejoins the others as they reluctantly digivolve their partner Digimon. During the course of the battle, Meiko's Digivice awakens Omnimon's Merciful Mode. Omnimon destroys Ordinemon, deleting Meicoomon in the process. Gennai leaves through a digital distortion after King Drasil's plans are thwarted. With both worlds restored, Meiko returns to Tottori and Homeostasis shuts down King Drasil. Izzy begins work on a gate that would allow traversal between worlds without D-3s. Three months later on Christmas Eve, Tai converses with Meiko on the phone and Agumon interrupts by declaring that they will always be friends.

== Voice cast ==
The series features the eight DigiDestined (選ばれし子供達, Erabareshi Kodomotachi) and partner Digimon from the original television series. The English dub uses the localized names in Saban Entertainment's English adaptation of the series, while Crunchyroll's subtitled release of the films uses Japanese names for human characters and English names for the Digimon. Some members from the original Japanese and English cast of Digimon Adventure and Digimon Adventure 02 returned to reprise their roles.

This was Philece Sampler's final role as Mimi before her death on July 1, 2021 and Dave Mallow's final role as Angemon before his retirement and death.

Character	Japanese	English
Taichi "Tai" Kamiya (Note: "Taichi Yagami" in the English subtitles.)	Natsuki Hanae	Joshua Seth
Yamato "Matt" Ishida (Note: "Yamato Ishida" in the English subtitles.)	Yoshimasa Hosoya	Vic Mignogna
Sora Takenouchi	Suzuko Mimori	Colleen O'Shaughnessey
Koshiro "Izzy" Izumi (Note: "Kōshirō Izumi" in the English subtitles.)	Mutsumi Tamura	Mona Marshall
Mimi Tachikawa	Hitomi Yoshida	Philece Sampler
Joe Kido	Junya Ikeda	Robbie Daymond
Takeru "T.K." Takaishi (Note: "Takeru Takaishi" in the English subtitles.)	Junya Enoki	Johnny Yong Bosch
Kari Kamiya (Note: "Hikari Yagami" in the English subtitles.)	M.A.O.	Tara Sands
Meiko Mochizuki	Miho Arakawa	Cristina Vee
Agumon	Chika Sakamoto	Tom Fahn; Doug Erholtz (Koromon); Kyle Hebert (Greymon, MetalGreymon, WarGreymon)
Gabumon	Mayumi Yamaguchi	Kirk Thornton
Biyomon	Atori Shigematsu	Cherami Leigh; Melodee Spevack (Birdramon, Garudamon); Mona Marshall (Birdramon, Garudamon, Phoenixmon (Loss))
Tentomon	Takahiro Sakurai	Jeff Nimoy; Joshua Seth (Motimon)
Palmon	Kinoko Yamada	Anna Garduno; Mari Devon (Togemon); Dorothy Elias-Fahn (Lilymon, Rosemon)
Gomamon	Junko Takeuchi	R. Martin Klein; Michael Sorich (Zudomon, Vikemon)
Patamon	Miwa Matsumoto	Laura Summer; Dave Mallow (Angemon); Jamieson Price (Angemon, MagnaAngemon, Seraphimon)
Gatomon	Yuka Tokumitsu	Kate Higgins
Meicoomon	Yukiko Morishita	Kate Higgins
Omnimon	Chika Sakamoto (WarGreymon); Mayumi Yamaguchi (MetalGarurumon)	Kyle Hebert; Kirk Thornton; Micheal Sorich (Future)
Leomon	Hiroaki Hirata	Paul St. Peter
Ogremon	Hisao Egawa	Beau Billingslea
Maki Himekawa	Yūko Kaida	Cherami Leigh
Daigo Nishijima	Daisuke Namikawa	Doug Erholtz
Dark Gennai	Hiroaki Hirata	Jeff Nimoy; Todd Haberkorn (Digimon Emperor)
Homeostasis	M.A.O.	Tara Sands
Announcer	Chiaki Matsuzawa	Dorothy Elias-Fahn
Hackmon	Shunsuke Takeuchi	Aaron LaPlante
Tapirmon	Kaori Ishihara	Colleen O'Shaughnessey
Elecmon	Yasuhiro Takato	Michael Sorich
Yuko Kamiya (Note: Yūko Yagami in the English subtitles.)	Atori Shigematsu	Dorothy Elias-Fahn
Meiko Mochizuki's Mother	Hitomi Yoshida	Colleen O'Shaughnessey
Professor Mochizuki	Yutaka Aoyama	Aaron LaPlante
Narrator	Hiroaki Hirata	John Eric Bentley

== Development ==
A new series was first announced at an event celebrating the 15th anniversary of Digimon Adventure on August 1, 2014. Basic story details were announced on September 7, 2014, after enough fans participated in a game on the official website. On December 13, 2014, Toei Animation announced the series' title, Digimon Adventure tri., with Keitaro Motonaga directing, Yūko Kakihara as screenwriter, and Atsuya Uki as character designer. The series features the returning cast of all eight main Digimon partners from the original series. A continuous stream of all of the original Digimon Adventure episodes was held on Niconico on May 4, 2015, followed by an announcement regarding the new cast for the DigiDestined and broadcast details on May 6, 2015. Daisuke Namikawa and Yūko Kaida joined the cast for the series on September 18, 2015.

On May 6, 2015, it was announced that tri. would be a six-part theatrical film series instead of a television series. The screenwriting team split and arranged important events into six interwoven parts, focusing on the main story while developing the characters' perspectives simultaneously. Motonaga utilized new computer techniques while preserving the atmosphere of the original series.

The first film, Reunion, was released on November 21, 2015. The second film, Determination, was released on March 12, 2016. The third film, Confession, was released on September 24, 2016. The fourth film, Loss, was released on February 25, 2017. The fifth film, Coexistence, was released on September 30, 2017. The last film, Future, was released on May 5, 2018. The films are being streamed outside Japan by Crunchyroll, Hulu, AnimeLab and Tubi TV, as they are released in Japan, with each film split into four or five episodes, making it akin to a usual television series. The films can also be found on Vudu in their entirety for free with ads. Indonesian cinemas CGV Blitz, Cinemaxx, and Platinum Cineplex ran Reunion in their respective theaters nationwide on August 3, 2016. KSM Anime ran Reunion in over 150 cinemas throughout Germany and Austria on May 21, 2017. Germany and Austria also saw theatrical releases of Determination on July 2, 2017, and Confession on August 13, 2017.

=== English-language version ===
An English-language version of Digimon Adventure tri. was distributed in North America by Eleven Arts. The English version uses localized names from Saban Brands' release of the original television series, and reunites several voice actors from the original cast. Eleven Arts CEO Ko Mori stated that the English dub will resemble the Japanese version in tone and style but features a remixed version of the English opening theme, while trying to avoid licensing issues. With the exception of "Digimon Are Back (Again!)" replacing "Butter-Fly (tri. version)" during the opening in the first two parts, in which was later kept in the fourth and sixth parts during the climatic battle, the Japanese score as well as "Brave Heart (tri. version)", "I Wish (tri. version)" and the other five ending themes were kept in the dub.

Reunion premiered at a Fathom Events screening on September 15, 2016 and was released in select North American theaters from September 17, 2016, through October 6, 2016. On January 17, 2017, Shout! Factory announced that they acquired broadcast and home media distribution rights for the first three films, and plan for a dual-language release on DVD, Blu-ray and EST. Confession premiered at an Anime Expo screening on July 1, 2017. On October 26, 2017, Shout! Factory confirmed the release of the remaining films in 2018: Loss premiered on February 1, Coexistence on May 10, and Future on September 20. Reunion was televised January 2, 2018, on Starz Kids & Family and is available for streaming via Starz on Demand. The English dubbed movies are available for rental on Hoopla, as part of a digital distribution deal Cinedigm has with Shout! Factory. The films were added on Steam in North America. The films are also being streamed outside Japan by Crunchyroll.

=== Stage play adaptation ===
A stage play adaptation of Digimon Adventure tri.: The Adventure on August 1 (デジモンアドベンチャーtri.～8月1日の冒険～, Dejimon Adobenchā Torai ～8-gatsu Tsuitachi no Bōken～) ran at the Zepp Blue Theater Roppongi in Tokyo from August 5, 2017, through August 13, 2017. The play was produced by Polygon Magic, with Kenichi Tani serving as script writer and director. The male cast included Gaku Matsumoto as Tai Kamiya, Shohei Hashimoto as Matt Ishida, Kaisei Kamimura as Izzy Izumi, Junya Komatsu as Joe Kido, and Kenta Nomiyama as T.K. Takaishi. The female cast included Suzuka Morita as Sora Takenouchi, Marina Tanoue as Mimi Tachikawa, and Yūna Shigeishi as Kari Kamiya. The Digimon cast featured Oreno Graffiti as Etemon and the original voice actors for the eight partner Digimon. The play had a runtime of 150 minutes which included a 10-minute intermission. Niconico livestreamed an August 12 and August 13 showing of the play, the recording of these performances were available until September 20, 2017. It was released on DVD in Japan on December 2, 2017. An August 13 showing of the play was televised on WOWOW Live in Japan on January 14, 2018, and August 2, 2018.

== Music ==
Kōji Wada returned to perform the Japanese version's theme song "Butter-Fly (tri. version)", while Ayumi Miyazaki performs the insert song, "Brave Heart (tri. version)". The theme song for the English dub is "Digimon Are Back (Again!)" by John Majkut. The ending theme song for Reunion is "I wish (tri. version)" by AiM. The ending theme song for Determination is "Seven (tri. version)" by Wada. The ending theme for Confession is "For Me" (僕にとって, Boku ni Totte) by Knife of Day (Yamato Ishida / Yamato "Matt" Ishida (Yoshimasa Hosoya)). The ending theme for Loss is "keep on (tri. version)" by AiM. The ending theme for Coexistence, as well as the first four parts of Future is "Words of Love" (アイコトバ, Ai Kotoba) by AiM & Ayumi Miyazaki. The ending theme for Future, as well as the final part of the film, is "Butter-Fly (tri. version)" by the DigiDestined, Digimon Singers, Miyazaki, AiM, with Wada.

== Reception ==
=== Box office, sales ===
The first movie earned ¥59 million (about US$480,000) for 36,000 tickets in its opening weekend in Japan. On January 4, 2016, it earned ¥229 million (about US$1.95 million). Reunion had a box office gross of ¥230 million (about US$2.3 million).

The second film earned ¥30 million (about US$265,000) on its first day of screening in Japan, surpassing the day-one box office results of Reunion and earning ¥46 million (about US$407,000) on its opening weekend. On March 31, 2016, it earned ¥144 million (about US$1.29 million). Determination had a box office gross of ¥160 million (about US$1.6 million).

The third movie earned ¥55 million (about US$540,000) within the first four days of its theatrical run. Confession had a box office gross of ¥120 million (about US$1.15 million).

The fourth movie earned ¥61 million (about US$533,000) within the first six days of its theatrical run.

The fifth movie earned ¥94 million (about US$835,000) within the first seventeen days of its theatrical run. Coexistence had a box office gross of ¥100 million (about US$882,457).

In physical sales in Japan, as of January 24, 2016, the first film sells 12,809 Blu-rays and 4,201 DVDs, as of April 17, 2016, the 2nd film sells 11,543 Blu-rays and 37,58 DVDs, as of November 13, 2016, the 3rd film sells 9,677 Blu-rays and 2,738 DVDs, the 4th as of April 16, 2017, 8,306 Blu-rays and 2,878 DVDs, as of November 2017 the 5th film sells 6,047 Blu-rays and 2,130 DVDs and as of June 17, 2018, the final film sells 5,994 Blu-rays and 2,113 DVDs in the limited release.

In the U.S., the first film had a box office gross of $190,581; the fourth film Loss had a US gross of $59,114; the fifth film Coexistence had a US gross of $52,339 and the final film Future had a US box office gross of $54,324.

In Germany, the first movie earned €130,000 for 10,600 tickets sold and €130,304 in Austria for 1,500 tickets. The 2nd film climbed to 24th place in the German box office with 8,400 tickets sold. The 4th film has 7,747 admissions and reached 14th place. The 5th film earned a little less than €80 000 for 6 150 tickets sold, reaching the 18th place in the German box office. The final film sold 6,290 tickets.

=== Critical reception ===
Jacob Chapman of Anime News Network gave the first part, Reunion, a B rating. In his review, he praised the film for its production values and heartwarming fanservice to old-school Digimon fans but noted that very little happens during the first film. He also criticized the episodic format used for streaming, feeling the "episodes" were split up at awkward points in the story due to the film's slow pacing. In his review of the English dub, Chapman described it as an "incredible nostalgia bomb" and praised the performances of the returning cast members. However, he acknowledged that some of the new voice actors had to acclimate to their roles and felt that Vic Mignogna's distinctive voice and extensive anime resume hurt his portrayal of Matt. Chapman also noticed that while the dub featured localized names and a new opening theme, the script remained faithful to the original Japanese version.

For the second film, Determination, Chapman gave a B+ rating. In his review, he praised Mimi and Joe's character development, noting that it was done without neglecting the rest of the cast. He also appreciated the plot twist ending. However, he criticized the drop in animation quality and the lack of combat scenes in comparison to the previous installment. For the third film, Confession, Chapman gave an A rating. In his review, he praised the writing for all the characters as well as the themes exploring the complexity of adolescence. He also notes that the production values have improved from the previous two films. However, he criticized again the animation quality and the lack of combat scenes. For the fourth film, Loss, Chapman gave a C rating. In his review, he found the story to be compelling despite the flawed execution of the plot. He criticized the writing for Sora's character development and felt that her conflict with Biyomon was contrived. Moreover, he was disturbed by Gennai's behavior towards Sora and Meiko. Overall, he noted a drop in animation and production values but praised the animation quality of the combat scenes.

Writing for the French newspaper Le Monde, Yonathan Bartak describes Digimon Adventure tri. as the creation of a "stakhanovist producer who prioritizes quantity over quality, employing animators with too little time, and an outsourced universe", journalist Benjamin Benoit speaks about a foreseeable disappointment "Failed animations, stammering rhythm, an almost non-existent scenario, the whole is reminiscent of the worst moments of the first episodes of the original series."

Writing for Anime News Network, Michael Basile stated that Adventure tri. was failure and a production with a deceptively mature approach after its brief shocking moments, "Drifting away from a group of friends, being unable to let go of the past, having to think about your future and the sacrifices you need to make to achieve your dream – all of these are interesting ideas that are perfect for a Digimon story to explore, but each one gets dropped before it reaches a satisfying conclusion in favor of an ever-complexifying plot and enough technobabble to make Serial Experiments Lain sound simple by comparison.."

Writing for Den of Geek, Shamus Kelley cited Adventure tri. as a failure, criticizing the writing style and convoluted resolutions, the excessive fan service, the use of characters only to "[spout] off pointless anime platitudes," and its lack of ambition and innovation, "It feels like every movie in this series was made independent of each other. Sure there are cool scenes and moments in all of the films but when viewed as a whole they don't thematically tie together. They don't even emotionally tie together."
