= Toshiko Fujita =

Japanese actress (1950-2018)

- 藤田 淑子
- Born: April 5, 1950; Dalian, Liaoning, China
- Died: December 28, 2018 (aged 68); Japan
- Other names: Toco-chan (トコちゃん); Okaru-san (おかるさん)
- Occupations: Actress; voice actress; singer; narrator
- Years active: 1956–2018
- Agent: Aoni Production
- Website: Official profile

Toshiko Fujita (藤田 淑子, Fujita Toshiko; April 5, 1950 – December 28, 2018) was a Japanese actress, singer and narrator. She was affiliated with Aoni Production at the time of her death.

== Biography ==
At the age of eight, Fujita worked in radio and television as an actress, singer and comedian. She also sang theme songs for anime, such as the 1969 adaptation of Dororo.

She also worked as a voice actress for anime series and films, often in works by Toei Animation and Nippon Animation. Notable roles of hers included Ikkyu in Ikkyū-san, Eiichi Kite in Kiteretsu Daihyakka, Taichi Yagami in Digimon Adventure, Mamiya in Fist of the North Star, and Rui Kisugi in Cat's Eye.

In 1984, she received the Best Voice Actor award in the 1st Nihon Anime Taishou.

Later in her career, her work became limited due to poor physical condition and health problems. On December 28, 2018, it was announced that Fujita died of invasive breast cancer at the age of 68.

== Filmography ==
=== Television animation ===
1960s

- Yūsei Shōnen Papii (1965–1966) (Papii)

1970s

- Ikkyū-san (1975–1976) (Ikkyū)

1980s

- Patalliro! (1982–1983) (Maraich Juschenfe)
- Cat's Eye (1983–1985) (Rui Kisugi)
- Koara Bōi Kokki (1984–1985) (Kokki)
- Fist of the North Star (1984) (Mamiya)
- Dragon Ball (1986–1987) (Hasky)
- Prefectural Earth Defense Force (1986) (Yūko Inoue)
- Ginga Nagareboshi Gin (1986) (Cross)
- Space Family Carlvinson (1988) (Mother)
- Kiteretsu Daihyakka (1988–1996) (Eiichi Kite)

1990s

- RG Veda (1991–1992) (Shashi-oh)
- Dragon Quest: The Adventure of Dai (1991–1992) (Dai)
- Romeo's Blue Skies (1995) (Alfredo Martini)
- Kindaichi Case Files (1997) (Koichiro Saeki)
- Digimon Adventure (1999–2000) (Taichi Yagami)
- Outlaw Star (1998) (Hilda)
- Silent Möbius (1998) (Rally Cheyenne)

2000s

- Digimon Adventure 02 (2000–2001) (Taichi Yagami)
- Inuyasha (2002–2003) (Madam Exorcist)
- Glass Mask (2005–2006) (Chigusa Tsukikage)
- Zatch Bell! (2006) (Zofis)
- Deltora Quest (2007–2008) (Theagan)
- Hellsing Ultimate (2008) (Queen of England) (vol. 4)
- Allison & Lillia (2008) (Corazón Muto)
- Ultraviolet: Code 044 (2008) (Onna no Koe)
- Kurozuka (novel) (2008) (Saniwa)

2010s

- Digimon Fusion (2010–2012) (Taichi Yagami)
- Chihayafuru (2011–2013) (Taeko Miyauchi)
- One Piece (2012) ("Big Mom" Charlotte Linlin) (ep. 571)

=== Theatrical animation ===
List of voice performances in theatrical animation
Year	Title	Role	Notes	Source
1968	Andersen Monogatari	Young Hans Christian Andersen		
1969	Puss in Boots	Pierre		
1976	Ikkyū-san	Ikkyū		
1979	Galaxy Express 999	Shadow		
1980	Phoenix 2772	Rena		
1980	Toward the Terra	Mama		
1981	Tomorrow's Joe 2	Additional voice		
1982	Space Adventure Cobra: The Movie	Catherine Flower		
1983	Golgo 13: The Professional	Cindy, Doctor Zed		
1983	Patalliro! Stardust Keikaku	Maraich Juschenfe		
1984	Locke the Superman	Cornelia Prim		
1985	GoShogun: The Time Étranger	Remy's mother		
1986	Running Boy: Star Soldier no Himitsu	Hideki Tōenji		
1987	Saint Seiya: The Movie	Eris		
1991	Dragon Quest: The Adventure of Dai	Dai		
1991	Silent Möbius	Rally Cheyenne		
1992	Dragon Quest: The Great Adventure of Dai 2: Avan's Disciples	Dai		
1992	Tomcat's Big Adventure	Tom		
1993	Bonobono	Bonobono		
1999	Digimon Adventure	Taichi Yagami		
1999	Detective Conan: The Last Wizard of the Century	Seiran Hoshi		
2000	Digimon Adventure: Our War Game!	Taichi Yagami		
2002	Chopper's Kingdom on the Island of Strange Animals	Karasuke		
2002	Doraemon: Nobita in the Robot Kingdom	Maria		
2012	Mardock Scramble: The Third Exhaust	Bell Wing	Final anime film role	

=== Video games ===
- Living Books: Just Grandma and Me (1992) (Little Critter)
- Kessen (2000) (Okatsu)
- Digimon Rumble Arena (2001) (Taichi Yagami)
- Cobra the Arcade (2005) (Jane)
- Shining Force Neo (2005) (Maria)
- Fist of the North Star (2005) (Mamiya)
- Yakuza Kenzan (2008) (Mistress of Tsuruya)
- Sands of Destruction (2008) (Creator)
- Jump Force (2019) (Dai) (Final role)

=== Dubbing roles ===
==== Live-action ====
- 48 Hrs. (1985 NTV edition) (Elaine Marshall (Annette O'Toole))
- Above the Law (1993 TV Asahi edition) (Delores "Jacks" Jackson (Pam Grier))
- Air Force One (U.S. Vice President Kathryn Bennett (Glenn Close))
- Alfie (Liz (Susan Sarandon))
- Beverly Hills Cop (1988 TV Asahi edition) (Jeanette "Jenny" Summers (Lisa Eilbacher))
- Blue Velvet (Dorothy Vallens (Isabella Rossellini))
- Coogan's Bluff (Julie Roth (Susan Clark))
- DeepStar Six (Joyce Collins (Nancy Everhard))
- Dharma & Greg (Katherine "Kitty" Montgomery (Susan Sullivan))
- Edward Scissorhands (1994 TV Asahi edition) (Peg Boggs (Dianne Wiest))
- Elizabeth R (Elizabeth I of England)
- Elizabethtown (Hollie Baylor (Susan Sarandon))
- The Exorcist (2001 NTV edition) (Chris MacNeil (Ellen Burstyn))
- Friends with Benefits (Lorna (Patricia Clarkson))
- Georgia Rule (Georgia Randall (Jane Fonda))
- Good Bye, Lenin! (Christiane Kerner (Katrin Sass))
- The Goonies (1988 TBS edition) (Mikey (Sean Astin))
- Halloween (Laurie Strode (Jamie Lee Curtis))
- The Jane Austen Book Club (Bernadette (Kathy Baker))
- The Lovely Bones (Grandma Lynn (Susan Sarandon))
- Mary, Queen of Scots (Elizabeth I)
- Murphy Brown (Murphy Brown (Candice Bergen))
- National Lampoon's Christmas Vacation (Ellen Griswold (Beverly D'Angelo))
- Sabrina the Teenage Witch (Zelda Spellman (Beth Broderick))
- The Stepford Wives (Claire Wellington (Glenn Close))
- Stuart Little (Mrs. Keeper (Julia Sweeney))
- Tequila Sunrise (Jo Ann Vallenari (Michelle Pfeiffer))
- This Boy's Life (Caroline Wolff Hansen (Ellen Barkin))

==== Animation ====
- Cinderella (Drizella Tremaine)
- Lady and the Tramp (Lady)
- Lady and the Tramp II: Scamp's Adventure (Lady)
- Stuart Little 3: Call of the Wild (The Beast)
- Tarzan (Kala)
- Tarzan II (Kala)
- Tom and Jerry (Jerry and Nibbles) (original series)
- Balto II: Wolf Quest (Jenna)
- Balto III: Wings of Change (Jenna)
- The Flight of Dragons (Danielle)
