= Reiko Yoshida =

Japanese screenwriter (born 1967)

- 吉田 玲子
- Born: December 31, 1967 (age 58); Hiroshima, Japan
- Occupation: Screenwriter

Reiko Yoshida (吉田 玲子, Yoshida Reiko; born December 31, 1967) is a Japanese screenwriter. She has written and supervised numerous screenplays for anime series, live-action dramas and films. Her major works include Kaleido Star, Aria, Maria-sama ga Miteru, D.Gray-man, K-On!, Bakuman, and Girls und Panzer. In more recent works, she has supervised the screenplays for Majestic Prince, Non Non Biyori, A Town Where You Live, Tamako Market, Yowamushi Pedal, and Castle Town Dandelion. In films, she wrote the screenplay for The Cat Returns, the original films that would make up Digimon: The Movie, Kyoto Animation's hit anime film A Silent Voice, and the film adaptations of Osamu Tezuka's Buddha, the second film of which was given a stamp of approval by the Dalai Lama. She wrote the story for the manga series Tokyo Mew Mew along with illustrator Mia Ikumi. Among her works, she was recognized for Best Screenplay/Original Work for Girls und Panzer at the Tokyo Anime Award Festival in 2014, and she won another Best Screenplay/Original Work award in 2017. In 2018, she wrote the screenplay for Violet Evergarden which aired on TV in Japan and is licensed by Netflix. Her latest project is the animated series The Heike Story, produced with animation studio Science Saru. She has been announced to be writer for a Pokemon mini-anime.

== Works ==
=== Anime ===
List of production work in anime
Year	Title	Crew role	Notes	Source
1995–96	Virtua Fighter	Script		
1996–97	Mizuiro Jidai	Script		
1996–97	Boys Over Flowers	Script		
1997–99	Yume no Crayon Oukoku	Script		
1997–98	Fortune Quest L	Script		
1999	Digimon Adventure	Screenplay	short film, part 1 of 3 of Digimon: The Movie	
1999–00	Kaikan Phrase	Script		
1999	Saiyuki	Script supervisor	OVA	
2000	Digimon Adventure: Our War Game!	Screenplay	short film, part 2 of 3 of Digimon: the Movie	
2000	Digimon Adventure 02: Digimon Hurricane Landing!! / Transcendent Evolution!! The Golden Digimentals	Screenplay	film, part 3 of 3 of Digimon: the Movie	
2000	Ojarumaru the Movie: The Promised Summer – Ojaru and Semira	Screenplay	short film	
2000	Street Fighter Alpha: The Animation	Screenplay	OVA film	
2001	Digimon Adventure 02: Revenge of Diaboromon	Screenplay	short film	
2001	Angelic Layer	Script	Episodic (Note: Yoshida was one of several scriptwriters who rotated episode writing duties for the TV series)	
2001–03	Kasumin	Script supervisor	3 seasons	
2001	Rurouni Kenshin: Reflection	Screenplay	OVA	
2002	Jing: King of Bandits	Script supervisor		
2002	The Cat Returns	Screenplay	film	
2002–03	Getbackers	Script		
2003	Digi-giri Pop!	Script		
2003–04	Kaleido Star	Script supervisor	TV series (2 seasons) and 2 OVAs (2004, 2006)	
2003	Scrapped Princess	Script supervisor		
2003	Gad Guard	Script		
2003–04	Popolocrois	Script supervisor		
2004	Maria-sama ga Miteru	Script supervisor	TV series 1st season only	
2004	Jing: King of Bandits in Seventh Heaven	Screenplay	OVA series	
2004–05	Miracle! Panzo ja:みらくる! ぱんぞう	Script supervisor		
2004	Maria-sama ga Miteru: Printemps	Script		
2004–05	School Rumble	Script	Episodic	
2004	Genshiken	Script	Episodic	
2005	Emma: A Victorian Romance	Script	Episodic	
2005–06	Mushiking: The King of Beetles	Script supervisor		
2005–06	Sugar Sugar Rune	Script supervisor		
2005–06	Canvas 2: Niji Iro no Sketch	Script supervisor		
2005	Aria the Animation	Script	Episodic	
2005	Kaleido Star: Legend of Phoenix	Script supervisor	TV film	
2006	Rec	Script Supervisor		
2006	Ballad of a Shinigami	Script supervisor		
2006–07	The Story of Saiunkoku	Script supervisor		
2006	Jyu-Oh-Sei	Script supervisor		
2006	God Family	Script	TV series, Eps. 6, 12	
2006–07	La Corda d'Oro: Primo passo	Script supervisor	TV series	
2006–07	Ghost Hunt	Script	TV series	
2006–08	D.Gray-man	Script supervisor	TV series, 4 seasons	
2006–07	Maria-sama ga Miteru	Script supervisor	3rd season OVA series	
2007–08	Deltora Quest	Script		
2007	Romeo × Juliet	Script supervisor	TV series	
2007	Mushi-Uta	Script supervisor	TV series	
2008	Our Home's Fox Deity	Script supervisor		
2009	Maria-sama ga Miteru	Script supervisor	4th season	
2009	Kurokami: The Animation	Script supervisor		
2009	La Corda d'Oro: Secondo Passo	Script	TV special	
2009–11	K-On!	Script supervisor		
2009	Tales of Vesperia: The First Strike	Screenplay	film	
2010	Chu-Bra!!	Script supervisor		
2010	Nodame Cantabile Finale	Script		
2010–13	Bakuman	Script supervisor	TV series (3 seasons)	
2010	Tamayura	Script	OVA series	
2011	Adult Women's Anime Time (Otona Joshi no Anime Time)	Script	TV special	
2011	Buddha: The Great Departure	Screenplay	film	
2011	Mayo Chiki!	Script supervisor	TV series	
2011	Tamayura: Hitotose	Script	TV series	
2011–12	Kimi to Boku	Script supervisor	2 seasons	
2011	K-On! The Movie!	Screenplay		
2012–13	Saint Seiya Omega	Script supervisor		
2012–13	Girls und Panzer	Script supervisor	Tokyo Anime Award Festival, Best Screenplay/Original Work, 2014	
2012	Student Council's Discretion Lv. 2	Script supervisor	ONA series and OVA (2013)	
2012	Blue Exorcist: The Movie	Screenplay	film	
2013	Mangirl!	Script supervisor		
2013	Tamako Market	Script supervisor	TV series	
2013	Adult Women's Anime Time (Otona Joshi no Anime Time)	Script	2nd TV series, Ep. "Jinsei Besutoten"	
2013	Majestic Prince	Script supervisor	TV series, Nominated – 3rd Newtype Anime Awards, Script. Also TV special and film (2016)	
2013	A Town Where You Live	Script supervisor	TV series and OVA (2014)	
2013–15	Yowamushi Pedal	Script supervisor	OVA, TV series (2 seasons), and 2 films	
2013	Non Non Biyori	Script supervisor	Also Repeat (2015), Vacation (2018), and Nonstop (2021)	
2014	Witch Craft Works	Script	also OVA (2015)	
2014	The Pilot's Love Song	Script		
2014	Buddha 2: Tezuka Osamu no Buddha – Owarinaki Tabi	Screenplay	film	
2014	Tamako Love Story	Screenplay	film	
2014	Girls und Panzer: This is the Real Anzio Battle!	Script supervisor	OVA	
2014	Hanayamata	Script supervisor and Script	TV series	
2015	Castle Town Dandelion	Script supervisor	TV series	
2015	Yowamushi Pedal: The Movie	Screenplay	film	
2015–16	Aria the Avvenire	Script	OVA series	
2016	Haruchika	Script supervisor	TV series	
2016	High School Fleet	Script supervisor	TV series	
2016	A Silent Voice	Screenplay	film	
2017	Lu Over the Wall	Screenplay	film	
2018	Liz and the Blue Bird	Screenplay	film, part of the Sound! Euphonium series	
2020	Arte	Script supervisor	TV series	
2021	The House of the Lost on the Cape	Screenplay	film	
2021	The Heike Story	Script supervisor	TV series	
2021	Blue Period	Script supervisor	TV series	
2021	Hula Fulla Dance	Script supervisor	film	
2022	Deaimon	Script supervisor	TV series	
2024	Dead Dead Demon's Dededede Destruction	Screenplay	2 films and ONA series	
2024	The Colors Within	Screenplay	film	
2026	Paris ni Saku Étoile	Screenplay	film	

=== Live-action ===
List of production work in live-action television shows, videos and films
Year	Title	Crew role	Notes	Source
1999	Bunny Knights	Script		
2000	Office Lady's Beauty Battle (ja:OLヴィジュアル系, OL Vuuijuaru-kei)	Script		
2001	Dreams of Romance	Script		
2001	Parfum de la Jelouise (ja:嫉妬の香り, Shittonokaori; Also Scent of Jealousy)	Script		
2002	Transparent	Script		
2002	Satorare (ja:サトラレ)	Script		
2007	Time Limit Investigator 2 (帰ってきた時効警察, Kaettekita Jikookeisatsu)	Script		
2013	Shiromajo Gakuen	Screenplay		
2015	Innocent Lilies: The End and the Beginning (白魔女学園 オワリトハジマリ, Shiromajo Gakuen Owaritohajimari)	Screenplay	sequel	
2020	Kotera-san Climbs!	Screenplay		
2022	Teen Regime	Screenplay		

=== Manga ===
Title	Year	Notes	Refs
Kirameki no meikyu (きらめきの迷宮, Labyrinth of Sparkle)	1998	Original story. Illustrated by Kuni Arisaka; Published by Judy Comics for 3 volumes	
Ai no hate ni (愛の果てに, The Ends of the Love)	1999	Original story. Illustrated by Kuni Arisaka; Published by Judy Comics for 4 volumes	
Tokyo Mew Mew	2000–03	Writer. Illustrated by Mia Ikumi. Serialized in Nakayoshi magazine Published by Kodansha for 7 volumes	
Romeo × Juliet	2007–09	Writer. Illustrated by Hiroki Harada. Serialized in Monthly Asuka magazine Published by Kadokawa Shoten for 2 volumes	—

=== Novels ===
Title	Year	Notes	Refs
Sōgen no Kagayaki	2023	Published by Kyoto Animation in their KA Esuma Bunko imprint	
