= Kuro no Tenshi =

Kuro no tenshi (The Black Angel) a.k.a. 黒の天使 may refer to two films:

- Kuro no tenshi Vol. 1 (1997)
- Kuro no tenshi Vol. 2 (1999)
