= Miwa Matsumoto =

Japanese voice actress (born 1971)

- 松本 美和
- Born: 15 December 1971 (age 54); Fukuoka Prefecture, Japan
- Occupation: Voice actress
- Years active: 1990–present
- Height: 151 cm (4 ft 11 in)

Miwa Matsumoto (松本 美和, Matsumoto Miwa; born December 15, 1971) is a Japanese voice actress.

== Filmography ==
=== Television ===
- Digimon Adventure – Patamon
- Digimon Adventure 02 – Patamon
- Digimon Tamers – Mako
- Digimon Frontier – Kokuwamon
- Cardcaptor Sakura – Chiharu Mihara
- Cardcaptor Sakura: Clear Card – Chiharu Mihara
- Fruits Basket (2001) – Rika Aida (ep22)
- Wedding Peach – Jama-P
- Nurse Angel Ririka SOS – Rumi

=== Film ===
- Cardcaptor Sakura Movie 2: The Sealed Card – Chiharu Mihara
- Digimon Adventure tri. – Patamon
- Digimon Adventure: Last Evolution Kizuna – Patamon
- Digimon Frontier: Ancient Digimon Revival – Pucchiemon

=== Video games ===
- Digimon Adventure – Patamon
