= SAE =

SAE, sae, or Sae may refer to:

== Science and technology ==
- Selective area epitaxy, local growth of epitaxial layer through a patterned dielectric mask deposited on a semiconductor substrate
- Sepsis-associated encephalopathy, neurological complications of sepsis
- Serious adverse event, in a clinical trial
- Simultaneous Authentication of Equals, a password authentication protocol in computer networking
- Sparse autoencoder, a class of text encoders in machine learning
- Subcortical arteriosclerotic encephalopathy, a disease
- Sum of absolute errors, in mathematics
- Supervised agricultural experience
- System Architecture Evolution, the core network architecture of 3GPP's LTE wireless communication standard

=== Units and standards ===
- SAE, units named after the Society of Automotive Engineers:
  - SAE, several units of horsepower
  - SAE viscosity number, of motor oils
  - SAE steel grades
  - SAE fastener
  - SAE thread
  - United States customary units, tools and fasteners with sizes measured in inches

== Linguistics ==
- South African English, the first-language dialects of English spoken by South Africans
- Standard Average European, a sprachbund consisting of the major part of the Indo-European languages
- Standard American English (disambiguation), the standardized form of written American English
- Southern American English, a regional dialect or collection of dialects

== Organizations ==
- SAE Institute (formerly the School of Audio Engineering), a private college founded in 1976
  - SAE Online (formerly SAE Graduate college), distance learning programs run by SAE Institute
- SAE International (originally the Society of Automotive Engineers), a U.S.-based, global professional association and standards developing organization
- SAE Renewables (formerly SIMEC Atlantis Energy) a renewable energy company incorporated in Singapore, with headquarters in Edinburgh
- SAE – World Council of Hellenes Abroad, representing people of Greek ethnic descent
- Secretaria de Assuntos Estratégicos, the Brazilian Intelligence Agency
- Sigma Alpha Epsilon, a fraternity
- Society of Accountants in Edinburgh, a predecessor of the Institute of Chartered Accountants of Scotland
- Soviet Antarctic Expedition, a Soviet research institute
- Stichting Academisch Erfgoed, a Dutch organization

== Places ==
- Sae, Harju County, village in Kose Parish, Harju County, Estonia
- Sae, Lääne-Viru County, village in Vinni Parish, Lääne-Viru County, Estonia
- Sae Island, an island within the Western Islands of the Bismarck Archipelago, Papua New Guinea
- Sale railway station, Victoria (station code: SAE), Australia
- Shah Alam Expressway, an expressway in Klang Valley, Malaysia

== Other uses ==
- Sae (given name), a feminine Japanese given name
- Société anonyme égyptienne (Egyptian Anonymous Society), Egyptian variant of S.A.
- Stamped addressed envelope

== See also ==
- Sexual assault evidence collection kit (SAECK), in forensics
