= Tachikawa (surname) =

Tachikawa (written: 立川) is a Japanese surname. Notable people with the surname include:

- Akira Tachikawa, Japanese opera singer
- Keiji Tachikawa (立川 敬二, born 1939), Japanese businessman and president of the Japan Aerospace Exploration Agency
- Kotaro Tachikawa (立川 小太郎, born 1997), Japanese footballer
- Kyouichi Tachikawa (立川 京一, born 1966), Japanese historian
- Megumi Tachikawa (立川 恵), Japanese manga artist
- Sae Tachikawa (立川 サエ, 1889–1990), Japanese-American educator
- Tachikawa Sumito (立川清登, 1929–1985), Japanese operatic baritone, radio host, and television personality
- Takashi Tachikawa (立川 隆史, born 1975), Japanese baseball player
- Yuzuru Tachikawa (立川 譲, born 1981), Japanese director

== Fictional characters ==
- Mimi Tachikawa (太刀川 ミミ), a character in the anime series Digimon Adventure
