= Tachikawa (disambiguation) =

Tachikawa is a city located in Tokyo, Japan.

Tachikawa may also refer to:

- Tachikawa (surname), a Japanese surname
- Tachikawa, Yamagata
- Tachikawa-ryu
- Tachikawa Airfield
- Tachikawa Aircraft Company
