= Sae (given name) =

- Gender: Female

Origin
- Origin: Japanese
- Meaning: Different meanings depending on the kanji used

Sae (written: 紗英, 紗江, 佐江, 沙恵, 三重, 彩恵, さえ in hiragana or サエ in katakana) is a feminine Japanese given name. Notable people with the name include:

- Sae Isshiki (一色 紗英; born 1977), Japanese actress
- Sae Itō (伊藤 沙恵; born 1993), Japanese shogi player
- Sae Miyakawa (宮川 紗江; born 1999), Japanese artistic gymnast
- Sae Miyazawa (宮澤 佐江; born 1990), Japanese singer and actress
- Sae Murase (村瀬 紗英; born 1997), Japanese singer
- Sae Nakazawa (中澤 さえ; born 1983), Japanese judoka
- Sae Tachikawa (立川 サエ; 1889–1990), Japanese educator
- Sae Watanabe (渡辺 三重; born 1968), Japanese gymnast
- Sae Yamamoto (curler) (山本 冴; born 2001), Japanese curler
- Sae, former percussionist for Japanese heavy metal music ensemble Hanabie.

== Fictional characters ==
- Sae, a character in the manga series Hidamari Sketch
- Sae, a character from the manga and anime Twin Star Exorcists
- Sae Chabashira, a character from the light novel and anime series Classroom of the Elite
- Sae Itoshi, a character in the manga and anime series Blue Lock
- Sae Iwata, the main protagonist of the manga and anime series A Star Brighter Than the Sun
- Sae Kashiwagi, a character in the manga and anime series Peach Girl
- Sae Kirino, a character in the video game and anime series Little Battlers Experience
- Sae Kurosawa, a character from the horror video game Fatal Frame II: Crimson Butterfly
- Sae Niijima, a character in the video game Persona 5
- Sae Taiga, a character in the tokusatsu series Hyakujuu Sentai Gaoranger
