= Yūto Kazama =

Japanese voice actor

Atsushi Niino (新野 敦史, Niino Atsushi; born September 30, 1970), known professionally as Yūto Kazama (風間 勇刀, Kazama Yūto), is a Japanese voice actor affiliated with Aksent. He is most well known for his role in Digimon Adventure, in which he voiced the character Yamato Ishida, and the protagonist of the Mega Man Zero series, Zero.

== Filmography ==
=== Anime ===
- Ask Dr. Rin! (Takashi Tokiwa)
- Bakuman 2 (Soichi Aida)
- Buso Renkin (Hideyuki Okakura)
- Cromartie High School (Noboru Yamaguchi)
- Digimon Adventure (Yamato Ishida, Gazimon, MetalSeadramon)
- Digimon Adventure 02 (Yamato Ishida, Oldest Boi Brother, Kuwagamon, Mr. Washington)
- Digimon Adventure (2020) (Valdurmon)
- Kanokon (Saku Ezomori)
- LINE TOWN (James)
- Pocket Monsters (Homura)
- The Prince of Tennis (Billy Cassidy)
- Psychic Academy (Jyuo)
- Rockman EXE Axess (SparkMan)
- Rockman EXE Beast (Zoano SparkMan)
- Shooting Star Rockman Tribe (Yeti)
- To Love-Ru (Decamarron)
- Transformers: Galaxy Force (FangWolf/Snarl)
- Wangan Midnight (Yasuhiko Miki)

=== Video games ===
- Mega Man Zero series (Zero, Copy X)
- Mega Man ZX (Girouette, Model Z)
- Rockman ZX Advent (Model Z)
- SNK vs. Capcom: SVC Chaos (Zero)

=== Drama CDs ===
- Mayonaka ni Oai Shimashou (Ryuuji Matsuura)

=== Dubbing ===
- Power Rangers Lost Galaxy (Deviot)
- Marie Antionette (King Louis XVI)
