= Melodee Spevack =

American voice actress (active (1979–present)

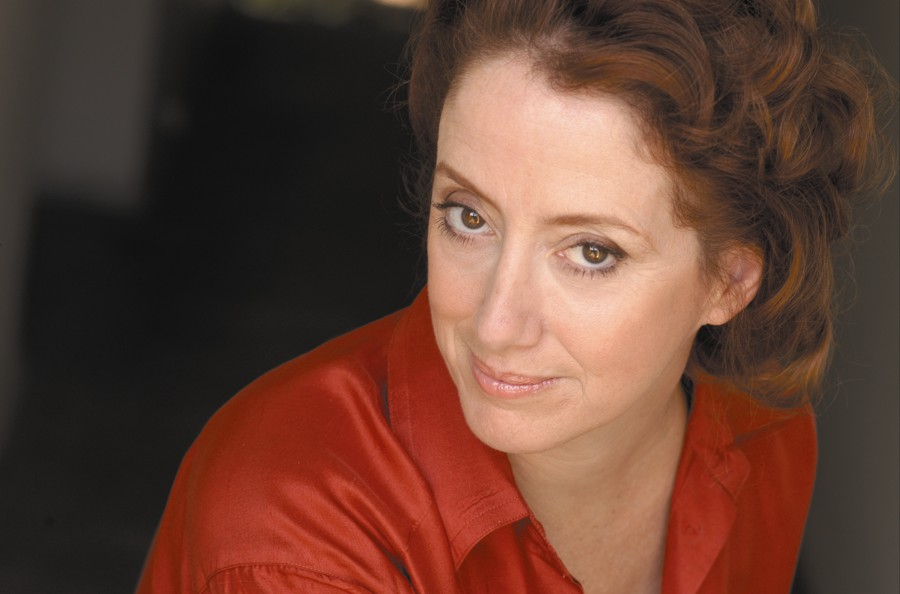
- Born: Melodee M. Spevack; 1953 (age 72–73); Chicago, Illinois, U.S.
- Education: University of Miami (B.F.A.)
- Occupation: Actress
- Years active: 1979–present
- Agent: RSA Talent

Melodee M. Spevack is an American voice actress who has worked on-camera and as a voiceover artist for video games, looping for television and film, original animation, and English-language adaptations of Japanese anime shows.

== Filmography ==
=== Anime ===
List of voice performances in anime
Year	Title	Role	Notes	Source
1990	Dragon Ball	Mai	Harmony Gold dub (Ep. 1-5); Renamed "Femina" for this version	
1988	Tales of Little Women	Aunt Martha March		
	Monster	Various characters		
1998	Cowboy Bebop	VT		
2005-2007	Bobobo-bo Bo-bobo	Torpedo Girl		
1999	Digimon Adventure	Birdramon, Garudamon, LadyDevimon, Blossomon		
2000	Digimon Adventure 02	Birdramon, Garudamon, LadyDevimon		
2002	Digimon Frontier	Crusadermon, Togemon		
2007	Digimon Data Squad	Blossomon		
	Flint the Time Detective	Eldora, Elvira, others		
1995	Teknoman	Sword, others		
	Boys Be	Seiko Kurumizawa		
1994	Dirty Pair: Flight 005 Conspiracy	Booking Terminal Persona; Lila	OVA	
2002	Carried by the Wind: Tsukikage Ran	Lady Oyu, Otsuta, others		
2002	Armitage: Dual Matrix	BFNN Newscaster		
2003	Argento Soma	Cmdr. Lana Ines, others		
2003	Geneshaft	Gloria, Hiroto's Mother, others		
2004	.hack//Legend of the Twilight	Kamui		
2004	Burn-Up Scramble	Monica Green		
2005	Samurai Champloo	Oryuu, Prostitute		
2005	Saiyuki Reload	Merciful Goddess		
2005	Stratos 4: Return to Base	Rin Mikuriya	OVA	
2005	Paranoia Agent	Misae Ikari		
2005	The Twelve Kingdoms	Ribi		
2006	Hare+Guu	Bell		
2006	Saiyuki Reload Gunlock	Merciful Goddess		
2006	Tenchi Muyo! Ryo-Ohki	Mikami Kuramitsu	OVA 3 + Special	
2006	Ergo Proxy	Derrida		

=== Western Animation ===
List of voice performances in western animation
Year	Title	Role	Notes
2017-2019	OK K.O.! Let's Be Heroes	Foxtail	

=== Film ===
List of voice performances in direct-to-video and television films
Year	Title	Role	Notes	Source
1987	Lensman: Power of The Lens	Additional voices	Harmony Gold dub	
1987	Once Upon a Time (a.k.a. Windaria)	Shadowland Queen; Juliet 2		
1987	Robotech II: The Sentinels	Earth Fleet Announcements		
1989	Dragon Ball	Mai	Harmony Gold dub Special edited from first and third films	
1991	Fist of the North Star	Julia	Streamline dub	
2007	Winx Club: The Secret of the Lost Kingdom	Mandragora	Dubbing Brothers dub	
2016–2018	Digimon Adventure tri.	Birdramon, Garudamon	Limited theatrical release	
2017	In This Corner of The World	Kiseno Urano	Limited theatrical release	

=== Video games ===
List of voice performances in video games
Year	Title	Role	Notes	Source
2004	Seven Samurai 20XX	Village Chief		
2004	Digimon Rumble Arena 2	Birdramon/Garudamon, Angewomon		
	World of Warcraft: Wrath of the Lich King			
2006	Baten Kaitos Origins	Yulfee		
2007	Digimon World Data Squad	Biyomon/Birdramon, Garudamon		
2008	Lost Odyssey	Maia		
1993	Star Trek: Judgment Rites			
1992	Star Trek: 25th Anniversary			
1994	Inherit the Earth			
1996	Normality			
1994	Boogerman			
1995	Stonekeep			
2009	Final Fantasy Crystal Chronicles: The Crystal Bearers	Additional voices		
2006	Valkyrie Profile 2: Silmeria	Lady Cleo		

=== Live action ===
List of acting performances in film and television
Year	Title	Role	Notes	Source
2004	Princess Diaries II			
1988	Spellbinder			
	Enterprise			
	The Division			
	The Man Show			
1995	The Secret World of Dreams		TV special	
	What Should You Do?		Segment "Bank Robber"	
	Freddy's Nightmares			
	Rescue 911			
	The Jeffersons			
	Star Trek: Odyssey			
