= Digimon Digital Card Battle =

2000 video game

- Developer: BEC
- Publisher: Bandai
- Producer: Takayuki Shindo
- Series: Digimon
- Platform: PlayStation
- Release: JP: December 21, 2000; NA: June 28, 2001; EU: July 5, 2002
- Genres: Digital collectible card game, Strategy

Digimon Digital Card Battle, originally released in Japan as Digimon World: Digital Card Arena (Japanese: デジモンワールド デジタルカードアリーナ, Hepburn: Dejimonwārudo Dejitaru Kādo Arīna), is a video game based on the Digimon Collectible Card Game for the PlayStation. It was developed by BEC and published by Bandai, and was first made available in Japan in December 2000, with English releases in North America and Europe arriving in June 2001 and July 2002, respectively.

== Gameplay ==
The game is very different from the other Digimon releases since it is a totally card-based game. Players have a deck of 30 cards, consisting of Digimon, support and special evolution cards. The evolution concept is similar to the other games, in that players start off with Child and finish with a Perfect (missing out Fresh, Fresh II and Ultimate, although Ultimate Digimon appear as Perfect). Players sacrifice Digimon in their hand in order to build up "evolution points" or DP. When one has enough for their desired Digimon, evolution becomes possible. This brings a new tactical element to the game: deciding which cards to sacrifice.

As the game starts off players are able to choose one of three Digimon to be their first Partner card (Veemon, Hawkmon and Armadillomon). As the game progresses these partners will gain experience, become stronger and gain the ability to Armor evolve. As this ability is used the partner loses the ability to evolve into Adult (A) or Perfect (P) levels. Players can have multiple partners in a deck. As the player's partners attain new ranks, they gain parts, which can be used to modify partners to boosts its hit points (health), attack power or support effect. The others can be gained by beating certain opponents a certain number of times and partner fusing.

== Reception ==
Reception

Aggregate scores
Aggregator	Score
GameRankings	57.81%
Metacritic	51/100

Review scores
Publication	Score
Famitsu	28/40
Game Informer	7.5/10
GamePro	2.5/5
GameSpot	5.1/10

Digimon Digital Card Battle earned a 28 out of 40 total score from Japanese Weekly Famitsu magazine, and received generally mixed reviews from English-speaking critics, with a 57% overall score from GameRankings, and a 51 out of 100 average from Metacritic.

GameSpot's Gerald Villoria felt that while the title "accurately duplicates the flow and gameplay of the tabletop game, its simplicity will turn off any but the youngest of players," recommending it only to those who either enjoyed the real-life card game or "diehard" fans of the Digimon anime. The editor did find that the polygon-rendered battle animations were "done nicely enough" but also added "considerable" downtime to matches and that "more impatient players will prefer the faster pace when graphical battles are toggled off." Electronic Gaming Monthly shared a similar sentiment that the game itself didn't have enough merit beyond the branding, adding that "unless digi-fans…existed, most would not care two digi-bits about DDCB after playing two digi-seconds." GamePro stated that the game "can become addictive after you master its confounding rules" but that it was hindered by "unpredictable card draws that cause the matches to vacillate between frustrating and extremely boring."
