= List of Digimon Adventure characters =

A group image depicting the DigiDestined featured in Digimon Adventure. Also present in the back row are Gennai in a Mekanorimon, Ogremon, and Centarumon, and in the front, Elecmon.

Digimon Adventure, Digimon Adventure 02, Digimon Adventure tri., Digimon Adventure: Last Evolution Kizuna (DA:LEK), Digimon Adventure 02: The Beginning (02:TB), and the 2020 reboot of Digimon Adventure, productions of Toei Animation for the Digimon franchise, are centered on the DigiDestined (選ばれし子供達, Erabareshi Kodomotachi; Chosen Children), a group of children chosen to protect the Digital World. Each child is partnered with a Digimon and use a Digivice (Note: A Digivice (デジヴァイス, Dejivaisu), based on Bandai's Digital Monster virtual pet toy, is a digital device that the DigiDestined use to enter the Digital World and help their Digimon partners Digivolve.) to help them Digivolve (進化, shinka; lit. 'evolve') into stronger forms.

The main DigiDestined cast was designed by Katsuyoshi Nakatsuru. Producer Satoru Nishizono and the staff used a name analysis software to decide on the characters' names, using kanji combinations that related to "luck". For Digimon Adventure tri., director Keitaro Motonaga found that some parts of developing the characters were "difficult to control" due to the characters' "strong personalities", but the staff had "rebuilt" the characters by taking account of their personal growth while retaining their original personalities. A new group of DigiDestined, in addition to T.K. and Kari, were made into the new main cast for Digimon Adventure 02, consisting of Davis, Yolei, Cody, and later Ken.

== Main characters ==
=== Adventure protagonists ===
Taichi "Tai" Kamiya (八神 太一, Yagami Taichi)
Voiced by: Toshiko Fujita (Adventure/02), Natsuki Hanae (tri./DA:LEK), Yūko Sanpei (2020 reboot) (Japanese); Joshua Seth, Wendee Lee (one line in "Nanomon of the Labyrinth!"), Jason Spisak (Revenge of Diaboromon), Zeno Robinson (2020 reboot) (English)
Tai is the main protagonist of the story and the leader of the DigiDestined, the star player on the school's soccer team and Kari's older brother. His aggressive, impulsive, and rebellious personality often puts him in danger, but he learns that empathy and compassion are the keys to being a successful leader. A trademark of Tai's character design is his goggles, which carries over to the leader character of subsequent entries in the franchise. He is partnered with Agumon and holds the Crest of Courage (勇気の紋章, Yūki no monshō).
Tai passed on leadership to Davis during the events of Digimon Adventure 02 while attending middle school. During the events of Digimon Adventure tri., Tai bonds with Daigo Nishijima and is inspired by the man to seek out a career in diplomacy. The Digimon Adventure 02 series epilogue depicts Tai and Agumon becoming diplomats for their respective world, and Tai having a son who is partnered to a Koromon.
Yamato "Matt" Ishida (石田 ヤマト, Ishida Yamato)
Voiced by: Yūto Kazama (Adventure/02), Yoshimasa Hosoya (tri./DA:LEK), Daisuke Namikawa (2020 reboot) (Japanese); Michael Reisz (Adventure/02), Vic Mignogna (tri.), Nicolas Roye (DA:LEK), A.J. Beckles (2020 reboot) (English)
Matt is secondary protagonist of story and T.K.'s older brother. (Note: The English version made an error where Matt says they're half-brothers.) He lives in Odaiba with his single father after his parents divorced three years prior. He takes caution in the Digital World, especially when it comes to T.K.'s safety, and he often clashes with Tai, due to the latter's recklessness. He is partnered with Gabumon and holds the Crest of Friendship (友情の紋章, Yūjō no monshō). He is known to resent Tai for being seen as the leader of the DigiDestined by the others, during which they sometimes argue and clash.
In Digimon Adventure 02, Matt forms a band with his classmates called the Teen-age Wolves and provides lead vocals and bass. In Digimon Adventure tri., he becomes the vocalist and bassist of Knife of Day after the Teen-age Wolves disbands. In the series' epilogue, Matt and Gabumon become astronauts. Matt marries Sora, and they have two children; a daughter with a Yokomon and a son with a Tsunomon.
Sora Takenouchi (武之内 空, Takenouchi Sora)
Voiced by: Yūko Mizutani (Adventure/02), Suzuko Mimori (tri./DA:LEK), Ryoko Shiraishi (2020 reboot) (Japanese); Colleen O'Shaughnessey (Adventure/02), Wendee Lee (one line in "Invasion of the Daemon Corps"), Cherami Leigh (2020 reboot) (English)
Sora is Tai's best friend and was on the soccer team with him. She lives with her single mother. Despite being tomboyish, Sora takes caution in the Digital World and serves as the mother figure of the DigiDestined, often acting as a mediator between Tai and Matt. She is partnered with Biyomon and holds the Crest of Love (愛情の紋章, Aijō no monshō).
In Digimon Adventure 02, Sora takes up tennis and flower arranging, learning both from her mother. In the series' epilogue, Sora and Biyomon become fashion designers. Sora has married Matt, and they have two children; a daughter with a Yokomon and a son with a Tsunomon.
Koshiro "Izzy" Izumi (泉 光子郎, Izumi Kōshirō)
Voiced by: Umi Tenjin (Adventure/02), Takahiro Sakurai (adult, 02), Mutsumi Tamura (tri./DA:LEK), Yumiko Kobayashi (2020 reboot) (Japanese); Mona Marshall, Neil Kaplan (adult, 02), Anne Yatco (2020 reboot) (English)
Izzy is a computer expert and honor student and enjoys researching the Internet. His intellectual curiosity is strong, but sometimes, he becomes too absorbed to focus on his surroundings. He politely defers to the rest of the DigiDestined. He is also known to carry around a computerized notebook that he uses as a codex for various types of Digimon they've encountered. He is partnered with Tentomon and holds the Crest of Knowledge (知識の紋章, Chishiki no monshō). When he initially found out that he was adopted, he began to subconsciously distance himself from his foster parents, focusing more on his computer and grades instead. He learned the man he called "father" was cousins with his birth father. During Myotismon's invasion of Japan, both his foster parents revealed the truth, and all three of them later came to accept each other as family.
In Digimon Adventure 02, Izzy continues to aid the new generation of DigiDestined by using his computer expertise to monitor the Digital World and alert them about any problems. In Digimon Adventure tri., Izzy works at a new company in the IT business with the base office of operations, creating a program for their partners to travel back and forth between every monitor and the outside world. In the series' epilogue, Izzy researches gateways to the Real and Digital Worlds with Sora's father and Joe's brother, Shu. He has a daughter with a Motimon.
Mimi Tachikawa (太刀川 ミミ, Tachikawa Mimi)
Voiced by: Ai Maeda (Adventure/02), Hitomi Yoshida (tri./DA:LEK), Marika Kōno (2020 reboot) (Japanese); Philece Sampler (Adventure/02/tri.), Wendee Lee ("Princess Karaoke" singing), Kate Higgins (DA:LEK), Suzie Yeung (2020 reboot), Elsie Lovelock (Uncut movie re-dubs) (English)
Mimi is the belle of the DigiDestined. She is the popular and privileged girl in Izzy's class who has lived a sheltered life under wealthy parents. (Note: The English version made an error where Mimi says she has a baby brother when she has no siblings.) She tends to push responsibility onto others when things are difficult for her, but people, and even some Digimon, can't help but be charmed by her straightforward personality. She is known to be high maintenance and abhors fighting, verbal or physical, but at times, she can be caring and nurturing. She is partnered with Palmon and holds the Crest of Sincerity (純真の紋章, Junshin no monshō).
In Digimon Adventure 02, Mimi moves to New York City, but she manages to make her way to the Digital World on occasion. In Digimon Adventure tri., Mimi moves back to Japan and enrolls in Tai's high school.
In the series' epilogue, she and Palmon have become celebrity chefs and have a cooking show. She also has a son who is partnered with a Tanemon.
In a series of online polls conducted on the Digimon website, Mimi was ranked 6th by Japanese voters as Favorite DigiDestined. When the same question was asked three more times, her rank rose to 3rd, fell to 9th, and failed to chart on the final poll. Mimi is ranked first as the DigiDestined whom voters related to the most.
Joe Kido (城戸 丈, Kido Jō)
Voiced by: Masami Kikuchi (Adventure/02), Junya Ikeda (tri./DA:LEK), Takeshi Kusao (2020 reboot) (Japanese); Michael Lindsay (Adventure/02), Robbie Daymond (tri./DA:LEK), Daman Mills (2020 reboot), Eli Farmer (Uncut movie re-dubs) (English)
Joe is an honor student and comes from a family of high-ranked professionals. He spends time studying to enter a high-ranked university and become a physician. Most people see him as just some nerd, however, he is known to be the one others can rely upon. Because he is the oldest of the DigiDestined, he feels responsible for their safety, but his indecisiveness means the group looks to others when making choices. He is partnered with Gomamon and holds the Crest of Reliability (誠実の紋章, Seijitsu no monshō).
In Digimon Adventure 02, Joe is still studying to be a doctor and passes his responsibilities to Cody Hida. In the series' epilogue, Joe has become the Digital World's first doctor. He has a son, who has a Bukamon.
In Digimon Adventure tri., Joe is reluctant to rejoin the DigiDestined, prioritizing his studies over fighting, but eventually finds the resolve to continue fighting.
Takeru "T.K." Takaishi (高石 タケル, Takaishi Takeru)
Voiced by: Hiroko Konishi (Adventure), Taisuke Yamamoto (02), Hiroaki Hirata (adult, 02), Megumi Han (Adventure 2020 reboot), Junya Enoki (tri./DA:LEK/02:TB) (Japanese); Wendee Lee (Adventure), Doug Erholtz (02), Tom Wyner (adult, 02), Johnny Yong Bosch (tri./DA:LEK/02:TB), Corina Boettger (2020 reboot) (English)
T.K. is Matt's younger brother. Unlike the others, he lives in Setagaya with his mother due to their parents' divorce, and despite this, T.K. avoids talking about it. T.K. idolizes Matt and wants to impress him, but he opens up to the other DigiDestined and follows their lead without complaints, particularly Tai. He is partnered with Patamon, holds the Crest of Hope (希望の紋章, Kibō no monshō).
In Digimon Adventure 02, T.K. and his mother move to Odaiba, where Cody and Yolei are his neighbors. He has grown taller and is the ace of the basketball club. He is gentle and friendly, so he is popular with girls, but he seems not to have much interest. Joining the new DigiDestined, T.K. obtains the Digi-Egg of Hope (希望のデジメンタル, Kibō no dejimentaru). In the series' epilogue, T.K. has become a novelist, having written books about his and the other DigiDestined's adventures in the Digital World. He has a son with a Tokomon. In a series of online polls conducted on the Digimon website, T.K. was ranked 7th by Japanese voters as Favorite DigiDestined. When the same question was asked two more times, his rank rose to 2nd, but fell to 3rd. T.K. is also ranked 1st as whom the voters would want as a younger brother and as the DigiDestined whom the voters thought was the strongest. He placed 2nd as the DigiDestined voters would want to switch places with and as the best-looking DigiDestined in the winter. When voters were asked which DigiDestined they would want as their boyfriend, T.K. placed in 3rd.
Kari Kamiya (八神 ヒカリ, Yagami Hikari)
Voiced by: Kae Araki (Adventure/02), M.A.O (tri./DA:LEK/02:TB), Misaki Watada (2020 reboot) (Japanese); Lara Jill Miller (Adventure/02), Tara Sands (tri./DA:LEK/02:TB), Ryan Bartley (2020 reboot) (English)
Kari is Tai's younger sister, a gentle, compassionate girl who puts others before herself. She was unable to come to camp due to a cold, but was eventually revealed to be the eighth DigiDestined child. Kari admires Tai and is considered T.K.'s equal. She is highly perceptive of her environment and Digimon, but this also leaves her vulnerable to the Dark Ocean and being possessed by Homeostasis. She is partnered with Gatomon and holds the Crest of Light (光の紋章, Hikari no monshō).
In Digimon Adventure 02, Kari has grown to be a charming, energetic, and bright girl. The gentleness and the sense of responsibility remain the same as in the past, but sometimes could be "mischievous" and "playful". She becomes pretty interested in photography and she always carries a digital camera. Joining the new DigiDestined, with Davis having a one-sided crush on her, Kari obtains the Digi-Egg of Light (光のデジメンタル, Hikari no dejimentaru). In the series' epilogue, Kari becomes a kindergarten teacher with a son who has inherited her whistle and has a Salamon as his partner Digimon. Originally, Kari was not planned to appear, but halfway into Digimon Adventure's broadcast, Nishizono decided to add her as a character, having been influenced by how "cute" she looked in the 1999 film. In a series of online polls conducted on the Digimon website, Kari was ranked 4th by Japanese voters as their favorite DigiDestined. When the same question was asked two more times, her rank fell to 5th, and then 6th, but finally landed at 1st. In addition, Kari is ranked as 1st, whom the voters would want as a younger sister and as the best-looking DigiDestined in the spring. She placed in 3rd as the DigiDestined whom the voters thought was the strongest and as the best-looking DigiDestined in the winter.

==== Partner Digimon ====
This page only includes the forms shown in the anime. Many of these characters gained alternate digivolutions in spin off media.

Agumon (アグモン)
Voiced by: Chika Sakamoto (Japanese); MJ Lallo (Koromon, "And so it begins..."), Michael Lindsay (Agumon, "And so it begins..."/Greymon), Tom Fahn (Agumon), Doug Erholtz (SkullGreymon/Koromon, tri.), Philece Sampler (Koromon, "The Arrival of Skullgreymon"), Brianne Siddall (Koromon/Botamon, "The Fate of Two Worlds"), Joseph Pilato (MetalGreymon), Lex Lang (WarGreymon), Peggy O'Neal (Botamon, Adventure Movie), Michael Sorich (Big Agumon, Adventure Movie), Bob Papenbrook (Red Greymon, Adventure Movie – Original dub), Kyle Hebert (Greymon/MetalGreymon/WarGreymon, tri.), Benjamin Diskin (2020 reboot), Bryce Papenbrook (Red Greymon, Adventure Movie – Uncut re-dub) (English)
Agumon is a short three-fingered Tyrannosauroidea-like Digimon who is Tai's partner. He is laid-back and simple-minded. Agumon always believes Tai has the best interests for the team and trusts him as a friend. His main attacks are flame-based.
- Botamon (ボタモン) is Agumon's Baby form, a botamochi-like Digimon covered in black fur.
- Koromon (コロモン) is Agumon's In-training form, a pink spherical Digimon with floppy ears.
- Greymon (グレイモン, Gureimon) is Agumon's Champion form, a giant Dinosaur Digimon with a rhinoceros beetle-like helmet on his head and a Ceratosaurus-like horn on his nose.
- MetalGreymon (メタルグレイモン, Metarugureimon) is Agumon's Ultimate form, a cyborg Dinosaur Digimon with wings and missile hatches on his chest and a metal claw on his right arm.
  - MetalGreymon Alterous Mode is the upgraded version of MetalGreymon that only appears in the 2020 Adventure series. He is armed with an extra cannon on his right arm.
  - MetalGreymon (Virus) (メタルグレイモン (ウィルス種）, Metarugureimon (Wirusu Shu)) is a corrupted version of MetalGreymon who only appeared in Digimon Adventure 02 when the Digimon Emperor tests his new Dark Spiral on Greymon. The new Digidestined fought the virus MetalGreymon while they convince Davis to understand that he needs to hurt a friend. Veemon then Armor Digivolves to Raidramon and defeats the virus MetalGreymon by destroying the Dark Spiral, freeing Agumon from the Digimon Emperor's control.
- SkullGreymon (スカルグレイモン, Sukarugureimon) is Agumon's alternate Ultimate form, a Virus-type skeleton Dinosaur Digimon. SkullGreymon first appeared in Digimon Adventure, when Tai forces Greymon to Dark Digivolve in order to fight another Greymon by putting himself in harm's way. He appeared again in Digimon Adventure 02, when the Digimon Emperor took control of Greymon with one of his Dark Rings and forced him to take this form.
- WarGreymon (ウォーグレイモン, Wōgureimon) is Agumon's Mega form, a Dragon-Man Digimon with the powerful Dramon Killers equipped on his both arms.
- BlitzGreymon (ブリッツグレイモン, Burittsugureimon) is Agumon's alternate Mega form, a bipedal mechanical red version of WarGreymon armed with plasma cannons. Only appears in the 2020 Adventure series where he fought and defeated MetallifeKuwagamon.
- Agumon (Bond of Bravery) (アグモン -勇気の絆-, Agumon -Yuki no Kizuna-) is Agumon's final form, a Digivolution forged by the bond between Agumon and Tai. This form only appears in Digimon Adventure: Last Evolution Kizuna during the final battle with Eosmon.
Gabumon (ガブモン)
Voiced by: Mayumi Yamaguchi (Japanese); Kirk Thornton, Jeff Nimoy (Revenge of Diaboromon), Dave B. Mitchell (2020 reboot), Christopher Swindle (Digivolved forms, 2020 reboot) (English)
Gabumon is a reptilian Digimon wearing a wolf pelt and Matt's partner. He is shy and very loyal to Matt. While Gabumon reasons with him whenever he falls too far, he still supports and trusts Matt with any decision he makes. His Digivolutions have ice-based attacks.
- Punimon (プニモン) is Gabumon's Baby form, a round slime-like Digimon with three horns on his head.
- Tsunomon (ツノモン) is Gabumon's In-training form, a spherical Digimon with orange fur and a horn on his head.
- Garurumon (ガルルモン) is Gabumon's Champion form, a giant wolf-like Digimon with an incredible agility.
- WereGarurumon (ワーガルルモン, Wāgarurumon) is Gabumon's Ultimate form, a bipedal werewolf-like Digimon with powerful claws.
  - WereGarurumon Sagittarius Mode is the upgraded version form of WereGarurumon that only appears in the 2020 Adventure series. He is armed with four pairs of mechanical blades.
- MetalGarurumon (メタルガルルモン, Metarugarurumon) is Gabumon's Mega form, a cyborg wolf Digimon with built-in weaponry and blade-shaped wings.
- CresGarurumon (クーレスガルルモン, Kūresugarurumon) is Gabumon's alternate Mega form, a humanoid golden werewolf who wields a blade. This form only appears in the 2020 Adventure series.
- Gabumon (Bond of Friendship) (ガブモン -友情の絆-, Gabumon -Yujo no Kizuna-) is Gabumon's final form, a Digivolution forged by the bond between Gabumon and Matt. This form only appears in Digimon Adventure: Last Evolution Kizuna.
Biyomon (ピヨモン, Piyomon)
Voiced by: Atori Shigematsu (Japanese); Tifanie Christun, Cherami Leigh (tri./DA:LEK/Our War Game redub), Melodee Spevack (Birdramon, Garudamon), Mona Marshall (Birdramon, Garudamon, Phoenixmon) (tri. Parts 4-6), Tara Sands (2020 reboot) (English)
Biyomon is a small bird-like Digimon who is Sora's partner. She is expressive about her feelings and is affectionate towards Sora. She helps Sora open up to her mother and mends their relationship. Biyomon and her Digivolution's attacks are flame-based.
- Nyokimon (ニョキモン) is Biyomon's Baby form, a black seed Digimon with a sprout on her head.
- Yokomon (ピョコモン, Pyokomon) is Biyomon's In-training form, who resembles an onion bulb with root-like tentacles and a flower on her head.
- Birdramon (バードラモン, Bādoramon) is Biyomon's Champion form, a Phoenix-like Digimon enveloped with blazing flames.
- Garudamon (ガルダモン) is Biyomon's Ultimate form, a Garuda-themed Digimon with large talons and wings.
- Phoenixmon (ホウオウモン, Hououmon) is Biyomon's Mega form, a holy four-winged Houou-themed bird Digimon.
Tentomon (テントモン)
Voiced by: Takahiro Sakurai (Japanese); Jeff Nimoy, R. Martin Klein ("Invasion of the Daemon Corps", "BlackWarGreymon's Destiny" and "A Million Points of Light"), Joshua Seth (Tentomon, "And so it begins"/Motimon/Pabumon), Christopher Swindle (2020 reboot) (English)
Tentomon is a insectoid ladybug Digimon and Izzy's partner. He speaks in a Kansai dialect. He has the ability to digivolve into insect-type forms with electric-based attacks. He is highly intelligent, curious, and polite. Although he admires and is fascinated by Izzy's curiosity, he cannot understand it and is baffled by Izzy preferring his laptop over socializing with his friends. Tentomon occasionally becomes annoyed when Izzy becomes sidetracked by his curiosity.
- Pabumon (バブモン, Babumon) is Tentomon's Baby form, a blob-like Digimon with a pacifier.
- Motimon (モチモン, Mochimon) is Tentomon's In-training form, a cylinder-shaped blob Digimon based on mochi rice cakes.
- Kabuterimon (カブテリモン) is Tentomon's Champion form, a giant four-armed Japanese rhinoceros beetle-themed Digimon.
- MegaKabuterimon (アトラーカブテリモン, Atorākabuterimon) is Tentomon's Ultimate form, a giant four-armed Japanese rhinoceros beetle-themed Digimon that flies through the ignition at its rear end.
- HerculesKabuterimon (ヘラクルカブテリモン, Herakurukabuterimon) is Tentomon's Mega form, a gigantic golden Atlas beetle-themed Digimon armed with enormous horn and scissors.
Palmon (パルモン, Parumon)
Voiced by: Kinoko Yamada (Japanese); Anna Garduno (Tanemon/Palmon), Mari Devon (Togemon), Dorothy Elias-Fahn (Lillymon/Rosemon/Palmon, "A Million Points of Light"), Corina Boettger (2020 reboot), Alejandro Saab (2020 reboot, Ponchomon) (English)
Palmon is a mandrake-themed Digimon with a tail who often sees the good in Mimi and often tries to make her partner appreciate what she has. When Mimi first leaves the Digital World, Palmon is unable to say goodbye to her. In the series' epilogue, she and Mimi become celebrity chefs and have their own cooking show.
- Yuramon (ユラモン) is Palmon's Baby form, a seed Digimon covered in long hair.
- Tanemon (タネモン) is Palmon's In-training form, a bulb Digimon with two leaves sprouting from her head.
- Togemon (トゲモン) is Palmon's Champion form, a humanoid cactus-themed Digimon who wears boxing gloves. Togemon can fire the needles of her body at a great speed.
- Ponchomon (ポンチョモン) is Palmon's alternate Champion form that appears exclusively in the 2020 Adventure series, a poncho-wearing cactus/ghost-themed that wears a sombrero and carries maracas. She becomes this form to defeat Etemon and Volcamon in a musical match.
- Lillymon (リリモン, Ririmon) is Palmon's Ultimate form, a flower fairy-themed Digimon with four leaf-like wings. She can combine the flowers in her hands to form a big cannon.
- Rosemon (ロゼモン, Rozemon) is Palmon's Mega form, an alluring rose/fairy-themed Digimon armed with a whip as her weapon of choice.
Gomamon (ゴマモン)
Voiced by: Junko Takeuchi (Japanese); R. Martin Klein, Michael Sorich (Zudomon, Vikemon), Alex Cazares (2020 reboot) (English)
Gomamon is a sea lion/sea otter-themed Digimon and Joe's partner. He has the ability to digivolve into seal-type forms with water-based attacks. Gomamon has a laid-back and easygoing personality, where he often attempts to convince Joe to overcome his fears and socialize instead of studying.
- Pichimon (ピチモン) is Gomamon's Baby form, a small Hyperia macrocephala-themed Digimon.
- Bukamon (プカモン, Pukamon) is Gomamon's In-training form, a baby aquatic dinosaur-themed Digimon.
- Ikkakumon (イッカクモン) is Gomamon's Champion form, a walrus/polar bear-themed Digimon that can use his one horn as a missile.
- Zudomon (ズドモン) is Gomamon's Ultimate form, a bipedal walrus-themed Digimon that wears a turtle shell strapped to its back. He uses spark-based attacks with his Thor Hammer.
- Vikemon (ヴァイクモン, Vaikumon) is Gomamon's Mega form, a walrus/Viking/arctic fox-themed Beast Man Digimon. He uses ice-based attacks with the morning star Mjölnir that carries on his back.
Patamon (パタモン)
Voiced by: Miwa Matsumoto (Japanese); Laura Summer, Bridget Hoffman (Revenge of Diaboromon), Dave Mallow (Angemon/MagnaAngemon/Seraphimon/Pegasusmon), Jamieson Price (Angemon/MagnaAngemon/Seraphimon, tri. Confession through Future), Lizzie Freeman (Patamon/Pegasusmon, 2020 reboot), Chris Hackney (Angemon/MagnaAngemon/Goldramon/Seraphimon, 2020 reboot), Bradley Gareth (Angemon/Seraphimon, Movie 3 uncut re-dub) (English)
Patamon is a pudgy guinea pig-like Digimon with bat wing ears and T.K.'s partner. Due to T.K.'s young age in Adventure, initially he is the last to digivolve into higher forms. In Adventure, he sacrifices himself to defeat Devimon, recomposing into a Digi-Egg afterwards. Because of this, T.K. is sometimes reluctant to let him fight.
- Poyomon (ポヨモン) is Patamon's Baby form, a blob Digimon with traslucent body.
- Tokomon (トコモン) is Patamon's In-training form, a sharp-toothed Digimon with tiny limbs and two rows of sharp teeth.
- Pegasusmon (ペガスモン, Pegasumon), is Patamon's Armor form when he uses the Digi-Egg of Hope to Digivolve, a Pegasus-themed Holy Beast Digimon. In the 2020 series, Patamon can Digivolve to Pegasus without the Digi-Egg of Hope.
- Angemon (エンジェモン, Enjemon) is Patamon's Champion form, a muscular angel-themed Digimon with six wings and holy powers. Angemon wears a mask on his face with the Christian cross.
- Manbomon (マンボモン, Manbomon) is a boxing glove-wearing ocean sunfish-themed Patamon's Armor form when T.K. used Kari's Digi-Egg of Hope to Digivolve in Digimon Adventure 02 Drama CD: Armor Evolution to the Unknown. This was because Joe mixed up the D-Terminals.
- MagnaAngemon (ホーリーエンジェモン, Hōrīenjemon) is Patamon's Ultimate form, an archangel-themed Digimon with eight wings, a beam shield on its left shoulder, a laser sword on its right wrist, and holy ribbons around his body.
- Shakkoumon (シャッコウモン) is Patamon's alternate Ultimate form, the DNA Digivolution between Ankylomon and Angemon. Shakkoumon is a Dogū-based Digimon who combines Ankylomon's armor with Angemon's holy powers.
- Seraphimon (セラフィモン, Serafimon) is Patamon's Mega form, a seraph-themed Digimon with ten wings dressed in a holy armor, who wears a star-shaped mask that hides his face.
- Goldramon (ゴッドドラモン, Goddodoramon) is Patamon's alternate Mega form, a Holy Dragon Digimon that resembles a golden Eastern dragon with six wings and a muscular torso. This form only appears in the 2020 Adventure series.
Gatomon (テイルモン, Teirumon)
Voiced by: Yuka Tokumitsu, Mie Sonozaki (2020 reboot) (Japanese); Edie Mirman, Kate Higgins (tri., DA:LEK, 02:TB), Erin Yvette (2020 reboot/Angewomon, 02:TB) (English)

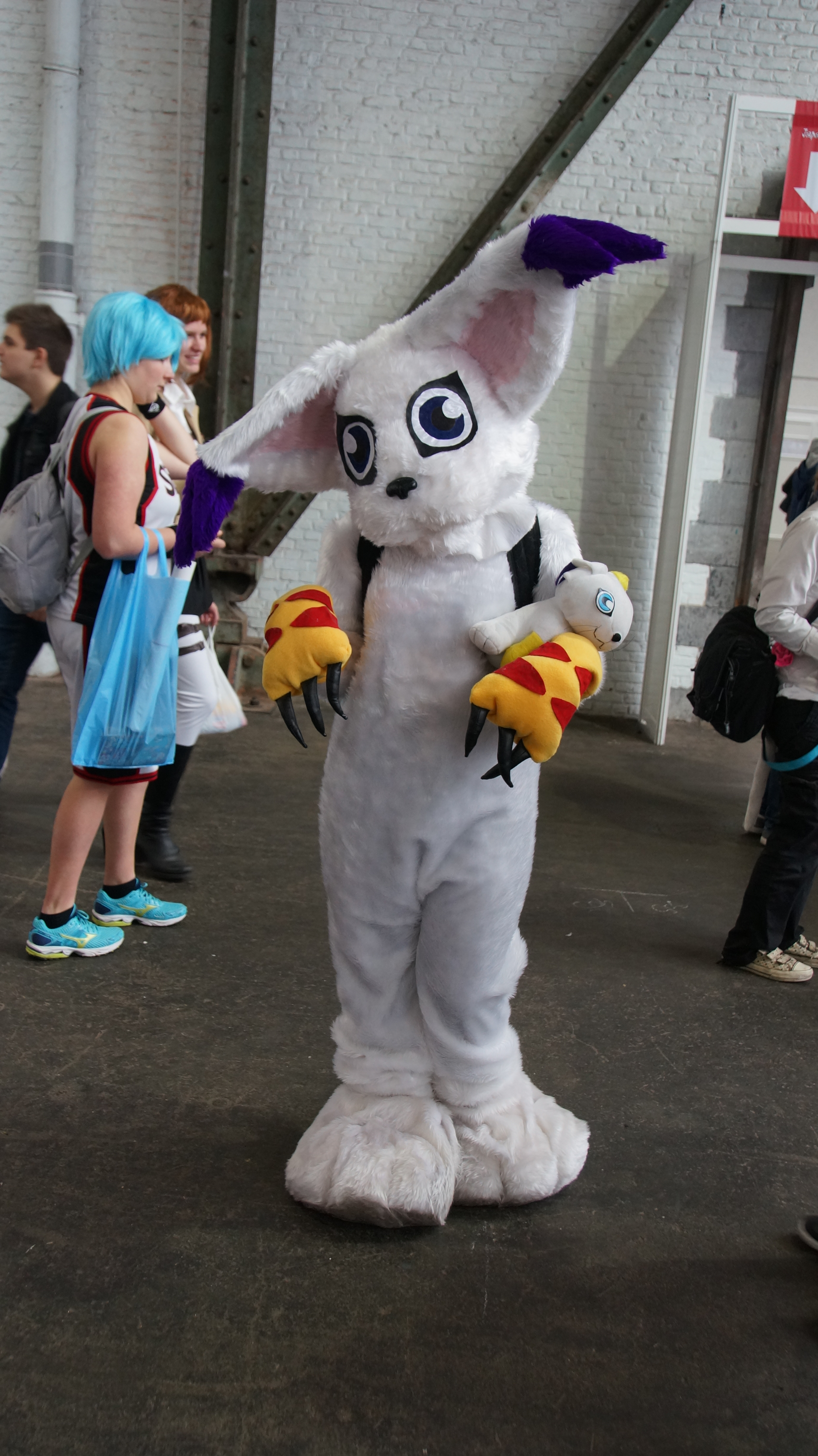
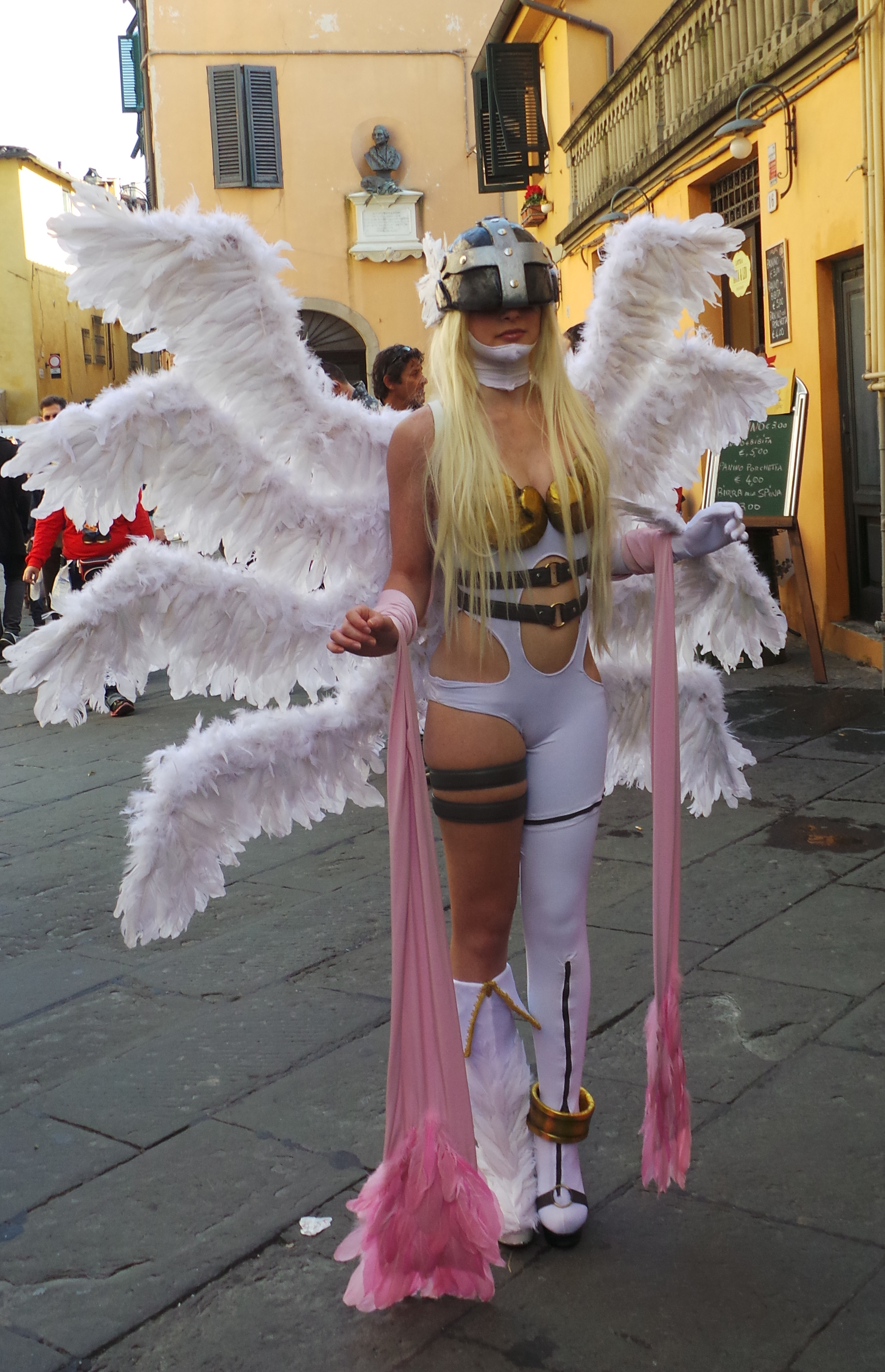
Cosplayers dressed as Gatomon (left) and Angewomon (right)

Gatomon is an exalted beast Digimon in the form of a bipedal cat and Kari's partner, wearing a special ring on her tail that gives her extra strength and prevents dark energy from spreading. Unlike the others, she is a Champion-level Digimon and displays a more mature behavior due to her complicated past. In both versions of the series, Gatomon is initially introduced as an antagonist who joins the DigiDestined upon being reunited with her partner. Due to Gennai losing her Digi-Egg while evading the Dark Masters, Gatomon ends up in the forced employ of Myotismon with Wizardmon as her only companion before he convinced her to defect to the DigDestined upon helping her realize she is Kari's partner. In Digimon Adventure 02, Gatomon loses her ring after being attacked by a Dark Ring-controlled Unimon, but retrieves it from Gennai at the end of the series.
- Nyaromon (ニャロモン) is Gatomon's Baby form, a tiny Digimon that resembles a cat head with a tail.
- Salamon (プロットモン, Purottomon) is Gatomon's rookie form, a Plott Hound-themed Digimon with holy powers, although is unable to manifest them.
- Nefertimon (ネフェルティモン, Neferutimon) is Gatomon's Armor form when she uses the Digi-Egg of Light to Digivolve, a winged sphinx-like Holy Beast Digimon named after the Ancient Egyptian queen Nefertiti.
- Butterflymon (バタフラモン, Batafuramon) is a butterfly-themed Digimon and Gatomon's Armor form when Kari used the Digi-Egg of Hope in Digimon Adventure 02 Drama CD: Armor Evolution to the Unknown. This was because Joe mixed up the D-Terminals.
- Angewomon (エンジェウーモン, Enjeūmon) is Gatomon's Ultimate form, an angel-themed Digimon with the appearance of a beautiful woman. She has a longstanding rivalry with her dark counterpart, LadyDevimon.
- Silphymon (シルフィーモン, Shirufīmon) is Gatomon's alternate Ultimate form, the DNA Digivolution between Aquilamon and Gatomon. Silphymon is a sylphid-themed Beast Man Digimon. It has Gatomon's ears and Aquilamon's legs, tail feathers, and wing feathers.
- Magnadramon (ホーリードラモン, Hōrīdoramon) is Gatomon's Mega form, a God Dragon Digimon that resembles a pink Eastern dragon with a leonine face and ten wings.
- Ophanimon: Falldown Mode (オファニモン：フォールダウンモード, Ofanimon: Fōrudaun Mōdo) is an ophanim-themed Digimon who is the corrupted version of Ophanimon. In Digimon Adventure tri. when Kari believes Tai had died in Coexistence, her overwhelmingly negative emotions force Nyaromon to warp digivolve into this form, before fusing with Raguelmon to become Ordinemon.
Omnimon (オメガモン, Omegamon)
Voiced by: Chika Sakamto & Mayumi Yamaguchi (Japanese); Lex Lang & Kirk Thornton (Our War Game!), Lex Lang & Jeff Nimoy (Revenge of Diaboromon), Kyle Hebert & Kirk Thornton (tri./DA:LEK), Michael Sorich & Kirk Thornton (tri. Part 6), Benjamin Diskin & Christopher Swindle (2020 reboot) (English):
A Holy Knight Digimon that is the DNA Digivolved state of WarGreymon and MetalGarurumon, holding the "Garuru Cannon" on his MetalGarurumon-like right hand while his left WarGreymon-like hand conceals the "Grey Sword", while his left arm also has the "Brave Shield Omega". Omnimon first appeared in Digimon Adventure: Our War Game! to battle Diaboromon, thanks to the power given from all who were watching their fight through the Internet.
- Omnimon: Merciful Mode (オメガモン：マーシフルモード, Omegamon Māshifuru Mōdo) is a Mode Change of Omnimon, who first appeared in Digimon Adventure tri. Future when all the Digidestined' Partner Digimon power up Omnimon in order to destroy Ordinemon.
- Omnimon Alter-S is Omnimon's alternate form exclusively in the 2020 Adventure series during his battle with Abbadomon Core, the WarGreymon and MetalGarurumon arms turned into BlitzGreymon and CresGarurumon arms.

=== Adventure 02 protagonists ===
Davis Motomiya (本宮 大輔, Motomiya Daisuke)
Voiced by: Reiko Kiuchi (Adventure 02), Fukujūrō Katayama (DA:LEK/02:TB) (Japanese); Brian Donovan, Griffin Burns (DA:LEK) (English)
Davis is the main protagonist of story and the leader of the new DigiDestined, wearing Tai's goggles after losing his own during battle. He has a one-sided crush on Kari and is jealous of her friendship with T.K. Though impulsive, rebellious, and simple-minded, Davis values his friends and is strongly dedicated to protecting them. He holds the Digi-Egg of Courage (勇気のデジメンタル, Yūki no Dejimentaru; Digimental of Courage) and the Digi-Egg of Friendship (友情のデジメンタル, Yūjō no Dejimentaru; Digimental of Friendship), briefly obtaining the Digi-Egg of Miracles (奇跡のデジメンタル, Kiseki no Dejimentaru; Digimental of Miracles).
In the series' epilogue, He has opened a noodle cart, which eventually expands into a food franchise. He has a son who has inherited Tai's goggles, making him the epilogue DigiDestined's leader. His son has a DemiVeemon as his partner Digimon.
Yolei Inoue (井ノ上 京, Inoue Miyako)
Voiced by: Rio Natsuki (Adventure 02), Ayaka Asai (DA:LEK/02:TB) (Japanese); Tifanie Christun, Bridget Hoffman ("Invasion of the Daemon Corps"), Jeannie Tirado (DA:LEK/02:TB), Jessica Peterson (Movie 3 Uncut re-dub) (English)
Yolei is the president of the Computer Club at Odaiba Elementary School. She lives in the same apartment building as T.K. and Cody, where her family runs a convenience store on the first floor. Her proficiency with computers and technical knowledge makes her resourceful to the team, but she can also be impulsive and idealistic. She holds the Digi-Egg of Love (愛情のデジメンタル, Aijō no Dejimentaru; Digimental of Love) and the Digi-Egg of Sincerity (純真のデジメンタル, Junshin no Dejimentaru; Digimental of Sincerity).
In the epilogue, Yolei becomes a housewife after she marries Ken, they have three children; the oldest a daughter with a Poromon and two sons, the older with a Minomon and a baby with a Leafmon.
Yolei appears in the game Digimon Digital Card Battle, where her name listed as "Keely".
Cody Hida (火田 伊織, Hida Iori)
Voiced by: Megumi Urawa (Adventure 02), Yoshitaka Yamaya (DA:LEK/02:TB) (Japanese); Philece Sampler, Bryce Papenbrook (DA:LEK/02:TB), Madeline Dorroh (Movie 3 Uncut re-dub) (English)
Cody is the youngest member of the new DigiDestined living with his paternal grandfather and kendo master, who serves as a father figure in place of his deceased father Hiroki. He holds the Digi-Egg of Knowledge (知識のデジメンタル, Chishiki no Dejimentaru; Digimental of Knowledge) and the Digi-Egg of Reliability (誠実のデジメンタル, Seijitsu no Dejimentaru; Digimental of Reliability).
Near the end of the series, Cody learns that his father was Yukio Oikawa's best friend. In the series' epilogue, Cody becomes a lawyer and has a daughter with Upamon as her partner Digimon.
Ken Ichijoji (一乗寺 賢, Ichijōji Ken)
Voiced by: Romi Park (Adventure 02), Arthur Lounsbery (DA:LEK/02:TB) (Japanese); Derek Stephen Prince (English)
Ken is a prodigy from Tamachi who entered the Digital World as a child and traveled with Ryo Akiyama until he was implanted by a Dark Spore, a fragment of a Digimon named Milleniummon that they defeated. Following the death of his older brother SamOikawa's manipulation, Ken is influenced by the Dark Spore into emulating his brother while becoming the Digimon Emperor (デジモンカイザー, Dejimon Kaizā; Digimon Kaiser), who attempts to take over the digital world, under the belief that it's a game. After his defeat, Ken returns to his normal appearance and later joins DigiDestined to stop Oikawa's group. In the series' epilogue, Ken becomes a detective and is married to Yolei with three children; the firstborn daughter with a Poromon and two sons, the older with a Minomon and a baby with a Leafmon.

==== Adventure 02 Partner Digimon ====
This page only includes the forms shown in the anime. Many of these characters gained alternate digivolutions in spin off media.

Veemon (ブイモン, Buimon)
Voiced by: Junko Noda (Japanese); Derek Stephen Prince, Steve Blum (Flamedramon, Raidramon, Magnamon), Dina Sherman (Chibomon) (English)
Veemon is a small blue dragon Digimon and Davis' partner. Veemon, along with Hawkmon and Armadillomon, are the three Digimon of ancient times who were sealed away by Azulongmon, to be awakened again in a time of crisis. He is lighthearted and very brave, always determined to achieve his and Davis' goals. Veemon has a crush on Gatomon.
- Chibomon (チコモン, Chikomon) is Veemon's Baby form, a tiny round dragon-like Digimon.
- DemiVeemon (チビモン, Chibimon) is Veemon's In-training form, a bipedal but small dragon-like Digimon. Veemon takes this form whenever he returns to the Real World with Davis.
- Flamedramon (フレイドラモン, Fureidoramon) is Veemon's Armor form when he uses the Digi-Egg of Courage to Digivolve, a bipedal fire dragon-themed Digimon with flame-based attacks whose armor heavily resembles the Digi-Egg of Courage.
- Raidramon (ライドラモン, Raidoramon) is Veemon's Armor form when he uses the Digi-Egg of Friendship to Digivolve, a quadrupedal thunder dragon-themned Digimon with thunder-based attacks whose armor heavily resembles the Digi-Egg of Friendship.
- Sagittarimon (サジタリモン, Sajitarimon) is a bow and arrow-wielding dragon/centaur-themed Digimon and Veemon's Armor form when Davis used T.K.'S Digi-Egg of Hope to Digivolve in Digimomn Adventure 02 Drama CD: Armor Evolution to the Unknown. This happened when Joe caused a mix-up to the D-Terminals.
- Magnamon (マグナモン, Magunamon) is Veemon's Armor form when he uses the Digi-Egg of Miracles to Digivolve, a gold-armored dragon-themed Holy Knight Digimon with Mega-level powers whose armor heavily resembles the Digi-Egg of Miracles.
- ExVeemon (エクスブイモン, Ekusubuimon) is Veemon's Champion form, a humanoid dragon-themed Digimon with a horn on his nose, an X on its chest, and white wings.
- Paildramon (パイルドラモン, Pairudoramon) is Veemon's Ultimate form, the DNA Digivolution between ExVeemon and Stingmon, combining features from Dragon and Insect-type Digimon. Paildramon uses his Desperado Blaster to fight with his enemies.
- Imperialdramon: Dragon Mode (インペリアルドラモン：ドラゴンモード, Inperiarudoramon: Doragon Mōdo) is Veemon's Mega form, Digivolved from Paildramon. Imperialdramon is a large quadrupedal dragon Digimon with a pair of wings and a Positron Laser on his back. This form served as a mode of transportation starting in the "Digimon World Tour" episodes.
  - Imperialdramon: Fighter Mode (インペリアルドラモン：ファイターモード, Inperiarudoramon: Faitā Mōdo) is a Mode Change of Imperialdramon: Dragon Mode, resembling a humanoid version of his previous form. The Positron Laser is now on his right arm.
    - Imperialdramon: Paladin Mode (インペリアルドラモン：パラディンモード, Inperiarudoramon Paradin Mōdo) is a Mode Change of Imperialdramon: Fighter Mode, resembling a Paladin version of his previous form. Imperialdramon: Paladin Mode first appeared in Digimon Adventure 02: Revenge of Diaboromon, when Omnimon gives all his powers to him in order to destroy Armageddemon.
Hawkmon (ホークモン, Hōkumon)
Voiced by: Kōichi Tōchika (Japanese); Neil Kaplan, Steve Blum (Pururumon/Poromon), Jeff Nimoy (Revenge of Diaboromon), Christopher Swindle (DA:LEK) (English)
Hawkmon is a bald eagle-themed Digimon and Yolei's partner. He is very polite and gentlemanly; in the Japanese original, this makes him come off like a samurai, while in the English dub he sounds more like a British gentleman. Compared to Yolei, he is down-to-earth and helps her stay grounded.
- Pururumon (プルルモン) is Hawkmon's Baby form, it resembles a hatchling.
- Poromon (ポロモン) is Hawkmon's In-training form, a spherical chick Digimon that can fly at low heights. Hawkmon takes this form whenever he returns to the Real World with Yolei.
- Halsemon (ホルスモン, Horusumon) is Hawkmon's Armor form when he uses the Digi-Egg of Love to Digivolve, a griffin-themed Digimon wearing a helmet that heavily resembles the Digi-Egg of Love. He is named after the Egyptian god Horus and uses wind-based attacks.
- Shurimon (シュリモン) is Hawkmon's Armor form when he uses the Digi-Egg of Sincerity to Digivolve, a ninja/shuriken-themed Digimon whose design heavily resembles the Digi-Egg of Sincerity.
- Rinkmon (リンクモン) is an ice skater-themed Digimon and Hawkmon's Armor form when Yolei used Davis' Digi-Egg of Friendship to Digivolve in Digimon Adventure 02 Drama CD: Armor Evolution to the Unknown. This was because Joe mixed up the D-Terminals.
- Aquilamon (アクィラモン, Akwiramon) is Hawkmon's Champion form, a giant eagle Digimon with two cattle-like-like horns.
- Silphymon (シルフィーモン, Shirufīmon) is Hawkmon's Ultimate form, the DNA Digivolution between Aquilamon and Gatomon. Silphymon is a Beast Man Digimon based on the mythical sylphid. They have Gatomon's ears and Aquilamon's legs, tailfeathers, and wingfeathers.
Armadillomon (アルマジモン, Arumajimon)
Voiced by: Megumi Urawa (Japanese); Robert Axelrod, Dave Mallow (Tsubumon/Upamon), Tom Fahn (Digmon/Submarimon), Robbie Daymond (DA:LEK/02:TB), Wayne Grayson (Movie 3 Uncut re-dub) (English)
Armadillomon is an armadillo Digimon and Cody's partner. He has a laid-back personality and speaks with a Nagoya dialect, usually ending his sentences with "da gya". In the English dub, he speaks with a Southern U.S. accent. His easy going nature is a sharp contrast to Cody's serious personality.
- Tsubumon (ツブモン) is Armadillomon's Baby form, a spherical seed-like Digimon with a tail over his head.
- Upamon (ウパモン) is Armadillomon's In-training form, a round axolotl-like Digimon. Armadillomon takes this form whenever he returns to the Real World with Cody.
- Digmon (ディグモン, Digumon) is Armadillomon's Armor form when he uses the Digi-Egg of Knowledge to Digivolve, a mole cricket-like Digimon armed with drills on his mouth and hands, whose design heavily resembles the Digi-Egg of Knowledge.
- Submarimon (サブマリモン, Sabumarimon) is Armadillomon's Armor form when he uses the Digi-Egg of Reliability to Digivolve, a submarine-themed Digimon whose design heavily resembles the Digi-Egg of Reliability.
- Pteramon (プテラノモン, Puteranomon) is a Pteranodon/fighter aircraft-themed Digimon and Armadillomon's Armor form when Cody used Yolei's Digi-Egg of Love in Digimon Adventure 02 Drama CD: Armor Evolution to the Unknown. This was because Joe mixed up the D-Terminals.
- Ankylomon (アンキロモン, Ankiromon) is Armadillomon's Champion form, an Ankylosaurus-like Digimon with an iron spiked ball mace on the end of its tail.
- Shakkoumon (シャッコウモン) is Armadillomon's Ultimate form, the DNA Digivolution between Ankylomon and Angemon. Shakkoumon is a dogū-based Digimon who combines Ankylomon's armor with Angemon's holy powers.
Wormmon (ワームモン, Wāmumon)
Voiced by: Naozumi Takahashi (Japanese); Paul St. Peter, Wendee Lee (Leafmon/Minomon), Christopher Swindle (02:TB) (English)
Wormmon is a caterpillar Digimon and Ken's partner. He possesses the ability to crawl and generates silk from his mouth. When Ken becomes the Digimon Emperor, Wormmon stays by his side hoping that he will return to his normal self. Realizing Ken has lost sight of himself, Wormmon sacrifices himself to allow Magnamon to destroy Kimeramon. He is later reincarnated at Primary Village and meets a reformed Ken.
- Leafmon (リーフモン, Rīfumon) is Wormmon's Baby form, a small green Digimon with a long tail resembling a leaf and a pink pacifier on his mouth.
- Minomon (ミノモン) is Wormmon's In-training form, a bagworm moth larva Digimon.
- Stingmon (スティングモン, Sutingumon) is Wormmon's Champion form, an insectoid Digimon with a muscular body structure.
- Bucchiemon (プッチーモン, Putchīmon) is a pixie-themed Digimon and Wormmon's Armor form when he uses the Digi-Egg of Kindness in Digimon Adventure 02 Drama CD: Armor Evolution to the Unknown.
- Paildramon (パイルドラモン, Pairudoramon) is Wormmon's Ultimate form, the DNA Digivolution between ExVeemon and Stingmon, combining features from Dragon and Insect-type Digimon. Paildramon uses his Desperado Blaster to fight with his enemies.
- Imperialdramon: Dragon Mode (インペリアルドラモン：ドラゴンモード, Inperiarudoramon: Doragon Mōdo) is Wormmon's Mega form, Digivolved from Paildramon. Imperialdramon is a draconic quadrupedal Digimon with a pair of wings and the Positron Laser on his back.
  - Imperialdramon: Fighter Mode (インペリアルドラモン：ファイターモード, Inperiarudoramon: Faitā Mōdo) is a Mode Change of Imperialdramon: Dragon Mode, resembling a humanoid version of his previous form. The Positron Laser is now on his right arm.
    - Imperialdramon: Paladin Mode (インペリアルドラモン：パラディンモード, Inperiarudoramon Paradin Mōdo) is a Mode Change of Imperialdramon: Fighter Mode, resembling a Paladin version of his previous form. Imperialdramon: Paladin Mode first appeared in Digimon Adventure 02: Revenge of Diaboromon, when Omnimon gives all his powers to him in order to destroy Armageddemon.

=== Adventure tri. protagonists ===
Meiko Mochizuki (望月 芽心, Mochizuki Meiko)
Voiced by: Miho Arakawa (Japanese); Cristina Valenzuela (English)
Meiko is a DigiDestined from Tottori, who transfers to Tsukishima High School. A shy but gentle teenage girl, Meiko always prefers to run instead of facing the problems. Meiko's presence keeps Meicoomon's feral behavior in check.

==== Partner Digimon ====
Meicoomon (メイクーモン, Meikūmon)
Voiced by: Yukiko Morishita (Japanese); Kate Higgins (English)
Meicoomon is a Maine Coon-themed Champion-level Digimon and Meiko's partner, known by the codename "Libra". Meicoomon contains a shard of Apocalymon's data within her body, which causes an infection in the Digital World. This forces Homeostasis and Hackmon to deem Meicoomon a threat while King Drasil and Dark Gennai see her as a means to destroy humanity. Being separated from Meiko for long periods of time, or seeing her partner harmed, causes her to go feral as Apocalymon's influence manifests itself as she transformed into Meicoomon Saltation (メイクーモン 豹変時, Meikūmon Hyōhen-ji) when she destroyed Leomon. Meicoomon later digivolved into her Ultimate form, Meicrackmon Vicious Mode (メイクラックモンヴィシャスモード, Meikurakkumon Vishasu Mōdo) before being exposed to the Digital World's reboot. But Meicoomon retains her memories of Meiko which Dark Gennai exploits to have her fully embrace Apocalymon's influence.
- Ordinemon (オルディネモン, Orudinemon) is a Mega-level Fallen Angel Digimon born from the forced Dark DNA Digivolution between Raguelmon and Ophanimon: Falldown Mode in Coexistence. A feminine humanoid Digimon with DNA-strand like limbs whose sole purpose is to nullifying existence with the miasma emitted from her wings. Ordinemon's power allows the Real World to begin being swallowed up by the Digital World. According to Hackmon, Ordinemon was reduced to a mindless monster from her inability to control her power, although some connection to her partners remains. Although Jesmon extracts Gatomon from her, Ordinemon is unable to revert to Meicoomon when further corrupted by King Drasil synthesizing viruses into her body, forcing the Digidestined to destroy her and end Meicoomon's suffering.

=== Film protagonists ===
Willis (ウォレス, Woresu)
Voiced by: Nami Miyahara (Japanese); Bob Glouberman (English)
Willis is an American DigiDestined who grew up in Denver and currently lives in New York. He is slightly arrogant and tends to bottle up his feelings, but is clearly a kindhearted person who cares for his friends and Digimon. Willis owns twin partner Digimon: Gummymon and Kokomon. When Kokomon got infected by a virus, he digivolved into the antagonistic Wendigomon.

==== Partner Digimon ====
Terriermon (テリアモン, Teriamon)
Voiced by: Aoi Tada (Japanese); Mona Marshall, Michael Sorich (Gargomon), Lex Lang (Rapidmon) (English)
Terriermon is a one-horned long-eared terrier Digimon who is one of Willis' partners and is Wendigomon's brother. He first appeared as Gummymon during Kokomon's disappearance.
- Gargomon (ガルゴモン, Garugomon): Terriermon's champion form, a galgo Digimon that resembles a larger version of Terriermon wearing pants and a bandolier and whose forearms bear a pair of cybernetic gatling guns that he uses in his attacks, such as the move "Gargo Laser".
- Rapidmon (ラピッドモン, Rapiddomon): Terriermon's Armor form when he uses the Digi-Egg of Destiny to Digivolve. He is a cyborg Digimon resembling an upright poodle clad in heavy cybernetic armor.

== Antagonists ==
=== Adventure antagonists ===
Devimon (デビモン, Debimon)
Voiced by: Kaneto Shiozawa (Japanese); Tom Wyner (English)
Devimon is a Champion-level devil-themed Digimon with long arms and bat wings. He can enslave other Digimon with his "Touch of Evil" claw attack and by embedding them with Black Gears. They are used to control each part of File Island. Devimon lives on top of Infinity Mountain, using Orgemon and a Black Gear-infected Leomon as his enforcers in an initial attempt to kill the DigiDestined, before using the gears to fracture File Island in order to separate the DigiDestined from each other. After the DigiDestined regroup, Devimon absorbs most of the Black Gears into his body so he can increase his size, only to be destroyed by Angemon. In Digimon Adventure 02, Ken finds Devimon's remains and uses his data to complete Kimeramon. In Digimon Adventure tri. Future, a Devimon appears to fight MagnaAngemon.
In the 2020 Adventure series, Devimon is an embodiment of Angemon's darkness that created during the former's imprisonment and became a separate entity seeking to understand digivolution while corrupting Angemon. During the battle with Agumon and Gabumon, MoonMilleniumon digivolves him to NeoDevimon and then to DanDevimon. Before swallowing Tai. While Agumon digivolves to an incomplete Machinedramon to violently attack DanDevimon, Angemon manages to calm him down as he briefly becomes WarGreymon and destroys DanDevimon. But Devimon survived due to his connection to Angemon, possessing a construct of himself created by Sakakkumon before Angemon absorbs him. Devimon accepts his fate to see if Angemon and TK's resolve is strong, supporting the former during the battle with Negamon.
Etemon (エテモン)
Voiced by: Yasunori Masutani (Japanese); Richard Epcar (English)
Etemon is a Ultimate-level puppet Digimon that resembles a sunglasses-wearing monkey. Etemon is a charismatic and egotistical popstar (Elvis impersonator in the English dub) whose signature attack Love Seranade allows him to overwhelm other Digimon with his singing voice. Etemon rules over a portion of the Server Continent with an iron fist and uses the Dark Network to keep tabs on the DigiDestined. The DigiDestined later infiltrate Etemon's pyramid base where the core of the Dark Network is located, freeing Etemon's nemesis Datamon who later causes the Dark Network to absorb everything within reach in a final attempt to destroy Etemon. But Datamon's final gambit only merged Etemon and the Dark Network into Etemon Chaos (エテモンカオス, Etemon Kaosu), who ends up in another dimension when taking an attack from MetalGreymon forms a vortex that also sent Tai and his partner to the Real World. Etemon later returns to the Digital World after absorbing the Dark Network's energies to become the Mega-level cyborg Digimon MetalEtemon (メタルエテモン, Metaruetemon), whose body is coated in ChromeDigizoid metal. MetalEtemon proceeds to hunt down Joe and Mimi after they separated from the others, only to be destroyed by Zudomon and SaberLeomon after fatally wounding the latter.
In the 2020 Adventure series, Etemon has a musical rivalry with Volcamon. He along with Volcamon were defeated by Ponchomon in a musical match.
Myotismon (ヴァンデモン, Vandemon; Vamdemon)
Voiced by: Ryūzaburō Ōtomo, Toshiyuki Morikawa (02) (Japanese); Richard Epcar (English)
Myotismon is an aggressive and evil Ultimate-level vampire-themed Digimon who serves as the DigiDestineds' nemesis, a heartless monster able to create alpha bat constructs in his signature Grisley Wing attack. Myotismon first appears in the series to have DemiDevimon keep the children occupied while establishing an army of Digimon to enter the human world and kill the eighth DigiDestined, via having his forces scout Tokyo. After learning Gatomon is the eighth DigiDestined's partner, he creates a fog barrier around Odaiba to personally take over the district before a captured Kari is brought before him. The battle that ensued results in Myotismon being physically destroyed by Angewomon, only for his bats to reconstitute him as the nearly mindless Mega-level Beast of Revelation-themed Digimon VenomMyotismon (ヴェノムヴァンデモン, VenomuVandemon; VenomVamdemon). Though destroyed after Tai and Matt acquired the ability to digivolve their partners to Mega-level, Myotismon's soul survives and tricks Yukio Oikawa into being his host by playing on the human's desires.
After a few years of directing Oikawa into executing his plan to ensure his return to power, Myotismon reveals himself in the World of Dreams. He absorbs the bloomed Dark Flowers Oikawa cultivated in a select group of children to become the Belial-themed Digimon MaloMyotismon (ベリアルヴァンデモン, BeriaruVandemon; BelialVamdemon). After killing Arukenimon and Mummymon in cold blood, he attempts to trap the new DigiDestined in illusions, but Davis breaks the others free. Myotismon battles the DigiDestined in the Digital World, but loses power with his body disintegrating as the Dark Flower children's dreams overcome their negativity. Myotismon's spirit is destroyed once and for all by Imperialdramon using power from all of the world's DigiDestined.
Apocalymon (アポカリモン, Apokarimon)
Voiced by: Chikao Ōtsuka (Japanese); Paul St. Peter (English)
Apocalymon is a Mega-level apocalypse-themed Digimon attached to a large structure from the waist down who serves as the first season's final antagonist that is responsible for the chaos in the Digital World. He was born within a void from the data of Digimon who died because they were unable to digivolve and adapt, becoming consumed by their collective sadness and rage as he grew to bitterly hate the Digital World itself. In the Japanese version, he refers to itself as "we". Besides his ability to regenerate, Apocalymon can use his structure's claw-like attachment to replicate the attacks of other Digimon while using his "reverse digivolve" to revert the DigiDestined's Digimon to their default forms. After replicating Devimon's Dark Claw to take the DigiDestined's Crests and destroy them, Apocalymon turns the DigiDestined and their Digimon into data. But the DigiDestined use the power of their Crests within their hearts to restore and heavily damage Apocalymon. He attempts to destroy everything with his final attack Total Annihilation, only for the power of the Digivices to confine the resulting explosion.
In Digimon Adventure tri., it is revealed that a shard of Apocalymon's data survived and incorporated itself into the core of Meicoomon, whom King Drasil and Dark Gennai exploit in their plan to destroy humanity. The plan failed with Meicoomon's demise, but Dark Gennai recovers the shard while taking his leave as he considers allying himself with either Daemon or Diaboromon.

==== Etemon's Army ====
The following make up Etemon's army:

Gazimon (ガジモン, Gajimon)
Voiced by: Richard Cansino, Derek Stephen Prince, Brianne Siddall, Michael Sorich, Terrence Stone
An army of cat/rabbit-themed Digimon of indeterminate species that make up Etemon's army and crew members.
Monochromon (モノクロモン, Monokuromon)
Voiced by: Ardwight Chamberlain, Michael Sorich
A Monoclonius-themed Digimon. While one Monochromon pulled Etemon's mode of transportation, there were an assortment of Monochromon that served him.
Kokatorimon (コカトリモン)
Voiced by: Matt K. Miller
A chicken-themed Digimon that worked for Etemon and posed as a sand cruise ship captain. He used his Petrifyer attack to turn most of the DigiDestined's Digimon to stone. After being defeated by Birdramon and Togemon, Kokatorimon tried to run his sand cruise ship into the DigiDestined only for it to collide with a giant-size cactus causing it to be destroyed with Kokatorimon caught in the explosion.
Tyrannomon (ティラノモン, Tiranomon)
Voiced by: Brianne Siddall, Michael Sorich, Kirk Thornton (ep. 21)
A Tyrannosaurus-themed Digimon. One Tyrannomon was sent to attack Piximon's oasis and was defeated by Greymon. An assortment of Tyrannomon serve Etemon.

==== Myotismon's Army ====
The following Digimon make up Myotismon's army which Gatomon was originally a member of:

DemiDevimon (ピコデビモン, Pikodebimon)
Voiced by: Kōki Miyata (Japanese); Derek Stephen Prince (English)
DemiDevimon is a Rookie-level blue bat/devil-themed Digimon and Myotismon's servant, initially sent by his master to keep the DigiDestined from regrouping while preventing them from activating their Crests. He then accompanied Myotismon to Tokyo and helped in the search for the eight child. Despite looking like a bat, DemiDevimon has a strong fear of them and Myotismon uses his bats to punish DemiDevimon for his failures. DemiDevimon escapes Myotismon's initial defeat and oversees the prophecy that leads to his resurrection as VenomMyotismon, who then devours DemiDevimon.
Phantomon (ファントモン, Fantomon)
Voiced by: Takahiro Sakurai (Japanese); David Guerrie (English)
Phantomon is an Ultimate-level phantom-themed Digimon that resembles the Grim Reaper. He is one of Myotismon's primary minions in his search for the eighth child as well as pulling his carriage. Phantomon leads the Bakemon guarding the convention center and participates in several battles with the DigiDestined, often emerging as the victor. When Phantomon led Tuskmon and Snimon in attacking Matt and Sora, Kari surrendered to him. During the final battle with Myotismon at the Fuji TV station, Phantomon is destroyed by Angemon's Hand of Fate when he was caught in the pathway of the attack that also struck Myotismon.
Bakemon (バケモン)
Voiced by: Mari Devon, David Greenlee, Michael Reisz, Michael Sorich, Dan Woren
An Obake Ghost-themed Digimon. Unlike the Bakemon that reside on File Island, these Bakemon work for Myotismon and are often led into battle by Phantomon. Many of them were slain by the DigiDestined's Digimon. They are powerful beings that aren't easily defeated, however, Joe recited a chant that would dispel them, which proved useful.
Nanimon (ナニモン)
Voiced by: Dave Mallow
A round-bodied Tamagotchi-themed Digimon that was brought in by DemiDevimon to train Myotismon's recruits in the form of a Sukamon, a Chuumon, some Numemon, and some Vegiemon. He and his students were scared off by the DigiDestined's Champion forms.
Devidramon (デビドラモン, Debidoramon)
A devil/dragon-themed Digmon. While one Devidramon pulls Myotismon's carriage, the other Devidramon were unleashed by Gatomon to provide a diversion on the DigiDestined so that Myotismon's forces can escape into the Real World after Nanimon and his students fled. While two Devidramon were slain by MetalGreymon, the rest were later slain by MegaKabuterimon.
Dokugumon (ドクグモン)
Voiced by: Mari Devon
A giant wolf spider-themed Digimon that serves as the property caretaker of Myotismon's castle. She and her "children" attacked the DigiDestined at the time when Myotismon's castle was collapsing, just as the DegiDestined were prepared to enter the gateway their home world. Dokugumon was slain by WereGarurumon.
Mammothmon (マンモン, Manmon)
Voiced by: Tom Wyner
A woolly mammoth-themed Digimon that served as the first opponent from Myotismon's army the Digidestined faced in the Real World. It puts up a great battle against Biyomon, and it was destroyed by Garudamon. In 02, an army of Mammothmon was created by Arukenimon from 200 Control Spires to put BlackWarGreymon's strength to the test, and were easily destroyed by BlackWarGreymon. In the 2020 Adventure series, a miasma-infected Mammon attacked Joe, Sora, and Matt, and their Digimon partners. It was destroyed by Zudomon.
Gesomon (ゲソモン)
Voiced by: Doug Erholtz
A squid-themed mollusk Digimon that served as the second opponent the Digidestined faced in the Real World. After a brutal fight, Ikakkumon destroyed Gesomon. In the 2020 Adventure series, a Gesomon guards the strait that the DigiDestined were trying to cross. After being lured onto land by Gomamon, Gesomon was defeated by Greymon, Togemon, Ikakkumon as it sank into the sea.
Raremon (レアモン, Reamon)
Voiced by: Terrence Stone
An undead flesh blob-themed Digimon that serves Myotismon. It ambushes Izzy and Tentomon at night while being cornered by DemiDevimon. It was destroyed by Kabuterimon.
SkullMeramon (デスメラモン, Desumeramon)
Voiced by: Dan Lorge
A humanoid fire Digimon who works for Myotismon. In the Real World, it disguises itself as a muscular man in a raincoat. It encounters Sora, Mimi, Palmon, and Biyomon and attacks them. SkullMeramon was defeated by MetalGreymon.
Pumpkinmon (パンプモン, Panpumon)
Voiced by: Joshua Seth
A pumpkin/stuffed toy-themed Digimon. When Myotismon was displeased with his failure, he dealt with Pumpkinmon who tried to fight back. In the original Japanese version, Pumpkinmon was destroyed by Myotismon. In the English dub, Pumpkinmon was sent to Myotismon's dungeon.
Gotsumon (ゴツモン)
Voiced by: Tom Fahn
A humanoid rock-themed Digimon who is Pumpkinmon's companion. When Myotismon was displeased with his failure, he dealt with Gotsumon who tried to fight back. In the original Japanese version, he and Pumpkinmon were destroyed by Myotismon. In the English dub, they were sent to Myotismon's dungeon.
Gizamon (ギザモン)
Voiced by: Barbara Goodson, Dave Mallow
An army of furry frog-themed Digimon. When Matt, Gabumon, T.K., and Patamon later accompanied them, Myotismon's bats absorbed them in order to restore Myotismon as VenomMyotismon.
DarkTyrannomon (ダークティラノモン, Dākutiranomon)
Voiced by: Michael Sorich
A Tyrannosaurus-themed Digimon. It is the result of a Tyrannomon that gets infected by a virus. After Lilymon pacifies it with her Flower Wreath, Myotismon retaliates. In the original Japanese version, Myotismon destroys DarkTyrannomon. In the English dub, Myotismon sends DarkTyrannomon back to the Digital World.
MegaSeadramon (メガシードラモン, Megashīdoramon)
Voiced by: Robert Axelrod
A sea dragon-themed Digimon that served Myotismon. It blocks Joe and T.K.'s path and attacks them. Ikakkumon digivolves to Zudomon for the first time and defeats MegaSeadramon, sending it falling into the sea. In 02, a MegaSeadramon was under control of the Dark Spiral with the English dub having Ikkakumon identifying it as his old opponent. Armadillomon Armor-Digivolves to Submarimon for the first time and frees MegaSeadramon from the Dark Spiral. In the 2020 Adventure series, a MegaSeadramon was summoned by a WaruSeadramon to aid it against the Digidestined. Both MegaSeadramon and WaruSeadramon were destroyed by Garudamon.
Tuskmon (タスクモン, Tasukumon)
Voiced by: Jeff Nimoy
A dinosaur-themed Digimon with tusk-like horns coming out of its shoulders. It accompanied Phantomon in attacking Matt and Sora. Tuskmon was later knocked out by Zudomon and later absorbed by Myotismon's bats to restore him as VenomMyotismon.
Snimon (スナイモン, Sunaimon)
Voiced by: Bob Buchholz
A mantis-themed Digimon. It accompanied Phantomon and Tuskmon in attacking Matt and Sora. Snimon was later knocked out by WereGarurumon and later absorbed by Myotismon's bats to restore him as VenomMyotismon.

==== Dark Masters ====
The Dark Masters (ダークマスターズ, Dāku Masutāzu) are a group consisting of four evil Mega-level Digimon who are extensions of Apocalymon. In Digimon Adventure tri., they are revealed to have made a previous attempt to kill the first DigiDestined but are defeated after Tapirmon sacrificed himself so his fellow Digimon can digivolve into the Digimon Sovereigns. In 1999, the Dark Masters take advantage of the DigiDestined's absence by sealing away the Sovereigns and converting the Digital World into Spiral Mountain which is divided into four territories. As the DigiDestined learn, each Dark Master's defeat causes their domain to dissolve and be restored to its original form.

MetalSeadramon (メタルシードラモン, Metarushīdoramon)
Voiced by: Yuuto Kazama (Japanese); Doug Erholtz (English)
MetalSeadramon is a giant Cyborg variant of Seadramon covered in golden armor called Chrome Digizoid and rules over the oceans of Spiral Mountain. MetalSeadramon is served by his Deep Savers army, consisting of his general Scorpiomon and a group of Divermon. Extremely stubborn, temperamental, and arrogant, he is the first of the Dark Masters who attempts to destroy the DigiDestined. MetalSeadramon is eventually destroyed by WarGreymon ripping through the Dark Master's mouth. In Digimon Adventure tri. Loss, a post-reboot infected MetalSeadramon serves Dark Gennai, and is defeated by WarGreymon and MetalGarurumon.
Puppetmon (ピノッキモン, Pinokkimon)
Voiced by: Etsuko Kozakura (Japanese); David Lodge (English)
Puppetmon is a Puppet-type Digimon inspired by Pinocchio with a playful personality despite being childish with a rotten temper, treating his Wind Guardians minions Kiwimon, Blossomon, Mushroomon, Floramon, Deramon, Cherrymon, and an army of RedVegiemon as disposable playthings. Controlling the forest portion of Spiral Mountain, he lives in a toy-like mansion which can transform into a giant wooden robot. While he can control others with strings and has an arsenal of real firearms, his favoured weapon to wield is the Bullet Hammer mallet, which uses energy blasts. When the DigiDestined enter his domain, Puppetmon abducts T.K. to have a playmate in a life-and-death game of hide and seek before the boy tricked him and escaped. Puppetmon and Cherrymon manage to sow dissent amongst the DigiDestined, eventually causing their group to split up, but Puppetmon becomes upset by and disregards Cherrymon's warning not to underestimate the strength of friendship between the DigiDestined. Puppetmon is forced to flee from Tai's group after they destroy his house and ends up being killed by MetalGarurumon.
Machinedramon (ムゲンドラモン, Mugendoramon)
Voiced by: Hisao Egawa (Japanese); Dave Guerrie (English)
Machinedramon is a dragon-like Machine Digimon armed with his two back-mounted Infinity Cannons, possessing an emotionless, cold, and calculating mind. He often resorts to military strategies in combat, including scorched earth strategies. He rules over Spiral Mountain's cityscape, and commands the Metal Empire, which includes WaruMonzaemon, Megadramon, Gigadramon, several Hagurumon, and a multitude of Mekanorimon and Tankmon. Machinedramon targets the DigiDestined as they explore the city, leading them to fall into the city's lower levels. He destroys hundreds of Numemon previously enslaved by his minion WaruMonzaemon, before being defeated by WarGreymon. In Digimon Adventure tri. Loss, a post-reboot infected Machinedramon is summoned by Dark Gennai and destroyed by Phoenixmon, HerculesKabuterimon, and Seraphimon. In the 2020 Adventure series, Agumon digivolves to an incomplete Machinedramon after DanDevimon consumes Tai, attacking in a berserker rage before Angemon pacifies him. Later, Sakkakumon and Vademon use the data the former amassed from Agumon to create another Machinedramon to assist them in freeing Milleniumon's miasma from the Cloud Continent while overpowering the Digidestined and their Digimon partners. Tai and WarGreymon manage to defeat Machinedramon while the other Digidestined had time to take cover. However, the Vademon activate Machinedramon's self destruct and propel itself into the Cloud Continent to complete its objective.
Piedmon (ピエモン, Piemon)
Voiced by: Chikao Ōtsuka (Japanese); Derek Stephen Prince (English)
Piedmon is the leader of the Dark Masters, a pierrot-themed Demon Man Digimon. He possesses a number of magical tricks and wields four swords with. He maintains an upbeat but sadistic sense of humor, displaying a passion for fighting. Four years prior to the events of the first series, Piedmon led an army of Guardromon and Mekanorimon in attacking the Agents' base. He stole all the crests and tags but Gennai protected the Digi-Eggs. Piedmon lives on top of Spiral Mountain in a large observatory-funhouse building in a rocky wasteland, served by his demonic army, the Nightmare Soldiers, consisting of his right-hand LadyDevimon and a multitude of Vilemon. However, after his forces were defeated by the DigiDestined's army of Digimon allies, he is sealed away via MagnaAngemon's Gate of Destiny after being sent flying into it by WarGreymon and MetalGarurumon's attacks. The English dub had him speaking in the style of Tim Curry, but with a "twist".

===== Dark Master's Army =====
The following make up the different armies of the Dark Masters:

Scorpiomon (アノマロカリモン, Anomarokarimon)
Voiced by: Lex Lang
An Anomalocaris-themed Digimon that worked for MetalSeadramon. After trapping most of the DigiDestined in a hut trap, Scorpiomon was knocked out by Lillymon and Zudomon. Upon MetalSeadramon setting fire to the hut, Scorpiomon ran out and put himself out. MetalSeadramon destroyed Scorpiomon for his failure.
Divermon (ハンギョモン, Hangyomon)
Gold Leader Voiced by: Jeff Nimoy
Blue Leader Voiced by: Tom Fahn
Red Leader Voiced by: Michael Sorich
An army of piscine humanoid-themed Digimon in diving attire that worked for MetalSeadramon. Most of them were destroyed by Zudomon.
Kiwimon (キウイモン, Kiuimon)
Voiced by: Paul St. Peter
A kiwi/kiwifruit-themed Digimon that worked for Puppetmon. He was sent to keep the DigiDestined from finding T.K. Kiwimon was destroyed by Birdramon.
Cherrymon (ジュレイモン, Jureimon)
Voiced by: Jeff Nimoy
A cherry tree-themed Digimon that works for Puppetmon. He was dispatched to make Matt think that Tai was his rival. Once Cherrymon gave Puppetmon some word of advice after informing him of his plan worked, Puppetmon slew Cherrymon.
Garbagemon (ガーベモン, Gābemon)
Garbagemon #1 Voiced by: Dan Lorge
Garbagemon #2 Voiced by: Doug Erholtz
Garbagemon #3 Voiced by: Dave Mallow
A trio of garbage-themed Digimon that ride in garbage cans and work for Puppetmon. One Garbagemon was slain by Lillymon and another was slain by MetalGreymon. When the final one tried to suck the DigiDestined into its garbage can, it was slain by MetalGarurumon.
Blossomon (ブロッサモン, Burossemon)
Voiced by: Julie Maddalena
A flower-themed Digimon that lived in Puppetmon's lair. T.K. encountered her and Mushroomon when fleeing Puppetmon. They claimed to Puppetmon that they haven't seen him. While the original Japanese version had Puppetmon killing Blossomon and Mushroomon upon assuming that they are lying to him, that scene was edited out in the English dub.
Mushroomon (マッシュモン, Masshumon)
Voiced by: Lex Lang
A mushroom-themed Digimon that lived in Puppetmon's lair. T.K encountered him and Blossomon when fleeing Puppetmon. They claimed to Puppetmon that they haven't seen him. While the original Japanese version had Puppetmon killing Mushroomon and Blossomon upon assuming that they are lying to him, that scene was edited out in the English dub.
Floramon (フローラモン, Furōramon)
Voiced by: Mona Marshall
A plant/reptile-themed Digimon. She and Deremon work as the guards of Puppetmon's lair and agreed to help the DigiDestined. Prior to Puppetmon summoning the RedVeggiemon, Floramon and Deramon fled. Her whereabouts are unknown.
Deramon (デラモン)
Voiced by: Doug Erholtz
A bird-themed Digimon with a bush growing out of his back. He and Floramon work as the guards of Puppetmon's lair and agreed to help the DigiDestined. Prior to Puppetmon summoning the RedVeggimon, Deramon and Floramon fled. His whereabouts are unknown.
Guardromon (ガードロモン, Gādoramon)
A robotic Digimon. An Army of Guardromon were seen with Piedmon in a flashback attacking the facility where Gennai worked.
RedVegiemon (レッドべジーモン, Reddobejīmon)
Voiced by: Dan Lorge
An army of vegetable-themed Digimon that work for Puppetmon.
Hagurumon (ハグルモン)
Hagurumon #1 Voiced by: Lex Lang
Hagurumon #2 Voiced by: Tom Fahn
Two floating gear-themed Digimon that worked for Machinedramon. Following Machinedramon's defeat, their fates are unknown.
Mekanorimon (メカノリモン)
Voiced by: Bob Buccholz, Dan Lorge
A robotic exoskeleton-themd Digimon. They are not living Digimon as they are operated by the Bakemon. An army of Mekanorimon were seen with Piedmon in a flashback attacking the facility where Gennai worked. One Mekanorimon was commandeered by Gennai who threw its Bakemon pilot out and used it to escape with the DigiEggs of the DigiDestined's Digimon. Another army of Mekanorimon served Machinedramon. Following Machinedramon's defeat, their fates are unknown.
Tankmon (タンクモン, Tankumon)
Voiced by: Steve Blum
An army of tank-themed Digimon serve Machinedramon. Following Machinedramon's defeat, their fates are unknown.
Megadramon (メガドラモン, Megadoramon)
Voiced by: Dave Mallow
A dragon-themed Digimon with a snake tail instead of legs who works for Machinedramon. Following Machinedramon's defeat, his fate is unknown.
Gigadramon (ギガドラモン, Gigadoramon)
Voiced by: Kirk Thornton
A dragon-themed Digimon that resembles a recolored version of his companion Megadramon. Following Machinedramon's defeat, his fate is unknown.
WaruMonzaemon (ワルもんざえモン, WaruMonzaemon)
Voiced by: Dan Lorge
A wicked teddy bear-themed Digimon with claws on his left hand that works for Machinedramon and enslaved the Numemon. After being bested by Angewoman, Birdramon, and Angemon, WaruMonzaemon informed Machinedramon about what happened causing Machinedramon to detonate the room that WaruMonzaemon was in. In the original Japanese version, that killed WaruMonzaemon. In the English dub, WaruMonzaemon quoted "He shot off my paw".
LadyDevimon (レディーデビモン, Redīdebimon)
Voiced by: Melodee Spevack
A female devil-themed Digimon She appears as Piedmon's lieutenant and the commander of his Nightmare Soldiers. She engaged in a slapping, hair-pulling catfight with Angewomon and defeats her with a roundhouse kick. However, MegaKabuterimon prevents LadyDevimon from finishing Angewomon off with her Darkness Spear by blocking the attack with his hard carapace. Angewoman then proceeds to slay LadyDevimon.
Vilemon (イビルモン, Ibirumon)
Voiced by: Bob Buchholz, Jeff Nimoy
An army of imp-themed Digimon that make up Piedmon's army. He unleashes them on the DigiDestined. While most of them were destroyed, the remaining ones were sucked into MagnaAngemon's Gate of Destiny.

=== Adventure 02 antagonists ===
Kimeramon (キメラモン)
Voiced by: Kaneto Shiozawa (Japanese); Tom Wyner (English)
Kimeramon is a Chimera Digimon created by the Digimon Emperor to be his ideal partner Digimon in taking over the Digital World. Kimeramon has Kabuterimon's head, Greymon's lower jaw and torso, Garurumon's back legs, Monochromon's tail, one of Kuwagamon's left arms, SkullGreymon's right arm, Airdramon's wings, Angemon's top wings, and MetalGreymon's hair. After acquiring the data remains of Devimon, manifesting in his upper arms, Ken completes Kimeramon. However, Devimon's data makes him uncontrollable. When Davis uses the Digi-Egg of Miracles, Magnamon uses Wormmon's power to destroy Kimeramon.
In the 2020 Adventure series, Kimeramon was initially a Digimon named Sakakkumon, a mass of orbs tasked by the Vademon to collect data from various Digimon to construct Milleniummon's new body. Among the Digimon whose data he copied are Patamon, Tentomon, Gabumon, and Agumon with his data used to create Machinedramon. When the time for Milleniummon's resurrection comes, Sakakkumon uses the collected data to digivolve himself into Kimeramon and offers his body for MoonMilleniummon to possess before being destroyed by Goldramon and Mangadramon.
Yukio Oikawa (及川 悠紀夫, Oikawa Yukio)
Voiced by: Toshiyuki Morikawa (Japanese); Jamieson Price (English)
Oikawa is a human aware of the Digimon's existence. As a child, he and Cody Hida's father, Hiroki, promised to visit the Digital World together. After Hiroki's death, Oikawa makes a deal with Myotismon to enter the Digital World, leading him to becoming possessed. Under Myotismon's influence, Oikawa creates Arukenimon and Mummymon. They then abduct various kids to absorb power from the Dark Spores implanted in them. When Oikawa tries to enter the Digital World, he instead enters the World of Dreams and is mortally wounded by Myotismon. After the DigiDestined permanently defeat MaloMyotismon, Oikawa meets Datrinimon and uses the World of Dreams to convert himself into data-based butterflies, restoring the Digital World.
Arukenimon (アルケニモン)
Voiced by: Wakana Yamazaki (Japanese); Mari Devon (English)
Arukenimon is a drider-like Demon Beast Digimon based on the mythical Arachne. She is cunning, intelligent, and temperamental. After secretly overseeing Ken's actions as the Digimon Emperor, she appears before the DigiDestined in her human form and uses her "Spirit Needle" hair to transform Control Spires into enemy Digimon. In the end, Arukenimon is brutally tortured and then killed by MaloMyotismon.
Mummymon (マミーモン, Mamīmon)
Voiced by: Toshiyuki Morikawa (Japanese); Kirk Thornton (English)
Mummymon is a mummy Digimon who has a crush on Arukenimon. Created by Oikawa, he wears a hat, royal blue coat, and wields a cane. He is finally killed by MaloMyotismon when he tries to avenge Arukenimon.
BlackWarGreymon (ブラックウォーグレイモン, Burakkuwōgureimon)
Voiced by: Nobuyuki Hiyama (Japanese); Steve Blum (English)
BlackWarGreymon is an artificial black Digimon clone of WarGreymon, created by Arukenimon from a hundred Control Spires. He becomes self-aware and undergoes an existential crisis. He tries to find purpose by battling Azulongmon and destroys six of the seven the Destiny Stones to face him. When Azulongmon appears with the DigiDestined's help and defeats him, BlackWarGreymon is reprimanded for endangering their realities. He later confronts Oikawa for disrupting the balance of both the Real and Digital worlds. After being fatally wounded by a Myotismon-possessed Oikawa, BlackWarGreymon sacrifices himself to become a seal to the Highton View Terrace gate in order to prevent Myotismon from entering the Digital World.
Millenniummon (ミレニアモン, Mireniamon)
An ancient evil god Digimon that Ken encountered during his first visit to the Digital World, implanting a dark spore into the child's body upon his death. In the 2020 Adventure series, ZeedMillenniummon was a living weapon used by Ghoulmon's army that nearly destroyed Digital World in the past before being defeated by Omnimon along with Seraphimon and Ophanimon. His being was scattered in the form of miasma in the Cloud Continent and various crystals, the largest holding his weakened essence as MoonMillenniummon. Served by the Vademon, Milleniumon sought to make the power of the Digidestined Digimon his own while resurrecting himself. Having originally planned to make AxeKnightmon his body before she was purified to Gatomon, Millenniumon enlists Sakakkumon to gather the data on the Digidestined Digimon and become Kimeramon. After absorbing Kimeramon and his miasma, a revived Millenniummon captures the DigiDestinated save Tai and Agumon as they manage to free their friends. Though his body is destroyed by Magnadramon and Goldramon, he becomes ZeedMillenniummon once again and tries to destroy the entire Digital World before WarGreymon destroys him for good.

==== Daemon Corps ====
The Daemon Corps (デーモン軍団, Dēmon Gundan) are a group named after their master, Daemon, and consisted of him and three Virus Ultimate-level Digimon. They appeared on December 26, 2002, in Japan to retrieve the Dark Spore within Ken.

Daemon (デーモン, Dēmon)
Voiced by: Masami Kikuchi (Japanese); Bob Papenbrook (English)
Daemon is the leader of the Daemon Corps, a wrathful Mega-level Cacodemon-themed Digimon whose robes conceal his true appearance. He is able to traverse between worlds. Ken uses his inner darkness to change the portal's location to the Dark Ocean, trapping Daemon there.
SkullSatamon (スカルサタモン, Sukarusatamon)
Voiced by: Takahiro Sakurai (Japanese); David Guerrie (English)
SkullSatamon is a skeleton/fallen angel-themed Digimon. He attacks the city, and uses his Nail Bone attack to paralyze Imperialdramon: Dragon Mode, only to be destroyed by Imperialdramon: Fighter Mode.
LadyDevimon (レディーデビモン, Redīdebimon)
Voiced by: Ai Nagano (Japanese); Melodee Spevack (English)
LadyDevimon is a femme fatale-like Fallen Angel Digimon with the appearance of a seductive, bewitching woman. Because of the unparalleled strength and purity of its Dark Side Power, it is said that the limits on its spread and growth on personal computers is "0". Her signature move is Darkness Wave, which unleashes a screeching horde of ravenous, demonic bats, alight with unholy flames, to engulf, devour, and incinerate the victim. Unlike the LadyDevimon that worked for Piedmon, LadyDevimon is a member of the Daemon Corps, attacking the highways and engaging in yet another catfight with Angewomon. She overpowers and defeats Angewomon by twisting both of Angewomon's arms against her sides, but retreats when WereGarurumon and Garudamon appeared. She resurfaces in order to take Ken from Yukio Oikawa and squares off against Silphymon. She defeats Silphymon by knocking him into the ground with her Darkness Wave. As she is about to finish Silphymon off with Poison, Inoue Miyako smacked her with a skateboard. This distracts Ladydevimon and permits Silphymon to attack her from behind, defeating her.
MarineDevimon (マリンデビモン, Marindebimon)
Voiced by: Kaneto Shiozawa (Japanese); Tom Wyner (English)
MarineDevimon is an aquatic devil/squid-themed Demon Digimon with ink-based attacks. In Adventure 02, MarineDevimon is a member of the Daemon Corps who first appeared to menace a cruise ship on which a wedding was taking place. He first fights Angemon and Submarimon with no problems, but retreats when Zudomon appears. When he resurfaces in order to take Ken from Yukio Oikawa, MarineDevimon is finally destroyed by Shakkoumon. In the 2020 Adventure series, MarineDevimon was a fragment of Millenniummon. It was defeated by Angewomon.

=== Adventure tri. antagonists ===
King Drasil (イグドラシル, Igudorashiru)
King Drasil is a host computer being in the form of a tree who serves as the antagonist of Digimon Adventure tri., working with Dark Gennai to force Meicoomon into embracing Apocalymon's data fragment in a scheme to destroy humanity and absorb the Real World. However, the plan fails after Omnimon destroys Ordinemon and Drasil is shut down by Homeostasis.
Dark Gennai (闇ゲンナイ, Yami Gennai)
Voiced by: Hiroaki Hirata (Japanese); Jeff Nimoy (Dark Gennai), Todd Haberkorn (as Digimon Emperor) (English)
Dark Gennai is an evil shapeshifter clone of Gennai who believes humans would eventually enslave the Digimon. After placing the real Gennai in a stasis pod alongside Davis, Yolei, Cody and Ken, initially assuming the real Ken's Digimon Emperor form, Dark Gennai helps King Drasil in his scheme of using Meicoomon to destroy humanity. Following Ordinemon's destruction, Dark Gennai recovers the fragment of Apocalymon's data and leaves to seek out new allies from the DigiDestined's enemies like Daemon and Diaboromon.
Alphamon (アルファモン, Arufamon)
Alphamon is a black-armored exalted-knight Digimon who appears in Digimon Adventure tri., armed with the Holy Sword Gradalpha and the Ouryuken (王竜剣) broadsword. He is King Drasil's servant who defeats Davis, Yolei, Cody and Ken when they were lured into a trap by Himekawa. Alphamon later makes attempts to capture Meicoomon, from being driven off by Omnimon and later ended up in an all-out fight with Meicoomon, Jesmon, and Omnimon.
Maki Himekawa (姫川 マキ, Himekawa Maki)
Voiced by: Yuko Kaida (Japanese); Cherami Leigh (English)
Maki is Daigo's ex-girlfriend and a government agent from the Incorporate Administrative Agency. She hides crucial information concerning Meicoomon's power and the location of the missing DigiDestined. Loss revealed that Maki was one of the DigiDestined predating Tai's group, serving as Homeostasis' medium like Kari. She became disillusioned over her partner Tapirmon needing to sacrifice himself for the Digital World. This influenced Maki to ally herself with Dark Gennai to revive Tapirmon through the Digital World's reboot, arranging Meicoomon's abduction to commence the event and concealing the disappearance of Davis and the others new DigiDestined from Tai's group. Though the reboot succeeds, Himekawa suffers a mental breakdown over Tapirmon not remembering her and is last seen descending into the Dark Ocean.

=== Film antagonists ===
Parrotmon (パロットモン, Parottomon)
Voiced by: Yoshihito Sasaki (DA:LEK) (Japanese); David Lodge (The Movie), Aaron LaPlante (DA:LEK) (English)
Parrotmon is a large bird Digimon, who invaded Highton View Terrace in 1996. He is defeated by Greymon, but his presence led to higher powers in the Digital World to choose the eight DigiDestined. He appears in the first part of Digimon: The Movie. This flashback was later visited in two episodes. Fourteen years later, in Digimon Adventure: Last Evolution Kizuna, another Parrotmon appear in the real world though it is defeated by MetalGreymon, Angewomon, Angemon, and WereGarurumon.
In the 2020 Adventure series, he appears out of the sky to attack MetalGreymon. During the fight, Parrotmon digivolves to Eaglemon when he was struck by MoonMillenniummon's dark power. Following a brutal battle, Eaglemon was destroyed by WarGreymon.
Diaboromon (ディアボロモン)
Voiced by: Unvoiced (Japanese); Paul St. Peter (English)
Diaboromon is a computer virus Digimon who first appears in Digimon Adventure: Our War Game! (the second part of Digimon: The Movie). First appearing as a Digi-Egg, he invades the Internet after hatching into Kuramon and wreaks havoc across Japan's electrical systems while Digivolving to Keramon, Infermon, and finally Diaboromon. He launches nuclear missiles to wipe out the DigiDestined and potentially spark World War III. However, Omnimon destroys Diaboromon and his clones, causing the missiles to crash harmlessly into the water. In Revenge of Diaboromon, Diaboromon returns where he is confronted by Omnimon, Angemon, and Angewomon. When he is struck down by Omnimon again, he sends millions of Kuramon into Tokyo to combine into Armageddemon in order to destroy it. Imperialdramon Paladin Mode defeats Armageddemon.
Wendigomon (ウェンディモン, Endimon)
Voiced by: Tomomichi Nishimura, Mamiko Noto (Chocomon) (Japanese); Paul St. Peter (Wendigomon and Cherubimon), Wendee Lee (Kokomon) (English)
Wendigomon is a beast Digimon based on the Wendigo who appears in Hurricane Touchdown (the third part of Digimon: The Movie). He is Terriermon's twin brother and Willis' other partner Digimon, who mysteriously disappeared in his In-Training level form, Kokomon. He resurfaced in his corrupted Champion-level form as Wendigomon and abducted any DigiDestined with an original Digivice to his pocket dimension. Wendigomon's goal was to "go back" to how things were; Willis' failed attempts to reason with him caused him to digivolve into corrupted versions of the rabbit-themed Antylamon and the rabbit/cherub-themed Cherubimon. Magnamon and Rapidmon managed to defeat Cherubimon from within, and he is resurrected as a Digi-Egg.
Dr. Menoa Bellucci (メノア・ベルッチ 博士, Menoa Berutchi Hakase)
Voiced by: Mayu Matsuoka (Japanese); Erika Harlacher (English)
The main antagonist in Digimon Adventure: Last Evolution Kizuna. She is a scientist furthering Digimon research at a University in New York. Her partner used to be Morphomon, who was vanished from the Real World when Menoa received her admission letter to university. That event drove Menoa mad to the point of creating Eosmon, with the intention of robbing the consciousnesses from every DigiDestined around the world, as she believes to be preventing them from suffering the same fate as she and Morphomon did. Once Eosmon was destroyed, Menoa sees a brief vision of Morphomon. Afterwards, Menoa was arrested by the authorities.
Eosmon (エオスモン, Eosumon)
An artificial Eos-themed Digimon that appears in Digimon Adventure: Last Evolution Kizuna, created by Menoa Belucci in the image of the morpho-themed Morphomon. Initially a Champion Level Digimon that digivolved to its Ultimate form during its first battle against the DigiDestined. During the final battle, Ultimate Level Eosmon cloned itself. When the DigiDestined started destroying the clones, the desperate Menoa allowed herself to fuse with the original Eosmon, which digivolved to its Mega form. The majority of the clones as well as the Mega Level Eosmon were finally destroyed by Agumon (Bond of Bravery) and Gabumon (Bond of Friendship).

=== Adventure 2020 antagonists ===
Argomon (アルゴモン, Arugomon)
Voiced by: Takashi Matsuyama (Japanese); Xander Mobus (English)
Several Argus Panoptes-themed computer virus Digimon created by Negamon to invade the network, sabotaging the Human World's network while transferring its data to their creator. The first batch of Argomon were defeated by Greymon and Garurumon, and their leader was destroyed by Omnimon. Later on, the second batch of Argomon invaded the ship cargo's network along with a Calmaramon, but they were all defeated by the combined attacks of Biyomon, Tentomon, and Palmon in their Ultimate level forms while Gomamon in his Ultimate form destroys the virus plaguing the ship's network, returning to normal. Later on, the third batch of Argomon kidnapped Tai and Agumon, and their leader is an Ultimate level who has much of a humanoid appearance and can speak. They act on Negamon's command to test Agumon who is the real Tai and Agumon successfully finds the real Tai. The third batch of Argomon were destroyed by WarGreymon while the leader retreats. The Argomon leader digivolves to its Mega form, but was finally destroyed before the Digidestined fought Negamon.
Eyesmon (アイズモン, Aizumon)
A shadowy jet-black dragon-themed Digimon with thousands of eyes that can become its multiple Scatter Mode forms. Eyesmon was responsible for causing the blackouts in Tokyo. It lured the Digidestined into a fake Tokyo zone and attacked them. Although Eyesmon was defeated, its remains digivolved to its Ultimate form, Orochimon. It was defeated by the combined attacks of the Digidestined's partner Digimon, but soon Digivolves into its Mega form, Nidhoggmon. It starts a countdown to wipe out Tokyo out of existence, but was destroyed by Omnimon. Nidhoggmon was voiced by Volcano Õta in the Japanese version.
Ghoulmon (デスモン, Desumon)
Voiced by: Volcano Õta
A ghoul-themed Demon Digimon that was the leader of the Dark Demon Army during the ancient war, scattering his being in the form of the eighth note-themed Soundbirdmon to aid Negamon by brainwashing innocent Digimon to do their bidding and attack the Digidestined, who assumed the Soundbirdmon were Devimon's minions. Later on, one swarm of Soundbirmon merge back to Ghoulmon and is destroyed by Ophanimon and Seraphimon. Ghoulmon is voiced by Volcano Õta in the Japanese version.
SkullKnightmon/AxeKnightmon (スカルナイトモン/ダークナイトモン, Sukarunaitomon/Dākunaitomon)
Voiced by: Mie Sonozaki (Japanese); Xander Mobus (English)
A humanoid death knight-themed clad in black who served Devimon and Millenniummon. It is later revealed that SkullKnightmon was actually Gatomon's corrupted form created by the miasma swamp born from her DigiEgg. Upon AxeKnightmon's defeat, she reverts into her true form, Gatomon, and becomes Kari Digimon Partner.
Negamon (ネガーモン, Negāmon)
Voiced by: Takashi Matsuyama(as Abbadomon Core)
A tentacled Cyclops-themed Digimon and the main antagonist in the 2020 Digimon Adventure series. It is also known as The Great Catastrophe, responsible for the Dark Digimon war behind other antagonists such as Devimon and Millenniummon. It dwells in the white void of the Digital World in a dark orb. It becomes its sperm whale-themed evolved form and attacks the Digidestined and their Digimon partners. Upon being defeated, it became the Abaddon-themed Abbadomon and its core, while Omnimon enters Abbadomon and fights Abbadomon Core. It was finally destroyed by Omnimon Alter-S.

=== 2020 enemies ===
WaruSeadramon (ワルシードラモン, Warushīdoramon)
A dark version of MegaSeadramon who evolved from a Seadramon after eating an Ebidramon. It was destroyed along with MegaSeadramon by Garudamon.
Groundramon
A colossal dragon-themed Digimon that preys on weaker Digimon for survival. It was destroyed by the combined attacks of MetalGreymon, WereGarurumon, Garudamon, MegaKabuterimon, Lillymon and Zudomon.
Fangmon (ファングモン, Fangumon)
Several red wolf/Big Bad Wolf-themed Digimon that served a Cerberusmon. They were destroyed by Garudamon, MetalGreymon, and Pegasusmon.
Boltmon
A Frankenstein's monster-like android who serves as an outlaw in the Digital World. In the past, it defeated Rebellimon in a duel. In the end during their second battle, Rebellimon was able to get revenge and defeat Boltmon thanks to Cutemon's help.

== Recurring characters ==
=== Digital World ===
Gennai (ゲンナイ)
Young Voiced by: Hiroaki Hirata (Japanese); Jeff Nimoy, Steve Blum ("A Million Points of Light") (English)
Old Voiced by: Joji Yanami (Japanese); Mike Reynolds, Jason Marnocha (OWG re-dub) (English)
Gennai is a data-based human and is a guide to the DigiDestined. Four years ago, Gennai protected all eight Digi-Eggs from Piedmon and sends them to File Island, though he accidentally loses Gatomon's egg in the process. As an elder, he assigns them to retrieve all lost crests and tags at the Server Continent. After Tai and his friends destroy Apocalymon, Gennai sends the kids home, suggesting that they leave their partners in the Digital World. In Digimon Adventure 02, Gennai uses the DigiCore given from Azulongmon and regains his youthful appearance. When Digimon begin appearing around the world, he helps the DigDestined remove all evidence with his clones.
Benjamin (ベンジャミン)
Voiced by: Michael Lindsay
Gennai's American clone.
Jackie (ジャッキー, Jakkī)
Voiced by: Jeff Nimoy
Gennai's China clone
Hogan (ユーカリ, Yūkari)
Voiced by: Neil Kaplan
Gennai's Australian clone who showed up to Joe and Cody dressed as Santa Claus in an old-fashioned swimsuit and water shoes.
José (ホセ, Hose)
Voiced by: Michael Sorich
Gennai's Mexican clone.
Ilya (イリア, Iria)
Voiced by: Neil Kaplan
Gennai's Russian clone.
Homeostasis (ホメオスタシス, Homeosutashisu)
Homeostasis is a digital lifeform and one of the host computers that run the Digital World. First appearing in Adventure, it possessed Kari to show the DigiDestined the history of the Digital World.
In the Digimon Adventure tri films, Homeostasis is the one who had the Digimon of the original DigiDestined digivolve to the Harmonious Ones during a losing battle against the Dark Masters. While the DigiDestined originally consider Homeostasis an ally, they eventually realize the being does not share their ideals and acts only to protect the Digital World at any cost. Homeostasis later forces King Drasil to shut down after Ordinemon's defeat for the program's role in the crisis.
Meramon (メラモン)
Voiced by: Hidetoshi Nakamura (Japanese); Peter Spellos (English)
A Champion-level fire spirit Digimon and a neighbor of the Yokomon Village living in Mount Miharashi on File Island. He is possessed by a Black Gear, but Birdramon destroys it. Meramon later helped the File Island Digimon in building a raft for the DigiDestined to get to the Server Continent. He later joins Mimi and Joe's army to fight the Dark Masters.
Numemon (ヌメモン)
Voiced by: Yūji Ueda, Hiroaki Hirata, Masami Kikuchi (Japanese); Jonathan Fahn, Dave Mallow, Joshua Seth (English)
A Rookie-level slug-like mutant Digimon living in the sewers. They have difficulty adapting to sunlight. They chased the DigiDestined at File Island, but came to their aid against Monzaemon after their leader meets Mimi. A second group of Numemon worked for Etemon's minion Kokatorimon on his sand cruise ship. They fled when Birdramon and Togemon defeated Kokatorimon. A third group of Numemon appear as slaves for WaruMonzaemon in Machinedramon's city, but rebel against him, praising Kari as their savior. Machinedramon then destroys the rebelling Nunemon.
Andromon (アンドロモン, Andoromon)
Voiced by: Kiyoyuki Yanada (Japanese); Michael Sorich (English)
An Ultimate-level cyborg Digimon whom the DigiDestined meet in a factory on File Island, he is possessed by a Black Gear, but Kabuterimon destroys it. Later, Andromon aids the DigiDestined in their fight against the Dark Masters when reuniting with them in Machinedramon's territory. In Digimon Adventure 02, Andromon is possessed by a Dark Ring, but comes across Tai, T.K., and Kari in a domed city, each face activating part of his old memory, which he recalls as a photograph he took of their last meeting four years ago. After breaking free from the Dark Ring, Andromon destroys the Dark Spire and remains in the domed city to reprogram the Guardromon that were controlled by the Dark Rings. In the 2020 series, Andromon was brainwashed by a Soundbirdmon, and attacks Izzy, Mimi, Palmon, Tai, and Agumon. Palmon becomes Lillymon and defeats Andromon.
Monzaemon (もんざえモン)
Voiced by: Hiroki Takahashi (Japanese); Dan Lorge (English)
A teddy bear-themed Digimon that lives in Toy Town. He captured most of the DigiDestined until being defeated by Togemon got tbe Black Gear out of him. Monzaemon was later seen when some of the File Island inhabitants helped to build a raft so that the DigiDestined can get to the Server Continent.
Unimon (ユニモン, Yunimon)
Voiced by: Doug Erholtz
A winged unicorn-themed Digimon that Joe and Gomamon encountered on Infinity Mountain. Gomamon claims that Unimon is wise and mostly stays quiet while not interacting with the other File Island inhabitants. It got possessed by a Black Gear and attacked Joe and Gomamon. Unimon was freed from the Black Gear by Ikkakumon. Later on, Unimon was among the Digimon that helped to fight Piedmon's army of Vilemon.
Leomon (レオモン, Reomon)
Voiced by: Hiroaki Hirata (Japanese); Paul St. Peter (English)
A Champion-level anthropomorphic lion-themed Digimon and Ogremon's long-term rival, living on File Island. In Digimon Adventure, Leomon is brainwashed by Devimon, but Tai and Matt free him by using their Digivices. Later, he helps them defeat Devimon. Leomon eventually gains the ability to digivolve into the lion/Smilodon-themed ultimate form SaberLeomon. Though sacrificing himself in defeating MetalEtemon, Leomon is revived at Primary Village following Apocalymon's defeat. In Digimon Adventure tri., Leomon visits the human world, where he is destroyed by Meicoomon, who senses his infection. In the 2020 Adventure series, Leomon was part of the resistance against the Dark Digimon Army and was aided with two sidekicks, Spadamon and Falcomon.
Ogremon (オーガモン, Ōgamon)
Voiced by: Hisao Egawa (Japanese); Beau Billingslea, Bill Butts (2020 reboot) (English)
Leomon's rival and a Champion-level ogre-themed Digimon living on File Island. He is a brutish, aggressive character, but shows a sense of honor and admiration for Leomon. He started off as an evil Digimon who served willingly under Devimon. When Tai found himself back in Japan following Etemon's defeat, he was seen in the Real World just before Tai returned to the DigiWorld. He was later seen in Puppetmons forest where he was injured and Joe and Mimi encountered him while treating his wounds, regardless of his past actions. He joins a group of Digimon to face the Dark Masters and helps defeat MetalEtemon and later Piedmon before becoming a wanderer after Apocalymon's defeat. In Digimon Adventure tri., Ogremon was infected and goes berserk and attacks Mimi and Palmon in the Real World, but Leomon was able to push him back to the Digital World. In the 2020 Adventure series, Ogremon is a servant to Devimon who uses a Coredramon Blue as his steed. He puts up a great battle with Greymon, only to be abruptly interrupted by an arriving MetalTyrannomon. Ogremon manages to be wiped out by MetalTyrannomon, but later survives in the series and becomes the ogre/motorcycle-themed Rebellimon, living in the out lands of the Digital World. He regains the memory of Tai and Agumon's previous battle. He tries to defeat an outlaw named Boltmon, but was easily beaten by him. During Boltmon's rematch with Rebellimon, Cutemon aids him and helps him get his revenge on Boltmon, and succeeds to defeat him.
Frigimon (ユキダルモン, Yukidarumon)
Voiced by: Kentaro Ito (Japanese); Bill Capizzi (English)
A bear/snowman-themed Digimon that Tai and Agumon encounter in an arctic fragment of File Island while possessed by a Black Gear. After being freed, Frigimon helped Tai and Agumon reunite with Matt and Gabumon while helping to subdue Mojyamon. Frigimon was later present when the File Island Digimon helped to build a raft that would help the DigiDestined get to the Server Continent. Mimi and Joe later reunited with Frigimon when he and Meramon agree to help them fight the Dark Masters. In the English dub, he speaks in the style of Jackie Vernon.
Mojyamon (モジャモン, Mojamon)
Voiced by: Yōji Ietomi (Japanese); Joey Camen (English)
A wolf-mouthed Yeti-themed Digimon living on an arctic fragment of File Island who got possessed by a Black Gear. With help from Frigimon, Greymon and Garurumon were able to free Mojyamon from the Black Gear. Mojyamon was later present when the File Island Digimon helped to build a raft that would help the DigiDestined get to the Server Continent.
Centarumon (ケンタルモン, Kentarumon)
Voiced by: Masaki Aizawa (Japanese); Bob Papenbrook (English)
A cybernetic and cyclopic Champion-level centaur-themed Digimon, living in an ancient temple on File Island and knowledgeable of the history of the Digivices. After Izzy and Mimi destroy the Black Gear on him, Centarumon shares his knowledge. Centarumon was among the File Island Digimon that helped to build a raft that would help the DigiDestined get to Server Continent. He later met with Gennai regarding information about Apocalymon.
Elecmon (エレキモン, Erekimon)
Voiced by: Yasuhiro Takato (Japanese); Michael Sorich (English)
A rabbit-like Rookie-level Digimon and caretaker of Primary Village, where all Digimon are born from Digi-Eggs. After the DigiDestined defeat the Dark Masters and Apocalymon, Elecmon returns home.
Whamon (ホエーモン, Hoēmon)
Voiced by: Masafumi Kimura (Japanese); Peter Spellos (English)
A Champion-level sperm whale-themed Digimon first encountered by the DigiDestined after leaving File Island. Controlled by a remaining Black Gear, Whamon swallowed the group, but was set free by Tai's Digivice. Remorseful, Whamon helped the DigiDestined locate the Tags and carried them to the continent of Server. When the DigiDestined returned during the invasion of the Dark Masters, Whamon reappeared to rescue them from MetalSeadramon and his Divermon. Whamon carried the group inside of his own body to safety, only to be attacked by MetalSeadramon. Whamon departed while Zudomon destroyed the Divermon and WarGreymon fought MetalSedramon. When WarGreymon was almost crushed by the Dark Master, Whamon reappeared and rammed MetalSeadramon, saving his friend and enraging MetalSedramon who blasted Whamon through the head. WarGreymon quickly destroyed MetalSedramon, but Whamon was mortally wounded and begged the DigiDestined to save the world with his last words. In Digimon Adventure 02, Whamon was recruited to save most of the DigiDestined from an off-shore oil rig that was under attack by a MegaSedramon. While the original version lists this as a different Whamon that was enlisted, the English dub changed it to the Whamon that the DigiDestined knew.
Piximon (ピッコロモン, Pikkoromon)
Voiced by: Isamu Tanonaka (Japanese); Richard Cansino (English)
Piximon is an Ultimate-level fairy Digimon who resides in an oasis. He trains the DigiDestined to work together, and helps Tai and Agumon face their fears of Digivolving after Tai forced Greymon to digivolve into SkullGreymon. Piximon sacrifices himself to save the DigiDestined from the Dark Masters.
Wizardmon (ウィザーモン, Wizāmon)
Voiced by: Akira Ishida (Japanese); Robert Axelrod (English)
Wizardmon is a Champion-level wizard-themed Digimon and Gatomon's friend who accompanied Myotismon's forces to the Real World. He is killed by Myotismon while protecting Kari and Gatomon from him. In Digimon Adventure 02, Wizardmon appears as a ghost at the Fuji TV Station, telling the DigiDestined a cryptic prophecy concerning Myotismon's return and about Ken's redemption through the power of a Golden Armor Digi-Egg.
Azulongmon (チンロンモン, Chinronmon)
Voiced by: Jūrōta Kosugi (Japanese); David Lodge (English)
Azulongmon, a Mega-level Azure Dragon-like Digimon, is one of the four Digimon Sovereigns and is the ruling guardian of Digital World's Eastern Hemisphere. In Digimon Adventure 02, the Sovereigns were revealed to have been sealed away by the Dark Masters during the events for the first series with the DigiDestined sacrificing their Crest powers. During BlackWarGreymon's assault on the Destiny Stones, Azulongmon was freed by the DigiDestined and defeated BlackWarGreymon. He loaned the DigiDestined two of his DigiCores, allowing the DigiDestined to digivolve their partners past their Champion forms. In Digimon Adventure tri., Azulongmon and the Sovereigns were originally the partner Digimon of the first DigiDestined.
Digitamamon (デジタマモン, Dejitamamon)
Voiced by: Jin Horikawa (Japanese); Derek Stephen Prince (English)
Digitamamon is an Ultimate-level egg-themed Digimon and the owner of a diner where he is served by a Vegiemon and the only currency they accepted was real money. In Digimon Adventure, he forces Joe and Gomamon into working at his diner to pay off the debt they owe him, only to be bribed by DemiDevimon into keeping them in the restaurant. DemiDevimon's sabotages make things difficult for Joe and Matt. Digitamamon is defeated by WereGarurumon while Vegiemon flees. In Digimon Adventure 02, Digitamamon returns where he now has a different restaurant, in which they only accepted DigiDollars. He did get into an argument with Yolei about the currency differences. Digitamamon falls victim to a Dark Spiral that is in his shell, but is freed by Shurimon. He later opens a new Chinese restaurant with a Tapirmon, using the waters of a spring that conceals the last Destiny Stone as the secret ingredient to his popular noodle soup. In the English dub, Digitamamon speaks in the style of Peter Lorre.
Tapirmon (バクモン, Bakumon)
Voiced by: Tanuki Sugino (TV), Kaori Ishihara (tri.) (Japanese); Paul St. Peter (TV), Colleen O'Shaughnessey (tri.) (English)
A Rookie-level Baku Digimon who works at the Chinese Restaurant in Digimon Adventure 02. Another Tapirmon appears in Digimon Adventure tri. as Maki's partner Digimon, able to digivolve into Megadramon (メガドラモン, Megadoramon). He sacrifices himself enable his comrades to defeat the Dark Masters as the Sovereigns, with Maki managing to revive Tapirmon by rebooting Digital World. But the revived Tapirmon has no memory of Maki or their time together as a result.
Gekomon (ゲコモン), Otamamon (オタマモン) and ShogunGekomon (トノサマゲコモン, Tonosamagekomon)
Gekomon: Voiced by: Masami Kikuchi, Hiroaki Hirata, Kōki Miyata, Junko Takeuchi (Japanese); Dan Lorge, Jonathan Fahn, Dave Mallow (English)
Otamamon: Voiced by: (Japanese); Dorothy Elias-Fahn, Mari Devon, Wendee Lee (English)
ShogunGekomon: Voiced by: Ginzō Matsuo (Japanese); Bob Papenbrook (English)
A group of amphibian Digimon that live in a castle, the Rookie-level tadpole-themed Otamamon and Champion-level frog-themed Gekomon serve Ultimate-level bullfrog/toad-themed ShogunGekomon. After being awoken by Mimi, ShogunGekomon went on a rampage until MetalGreymon's Giga Blaster sent him back to sleep. Following the formation of Spiral Mountain, many Otamamon and Gekomon lost their home and ShogunGekomon when it was destroyed and ultimately aided the DigiDestined in their final battle with Piedmon. In Digimon Adventure 02, ShogunGekomon falls under the influence of a Dark Spiral before he was freed after being tricked into destroying a local Control Spire.
Sukamon (スカモン) and Chuumon (チューモ, Chūmon)
Sukamon: Voiced by: Motoko Kumai (Japanese); Dave Mallow (English)
Chuumon: Voiced by: Kappei Yamaguchi (Japanese); Dave Mallow, Doug Erholtz (English)
A pair composed by the champion-level poop-themed Digimon Sukamon and the rookie-level rat-like Digimon Chuumon, both relatively harmless despite being obnoxious. Mimi first encountered the duo while separated from the others, with the two quickly developing a crush on her. They later reappeared as recruits for Myotismon's army, but quickly abandoned it. When the Dark Masters created Spiral Mountain, Sukamon fell to his death in a deep crevice with Chuumon informing the DigiDestined of what occurred in their absence. Chuumon then later sacrifices himself to save a devastated Mimi from Piedmon's knife. The two were eventually reborn and resurfaced in Digimon Adventure 02 after Shurimon freed Digitamamon from a Dark Spiral. The two once again attempted to get Mimi to go out with them before she punches them clear across a lake in response.
Hackmon (ハックモン, Hakkumon)
Voiced by: Shunsuke Takeuchi (Japanese); Aaron LaPlante (English)
A rookie-level armored dragon-like Digimon who serves as Homeostasis' messenger and observer, able to warp-digivolve into the exalted knight Jesmon (ジエスモン, Jiesumon). While considering Homeostasis' orders absolute, he is moved enough by the resolve of the DigiDestined that he helps them in preventing Ordinemon from escaping into the Digital World while extracting Gatomon from the monster.

=== 2020 characters ===
El Doradimon (エルドラディモン, Erudoradimon)
A gigantic tortoise/El Dorado-themed Digimon who holds a massive city on his back. After T.K. frees it from the miasma swamp, it falls from Cloud Continent and into the ocean where it continues to protect the Digimon from threats. Later on in the series, ElDradimon returns to the Cloud Continent with the help of T.K., MagnaAngemon, Gravimon, Leomon, and the Digimon who lost their homes.
Lopmon (ロップモン, Roppumon)
Voiced by: Chinami Nishimura (Japanese)
A brown lop-eared rabbit Digimon that was a reincarnation of Cherubimon from the Ancient Dark Digimon war.
Komondomon (コモンドモン)
Voiced by: Daisuke Yokohama (Japanese)
A vehicle Digimon that resembles a giant Komondor wearing a rusty cybernetic helmet. It becomes a supporting ally to the DigiDestined and is used as transportation across the Digital World. Several other Komondomon appear and wear grey helmets.
Burgermon (バーガモン, Bāgamon)
A hamburger-themed Digimon who runs a burger-themed fast-food restaurant who serves burgers and fries to hungry travelers.
Muchomon
A tropical penguin-like Digimon that resembles a recolored Penguinmon. He lived on a gigantic Digimon named Petaldramon along with two Puwamon. After Petaldramon's noble sacrifice to defeat Entmon, Muchomon and the two Puwamon had a new grassy home to live in.
Junkmon
A beaver/robot-like Puppet Digimon that is a constructor. He became good friends with Sora and Biyomon when they helped him out with construction. He became injured during the event of Phoenixmon stopping a volcano from erupting, and was taken to ShogunGekomon's area to heal.
BanchoMamemon
Voiced by: Hideo Ishikawa (Japanese), Landon McDonald (English)
The Mega-level leader of the Mamemon clan who was a student of Babamon's school until he became a juvenile delinquent and attacked the school with his gang of Mamemon and BigMamemon. After Mimi and Palmon defeat him in a duel, BanchoMamemon reforms and rejoins the school to earn his degree. By the end of the series, BanchoMamemon successfully graduated from Babamon's school and received his diploma.
Strabimon
Voiced by: Hiroshi Kamiya (Japanese version)
A young anthropomorphic wolf Digimon who lives in Mojyamon's village, who is under attack by a ghostly warrior named Zanbamon. After witnessing Grizzlymon and Apemon getting slaughtered by Zanbamon, he cowers in shame. After Matt and CresGarurumon defeat Zanbamon for good, Strabimon promises to train hard and protect his Village against incoming threats.

=== Human World ===
Susumu Kamiya (八神進, Yagami Susumu) and Yuko Kamiya (八神裕子, Yagami Yuko)
Susumu: Voiced by: Hiroya Ishimaru (original film), Susumu Chiba (Adventure), (Japanese); Doug Erholtz (English)
Yuko: Voiced by: Yoshiko Sakakibara (original film), Yuko Mizutani (Adventure & 02), Atori Shigematsu (tri.) (Japanese); Dorothy Elias-Fahn (English)
Susumu and Yuko are Tai and Kari's parents. They are named after their voice actors in the original television series, Susumu Chiba and Yuko Mizutani.
Hiroaki Ishida (石田裕明, Ishida Hiroaki)
Voiced by: Hiroaki Hirata (Japanese); David Greenlee (English)
Hiroaki is Matt and T.K.'s father. He works as a reporter at Fuji TV and tends to be a workaholic, but has a nice demeanor. He finds out about his sons' connection to the Digimon during Myotismon's invasion. He is named after his voice actor in the television series, Hiroaki Hirata.
Nancy Takaishi (高石 奈津子, Takaishi Natsuko)
Voiced by: Chika Sakamoto (Japanese); Barbara Goodson (English)
Nancy is Matt and T.K.'s mother and a newspaper reporter. In Digimon Adventure 02, she moved to Odaiba.
Kinu (キヌ)
Voiced by: Masami Kikuchi (Japanese); Philece Sampler (English)
Kinu is Matt and T.K.'s grandmother.
Michel Takaishi (高石 ミッシェル, Takaishi Missheru)
Voiced by: Hiroaki Hirata (Japanese); David Lodge (English)
Michel is Matt and T.K.'s grandfather and notes that his wife plans on re-roofing their home on Christmas.
Haruhiko Takenouchi (武之内春彦, Takenouchi Haruhiko)
Voiced by: Toshiyuki Morikawa (Japanese); R. Martin Klein (English)
Haruhiko is Sora's father and an anthropology professor at Kyoto University. He researches information on the Digital World.
Toshiko Takenouchi (武之内淑子, Takenouchi Toshiko)
Voiced by: Toshiko Fujita (Japanese); Elizabeth Rice (English)
Toshiko is Sora's mother, who urged Sora to quit soccer and do flower arranging after she suffered an injury. This initially causes a rift between the two until Sora realizes her mother truly loves her. She is named after her voice actress in the television series, Toshiko Fujita.
Masami Izumi (泉政実, Izumi Masami) and Kae Izumi (泉佳江, Izumi Kae)
Masami: Voiced by: Masami Kikuchi (Japanese); Jeff Nimoy (English)
Kae: Voiced by: Kae Araki (Japanese); Mari Devon (English)
Masami and Kae are Izzy's adoptive parents. After Masami and Kae's biological son died, they adopted Izzy, who also lost his biological parents to a car accident at a young age. When Izzy overheard them discussing this as a child, he felt distant from them until he learnt to understand that they truly love him like their own son. They are named after their voice actors in the television series, Masami Kikuchi and Kae Araki.
Keisuke Tachikawa (太刀川 ケースケ, Tachikawa Kēsuke)
Voiced by: Takahiro Sakurai (Japanese); Dan Woren (English)
Keisuke is Mimi's father.
Satoe Tachikawa (太刀川 サトエ, Tachikawa Satoe)
Voiced by: Yuka Tokumitsu (Japanese); Julie Maddalena (English)
Satoe is Mimi's mother.
Jim Kido
Voiced by: Masami Kikuchi (Japanese); Doug Erholtz (English)
Jim is Joe's older brother. In the original Japanese version, Joe had two older brothers, but in the English dub, both brothers were made into a single character, although they're both shown in "A Million Points of Light". Joe's first older brother, introduced in Digimon Adventure, is Shin Kido (城戸シン, Kido Shin), who helps him out during VenomMyotismon's attack after evading capture at the hands of Myotismon's Bakemon. In Digimon Adventure 02, Joe also had another older brother, Shu Kido (城戸シュウ, Kido Shū), who is the eldest in the family and is also a college student working with Sora's father, Haruhiko Takenouchi. In the drama CD Michi e no Armor Shinka, they go on a date with June and Yolei's two older sisters and eventually get their own Digimon in the drama CD Digimon Adventure: Original Stories.
June Motomiya (本宮ジュン, Motomiya Jun)
Voiced by: Kazusa Murai (Japanese); Peggy O'Neal (English)
June is Davis' older sister and a fan of the Teen-Age Wolves. She had a one-sided crush on Matt, but stopped pursuing him when she witnessed him saving Sora after Digimon crashed the Teen-Age Wolves' concert. June starts a relationship with Jim. She eventually gets her own Digimon in the drama CD Digimon Adventure: Original Stories.
Chikara Hida (火田主税, Hida Chikara)
Voiced by: Kousei Tomita (Japanese); Dan Lorge (English)
Chikara is Cody's paternal grandfather living with the boy and his daughter-in-law Fumiko. He trains Cody in kendo, and serves as a father figure in place of his son and police officer Hiroki.
Fumiko Hida (火田 富美子, Hida Fumiko)
Voiced by: Keiko Koumyouji (Japanese); Mary Elizabeth McGlynn (English)
Fumiko is Cody's widowed mother she flew with her father-in-law and son to London to retrieve Hiroki's remains.
Sam Ichijoji (一乗寺治, Ichijōji Osamu)
Voiced by: Romi Park (Japanese); Jason Spisak (English)
Sam is Ken's late older brother and a child prodigy who died in a car accident, his death having a profound effect on Ken as the Dark Spore emulated his desire to be like his brother with his Digimon Emperor attire modeled after Sam.
Mochizuki Family
Professor Mochizuki: Voiced by: Yutaka Aoyama (Japanese); Aaron LaPlante (English)
Meiko's Mother: Voiced by: Hitomi Yoshida (Japanese); Colleen O'Shaughnessey (English)
Meiko's father is a professor, who had a failed experiment on Meicoomon. The couple moved to Odaiba afterwards with Meiko afterwards.
Daigo Nishijima (西島 大吾, Nishijima Daigo)
Voiced by: Daisuke Namikawa (Japanese); Doug Erholtz (English)
A main character in the Digimon Adventure tri. films. Daigo is Tai's substitute teacher and a government agent from the Incorporate Administrative Agency. He is described as warm, friendly, compassionate, and light-hearted. Loss revealed that Daigo was the leader of the original DigiDestined predating Tai's group, partnered with the Digimon that would become Baihumon. After falling off a canyon cliff and waking up in an underground facility, a mortally wounded Daigo dies in an explosion after sending Tai, Davis, Yolei, Cody and Ken back to the Real World.
Kyotaro Yamada (山田 京太郎, Yamada Kyōtarō)
Voiced by: Daisuke Ono (Japanese); Kaiji Tang (English)
A main character in Digimon Adventure: Last Evolution Kizuna. He is an intimidating FBI agent who is investigating Menoa Bellucci by posing as her assistant under an alias of Kyotaro Imura (井村 京太郎, Imura Kyōtarō).

==== International DigiDestined ====
The following are the international DigiDestined that debut in Digimon Adventure 02:

Michael (マイケル, Maikeru)
Voiced by: Konami Yoshida (Japanese); Tom Gibis (English)
Michael is a DigiDestined residing in New York and a friend of Mimi's. In 1999, Michael witnessed Gorillamon climbing the Empire State Building, leading him to become a DigiDestined and partner with Betamon. When Digimon started appearing around the world, Michael helped Davis and Mimi round up the ones in New York and battle a berserk Cherrymon.
Phil (サム, Samu)
Voiced by: Kae Araki (Japanese); Brianne Siddall, Doug Erholtz (ep. 50) (English)
A dark-skinned American DigiDestined. He and his partner Flarerizamon were herding some Digimon to Central Park until a Cherrymon went berserk and attacked the Christmas tree at Rockefeller Center. Phil helped Davis, Mimi, Michael, and the other American DigiDestined in subduing Cherrymon.
Tatum (テータム, Tētamu)
Voiced by: Umi Tenjin
A female American DigiDestined partnered with Airdramon who helped in herding some Digimon to Central Park where she lured a ShogunGekomon away from Niagara Falls.
Maria (マリア)
Voiced by: Yuka Tokumitsu (Japanese); Dorothy Elias-Fahn (English)
A female American DigiDestined partnered with Centarumon who helped in herding some Digimon to Central Park. She helped Davis and the other American DigiDestined in subduing Cherrymon.
Steve (スティーブ, Sutību)
Voiced by: Takahiro Sakurai (Japanese); Michael Sorich (English)
An American DigiDestined partnered with Frigimon who helped in herding some Digimon to Central Park. He helped Davis and the other American DigiDestined in subduing Cherrymon.
Lou (ルー, Rū)
Voiced by: Kae Araki (Japanese); Dan Lorge (English)
A Native American DigiDestined partnered with Tortomon who helped in herding some Digimon to Central Park. He helped Davis and the other American DigiDestined in subduing Cherrymon.
Poi Brothers (ポイ三兄弟, Poi sankyōdai)
Eldest Poi Brother Voiced by: Youto Kazama (Japanese); Kirk Thornton (English)
Middle Poi Brother Voiced by: Junko Noda (Japanese); Jonathan Fahn (English)
Youngest Poi Brother Voiced by: Reiko Kiuchi (Japanese); Dan Lorge (English)
Three Chinese DigiDestined brothers who are partnered with three Syakomon. They took a liking to Kari.
Chinese: 月紅; pinyin: Yuè Hóng
Voiced by: Junko Takeuchi (Japanese); Tifanie Christun (English)
A Chinese DigiDestined who is partnered with Apemon.
Dien (ディエン, Dien)
A Vietnamese DigiDestined who is partnered with Gorillamon.
Mina (ミーナ, Mīna)
Voiced by: Ai Maeda (Japanese); Peggy O'Neal (English)
An Indian DigiDestined who is partnered with Meramon. Kari, Izzy, and one of the Poi Brothers had to help her find a way to get the Digimon with her across the India/China border.
Derek (ディンゴ, Dingo)
Voiced by: Chika Sakamoto (Japanese); Derek Stephen Prince (English)
An Australian DigiDestined partnered with Crabmon that Joe and Cody helped out starting with driving off his Ebidramon, Gesomon, and Shellmon pursuers and fighting a Scorpiomon that was guarding a Control Spire.
Catherine Deneuve (カトリーヌ・ドヌーブ, Katorīnu Donūbu)
Voiced by: Megumi Urawa (Japanese); Philece Sampler (English)
A French DigiDestined partnered with Crabmon that Tai, T.K., and T.K.'s grandfather Michel had to rescue from the Mamemon Brothers and Giromon.
Rosa (チチョス, Chichos)
Voiced by: Rio Natsuki (Japanese); Dorothy Elias-Fahn (English)
A female Mexican DigiDestined who is partnered with Gotsumon. She befriended Ken and helped him and Matt fight Minotarumon and Dokugumon.
Anna (アンナ)
Voiced by: Reiko Kiuchi (Japanese); Philece Sampler (English)
A female Russian DigiDestined who is partnered with Unimon.
Sonya (ローラ, Rōra)
Voiced by: Romi Park (Japanese); Laura Summer (English)
A female Russian DigiDestined who is partnered with Snimon.
Yuri (ユーリ, Yūri)
Voiced by: Naozumi Takahashi (Japanese); Doug Erholtz (English)
A Russian DigiDestined.

===== International Partner Digimon =====
Betamon (ベタモン)
Voiced by: Dina Sherman (Betamon), Dan Lorge (Seadramon)
A frog-like Digimon that is Michael's partner. He can Digivolve into the sea dragon-type Seadramon (シードラモン, Shīdoramon).
Flarerizamon (フレアリザモン, Furearizamon)
Voiced by: Takahiro Sakurai (Japanese); Lex Lang (English)
A fiery lizard-themed Digimon who is Phil's partner.
Airdramon (エアドラモン, Eadoramon)
Voiced by: Lex Lang
An Amphiptere-themed Digimon who is Tatum's partner.
Centarumon (ケンタルモン, Kentarumon)
Voiced by: Dan Lorge
A cyborg centaur-themed Digimon who is Maria's partner.
Frigimon (ユキダルモン, Yukidarumon)
Voiced by: Bill Capizzi
A snowman/bear-themed Digimon who is partnered with Lou. Other unrelated Frigimon were shown to be partnered with some unnamed Siberian DigiDestined.
Tortomon (トータモン, Tōtamon)
Voiced by: Bob Papenbrook
A tortoise-themed Digimon who is partnered with Lou.
Syakomon (シャコモン, Shakomon)
Voiced by: Konami Yoshida, Yuka Tokumitsu, Takahiro Sakurai (Syakomon and Octomon) (Japanese); Mary Elizabeth McGlynn (Syakomon), Lex Lang, Joseph Pilato, Kirk Thornton (Octomon) (English)
Three clam-themed Digimon who are partnered with the Poi Brothers. They can digivolve into the octopus-themed Octomon (オクタモン, Okutamon). One of the Octomon came in handy in helping the Digimon trying to cross into China by leaving a message on a canyon wall at the India/China border stating that they come in peace.
Apemon (ハヌモン, Hanumon)
An ape-themed Digimon who is partnered with Yue Hong.
Gorillamon (ゴリモン, Gorimon)
A gorilla-themed Digimon who is partnered with Dien.
Meramon (メラモン)
Voiced by: Lex Lang
Crabmon (ガニモン, Ganimon)
Voiced by: Toshihiko Fujita (Japanese); Joe Ochman (both Crabmon and Coelamon) (English)
A crab-themed Digimon who is Derek's partner. He can Digivolve into the coelacanth-themed Digimon Coelamon (シーラモン, Shīramon).
Floramon (フローラモン, Furōramon)
Voiced by: Mary Elizabeth McGlynn (Floramon and Kiwimon)
A plant/reptile-themed Digimon who is Catherine's partner. She can Digivolve into Kiwimon (キウイモン, Kiuimon).
Gotsumon (ゴツモン, Gotsumon)
Voiced by: Reiko Kiuchi (Japanese); Dave Mallow (Gotsumon), Richard Epcar (Monochromon) (English)
A rock Digimon who is Rosa's partner. He can Digivolve into Monochromon.
Unimon (ユニモン, Yunimon)
Voiced by: Mayumi Yamaguchi (Japanese); Tom Gibis (English)
A winged unicorn-themed Digimon who is Anna's partner.
Snimon (スナイモン, Sunaimon)
Voiced by: Hiroaki Hirata (Japanese); Dan Lorge (English)
A mantis-themed Digimon who is partnered with Sonya.
Kuwagamon (クワガーモン, Kuwagāmon)
Voiced by: Youto Kazama (Japanese); Michael Sorich (English)
A stag beetle-themed Digimon who is partnered with Yuri.
