= SAE Online =

German unaccredited higher education company

- Former names: SAE Graduate College
- Type: Unaccredited
- Parent institution: SAE Institute
- Chief executive: Peter Pulfer
- Academic staff: 0
- Location: Fürstenfeldbruck, Germany; 48.161193°N 11.232134°E
- Language: English and German
- Website: www.saeonline.com

SAE Online, formerly SAE Graduate college or International Graduate College, is the trade name of SAE Alumni GmbH, an unaccredited, distance learning, proprietary, for-profit higher education company located in Fürstenfeldbruck, Germany. It provides post graduate courses in Creative Media Industries, as well as several other professional skills courses (short courses) taught by non-academic staff.

The university has no campus and no professors. Candidates for a degree are usually required to discuss a project. The school issues unaccredited Master's and even PhDs («Online Graduate College provides post graduate courses from Masters to Doctorate»).

== See also ==
- Educational accreditation
- SAE Institute
