= Sae Tachikawa =

Japanese educator

Sae Tachikawa (立川 サエ, Tachikawa Sae; August 9, 1889 – February 14, 1990) was a Japanese educator in Hawaii. She founded the Tachikawa Japanese Language School in Honolulu, Hawaii.

== Early life and education ==
Tachikawa was born in Fukuoka, Japan in 1889. She was an orphan, and was raised by her grandparents. As a child she took tea ceremony classes, and fell in love with Japanese culture. She studied at the Kurumei Jogakko, then earned a teaching certificate from the Tokyo Bijutsu Senmon Gakko. After graduation, she returned to Fukuoka to become a teacher. She met Ryurei Kimura, who arranged a picture bride marriage for her with Shinkyo Tachikawa, a missionary in ʻŌʻōkala, Hawaii. He was also the principal and only teacher at a Japanese language school.

== Career ==
Soon after Tachikawa settled in Hawaii in 1911, the couple were transferred to Hakalau, where Shinkyo was promoted to the head of the Hawaii Jodo mission. While they initially taught Japanese classes together, Tachikawa took on more of the workload as her husband's administrative burdens grew. She taught at the Hawaii Jogakko, which was attached to the temple. She was also the dorm mother, preparing meals and taking care of the boarding students. The school and the dormitory steadily grew during her tenure, and a second building was built.

Shinkyo grew ill, and returned to Japan for treatment in 1918. He died after returning to Hawaii in 1925. After his death, Tachikawa took his ashes to Japan with two of their four children. When she returned to Hawaii, Tachikawa decided to start her own, all-girls school called the Tachikawa Jogakko in Honolulu. She wanted to mold her students into yamato nadeshiko, ideal Japanese women.

Though the school closed during World War II, it reopened in 1949 as a co-educational Japanese language school. It grew to 650 students at its peak. She and the teachers she employed taught Japanese language, embroidery, koto, ikebana, Omotesenke tea ceremony, and other Japanese arts and cultural practices.

Tachikawa was commended by Eisaku Sato in 1967, then awarded the Order of the Sacred Treasure in 1968. She retired in 1972. Tachikawa died on February 14, 1990.
