= Digimon World =

1999 video game

- North American boxart
- Developer: BEC (Note: Additional work by Flying Tiger Development)
- Publisher: Bandai
- Series: Digimon
- Platforms: PlayStation, Microsoft Windows
- Release: PlayStation: JP: January 28, 1999; NA: May 23, 2000; EU: July 6, 2001; Microsoft Windows: KOR: April 27, 2002
- Genres: Role-playing, digital pet
- Mode: Single-player

Digimon World (Japanese: デジモンワールド, Hepburn: Dejimon Wārudo) is a role-playing video game developed by BEC and published by Bandai for the PlayStation. It's the first game in the Digimon World series, followed by various sequels released for the PlayStation and other platforms. The story focuses on a human brought to File City on File Island by Jijimon to save the island. Digimon have been losing their memories and becoming feral and the city has fallen into disarray. The goal of the player, who is represented by an unnamed young boy, is to save the island by helping Digimon recover their memory and return to the city.

== Gameplay ==
Greymon (right) and MetalGreymon (left) battle as the player character (top middle) watches on, with menu and health bar visible at the top of the screen.

The gameplay revolves around raising a single Digimon from its egg form, hatching into a Fresh, up through In-Training, Rookie, Champion, and with work, Ultimate. A Digimon partner will "fade away" with age, and return to an egg eventually, so the player has to raise it again.

To raise a Digimon partner, the player must train it, feed it, let it rest, and take it to bathrooms. Training is done to increase the Digimon's stats to make it stronger in battle. Raising a Digimon well will result in the Rookie Digimon "Digivolving" into a Champion form with better stats, while not training or raising it well will cause it to Digivolve into Numemon, a Champion Digimon with inferior stats and skills.

The other main part of gameplay is battle. The player's partner Digimon fight the Digimon that have become aggressive due to a crisis on File Island, and some will calm down and work at the city when defeated. Partner Digimon begin the game with a few basic skills, but acquire more as they progress in levels through the game. The player cannot control the actions of an unintelligent Digimon, but as it gets smarter more control over its actions is given to the player.

More Digimon working for the city will make training and various other aspects of the game much easier. Many will open shops and even sell items, some which will open playable mini-games for gaining rewards and items.

== Plot ==
The game revolves around a young boy (the player can name the protagonist in the beginning of the game), the protagonist, who is drawn into the Digital World through his V-Pet device. Jijimon greets and asks him a few questions, the answers to which determine whether he begins with an Agumon or Gabumon. His goal is to travel around File Island, locating all of the resident Digimon of File City who have turned feral and bring them back, raising Digimon partners in the process. Throughout the game, the protagonist learns that once humans have visited the Digital World in hopes to seize control and enslave the Digimon inside. According to one encounter with Andromon, it is mentioned that time moves very slow for humans (which explains why the protagonist doesn't need to eat or sleep), and also explained that Humans and Digimon were in a war that banished the humans but believed to have found a place to hide. (Possibly Mount Infinity).He must train his Digimon and battle his way through all of Digimon World until the once sparsely populated city is flourishing with different Digimon from all of Digimon World. He must eventually go to Infinity Mountain (the final location) to confront the antagonist, Analogman, and the mega Machinedramon, and save the Digital World from destruction.

== Development ==
Developer and publisher Bandai used an extensive marketing campaign to compete with Nintendo's Pokémon media franchise, specifically the video games Pokémon Red and Blue. A promotional Digimon trading card was offered to the first 100,000 North American customers to purchase the game. The game was officially announced in conjunction with Digimon World 2 in May 2000, before either's release. Flying Tiger Development localized the game for North American audiences; their satisfactory work would lead to them being contracted by Namco to develop Time Crisis: Project Titan for the PlayStation.

Infogrames' European operations handled distribution of the game in Europe and Australia.

== Reception ==
Reception

Aggregate score
Aggregator	Score
GameRankings	52.55%

Review scores
Publication	Score
Famitsu	23/40
GamePro	2/5
GameSpot	5.1/10
IGN	5.8/10

Digimon World received a 23 out of 40 total score from editors of Japanese Weekly Famitsu magazine, and went on to sell approximately 250,000 copies in the region by February 2000.

The English version sold enough copies to qualify as a Greatest Hits title in North America, and Platinum in Europe, but received mixed reviews from critics, earning a 52.55% average on GameRankings. GamePro magazine criticized the game's "tinny" music and sound effects, as well as the largely uncontrollable nature of its combat system, recommending it only for "a hardcore Digimon fan". GameSpot's Miguel Lopez likewise stated that "Digimon World isn't for everyone – only dedicated Digimon fans or fans of the monster-raising genre need apply," but found the graphics pleasing, declaring that "despite its disassociating play focus, no one can deny that Digimon World is a nice-looking game." IGN's David Zdyrko offered a similar opinion on the game's visuals, stating "There's nothing revolutionary being done here [...] but it still can be classified as a good looking videogame," but found the game's battle system unfulfilling.

== Legacy ==
The game was followed by various sequels released for the PlayStation and other platforms, though they do not retain all the gameplay elements found in the original. In addition, despite being localized as such in Western markets, Digimon World DS, Digimon World Dawn and Dusk, Digimon World Data Squad, and Digimon World Championship have no relation to the series.

Digimon World Re:Digitize was first announced in July 2011, in an issue of V-Jump, as the first Digimon game for the PlayStation Portable. The game was announced to be developed by Japanese video game developer Tri-Crescendo, The game's premise was to call back to the first instalment's gameplay.

Digimon World: Next Order was announced in the July 2015 issue of V-Jump. It was originally released for PlayStation Vita and published by Bandai Namco. A trailer was released on July 31 and featured clips from the original Digimon World before showcasing its gameplay. It is based on the concept of an "evolving world," and like Re:Digitize, the player takes control of the main character, who travels alongside two Digimon partners. The first partners to be revealed were Agumon and Gabumon. It was released in Japan on 17 March 2016.
