= Digimon World 3 =

2002 video game

- North American boxart
- Developers: BEC; Boom Corp.
- Publisher: Bandai
- Director: Takao Nagasawa
- Producer: Atsushi Minowa
- Artist: Yasuo Nozoe
- Writer: Shinya Murakami
- Composer: Satoshi Ishikawa
- Series: Digimon
- Platform: PlayStation
- Release: NA: June 6, 2002; JP: July 4, 2002; EU: November 29, 2002
- Genre: Role-playing

Digimon World 3 (デジモンワールド3 新たなる冒険の扉, Dejimon Wārudo 3 Aratanaru Bōken no Tobira; Digimon World 3: The Door of a New Adventure), also known as Digimon World 2003 in Europe and Australia, is a role-playing video game for the PlayStation developed by BEC and Boom Corp, and published by Bandai. It is the third installment in the Digimon World series and it was first released in June 2002 in North America and then in July 2002 in Japan and November 2002 in Europe. The game tells the story of Junior, who begins playing an MMORPG called "Digimon Online" with his friends, but when terrorists attack, Junior and the other players are trapped within the game and must find a way out using his Digimon partners.

== Gameplay ==
Digimon World 3 differs from its predecessors as the system has been changed to be more like Japanese Role-Playing games of the time such as Final Fantasy VII or Legend of Dragoon. The game has two primary modes in which it is played: an overworld map and the battle screens. The player character navigates through a 3D world map using sprites that represent the playable character and the monsters that make up his party. In battle, players control the parties with up to three monsters in turn-based style battles where the player's party fights one-on-one against the opposing party, with the option to switch or perform certain actions with the party members.

== Plot ==
Junior prepares to meet his 3 Digimon: Kumamon, Guilmon, and Patamon (from left to right). Digimon World 3's environments are science fiction-themed and viewed from an isometric perspective.

Junior, and his friends Ivy and Teddy, log into "Digimon Online", where Ivy renames herself "Kail". Soon after Junior arrives, the players are trapped in the game by an error in the system. MAGAMI's "Game Master" publicly assures the players that the situation is under control, and blames the incident on the hacker, Lucky Mouse. Junior proceeds with his adventure as normal and travels to the A.o.A. controlled West Sector, and after defeating the real leader, travels to a secret base of Lucky Mouse, who reveals himself to be Kail's long-lost brother and an agent working against the A.o.A., Kurt, who reveals that MAGAMI is a front for the A.o.A., but soon the A.o.A. arrive and threaten to turn Kail into Oinkmon, if Kurt doesn't give the Vemmon Digi-Egg to the A.o.A. This results in Kurt being turned into Oinkmon and the Vemmon Digi-Egg stolen. Junior leads an attack on the Admin Center, which results in the Game Master being defeated and interrogated. Junior uses a network break to transport himself to the Amaterasu Server, where he defeats two of the A.o.A.'s chiefs and learns more about their plans. He returns to Asuka, defeats the fourth leader, and uses an emergency teleport system to reach MAGASTA, but is unable to prevent the Juggernaut from being unleashed. The Juggernaut is then used by Vemmon to digivolve to Destromon, which also allows it to manifest in the real world- thus becoming a very real threat to humans.

Junior returns to the Amaterasu Server to defeat the final two chiefs, and gains access to Amaterasu City. He leads a fresh attack on the Amaterasu Admin Center, leading to the MAGAMI President being defeated. Junior then uses the central computer to destroy Destromon, before returning to Asuka to ask Airdramon to help him in lifting the virus which is affecting most of the players by transforming them into Oinkmon. Before long, the Oinkmon virus returns and strikes most of the players, with only Junior and Kail surviving untouched. Vemmon had used the beam containing the Oinkmon virus and shot the beam through all servers. Junior then goes into the admin center, and in the Master Room, Junior is challenged by an entity calling himself Lord Megadeath. Junior then travels to a military satellite, Gunslinger, to challenge Lord Megadeath. Once close to the control room, Junior battles Armaggeddemon, and defeats it. He then reaches the control room, and battles Lord Megadeath. Lord Megadeath is defeated, but succeeds in his project of creating Snatchmon, by combining four Vemmon. Snatchmon absorbs Lord Megadeath, challenges the player, and merges with the Gunslinger to become Galacticmon- its ultimate goal being to merge with the Earth to become an unimaginably powerful Gaiamon. Junior defeats him, and Galacticmon's satellite body falls to Earth, burning up into a meteor shower in the atmosphere.

Three months later, Junior returns to the Amaterasu Server, where, as is revealed in the PAL and Japanese versions of the game (i.e. in Digimon World 2003), four new Server Leaders have been established and Kurt is the new World Champion.

=== Playable Digimon ===
Rookie Digimon

While only three Rookie Digimon may be chosen in the beginning of the game, rest of the Rookie Digimon may be obtained later. Veemon is the only Rookie Digimon that is not available from the beginning of the game and can only be obtained later in the game.

- Agumon (available from Powerful pack)
- Bearmon (listed as Kumamon; available from Maniac pack)
- Guilmon (available from Maniac pack)
- Kotemon (available from Balanced pack)
- Monmon (available from Powerful pack)
- Patamon (available from Balanced pack / Maniac pack)
- Renamon (available from Balanced pack / Powerful pack)
- Veemon (unlockable)
Champion Digimon
- Angemon
- Devimon
- Dinohyumon
- ExVeemon
- Greymon
- Grizzlymon (listed as Grizzmon)
- Growlmon
- Hookmon
- Kabuterimon
- Kyubimon
- Stingmon
Ultimate Digimon
- Angewomon
- Armormon
- Digitamamon
- GrapLeomon
- Kyukimon
- MagnaAngemon
- MetalGreymon
- MetalMamemon
- Myotismon
- Paildramon
- SkullGreymon
- Taomon
- WarGrowlmon
Mega Digimon
- Beelzemon
- BlackWarGreymon
- Cannondramon
- Diaboromon
- Gallantmon
- GranKuwagamon
- Hououmon (listed as Phoenixmon)
- Imperialdramon Dragon Mode
- Imperialdramon Fighter Mode
- Imperialdramon Paladin Mode
- Marsmon
- MegaGargomon
- MaloMyotismon
- MetalGarurumon
- Omnimon
- Rosemon
- Sakuyamon
- Seraphimon
- SlashAngemon (listed as GuardiAngemon)
- WarGreymon
DNA Digivolution exclusive Digimon
- Agunimon
- AncientGreymon
- KendoGarurumon (listed as BladeGarurumon)

=== Enemy Digimon ===
Rookie Digimon
- Betamon
- DemiDevimon
- Gizamon
- Goburimon
- Hagurumon
- Kunemon
- Tapirmon
- Vemmon
Champion Digimon
- Airdramon
- Apemon
- Bakemon
- Clockmon
- Coelamon
- Devidramon
- Dokugumon
- Dolphmon
- Drimogemon
- Flymon
- Fugamon
- Gekomon
- Gesomon
- Guardromon
- Kiwimon
- Kokatorimon
- Kurisarimon
- Kuwagamon
- Meramon
- Minotarumon
- Musyamon
- Numemon
- Octomon
- Ogremon
- RedVegiemon
- Roachmon
- Seadramon
- Shellmon
- Snimon
- Sukamon
- Tankmon
- Tuskmon
- Tyrannomon
- Vegiemon
- Vilemon
- Woodmon
- Yanmamon
Ultimate Digimon
- Andromon
- Antylamon
- Arukenimon
- BlackKingNumemon
- BlackWarGrowlmon
- Blossomon
- BlueMeramon
- Brachiomon
- Bulbmon
- Datamon
- Destromon
- Divermon
- Dragomon
- Etemon
- Garbagemon
- Giromon
- Infermon
- Kimeramon
- Knightmon
- LadyDevimon
- Mamemon
- Mammothmon
- MarineDevimon
- MasterTyrannomon
- Megadramon
- MegaSeadramon
- MetalTyrannomon
- Minotarumon
- Mummymon
- Okuwamon
- Persiamon
- Phantomon
- Scorpiomon
- ShogunGekomon
- SkullMeramon
- SkullSatamon
- Triceramon
- Vademon
- WaruMonzaemon
- Whamon
Mega Digimon
- Apokarimon
- Armageddemon
- BlackImperialdramon
- BlackMegaGargomon
- BlackSeraphimon
- BlackWarGreymon
- Boltmon
- Daemon (listed as Creepymon)
- Fuujinmon
- Galacticmon
- Ghoulmon
- Gryphonmon
- HerculesKabuterimon
- HiAndromon
- KingEtemon
- Machinedramon
- MetalEtemon
- MetalSeadramon
- Pharaohmon
- Piedmon
- Pukumon
- Puppetmon
- Raijinmon
- SkullMammothmon
- Suijinmon
- Valkyrimon
- VenomMyotismon
- Vikemon
- Zanbamon
Armor Digimon
- Baronmon
- Gargoylemon
- Lynxmon
- Maildramon
- Quetzalmon
- Shadramon
- Tylomon
Other Digimon
- Cardmon

== Development ==
Digimon World 3 was developed by Bandai Entertainment Company and Boom Corporation. Bandai showcased the game at the 2002 Electronic Entertainment Expo in Los Angeles, where it was playable at several booths. Its music was composed by Satoshi Ishikawa, who had previously created the soundtracks for Digimon World 2 and Digimon Digital Card Battle. The game's Japanese theme song is "Miracle Maker", performed by Spirit of Adventure, a group composed of Digimon anime theme song performers Kōji Wada, AiM, and Takayoshi Tanimoto. It was released as a single on February 5, 2003, alongside "The Last Element", an insert song from the anime Digimon Frontier, by NEC Interchannel Records.

== Reception ==
Reception

Aggregate score
Aggregator	Score
Metacritic	47/100

Review scores
Publication	Score
Consoles +	84%
Electronic Gaming Monthly	4/10 (Note: Two critics of Electronic Gaming Monthly gave the game each a score of 3/10, and the other gave it 6/10.)
Famitsu	27/40
GameSpot	4.9/10
GameZone	6.9/10
Jeuxvideo.com	12/20
Official U.S. PlayStation Magazine	2.5/5

Digimon World 3 received a 27 out of 40 total score from editors of Japanese Weekly Famitsu magazine, and would sell 83,635 units in Japan by the end of 2002, becoming the 142nd most-bought software title that year in the region.

The game received "generally unfavorable reviews" from Western critics according to video game review aggregator website Metacritic. Critics such as Brad Shoemaker of GameSpot found faults with the title's "tiresome" gameplay, commenting on the constant need to grind experience points to power up the player's Digimon in a combat engine that is "painfully slow and tedious to use." Although the reviewer acknowledged its budget retail pricing and "surprisingly easy on the eyes" background graphics, they would ultimately declare it "at best an average role-playing game that will appeal only to fans of the greater Digimon franchise." Fennec Fox of GamePro magazine similarly commented on the game's "impressive" world map graphics, along with its "extremely catchy anime-style music," but panned its "sluggish pace, long loading times, and some very ugly 3D models during battles." (Note: GamePro gave the game two 3/5 scores for graphics and control, 4.5/5 for sound, and 2/5 for fun factor.) Reviewers such as J.M. Vargas of PSX Nation compared the title to previous games in the series, saying that "There is none of the user-friendliness and open-ended approach that made "Super Smash Bros." clone "Digimon Rumble Arena" such a pleasant experience, commenting on the game's "tedious" training and battle system. Official U.S. PlayStation Magazine called it "Profoundly mediocre" and "the kind of game that only hardcore Digi-fans will like."

Digimon World 3 sold enough units in North America to qualify for Sony's "Greatest Hits" line, and was subsequently re-issued at a reduced price.
