= Digimon World 4 =

2005 video game

- North American PlayStation 2 cover art
- Developer: BEC
- Publisher: Bandai
- Director: Takao Nagasawa
- Producers: Ryo Mito; Atsushi Minowa
- Artist: Yasuo Nozoe
- Writer: Shinya Murakami
- Composer: Satoshi Ishikawa
- Series: Digimon
- Platforms: GameCube, PlayStation 2, Xbox
- Release: JP: January 6, 2005; NA: June 2, 2005; PAL: September 2, 2005 (PS2)
- Genre: Action role-playing
- Modes: Single-player, multiplayer

Digimon World 4, known as Digimon World X (デジモンワールドX, Dejimon Wārudo X) in Japan, is an action role-playing game for PlayStation 2, GameCube, and Xbox developed by BEC and published by Bandai as part of their Digimon franchise. Unlike previous games in the Digimon World series, it features action-based hack and slash gameplay and supports up to four players. Each player plays as either an Agumon, Veemon, Guilmon, or Dorumon. The game is loosely based on the 2005 Digital Monster X-Evolution film, even using footage from the movie itself. Only the PlayStation 2 version was released in the PAL region.

== Plot ==
The game's protagonists are members of the "D.S.G. (Digital Security Guard)". Based on Digital Monster X-Evolution, it is immediately revealed that a computer virus known as the "X-virus" is spreading quickly and is infecting many Digimon. "The Yamato Server" has disappeared, and a new server known as "The Doom Server" has taken its place. They are sent to the first area of the game named Death Valley to search for Chief Leomon. When it is completed the player finds out that The Doom Server may in fact be The Yamato Server. The player is then sent to destroy the "Doom Dome". This is where the first real boss appears, Apocalymon. The player is then sent to Dry Land to stop the X-Virus spreading and must defeat MaloMyotismon. They are then sent to the Venom Jungle to stop the Dread Note from launching and must then defeat Lucemon. They are then sent to the final area of the game Machine Pit to destroy the final boss Mecha Rogue X.

== Gameplay ==
Guilmon, controlled by the player, attacks enemies. Up to 4 players can join simultaneously, indicated by portraits on the bottom of the screen.

Digimon World 4 is an action role-playing game with elements of digital pet games. The game offers a choice of one of four starter Digimon: Dorumon, Veemon, Guilmon, or Agumon. Depending on what the player does in the game, the Digimon they select, and its level, it may gain a Digivolution. In this game the player does not use the Digimon powers but instead attacks the enemy by using weapons like swords, guns and axes.

== Development ==
Digimon World 4 was developed and published by Digimon series veteran Bandai. The game was first showcased at Electronic Entertainment Expo (E3) 2004 with release planned for that summer. It later enjoyed exhibition at E3 2005, and had gone gold by June 2. Specially marked copies of the game were packaged with a limited-edition Digimon trading card depicting a new Digimon called Dorumon.

== Reception ==
Reception

Aggregate score
Aggregator	Score		
Aggregator	GameCube	PS2	Xbox
Metacritic	55/100	48/100	54/100

Review scores
Publication	Score		
Publication	GameCube	PS2	Xbox
Famitsu	27/40	27/40	27/40
GameDaily	5/10	N/A	6/10
GameSpot	4.3/10	4.3/10	4.3/10
GameZone	N/A	N/A	6.5/10
IGN	6.1/10	6.1/10	6.1/10
Nintendo Power	7/10	N/A	N/A
PlayStation Official Magazine – UK	N/A	5/10	N/A
Official U.S. PlayStation Magazine	N/A	2/5	N/A
Official Xbox Magazine (US)	N/A	N/A	5.2/10
PlayStation: The Official Magazine	N/A	4/10	N/A
X-Play	N/A	2/5	N/A

The GameCube and Xbox versions received "mixed" reviews, while the PlayStation 2 version received "generally unfavorable reviews", according to the review aggregation website Metacritic. In Japan, Famitsu gave the game a score of 27 out of 40.

IGN said, "Digimon World 4 had the makings of a decent action role-playing game. Unfortunately, a myriad of issues bring it down. It has a wholly unsatisfying single-player game, made worse by a clunky camera and overly cheap enemies. It's also unbalanced, leaving players without any compatriots out in the cold. Bring in a few friends and things change drastically." The game was also criticized for its similarities to Final Fantasy Crystal Chronicles, yet "not coming close in terms of narrative, style and game mechanics," and for its drastically different style than the other Digimon World games.
