= DW4 =

DW4 may refer to:

- Digimon World 4
- Dragon Warrior 4
- Dynasty Warriors 4
