= Digimon World: Next Order =

2016 video game

- European cover art
- Developer: B.B. Studio (Note: Ported to Nintendo Switch and Windows by Hyde.)
- Publisher: Bandai Namco Entertainment
- Producers: Takayuki Shindo (Vita); Kazumasa Habu (PS4); Takahiro Yokota (Switch/PC)
- Artist: Taiki
- Composer: Toshiyuki Kishi
- Series: Digimon
- Engine: Unity
- Platforms: PlayStation Vita; PlayStation 4; Nintendo Switch; Microsoft Windows
- Release: PlayStation Vita: JP: March 17, 2016; PlayStation 4: PAL: January 27, 2017; NA: January 31, 2017; JP: February 26, 2017; Nintendo Switch, Windows: WW: February 22, 2023
- Genre: Role-playing
- Mode: Single-player

Digimon World: Next Order (Note: Digimon World: Next Order (Japanese: デジモンワールド -next 0rder-, Hepburn: Dejimon Wārudo Next Order)) (stylized as DIGIMON WORLD -next 0rder-) is a role-playing video game in the Digimon franchise and the sixth game in the Digimon World series. The game is developed by B.B. Studio and published by Bandai Namco Entertainment. The game was released for PlayStation Vita in Japan on March 17, 2016. The game would later release for PlayStation 4 in North America and PAL regions in January 2017, and in Japan on February 26, 2017, as Digimon World: Next Order International Edition. Nintendo Switch and Microsoft Windows versions were released on February 22, 2023.

== Gameplay ==
The player interacting with their two Digimon pet

Digimon World: Next Order is a role-playing game set in an open world environment and played from a third-person perspective where players take control of a human character who is accompanied by two partner Digimon. The player chooses from ten possible starting companions at the beginning of the game, who grow and evolve throughout the course of the story by taking part in battles and interacting with their owner. If the partner fails to meet the requirements for any of its next possible stages within a set amount of days, it collapses, dies, and is reborn into an egg of the player's choosing, each time with a slight boost to its stats. Players can increase the bond between their Digimon and themselves by praising, scolding, feeding, or offering items. Together, they travel through various environments completing objectives and advancing the story by interacting with non-player characters and battling enemy Digimon they encounter in the field.

Battles themselves take place in real-time when an enemy creature is touched, which causes a circular-shaped battle area to appear which each partner is free to move within. The companion Digimon act automatically through an assigned AI strategy while the player can halt combat to issue commands or use restorative items. Players can switch between either partner in battle to issue specific commands or instigate a special evolution where both Digimon temporarily merge. After battle, their Digimon's stats are increased, making them stronger. A total of 217 obtainable Digimon creatures are available in the Japanese version of the game. with a further 15 added to the western version of the game, taking the total to 232. The localized Nintendo Switch version removed the ability to play the game with Japanese voices. After complaints, the voices were patched back in on 11 April 2023.

== Premise ==
The game's story centers around two potential main characters: Japanese third-year high school students Takuto (タクト) and Shiki (シキ). Takuto was once a passionate Digimon fan in his youth, even becoming runner-up in a national tournament, but has since become more concerned with adolescent life and wondering about his future. He and Shiki are transported to the Digital World, where they meet their Digimon partners, including Agumon, Gabumon, Biyomon and Palmon. They are joined on their journey by classmates Kouta Hirose (広瀬コウタ), whose partner is Guilmon he nicknamed "Yukimura", and Himari Oofuchi (大淵ヒマリ, Oofuchi Himari), who is partnered with a Salamon she nicknamed "Rikka".

== Development ==
Digimon World: Next Order was first announced in a July 2015 issue of V Jump magazine, along with a tentative release date of 2016 in Japan for the PlayStation Vita. A trailer for the game was showcased at the 2015 Tokyo Game Show the following September, alongside an English trailer for Digimon Story: Cyber Sleuth. The game's promotional materials and character designs were done by Japanese artist Taiki. In early November, Japanese singer Eir Aoi uploaded a promotional video in which she announced she would be working on the game's opening theme "Accentier" (アクセンティア), which was released as a single on March 2, 2016. Later that month, Bandai Namco Entertainment revealed that Digimon Adventure tri.'s Meicoomon would be available as downloadable content for the game. All of the original Japanese DLC was included in the base game for the west, whilst new DLC including new Digimon and quests were released a week after the games' western release.

The game's music was composed by Toshiyuki Kishi, and an official commercial soundtrack called the Digimon World / Digimon World: Next Order Original Game Soundtrack was available exclusively as a digital-only release in North America as a pre-order bonus, and in Europe from the Bandai Namco online store. It contains 33 tracks from the game, along with 36 tracks from the original Digimon World released on the PlayStation in 1999 composed by Koji Yamada and Yuko Ishii.

== Reception ==
Reception

Aggregate score
Aggregator	Score
Metacritic	PS4: 68/100; NS: 61/100

Review scores
Publication	Score
Destructoid	8/10
Famitsu	33/40
RPGFan	5/10
PlayStation LifeStyle	8/10

The PlayStation Vita release of Digimon World: Next Order earned a 33 out of 40 score from Japanese Weekly Famitsu magazine, based on individual reviews of 8, 8, 9, and 8, while the English PlayStation 4 version received average to mixed reviews from Western critics with a 68 out of 100 average score on aggregate review website Metacritic. Alisa McAloon of Destructoid took note of the title's graphics, which she felt suffered from the console version being a port of the handheld PlayStation Vita release, and that it "is littered with small little hiccups that remind players that what they're playing isn't taking full advantage of the platform they purchased it for." The reviewer ultimately felt that the game would appeal more to long-time fans of the series after nearly a decade of unlocalized Western releases, stating that it "isn't without flaws, but it's exactly the kind of game the Digimon World series needed after a regional hiatus," calling it "an impressive effort." Derek Heemsbergen of RPGFan commended the game's high number of included Digimon partners that gave it variety, but panned the title's repetitive gameplay, "banal" story, and unintuitive controls, calling its menu and battle system "messy on almost every conceivable level." PlayStation LifeStyle's Martin Patiño likewise criticized Next Order's "endlessly grindy" gameplay that required players to perform repetitive tasks to advance, but commended it for the large amount of content, including side quests and raising the player's Digimon companions.

=== Sales ===
The PS Vita version entered the Japanese Media Create sales charts as the 2nd highest-selling game in the region during its debut week with 64,218 copies sold, and would go on to sell a total of 77,758 copies by the end of 2016, becoming the 98th best-selling software title that year. The PlayStation 4 version debuted at number 13 on Japanese charts, selling 5,930 copies within its first week. In the United Kingdom, Next Order was the 24th highest selling game in the week of release. The Switch port debuted at number 13 on Japanese charts, selling 7,140 copies within its first week. By October 2024, the game sold over 1 million copies.
