= DW3 =

DW3 may refer to:

- Death Wish 3
- Digimon World 3
- Dragon Warrior III
- Dynasty Warriors 3
