= DW2 =

DW2 may refer to:

- Digimon World 2
- Dragon Warrior II
- Dynasty Warriors 2
