= Digimon World Data Squad =

2006 video game

- North American box art
- Developer: BEC
- Publisher: Bandai Namco Games
- Composers: Hitoshi Sakimoto; Masaharu Iwata; Kimihiro Abe; Mitsuhiro Kaneda; Noriyuki Kamikura
- Series: Digimon
- Platform: PlayStation 2
- Release: JP: November 30, 2006; NA: September 18, 2007
- Genres: Action-adventure, role-playing
- Mode: Single-player

Digimon World Data Squad, known in Japan as Digimon Savers: Another Mission (デジモンセイバーズ アナザーミッション, Dejimon Seibāzu Anazā Misshon), is an action-adventure role-playing video game developed by BEC and published by Bandai Namco Games for the PlayStation 2. It was released in Japan in November 2006, and later in North America in September 2007, and is based on the Digimon Data Squad anime series. It is not part of the Digimon World series of games as its localized title implies.

== Gameplay ==
The game is set in the anime's universe, and revolves around the Seven Great Demon Lords. In this game the player will be able to control the four main Savers characters, Marcus Damon, Thomas H. Norstein, Yoshino "Yoshi" Fujieda, along with their respective Digimon partners. The graphics for this game are cel-shaded and the battle system is similar to the Battle Terminal (a Japanese-only arcade game). The game is classified as a "special genre", called a "Dramatic/Innovative RPG", which means that the Digimon partners are affected by how you, the player, treat them. The way your Digimon evolves will be similar to Digimon World; the Digimon will be affected by how you take care of it and, depending on that, will digivolve into different types of Digimon. In Digimon World Data Squad, a new type of digivolution method is used, called the Galactica Evolution System: this will determine what Digimon your partner will evolve into. There will also be new, original characters for this game, meaning that these characters are exclusive to Digimon World Data Squad, and will not appear in any other Digimon Data Squad media.

Exclusive characters include Yuma Kagura, who has a Renamon as her partner; Kosaburo Katsura, a cocky private investigator who has an extremely clumsy, female Biyomon as his partner; Tsukasa Kagura, who is Yuma's older brother, and the new DATS technician, who graduated from the same academy as Thomas; Masaki Nitta, who is said to be a part of DATS' past, but is currently missing; and Manami Nitta, Masaki's daughter.

== Plot ==
After a tutorial fight with an Otamamon, Marcus Damon and Agumon take on Tylomon who is sinking ships in the area of Walter Island. After Tylomon is defeated, Creepymon appears and defeats GeoGreymon. When Creepymon tries to take down Marcus and Agumon, Creepymon notices Marcus' Digivice iC and flees. Yoshino arrives to recall Marcus and Agumon to DATS HQ. Meanwhile, a girl named Yuma ends up kidnapped by two DemiDevimon and her Renamon arrives late.

At DATS HQ, Commander Sampson and Kudamon report that 5 children have gone missing throughout the world. He sends Marcus and Yoshino to Sneyato Forest to rendezvous with Thomas and take down Bakemon who is tampering with Earth's electricity. When they catch up with Thomas, a fight ensues with Bakemon. During battle, Bakemon Digivolves into Myotismon and a mysterious transmission tells them how to defeat Myotismon. After that is done, the DATS members return to DATS HQ and discover that Thomas' old friend Tsukasa Kagura has transferred here and was the one who gave them the tactics to defeat Myotismon. He also tells them that his sister Yuma has gone missing.

Arriving at Rage Caverns, Kagura warns the DATS members that their Digimon may not Digivolve into the same Digimon due to the activity in the Dark Area. The three arrive at Rage Caverns to find another Digimon target. After a series of earthquakes, the DATS members find the source to be Belphemon. After Belphemon has been defeated, a boy named Wyiu is rescued with the Code Key of Sloth in his possession, which a private investigator, Kosaburo Katsura steals with help of his Biyomon. When he escapes, Kagura prepares an immediate evac for the DATS members to bring the boy back. Creepymon is then seen at the door to the Dark Area as a mysterious person approaches him.

Sampson tells the DATS members about Misaki Nitta, who left DATS due to harming a criminal with his Digimon partner. Yoshino reveals that Kosaburo interfered with her past missions when it came to the info of the Code Key of Sloth.

After Keenan Crier joins the team, another huge Digimon signature is detected at Mirage Museum. The four see an unknown footage that shows what might be Yuma who is replaced with Lilithmon on an island. The Mao Digimon Barbamon appears and fights the team. He is defeated and a girl named Florida is rescued. After a confusing conversation with the girl, the Code Key of Greed is spotted. Kosaburo and Biyomon appear again and steal it. He disappears as Kagura prepares an immediate evac for the DATS members and the girl's safety.

Back at DATS HQ, Kagura tells the team that his sister Yuma was nicknamed "monster girl" cause she can talk to "monsters." Kagura identifies the footage from the Mirage Museum to be an SOS from Livilus Island. The team is dispatched there to answer an SOS which turned out to be from Renamon who collapsed near them. After recovering, Renamon tells the DATS members that Yuma has become part of the material that comprises the Mao Digimon Lilithmon. They encounter Lilithmon who insults Yoshino and a battle begins. After Lilithmon is defeated, Yuma returns to normal. Gaomon manages to attack Biyomon before Kosaburo can claim the Lust Code Key. When Kosaburo Digivolves Biyomon into Birdramon, Renamon uses what she has left to heal the other Digimon. The DATS team defeats Kosaburo and Birdramon, but they escape. Kagura arrives since he lost contact with the DATS members and tells Yuma that they will treat Renamon at DATS' facilities.

At the Sea Precipice Jerapilus, Kosaburo makes contact with his client, and tells him that DATS has the Code Key of Lust. Despite this, he transfers the two Code Keys, Sloth and Greed, to his client. The mysterious person gives the 'investigator' the money agreed for the cards, and leaves with the fact that the event "ends their relationship." When Kosaburo and Biyomon talk about what to do with their pay, Creepymon arrives and attacks the two.

The DATS team arrives at the Digital Dungeon and ensue in a battle with Beelzemon. When they defeat Beelzemon, a Western Boy named Yèhèrta is freed. The teams finds the Code Key of Gluttony in his possession.

When the DATS team arrives at the Sea Precipice Jerapilus, they ensue in a battle with Leviamon and defeat him. They also find a silent cool girl named Yigua who had the Code Key of Envy. Kagura arrives to claim the Code Key. An injured Kosaburo arrives to tell them that Kagura was the unknown client, since he planted a tracking device in Kagura's pocket. As the tracking device goes off, Thomas finds the Code Keys in Kagura's pockets.

Kagura then tells Thomas that his henchmen, DemiDevimon and Devimon had kidnapped Yuma and her friends, the other missing children, because he wanted them to become the confused sins of the Mao Digimon. Two DemiDevimon snatch the Code Keys from Yoshi. After that, they battle two DemiDevimon and two Devimon and win. After the battle, Kagura disappears with all Five Code Keys.

Commander Sampson calls and the DATS team tells him everything, much to their surprise.

After Kosaburo joins the team, they find that Kagura is using the Code Keys to unlock the seal to the Cho-Mao Digimon, Lucemon. The team is sent to a forest where the Digital World begins to fall apart. In a re-match against Creepymon, the DATS team emerges as the victor. A gate to the Real World appears, which Creepymon flies through. He drops a Digivice iC, which the team identifies. Yoshino asks what he means by "going home." Yuma then joins the five.

In the Real World, after defeating some Digimon that were attacking the Real World, they find Creepymon again for a final battle against him. After he was finally defeated, it is revealed that Nitta was missing because he was used as part of the material to create Creepymon. Nitta regained awareness and accepted the fact that he had become a Digimon. The Digivice (which Yoshi had picked up), however, did not belong to him, but to his daughter. He wanted a way to see his daughter again, making the Digivice appear. He was to become her Digimon. Because the device locked on to his Digital signature, he could never go back to being a human even if he was defeated. Before Nitta vanishes, he tells Yoshino to tell his daughter that he loves her. He also reveals that Kagura has the Code Key of Wrath, thus he has all the Code Keys (Wrath, Gluttony, Greed, Sloth, Envy and Lust) to unseal Lucemon.

Kagura summons Lucemon. Yuma tells her brother that what he's doing isn't right. After Lucemon is defeated, he absorbs Kagura (revealing Kagura himself as the final Code Key of Pride, the first six were to free him from his physical imprisonment in the Dark Area itself and the Code Key of Pride was necessary for Lucemon to leave the boundaries of the Dark Area as well as send his power out beyond) and retreats. After a group of Mega Digimon are defeated, the DATS team confront Lucemon. After beating him, he changes into his Shadow Lord Mode. When the six emerge the victor, Kagura is freed from Lucemon and lies on the ground, asking for forgiveness.

== Development ==
As part of a measure to create the atmosphere of a digital world in which the characters are trapped, developer Bandai Namco Games added polygonal and pixelated elements to the environments. The game was announced by Namco Bandai Games on May 16, 2007, exhibited at Electronic Entertainment Expo (E3) 2007, and had gone gold by August 13.

== Reception ==
Reception

Aggregate score
Aggregator	Score
Metacritic	43/100

Review scores
Publication	Score
Famitsu	25/40
GameDaily	4/10
GameSpot	4.5/10
GameZone	4.3/10
Hardcore Gamer	3/5
IGN	3.5/10
PlayStation: The Official Magazine	4/10
RPGFan	35%

The game received "generally unfavorable reviews" according to the review aggregation website Metacritic. In Japan, however, Famitsu gave it a score of one eight, two sixes, and one five for a total of 25 out of 40.
