= Digimon Rumble Arena 2 =

2004 video game

- North American PlayStation 2 cover art
- Developers: Bandai; Black Ship Games
- Publisher: Bandai
- Series: Digimon
- Platforms: PlayStation 2, GameCube, Xbox
- Release: JP: July 29, 2004; NA: September 3, 2004; NA: September 6, 2004 (GC); EU: October 15, 2004; AU: October 22, 2004; AU: November 19, 2004 (GC)
- Genre: Fighting
- Modes: Single-player, multiplayer

Digimon Rumble Arena 2, known as Digimon Battle Chronicle (デジモンバトルクロニクル, Dejimon Batoru Kuronikuru) in Japan, is a 2004 Digimon fighting video game, released by Bandai for the PlayStation 2, GameCube, and the Xbox. It is the sequel to 2001's Digimon Rumble Arena and has a similar style of gameplay as Super Smash Bros. Melee, except with a health meter. Digimon All-Star Rumble, a spiritual successor to the Rumble Arena games, was later released in 2014.

== Plot ==
In Digimon Rumble Arena 2, Digimon use their digivolving techniques while participating in a battle royale to determine the strongest Digimon.

== Reception ==
Reception

Aggregate score
Aggregator	Score
Metacritic	(GCN) 71/100 (5 reviews) (PS2) 63/100 (9 reviews) (XBOX) 65/100 (8 reviews)

Review score
Publication	Score
IGN	7/10
