= Digimon World Championship =

2008 video game

- North American box art
- Developer: Epics
- Publisher: Namco Bandai Games
- Series: Digimon
- Platform: Nintendo DS
- Release: JP: February 14, 2008; NA: August 26, 2008
- Genre: Life simulation
- Mode: Single-player

Digimon World Championship (デジモンチャンピオンシップ Dejimon Chanpionshippu, lit. Digimon Championship) is a life simulation video game developed by Epics and published by Bandai Namco Games for the Nintendo DS, as part of the Digimon franchise. It was released in Japan in February 2008 and North America in August 2008. Despite its localized title in North America, the game is not part of the Digimon World sub-series of role-playing games.

== Gameplay ==
One Digimon attacks another, with the teams of both sides visible on the top screen.

Digimon World Championship is a simulation title which focuses singularly on the virtual pet raising, caretaking, training, and battling with no RPG or world exploration elements. It varies from other Digimon games released on Nintendo DS in that the player does not give commands in a fight but the Digimon choose their attacks themselves. It also requires that the player feeds and looks after their Digimon, also having to heal, cure, and clean up after them, much like the older Digimon games. This is also the first Digimon game to include the Dracomon line of Digimon, featuring Petitmon, Babydmon, Dracomon, Coredramon (Air), Coredramon (Ground), Wingdramon, Groundramon, Slayerdramon, and Breakdramon. The starting Digimon is Botamon.

== Reception ==
Reception

Aggregate scores
| Aggregator | Score |
|---|---|
| GameRankings | 55.14% |
| Metacritic | 49/100 |

Review scores
| Publication | Score |
|---|---|
| GameSpot | 5.5/10 |
| IGN | 4.5/10 |

IGN staff writer Lucas M. Thomas listed the game as one of the "tears" on his "Cheers & Tears" list of DS fighting games. He bemoaned the confusing nature of the Digivolution mechanic, adding that the Pokémon series offered a more straightforward approach to evolution.
