= Digimon Racing =

2004 racing video game

- European box art From left to right: Agumon, Guilmon (highlighted), and Veemon.
- Developer: Griptonite Games
- Publisher: Bandai
- Series: Digimon
- Platform: Game Boy Advance
- Release: JP: April 1, 2004; PAL: April 30, 2004; NA: September 13, 2004
- Genre: Racing
- Modes: Single-player, multiplayer

Digimon Racing (Note: Japanese: デジモンレーシング, Hepburn: Dejimon Rēshingu) is a racing video game developed by Griptonite Games and published by Bandai (now Namco Bandai Games) for the Game Boy Advance. Part of the Digimon media franchise and video game series, it utilizes Digimon's characters and elements. Its gameplay largely resembles that of traditional racing games, but also utilizes elements of kart racing and action games. Its eleven playable characters can be increased to over 33 via Digivolution.

Digimon Racing uses 2D scaled graphics and voice acting. The game was initially announced at Electronic Entertainment Expo (E3) 2003 and later exhibited at E3 2004. It was released on April 1, 2004, in Japan; April 30 in Europe; and September 13 in North America. It received mixed reviews from critics upon release, with criticism directed at its resemblance to other kart racers of the time and praise at some aesthetic and gameplay aspects.

== Gameplay ==
Greymon, an evolutionary form of Agumon, competes in a race. HUD features clockwise from top left: ranking, time elapsed, lap, course map, two items that he can use at will, and energy meter.

Digimon Racing is a racing video game that utilizes characters and elements from Digimon as well as those of traditional racing games. The game follows a group of Digimon competing in a racing tournament within the Digital World, home to all Digimon. The purpose of the grand prix is to determine who is the best racer; thus, they use specially designed karts that equate all contestants in terms of ability.

Digimon Racing's gameplay largely resembles that of traditional racing games. It focuses on competing against five CPU-controlled characters in cup races consisting of three laps. The usage of items to attack opponents and improve one's own condition is an integral part of the gameplay, and adds an element of kart racing games. A new feature in the game is "kart hopping": using the karts to jump onto opponents, slowing them down. This adds an element of action gameplay. Digivolution, a recurring theme in Digimon, also plays a role in the game. Driving over energy hotspots scattered throughout the tracks increases an energy meter located at the bottom left of the game's HUD. As the meter increases, the player traverses the Digimon's evolutionary line, becoming more powerful and ultimately gaining the ability to use a special attack.

The game has fifteen tracks, of which three are boss battles and twelve are traditional racetracks, and are based on conventional video game environments such as jungles, volcanoes, and cities. The twelve racetracks are initially split into three cups of four, and after completing a cup for the first time, a boss battle is unlocked, for which beating will unlock the next cup. The action-oriented boss battles involve defeating a generally static Digimon using items scattered throughout the areas, which are not designed as race tracks. The player can also compete in single races unrelated to the story in any unlocked tracks. The game uses the Game Boy Advance Wireless Adapter or Game Link Cable accessories for a multiplayer racing mode supporting up to four players.

=== Playable characters ===
The game features eleven Digimon as playable characters. Eight characters are available immediately; the remaining three are unlockable by completing the different game modes. However, the Digivolution mechanic increases the total number of playable Digimon to 33. The cast predominantly includes popular Digimon from the Digimon anime. Characters' racing abilities differ through their ranking in three areas: speed, handling and acceleration.

- Agumon
- Agunimon (Note: Unlockable character)
- Biyomon
- Gabumon
- Gomamon
- Guilmon
- Palmon
- Patamon
- Tentomon
- Salamon
- Veemon

== Development and release ==
Unlike previous games in the series which were developed by Japanese companies, Digimon Racing's development was handled by the Kirkland, Washington, United States–based Griptonite Games. However, Digimon series veteran Bandai (now Namco Bandai Games) returned to publish the game. It was the first original Digimon game for the Game Boy Advance, since Digimon Battle Spirit and Digimon Battle Spirit 2 were ports of WonderSwan Color games. The game uses the Mode 7 engine to create three-dimensional gameplay on the handheld console otherwise incapable of such a feat. It occasionally uses voice acting during races, uncommon in Game Boy Advance games. The game was initially announced at E3 2003. It was later exhibited at E3 2004, with the North American release announced for August 2004. Upon completion of development, the game received a rating of "E" (Everyone) from the Entertainment Software Rating Board (ESRB) and "3+" from Pan European Game Information (PEGI). Digimon Racing's release fell on April 1, 2004, in Japan; April 30 in Europe; and September 13 in North America.

== Reception ==
Reception

Aggregate score
Aggregator	Score
Metacritic	62%

Review scores
Publication	Score
1Up.com	C
Famitsu	23/40
GameZone	7.4/10
IGN	7/10
Nintendo Power	6.2/10

Digimon Racing received "mixed or average" reviews according to Metacritic. Critics criticized the game for its close resemblance to other kart racers of the time. IGN's Craig Harris and 1UP.com's Garnett Lee stated that Digimon Racing's gameplay mirrored that of Crash Nitro Kart and the Mario Kart series respectively. Aside from the familiar format, critics praised specific aesthetic points such as the graphics and music (GameZone's Michael Lafferty) and the tracks' layouts and themes (Lee). Aspects of the gameplay were also praised, such as control (Harris and Lee), multiplayer mode (Lee), replay value, and kart hopping (Harris). Nintendo Power stated that "[t]he racing action is similar to that of other kart games, but the Digimon influence adds a fun gameplay edge." Famitsu's four reviewers gave the game scores of 5, 5, 7, and 6 out of 10, respectively, resulting in a total score of 23 out of 40. AllGame's T.J. Deci gave the game three stars out of five, although he did not provide a more thorough review.
