= Digimon World Re:Digitize =

2012 video game

- Japanese PSP cover art
- Developer: tri-Crescendo
- Publisher: Bandai Namco Games
- Producer: Kazumasa Habu
- Artist: Suzuhito Yasuda
- Series: Digimon
- Platforms: PlayStation Portable, Nintendo 3DS
- Release: PlayStation Portable: JP: July 19, 2012; Nintendo 3DS: JP: June 27, 2013
- Genre: Role-playing
- Modes: Single-player, multiplayer

Digimon World Re:Digitize (Note: Japanese: デジモンワールド リ:デジタイズ, Hepburn: Dejimonwārudo Ri: Dejitaizu) is a 2012 role-playing video game developed by tri-Crescendo and published by Bandai Namco Games for the PlayStation Portable. The fifth entry in the Digimon World series, itself part of the Digimon franchise, the game features a return to the gameplay mechanics introduced in the original game. An enhanced port was released for the Nintendo 3DS on June 27, 2013 under the title Digimon World Re:Digitize Decode. (Note: Japanese: デジモンワールド リ:デジタイズ デコード, Hepburn: Dejimonwārudo Ri: Dejitaizu Dekōdo)

== Gameplay ==
In the game, the player follows and controls "Taiga," a 16-year-old male protagonist who is transported to the digital world of Digimon, which in his universe is merely an online game; similar in concept to Digimon World. In the universe of Digimon, people raise creatures collectively referred to as Digimon, similar in concept to Tamagotchi. Players raise the digimon through stages of growth that determine his personality, the five stages being "Baby", "Child", "Adult", "Perfect" and "Ultimate." Digimon evolve over time by gaining stats and other factors. Digimon can get hungry, sick, injured or die and need care to recover. The game has over 10,000 accessories to collect and equip on their digimon, which alter the character's in-game appearance, such as goggles, or an afro.

== Characters ==
Taiga is the main protagonist of the game. His Digimon partner is Agumon. Nicolai Petrov is Taiga's best friend. His father works in GIGO company. His Digimon partner is Gaomon. Akiho Rindo is a mysterious girl that follows Taiga around. Her Digimon partner is Biyomon. Mikagura Mirei is the girl who sends an email to the Digital World. Her Digimon partners are Angewomon and LadyDevimon. Yuya Kuga is the heir of GIGO company. His Digimon partner is BlackWarGreymon X. Rina Shinomiya is a new tamer who only appears in the Decode 3DS version of the game. Her Digimon partner is Veemon.

The game also contains a number of guest characters from other games, including Lili from the Tekken series, Taichi Yagami, Sora Takenouchi, and Yamato Ishida from Digimon Adventure, and Takato Matsuda from Digimon Tamers. These character primarily appear in the wireless battles.

== Development ==
Digimon World Re:Digitize was first announced in July 2011, in an issue of V-Jump, as the first Digimon game for the PlayStation Portable. The game was announced to be developed by Japanese video game developer Tri-Crescendo, who had previously worked on the two Baten Kaitos games, and feature character art from Suzuhito Yasuda, who had previously done the character art for Shin Megami Tensei: Devil Survivor and Devil Survivor 2. The original premise of Re:Digitize was to call back to the first Digimon World game; unlike the sequels. Two trailers were released for Re:Digitize; a teaser trailer and a second trailer. Namco Bandai released limited copies that included a code to unlock a rare Digimon for the GREE game Digimon Collectors.

=== Release and localization ===
The original game was released on PSP on July 19, 2012, and the enhanced port for the Nintendo 3DS was released on June 27, 2013, both only in Japan. After no English-language versions were announced for any other regions, a fan campaigned called "Operation Decode", an offshoot of the Operation Rainfall campaign, was created. While tens of thousands of digital signatures requesting the game be released in English, as of 2015, no further announcement of other releases has been made by Bandai Namco, though they have commented that the support coming from the campaign was "interesting." In 2013, a fan translation was started by a similarly named group, called "Operation Decoded", led by users "Romsstar" and "Sporky McForkinspoon." The group worked on the translation for over two years before it was released on June 22, 2015. The group, without "Sporky McForkinspoon", released the Decode fan translation on December 31, 2020.

== Reception and sales ==
Reception

Review score
Publication	Score
Famitsu	31 / 40 (PSP); 32 / 40 (3DS)

The PlayStation Portable version debuted with over 85,000 copies sold, making it the fourth best-selling game in Japan in the week of July 16, 2012, and would go on to sell a total of approximately 153,780 copies in the region by the end of 2012, becoming the 74th best-selling game that year. It received a 31 out of 40 total score from Japanese Weekly Famitsu magazine, based on individual reviews of 8, 8, 7, and 8. The Nintendo 3DS version would sell 34,350 copies at its launch nearly one year later, with a total of 71,967 copies sold by the end of 2013, becoming the 139th highest-selling software title that year. It was granted a slightly higher score of 32 out of 40 from Famitsu, based on reviews of 8, 8, 8, and 8.

== Manga adaptation ==
A two-chapter manga adaptation, illustrated by Kouhei Fujino, was published in Shueisha's V Jump magazine in 2012. Another manga series by Fujino, titled Digimon World Re:Digitize Encode, started in V Jump on April 20, 2013. The series was later moved online; the 22nd and latest chapter was published on the V Jump+ app in November 2015. Shueisha released two tankōbon volumes on December 4, 2013, and February 4, 2015.
