= Digimon World Dawn and Dusk =

Digimon World Dawn Digimon World Dusk
- North American cover art for Digimon World Dawn and Dusk, respectively
- Developer: BEC
- Publisher: Namco Bandai Games
- Series: Digimon
- Engine: Digimon World DS engine
- Platform: Nintendo DS
- Release: JP: March 29, 2007; NA: September 18, 2007
- Genre: Role-playing video game
- Modes: Single-player, multiplayer

Digimon World Dawn and Digimon World Dusk, originally released as Digimon Story Sunburst & Moonlight (デジモンストーリー サンバースト&ムーンライト, Dejimon Sutōrī Sanbāsuto & Mūnraito) in Japan, are two role-playing video games for the Nintendo DS handheld game console released in Japan on March 29, 2007, and North America on September 18, 2007. Together, they serve as the second installment of the Digimon Story series, part of the larger Digimon franchise.

== Plot ==
The player assumes the role of Digimon Tamer rookies ascending the ranks of their tamer team, before a strange virus causes an earthquake in the Sunshine and Darkmoon districts, damaging the access points to the Digital World and causing many Digimon to mysteriously degenerate into Digi-Eggs. The game's overall story changes depending on which version of the game being played, as the player takes the role of either a Night Crow tamer from Darkmoon City or a Light Fang tamer from Sunshine City to uncover the mystery behind the tremors. Despite being two separate games, they have parallel story lines that interweave, with the main tamer teams being in opposition of each other. Players have the option to play as either a boy or a girl. Players also get different Digimon depending on which game is being played.

== Gameplay ==
Digimon World Dawn and Dusk are story driven dungeon crawl role playing games that focus around collecting and battling over 400 of monsters called Digimon. The quest counter in the main city of each game provides players with quests that they can go on to achieve rewards (species quests) and progress the story (union quests). The areas explored as well as Digimon species encounters differ between versions of the game, with World Dawn having more aqua, bird, dragon and holy species and World Dusk containing more dark, machine, organic and beast species. During battles players can send out up to three Digimon at a time from a total party size of six, battling up to 5 enemies. The turn-based battle system is centered around a field of five zones, with different attacks targeting a different number of zones. Different Digimon species have main attributes and weaknesses which cause attacks to do more or less damage to an enemy Digimon, respectively. Players are also able to equip their Digimon with equipment to further boost their abilities.

Digimon that do not fit into the party are instead sent to the Digifarm, allowing them to slowly gain experience, the rate of which can be influenced by decorations that are purchased for the farm. Alongside this, players can also purchase terrain boards and background music to customize the appearance of their Digifarm. Another addition to a player's home is the Digilab which can be accessed to allow players to create new Digimon. At the start of every battle a Digimon gets partially scanned an amount dependent on the player's Tamer Rank. Once a specific Digimon's scan level has reached 100%, they can be created at the Digilab. Digimon are also able to evolve into a stronger forms at the Digilab. The Digimon that it evolves into is based on player choice along a branching pathway once a certain level or prerequisites are met and causes its appearance to change and statistics to greatly increase. There are also opportunities to return to a prior evolutionary form, called degenerating in which afterwards the player can select a new evolution path for the Digimon to progress along. Evolution progression goes as follows: Digi-egg, in-training, rookie, champion, ultimate and finally mega. New Digimon can also be obtained by breeding two Digimon together, which creates an egg that will eventually hatch into a creature possessing traits from both parent Digimon. Whilst being able to play with the regular buttons on the Nintendo DS, the game also utilizes the touchscreen and stylus to control movement along the bottom screen, whilst the Digifarm is displayed on the top screen.

Digimon World Dawn and Dusk are compatible with the Nintendo DS's local wireless capabilities to trade, battle and match (breeding Digimon together to create eggs) Digimon between players. The Nintendo Wi-Fi Connection (WFC) is also available for players to battle and match Digimon across the world. Battling with other players earns Tamer Points which allows for increasing a player's tamer rank and battling more skilled opponents.

== Development ==
The games' English titles were confirmed on May 16, 2007. The game was exhibited in a small booth at Electronic Entertainment Expo (E3) 2007.

== Reception ==
Reception

Aggregate score
Aggregator	Score
Metacritic	(Dawn) 68/100 (Dusk) 67/100

Review scores
Publication	Score
Famitsu	28/40
GameDaily	(Dusk) 6/10
GameSpot	6/10
GameZone	(Dusk) 7.5/10
IGN	7/10
Jeuxvideo.com	(Dusk) 10/20
RPGFan	75%

Digimon World Dawn and Dusk received "average" reviews according to the review aggregation website Metacritic. GameSpot praised its customization when it came to the variety of Digimon but stated that its story felt weak and that the games as a whole were too similar to their predecessor, Digimon World. RPGFan called the games solid RPG experiences but for players to not expect a deep plot or exceptional graphics. IGN expressed disappointment with their tedious approach to story quests but enjoyed the amount of content to experience and the battle mechanics. GamePro said of the game, "Series fans'll eat it up, but others may want to contemplate whether learning the Digiropes is something they're really willing to invest in." (Note: GamePro gave both games 3.5/5 for graphics, 2.5/5 for sound, 3/5 for control, and 3.25/5 for fun factor.) In Japan, Famitsu gave both games a score of 28 out of 40.
