= Digimon World 2 =

2000 video game

- North American box art
- Developer: BEC
- Publisher: Bandai
- Director: Takao Nagasawa
- Producer: Takayuki Shindo
- Programmers: Masahiro Terao; Kou Minegisi
- Artist: Yasuo Nozoe
- Writers: Akira Wakuri; Yōji Takase
- Composers: Kōji Yamada; Satoshi Ishikawa
- Series: Digimon
- Platform: PlayStation
- Release: JP: July 27, 2000; NA: April 3, 2001
- Genre: Role-playing
- Mode: Single-player

Digimon World 2 (Note: Japanese: デジモンワールド2, Hepburn: Dejimon Wārudo Tsu) is a dungeon crawler video game developed by BEC and published by Bandai for the PlayStation as part of their Digimon series. It is the sequel to the original Digimon World, and was released in Japan in July 2000 and North America the following year in April 2001. The player controls Akira, a Digimon Tamer whose goal is to climb to the top of the Digimon World.

== Gameplay ==
The player battles with three Digimon: Rosemon, WarGreymon, and SkullGreymon.

Digimon World 2 is a dungeon crawler RPG, a departure from its predecessor Digimon World, which focused on raising Digimon like pets. The player explores vast labyrinths dubbed "Domains", inside a tank called a "Digi-Beetle". These dungeons are filled with enemy Digimon, who once encountered, trigger a battle with the player's own team of Digimon in a battle system similar to other traditional turn-based JRPG's. The domains also contain various obstacles and traps such as land mines, energy fields called "Electro-Spores", giant stones, acid floors, treasure chests. Most traps can be disposed of by items that can be purchased at stores found across the game, and enemy Digimon can be befriended with "gift" items. However, the Digi-Beetle has a limited inventory, requiring careful management of items. Typically, at the end of each Domain there is a Boss, whether it be a lone Digimon, or another Tamer with a team of them. After defeating the Boss, the player may exit the Domain by means of an "Exit Portal" found near the Boss' location.

As the player's Digimon grow in levels, they are able to "digivolve" into newer and more powerful forms. The game contains four levels of Digivolution, Rookie, Champion, Ultimate, and Mega. The player can also make use of DNA digivolution to fuse two Digimon and create a new one, which will have higher stats and inherit all the techniques of its parents. Every Digimon's progress is limited by a level cap, after which they are no longer able to gain experience, forcing the player to make use of DNA digivolution to increase the level caps of their party.

== Plot ==
Akira lives in Digital City, a town located in fictional "Directory Continent", a land where Digimon used to live peacefully. However, wild Digimon began attacking Akira's hometown, and Akira joins a guard team that is charged with protecting the peace and security of the region.

At the start of the game, Akira finishes his last Training Mission and joins one of the Guard Teams (the player has the option of choosing between the Black Sword Team, the Gold Hawks team, or the Blue Falcon team). He receives missions from the Team Leader, which involve entering Domains and hunting down evil Digimon.

After defeating a handful of wild Digimon bosses, Digital City is attacked by the Blood Knights, a team of rebels led by Crimson, a former Digital City tamer. After facing off with numerous Blood Knights, including the loquacious and boastful Commander Damian, Akira fights and defeats Crimson, who flees to File Island. Akira rescues File City's leader Jijimon, who informs Akira that Crimson has made a pact with the Chaos Generals. Akira defeats ChaosWarGreymon, ChaosMetalSeadramon, and ChaosPiedmon, obtaining each of their rings to reveal Crimson's location. He also meets Esteena, a mysterious girl who appeared in a flash of light in File City, and GAIA, a seemingly malfunctioning robot owned by Akira's ally Kim. Akira defeats the Chaos Generals' leader Chaos Lord, and foils a plot by Commander Damien to destroy Digital City.

Esteena asks to speak with GAIA, who is revealed to be a rampant artificial intelligence. Esteena explains that the entire digital world is a computer simulation designed to study digital evolution, with Crimson in GAIA's thrall. After a final confrontation with the beastly transformed Crimson, Akira faces off with GAIA in the Kernel Zone. Upon defeating GAIA, the guard team chiefs and Mission Chief Carol explain that they were personnel on the Project GAIA simulation in the real world. They thank Akira for freeing the tamers from their extended suspended animation, and vow to build a new, safe Digital World.

== Development ==
Digimon World 2 was announced in conjunction with Digimon World in May 1997, before either's release.

== Reception ==
Reception

Aggregate score
Aggregator	Score
Metacritic	42/100

Review scores
Publication	Score
Electronic Gaming Monthly	2.8/10
Famitsu	27/40
IGN	4/10

Digimon World 2 received a 27 out of 40 total score from reviewers of Japanese Weekly Famitsu magazine. It earned a 42 out of 100 average score from aggregate review website Metacritic, which corresponds to "generally unfavorable reviews". David Smith of IGN called the game "essentially a dull dungeon crawler," declaring other titles such as Torneko: The Last Hope on the PlayStation to be "a better specimen of the genre," and that the game itself would only appeal to fans of the Mysterious Dungeon series or similar roguelikes. Although the reviewer found the graphics to be vibrant and colorful, the overall quality was described as "unrefined at best" along with a "standard" interface and that the overall experience was "ridiculously long, but not a whole lot of fun." Editors of Electronic Gaming Monthly felt that the title's combat system was "about as exciting as watching paint dry." Jim Cordeira of Gaming Age found the game to be "essentially a stripped down RPG for beginners," who commented on the simplicity of its combat by stating: "There is certainly nothing that would rival a true RPG in any way shape or form, but then again, that would probably just frustrate the younger gamers as to whom Digimon World 2 is geared towards."
