= List of Digimon video games =

Video games in the Digimon series

Digimon
- English version logo for Digimon
- Genres: Role-playing, fighting game, simulation
- Developers: Bandai Namco Entertainment, Dimps, and others
- Publisher: Bandai Namco Entertainment
- Platforms: Android OS; Game Boy Advance; iOS; Nintendo DS; Nintendo 3DS; GameCube; Nintendo Switch; PlayStation; PlayStation 2; PlayStation 3; PlayStation Portable; PlayStation Vita; PlayStation 4; PlayStation 5; Saturn; Windows; WonderSwan; WonderSwan Color; Xbox; Xbox 360; Xbox One; Xbox Series X/S
- First release: Digital Monster Ver. S: Digimon Tamers; September 23, 1998
- Latest release: Digimon UP; July 15, 2026
- Parent series: Digimon

This is a list of video games that are part of the Digimon franchise by Bandai Namco Entertainment (formerly Bandai). Most of the games have been developed by Namco Bandai Games and have been released for a variety of home and handheld game consoles, such as Bandai's own WonderSwan.

Common elements include battles between Digimon, with human "Tamers" present or otherwise, and the ability to "Digivolve" back and forth between several evolutionary forms. Due to similar features and mechanics, several games have drawn comparisons to that of the Pokémon franchise.

== Role-playing games ==
Despite being marketed as part of the Digimon World series in North America, Digimon World Championship and Digimon World Data Squad are standalone games.

=== Digimon World series ===
Game	Details
Digimon World Original release dates: JP: January 28, 1999 (PS); NA: May 23, 2000 (PS); PAL: July 6, 2001 (PS); KOR: April 27, 2002 (Windows)	Release years by system: 1999 – PlayStation; 2002 – Microsoft Windows
Digimon World Original release dates: JP: January 28, 1999 (PS); NA: May 23, 2000 (PS); PAL: July 6, 2001 (PS); KOR: April 27, 2002 (Windows)	Notes: Developed by Bandai; Digital pet and role-playing game based loosely on Bandai's Tamagotchi devices; Sold approximately 250,000 copies in Japan by February 2000
Digimon World: Digital Card Battle Original release date: JP: December 22, 1999	Release years by system: 1999 – PlayStation
Digimon World: Digital Card Battle Original release date: JP: December 22, 1999	Notes: Developed by Bandai; Card battling game based on the official trading card game
Pocket Digimon World Original release date: JP: June 29, 2000	Release years by system: 2000 – PlayStation
Pocket Digimon World Original release date: JP: June 29, 2000	Notes: Developed by Bandai; Sold 62,746 copies in Japan by July 2000
Digimon World 2 Original release dates: JP: July 27, 2000; NA: May 19, 2001	Release years by system: 2000 – PlayStation
Digimon World 2 Original release dates: JP: July 27, 2000; NA: May 19, 2001	Notes: Developed by Bandai; Dungeon crawling-based role-playing game in which the player traverses the Digital World on a "Digi-Beetle" and catches wild Digimon; Sold 126,444 copies in Japan by September 2000
Pocket Digimon World: Cool & Nature Battle Disc Original release date: JP: February 22, 2001	Release years by system: 2001 – PlayStation
Pocket Digimon World: Cool & Nature Battle Disc Original release date: JP: February 22, 2001	Notes: Developed by Bandai; Sold 5,022 copies in Japan in its first week of release
Pocket Digimon World: Wind Battle Disc Original release date: JP: October 26, 2000	Release years by system: 2001 – PlayStation
Pocket Digimon World: Wind Battle Disc Original release date: JP: October 26, 2000	Notes: Developed by Bandai; Sold 8,892 copies in Japan in the first week of its release
Digimon World 3 Original release dates: NA: June 5, 2002; JP: July 4, 2002; PAL: November 29, 2002	Release years by system: 2002 – PlayStation
Digimon World 3 Original release dates: NA: June 5, 2002; JP: July 4, 2002; PAL: November 29, 2002	Notes: Developed by Boom; Plot follows the characters Junior, Teddy, and Ivy, three friends who compete in the fictional massively multiplayer online role-playing game (MMORPG) Digimon Online; Features a new isometric viewpoint, as well as 20 additional Digimon; Titled Digimon World 3: Aratanaru Bouken no Tobira in Japan and Digimon World 2003 in Europe
Digimon World 4 Original release dates: JP: January 6, 2005; NA: June 2, 2005; PAL: September 2, 2005	Release years by system: 2005 – GameCube, PlayStation 2, Xbox
Digimon World 4 Original release dates: JP: January 6, 2005; NA: June 2, 2005; PAL: September 2, 2005	Notes: Developed by Bandai; Action role-playing game that emphasizes multiplayer gameplay; Plot follows 16 Digimon from the anime; Titled Digimon World X in Japan
Digimon World Data Squad Original release dates: JP: November 30, 2006; NA: September 18, 2007	Release years by system: 2006 – PlayStation 2
Digimon World Data Squad Original release dates: JP: November 30, 2006; NA: September 18, 2007	Notes: Developed by BEC Co., Ltd; Role-playing game that serves as a tie-in to Digimon Data Squad.; Uses a cel-shaded graphical style to capture the anime's aesthetic. Also contains polygonal and pixelated elements to create the atmosphere of a digital world in which the characters are trapped; Titled Digimon Savers: Another Mission in Japan
Digimon World Championship Original release dates: JP: February 14, 2008; NA: August 26, 2008; KOR: November 27, 2008	Release years by system: 2008 – Nintendo DS
Digimon World Championship Original release dates: JP: February 14, 2008; NA: August 26, 2008; KOR: November 27, 2008	Notes: Action role-playing game with elements of sports and digital pet games; Developed by Epics; Titled Digimon Championship in Japan and South Korea
Digimon World Re:Digitize Original release date: JP: July 19, 2012	Release years by system: 2012 – PlayStation Portable
Digimon World Re:Digitize Original release date: JP: July 19, 2012	Notes: Developed by tri-Crescendo
Digimon World Re:Digitize Decode Original release date: JP: June 27, 2013	Release years by system: 2013 – Nintendo 3DS
Digimon World Re:Digitize Decode Original release date: JP: June 27, 2013	Notes: Developed by tri-Crescendo; An enhanced port of Digimon World Re:Digitize
Digimon World: Next Order Original release dates: JP: March 17, 2016	Release years by system: 2016 - PlayStation Vita
Digimon World: Next Order International Edition Original release dates: JP: February 26, 2017; PAL: January 27, 2017; NA: January 30, 2017	Release years by system: 2017 – PlayStation 4; 2023 – Microsoft Windows, Nintendo Switch
Digimon World: Next Order International Edition Original release dates: JP: February 26, 2017; PAL: January 27, 2017; NA: January 30, 2017	Notes: An enhanced port of Digimon World: Next Order

=== Digimon Story series ===
Game	Details
Digimon Story Original release dates: JP: June 15, 2006; NA: November 7, 2006	Release years by system: 2006 – Nintendo DS
Digimon Story Original release dates: JP: June 15, 2006; NA: November 7, 2006	Notes: Developed by Namco Bandai Games; Plot follows a boy or girl who is absorbed through a computer into the Digital World while researching Digimon online; Allows players to manage Digimon outside the party on "Digi-Farm" locations in which the creatures gain experience and relieve stress; Titled Digimon World DS in North America
Digimon Story Sunburst Digimon Story Moonlight Original release dates: JP: March 29, 2007; NA: September 18, 2007	Release years by system: 2007 – Nintendo DS
Digimon Story Sunburst Digimon Story Moonlight Original release dates: JP: March 29, 2007; NA: September 18, 2007	Notes: Developed by Namco Bandai Games; Respectively titled Digimon World Dawn and Digimon World Dusk in North America
Digimon Story Lost Evolution Original release date: JP: July 1, 2010	Release years by system: 2010 – Nintendo DS
Digimon Story Lost Evolution Original release date: JP: July 1, 2010	Notes: Developed by Namco Bandai Games; Sold 36,105 copies in its first week
Digimon Story: Super Xros Wars Red Digimon Story: Super Xros Wars Blue Original release date: JP: March 3, 2011	Release years by system: 2011 – Nintendo DS
Digimon Story: Super Xros Wars Red Digimon Story: Super Xros Wars Blue Original release date: JP: March 3, 2011	Notes: Developed by Namco Bandai Games; Sold 35,752 copies in its first four days of release; Based on the Digimon Fusion anime series
Digimon Story: Cyber Sleuth Original release dates: JP: March 12, 2015 (Vita) December 14, 2017 (PS4); NA: February 2, 2016; PAL: February 5, 2016	Release years by system: 2015 – PlayStation Vita; 2016 – PlayStation 4; 2019 – Microsoft Windows, Nintendo Switch
Digimon Story: Cyber Sleuth Original release dates: JP: March 12, 2015 (Vita) December 14, 2017 (PS4); NA: February 2, 2016; PAL: February 5, 2016	Notes: Developed by Media.Vision
Digimon Story: Cyber Sleuth – Hacker's Memory Original release dates: JP: December 14, 2017; WW: January 19, 2018	Release years by system: 2017 – PlayStation 4, PlayStation Vita; 2019 – Microsoft Windows, Nintendo Switch
Digimon Story: Cyber Sleuth – Hacker's Memory Original release dates: JP: December 14, 2017; WW: January 19, 2018	Notes: Developed by Media.Vision
Digimon Story: Time Stranger Original release date(s): JP: October 2, 2025; WW: October 3, 2025	Release years by system: 2025 – PlayStation 5, Microsoft Windows, Xbox Series; 2026 – Nintendo Switch 2, Nintendo Switch
Digimon Story: Time Stranger Original release date(s): JP: October 2, 2025; WW: October 3, 2025	Notes: Developed by Media.Vision; Features the Olympos XII group of Digimon as the central characters.

=== Other role-playing games ===
Game	Details
Digimon Adventure: Anode Tamer Digimon Adventure: Cathode Tamer Digimon Adventure: Anode/Cathode Tamer Original release dates: JP: December 15, 1999 (Anode Tamer); JP: January 20, 2000 (Cathode Tamer); HKG: September 18, 2001 (Anode/Cathode Tamer)	Release years by system: 1999 – WonderSwan (Anode Tamer); 2000 – WonderSwan (Cathode Tamer); 2001 – WonderSwan Color (Anode/Cathode Tamer)
Digimon Adventure: Anode Tamer Digimon Adventure: Cathode Tamer Digimon Adventure: Anode/Cathode Tamer Original release dates: JP: December 15, 1999 (Anode Tamer); JP: January 20, 2000 (Cathode Tamer); HKG: September 18, 2001 (Anode/Cathode Tamer)	Notes: Developed by Bandai (Anode Tamer and Cathode Tamer) and SIMS Co., Ltd. (Anode/Cathode Tamer); Anode/Cathode Tamer is a Hong Kong-exclusive compilation of the Japan-exclusive Anode Tamer and Cathode Tamer
Digimon Adventure 02: Tag Tamers Original release date: JP: August 3, 2000	Release years by system: 2000 – WonderSwan
Digimon Adventure 02: Tag Tamers Original release date: JP: August 3, 2000	Notes: Developed by Bandai; Sold 34,142 copies in Japan in its first three weeks of release
Digimon Adventure 02: D1 Tamers Original release date: JP: December 9, 2000	Release years by system: 2000 – WonderSwan Color
Digimon Adventure 02: D1 Tamers Original release date: JP: December 9, 2000	Notes: Developed by Bandai; Sold 14,459 copies in Japan in its first day of release
Digimon Tamers: Pocket Culumon Original release date: JP: May 17, 2001	Release years by system: 2001 – PlayStation
Digimon Tamers: Pocket Culumon Original release date: JP: May 17, 2001	Notes: Developed by Bandai; Sold 3,821 copies in Japan in its first week of release
Digimon Tamers: Digimon Medley Original release date: JP: July 12, 2001	Release years by system: 2001 – WonderSwan Color
Digimon Tamers: Digimon Medley Original release date: JP: July 12, 2001	Notes: Developed by Inti Creates; Sold 12,884 copies in Japan in its first week of release
Digimon Tamers: Brave Tamers Original release date: JP: December 29, 2001	Release years by system: 2001 – WonderSwan Color
Digimon Tamers: Brave Tamers Original release date: JP: December 29, 2001	Notes: Developed by Bandai
Digital Monster: D-Project Original release date: JP: August 3, 2002	Release years by system: 2002 – WonderSwan Color
Digital Monster: D-Project Original release date: JP: August 3, 2002	Notes: Developed by Bandai
Digimon Adventure Original release date: JP: January 17, 2013	Release years by system: 2013 – PlayStation Portable
Digimon Adventure Original release date: JP: January 17, 2013	Notes: Developed by Prope and published by Namco Bandai Games; Based on the Digimon Adventure anime series
Digimon Survive Original release date: JP: July 28, 2022; WW: July 29, 2022	Release years by system: 2022, PlayStation 4, Nintendo Switch, Xbox One, Windows
Digimon Survive Original release date: JP: July 28, 2022; WW: July 29, 2022	Notes: Visual novel combined with a tactical role-playing battle system.

== Fighting games ==
Game	Details
Digimon Battle Spirit Original release dates: JP: October 6, 2001; NA: January 13, 2003; PAL: September 5, 2003	Release years by system: 2001 – WonderSwan Color; 2003 – Game Boy Advance
Digimon Battle Spirit Original release dates: JP: October 6, 2001; NA: January 13, 2003; PAL: September 5, 2003	Notes: Developed by Dimps; Plot holds that an "unknown Digimon" is born at the corner of the Digital World and begins to terrorize that world as well as a fictional version of Earth. The Digimon and Tamers from both worlds band together to fight it; Titled Digimon Tamers: Battle Spirit in Japan; Sold 25,296 copies in Japan in its first two weeks of release
Digimon Rumble Arena Original release dates: JP: December 6, 2001; NA: February 20, 2002; PAL: July 15, 2002	Release years by system: 2001 – PlayStation
Digimon Rumble Arena Original release dates: JP: December 6, 2001; NA: February 20, 2002; PAL: July 15, 2002	Notes: Developed by Bandai; Pits 24 different Digimon from the anime against each other; The 2.5D style of gameplay closely mirrors the Nintendo 64 game Super Smash Bros.; Titled Digimon Tamers: Battle Evolution in Japan
Digimon Tamers: Battle Spirit Ver. 1.5 Original release date: JP: April 27, 2002	Release years by system: 2002 – WonderSwan Color
Digimon Tamers: Battle Spirit Ver. 1.5 Original release date: JP: April 27, 2002	Notes: Developed by Bandai
Digimon Battle Spirit 2 Original release dates: JP: December 7, 2002; NA: September 24, 2003; PAL: August 27, 2004	Release years by system: 2002 – WonderSwan Color; 2003 – Game Boy Advance
Digimon Battle Spirit 2 Original release dates: JP: December 7, 2002; NA: September 24, 2003; PAL: August 27, 2004	Notes: Developed by Dimps; Based on the Digimon Frontier anime series.; Titled Battle Spirits: Digimon Frontier in Japan
Digimon Rumble Arena 2 Original release dates: JP: July 29, 2004; NA: September 6, 2004; PAL: October 15, 2004	Release years by system: 2004 – GameCube, PlayStation 2, Xbox
Digimon Rumble Arena 2 Original release dates: JP: July 29, 2004; NA: September 6, 2004; PAL: October 15, 2004	Notes: Developed by Black Ship Games; Sequel to Digimon Rumble Arena with increased interactivity in the environments; Titled Digimon Battle Chronicle in Japan
Digimon All-Star Rumble Original release date(s): NA: November 11, 2014; PAL: November 14, 2014	Release years by system: 2014 – PlayStation 3, Xbox 360
Digimon All-Star Rumble Original release date(s): NA: November 11, 2014; PAL: November 14, 2014	Notes: Developed by Prope

== Spin-offs ==
Game	Details
Digimon Digital Card Battle Original release dates: JP: December 22, 2000; NA: June 28, 2001; PAL: July 2002	Release years by system: 2000 – PlayStation
Digimon Digital Card Battle Original release dates: JP: December 22, 2000; NA: June 28, 2001; PAL: July 2002	Notes: Developed by Bandai; Card battling game based on the official trading card game; Titled Digimon World: Digital Card Arena in Japan; Sold 20,255 copies in Japan in its first week of release
Digimon Park Original release date: JP: July 26, 2001	Release years by system: 2001 – PlayStation
Digimon Park Original release date: JP: July 26, 2001	Notes: Developed by Bandai; Consists of action-based minigames such as guitar duels, with a cast drawn from the anime; Requires the unsuccessful "Kids Station" peripheral
Digital Monster Card Game Ver. WonderSwan Color Original release date: JP: March 16, 2002	Release years by system: 2002 – WonderSwan Color
Digital Monster Card Game Ver. WonderSwan Color Original release date: JP: March 16, 2002	Notes: Developed by Bandai; Card battling game based on the official trading card game
Digimon Battle Online Original release dates: KOR: March 10, 2003; CHN: September 25, 2008; NA: April 14, 2010	Release years by system: 2003 – Microsoft Windows
Digimon Battle Online Original release dates: KOR: March 10, 2003; CHN: September 25, 2008; NA: April 14, 2010	Notes: Developed by Digitalic Co., Ltd.; Free online-based MMORPG with a plot drawn from the Digimon Tamers canon. Players control Tamers attempting to save Earth from evil Digimon; Contains approximately 352 species of Digimon; Published in the People's Republic of China by CDC Games; Released in North America by WeMade Entertainment.; Titled Digimon RPG in South Korea.; Has over 3 million subscribers; Service terminated in English on April 25, 2013. Revived in English in July 2022.; At some point, MOVEGAMES took over development.
Digimon Racing Original release dates: JP: April 1, 2004; PAL: April 30, 2004; NA: September 13, 2004	Release years by system: 2004 – Game Boy Advance
Digimon Racing Original release dates: JP: April 1, 2004; PAL: April 30, 2004; NA: September 13, 2004	Notes: Developed by Griptonite Games; Racing and action game featuring eleven Digimon from the anime as player characters
Digimon Jintrix Original release date: JP: February 25, 2011	Release years by system: 2011 – Microsoft Windows
Digimon Jintrix Original release date: JP: February 25, 2011	Notes: Developed by Bandai.; Free online-based collectible card game.; Service terminated on September 28, 2012.
Digimon Masters Original release date: KOR: July 27, 2009; US: October 20, 2011	Release years by system: 2009 – Microsoft Windows
Digimon Masters Original release date: KOR: July 27, 2009; US: October 20, 2011	Notes: Developed by MOVEGAMES.; English version published by Joymax from 2011–2016. MOVEGAMES took over publishing rights when Masters was released on Steam.; Free online-based MMORPG
Digimon Universe Appli Monsters Original release date: JP: December 1, 2016	Release years by system: 2016 – Nintendo 3DS
Digimon Universe Appli Monsters Original release date: JP: December 1, 2016	Notes: Developed by Bandai Namco
Digimon Super Rumble Original release date: KOR: November 25, 2021; WW: July 31, 2025	Release years by system: 2021 – Microsoft Windows
Digimon Super Rumble Original release date: KOR: November 25, 2021; WW: July 31, 2025	Notes: Developed by MOVEGAMES.; Free online-based MMORPG

== Others ==
Game	Details
Digital Monster Ver. S: Digimon Tamers Original release date: JP: September 23, 1998	Release years by system: 1998 – Sega Saturn
Digital Monster Ver. S: Digimon Tamers Original release date: JP: September 23, 1998	Notes: Developed by TOSE, published by Bandai; A simulation video game based on Bandai's Digimon virtual pet toys.; First video game based on the franchise
Digital Monster Ver. WonderSwan Original release date: JP: March 25, 1999	Release years by system: 1999 – WonderSwan
Digital Monster Ver. WonderSwan Original release date: JP: March 25, 1999	Notes: Developed by Bandai; A simulation game based on Bandai's Digimon virtual pet toys.
Digital Partner Original release date: JP: May 25, 2000	Release years by system: 2000 – WonderSwan
Digital Partner Original release date: JP: May 25, 2000	Notes: Developed by Bandai; Also known as Digimon Adventure 02: Digital Partner
Digivice Ver. Portable Original release date: JP: January 17, 2013	Release years by system: 2013 – PlayStation Portable
Digivice Ver. Portable Original release date: JP: January 17, 2013	Notes: Developed by Prope and published by Namco Bandai Games; A simulation video game based on Bandai's Digimon virtual pet toys.; Released alongside Digimon Adventure. Those who pre ordered it received a free copy of this game as a bonus.

== Mobile ==
Game	Details
Digimon Collectors Original release date: JP: November 8, 2011	Release years by system: 2011 – Android OS, iOS
Digimon Collectors Original release date: JP: November 8, 2011	Notes: Developed by Bandai; Free-to-play Collectible Card game.; Service terminated July 31, 2014
Digimon Heroes! Original release dates: JP: December 3, 2012 (iOS), July 29, 2013 (Android); AU: June 28, 2015; NA: January 27, 2016; EU: January 27, 2016	Release years by system: 2012 – iOS; 2013 – Android OS
Digimon Heroes! Original release dates: JP: December 3, 2012 (iOS), July 29, 2013 (Android); AU: June 28, 2015; NA: January 27, 2016; EU: January 27, 2016	Notes: Developed by Bandai; Free-to-play Collectible Card game.; Titled Digimon Crusader in Japan.; Uses original Japanese names for the Digimon, rather than their localised dub names.; Service terminated in Japan on November 30, 2016.; Service terminated Worldwide on December 31, 2017.
Digimon Fusion Fighters Original release date: NA: January 14, 2014	Release years by system: 2014 – Android OS, iOS
Digimon Fusion Fighters Original release date: NA: January 14, 2014	Notes: Developed by Bandai; Free-to-play Western exclusive RPG based on the Digimon Fusion anime series.
Digimon Soul Chaser Original release dates: KOR: December 9, 2015; CHN: August 7, 2016	Release years by system: 2015 – Android OS, iOS
Digimon Soul Chaser Original release dates: KOR: December 9, 2015; CHN: August 7, 2016	Notes: Developed by Netmaru. In May 2018, MOVEGAMES took over development and re-branded it as Digimon Soul Chaser: Season 2.; Free-to-play Gacha RPG released only in South Korea and China.
Digimon Links Original release dates: JP: March 24, 2016; WW: October 3, 2017	Release years by system: 2016 – Android OS, iOS
Digimon Links Original release dates: JP: March 24, 2016; WW: October 3, 2017	Notes: Developed by Bandai.; Free-to-play Gacha RPG.; Titled Digimon Linkz in Japan.; Service terminated Worldwide on July 30, 2019.
Digimon ReArise Original release dates: JP: June 25, 2018; NA: October 7, 2019; EU: October 9, 2019	Release years by system: 2018 – Android OS, iOS
Digimon ReArise Original release dates: JP: June 25, 2018; NA: October 7, 2019; EU: October 9, 2019	Notes: Developed by Bandai.; Free-to-play Gacha RPG.; Service terminated Worldwide on April 21, 2022.
Digimon Encounters Original release date: CHN: November 28, 2018	Release years by system: 2018 – Android OS, iOS
Digimon Encounters Original release date: CHN: November 28, 2018	Notes: Developed by Chengdu Momo Technology Company Limited.; Free-to-play Gacha RPG released only in China.; Introduces an official Digimon species, Blucomon (and its digivolution line), the first Digimon to debut in a game not released in Japan.; Service terminated November 17, 2020
App Monster - Defense Original release date: KOR: June 27, 2019	Release years by system: 2019 – Android OS, iOS
App Monster - Defense Original release date: KOR: June 27, 2019	Notes: Developed by MOVEGAMES.; Free-to-play Gacha based on the Digimon Universe: App Monsters anime series.; Released only in South Korea.; Service terminated June 30, 2020
Digimon New Century Original release date: CHN: October 21, 2021	Release years by system: 2021 – Android OS, iOS
Digimon New Century Original release date: CHN: October 21, 2021	Notes: Developed by Qixia Interactive Entertainment and Bandai Namco Entertainment Shanghai and published by Tencent; Free-to-play Gacha RPG released only in China.
Digimon UP Original release date: WW: July 15, 2026	Release years by system: 2026 – Android OS, iOS
Digimon UP Original release date: WW: July 15, 2026	Notes: Free-to-play game
Digimon Alysion Original release date: 2026	Release years by system: 2026 – Android OS, iOS
Digimon Alysion Original release date: 2026	Notes: Free-to-play collectible Card game based on the 2020 version of the Digimon Card Game.

== See also ==
- Digital Monster (1997 digital pet toy)
