= Digimon D-Cyber =

Comics

- Cover of D-cyber vol. 1 (2004 Rightman Publishing Ltd), art by Yu Yuen-wong

數碼暴龍
- Genre: Action/adventure, fantasy
- Author: Yuen Wong Yu
- Publisher: Rightman Publishing Ltd.
- Magazine: Co-co! Magazine
- Original run: 2004
- Collected volumes: 2

D-Cyber / Digimon D-Cyber (Chinese: 數碼暴龍) is a Chinese Digimon manhua, which was released by Rightman Publishing Ltd. in Hong Kong, China on 2004. It is based on the adventures of Lóng Zhìguāng, Fāng Shēngjiàn, Luò Huī, and a young girl named Āměi. It introduces the concept of X-antibody Digimon, but their origin is different from that in the Japanese Digimon Chronicle.

== Synopsis ==
Ten thousand years ago, a great and powerful Digimon was defeated and sealed away by the Royal Knights as the "Digi Core". Years later, a virus infected the digital world, leaving only those that possessed the X-Antibody remaining. The only members of the Royal Knights remaining are Omega of Power (Omnimon X), Duke of Courage (MedievalGallantmon/Gallantmon X), and Magna of Miracles (Magnamon X).

At the start of the series, the "God of Death" MetalPhantomon draws Lóng, Āměi, Fāng, and Luò into the digital world. Originally, Lóng is left alone with his Digimon (which starts out as a Dorumon), and has to battle his friends Luò and Fāng, who are under MetalPhantomon's control.

At one point, MetalPhantomon steals the "Dragon Spirit" of Lóng's partner, who is now a Dorumon. While MetalPhantomon uses it to revive the Digi-Core, Lóng, Luò, and Fāng learn from Omega of Power that they can get a new Dragon Spirit from Duke of Courage - with this, they can save Dorumon's life. But when they arrive in Duke's area of the Digital World, they are given a series of tests by Duke's servant, MameTyramon.

After completing the tests and battling Duke himself, they manage to earn Dorumon a new Dragon Spirit. However, now they must battle MetalPhantomon, who has resurrected the Digi-Core as Dexmon. In the end, Lóng and the others manage to save their friend Āměi, who was sealed inside Dexmon, and return to the real world.

== Characters ==
=== Humans and Digimon Partners ===
Zhìguāng Lóng

The main character and characteristic "goggle boy". Though somewhat irresponsible and foolhardy, he manages to come through for his friends, as well as save his Digimon when his Dragon Spirit is lost.

Dorumon

Dorumon is Zhìguāng's Digimon partner, and gets very angry when his partner does not live up to his responsibility for him. In the end, he is revealed to actually be Alphamon, the leader of the Royal Knights from long ago.
- Dorumon is initially only shown becoming a Dorugoramon, and later, a DexDoruGreymon and then DexDorugoramon through Death-X Evolution. After losing his Dragon Spirit, he becomes Grademon, then Alphamon and lastly Alphamon (Ouryuuken) in the final battle.

Fāng Shēngjiàn

Zhìguāng and Luò's friend. Temporarily controlled by MetalPhantomon. Fāng believes that wisdom is just as good as raw power, and is a good strategist.

Ryudamon

Fāng's partner. He is very respectful, and calls Fāng his master.
- Fāng's partner is originally a Gaiomon, but is defeated by Zhìguāng's DexDorugoramon. It reverts into a Digi-Egg, and temporarily becomes a DexDorugamon through Death-X Evolution. Finally, it is revived as a Ryudamon. Ryudamon eventually becomes a HisyaRumon, and after receiving power from the Royal Knights, gains the ability to become Ouryumon. Then, finally, Ouryumon becomes the blade that allows Alphamon Ouryuken to destroy Dexmon.

Luò Huī

Luò is the young friend of Zhìguāng and Fāng. Short and timid, but manages to rise to the occasion in several instances. He was briefly controlled by MetalPhantomon.

Agumon X

Agumon X is Luò's Digimon partner, and is sometimes played up for comic relief.
- When Luò is controlled by MetalPhantomon, Agumon X first appears as a MetalGreymon X. Later, Luò manages to help it become a Greymon X and after receiving power from the Royal Knights, Agumon gains the ability to become an Omekamon.

Āměi

Zhìguāng, Fāng, and Luò's friend. She was sealed within Dexmon until she was rescued by Zhìguāng and Grademon.

=== Royal Knights ===
After the sealing away of the Digi-Core 10,000 years ago, and the coming of the Virus, there are only three of these Digimon left. At the end of the series, Dorumon is revealed to be their leader, Alphamon.

Omnimon X

Omnimon X is referred to here as "Omega of Power", first appearing in Chapter 3 :"Fāng's Trap". One of only three remaining Royal Knights of thirteen originally. Fāng was under the control of a MetalPhantomon in Chapter 2 and Zhìguāng receives a message from Fāng on his Digital Monster D-Cyber Version 1.0 to head North and find him at MetalPhantomon's lair. A battle ensues and Luò tells Zhìguāng not to argue with Fāng and that he wants to remain in the Digital World, believing Fāng that MetalPhantomon will give them power. Zhìguāng strikes Luò and tells him to wake up. In doing so, Luò is rendered unconscious. Fāng believes Luò murdered and orders his Digimon to come out, a Gaiomon (Samudramon in the Digital Monster D-Cyber Special Limited Edition and GaiOumon in the Digimon Chronicle). Zhìguāng's Digimon Death-X Evolves to a DexDoruGreymon in his grief and guilt. In trying to recover Luò, Zhìguāng realizes Fāng's trap and that the Luò before him is not the real one, an illusion. Fāng switched the real one to anger Zhìguāng. Fāng says he will send him to the "God of Death" (MetalPhantomon), his Gaiomon is however defeated by Zhìguāng's DexDorugoramon, who in his anger, caused the evolution but his Digimon is on a rampage. Afterwards, Zhìguāng recovers the real Luò but is interrupted in seeing Omnimon X before them, asking "Who dares to break the peace of the Digital World?" He smelled the scent of DexDorugoramon's Digi-Core and goes on to say he defeated the same evil Digi-Core ten thousand years ago and orders the children to leave. Omnimon X engages DexDorugoramon in battle and Fāng is freed of MetalPhantomon's control. Omnimon X discovers DexDorugoramon to be stronger than he was ten thousand years ago and inflicts insufficient damage with his Garuru Cannon even at a close distance. As Omnimon X invokes his Grey Sword, Zhìguāng's body produces a huge energy sphere and Omnimon X realizes it is Zhìguāng transferring power to DexDorugoramon making him seem invincible, although unknowingly. Omnimon X attempts to then kill Zhìguāng but Fāng says they can still control DexDorugoramon and tells Zhìguāng to take the power back. Zhìguāng then strikes DexDorugoramon and calms him but MetalPhantomon arrives and steals his Dragon Spirit to revive the Digi-Core of a Dexmon. Omnimon X attempts to prevent it but MetalPhantomon escapes. Omnimon X says Zhìguāng's Dorumon's body will disappear in ten days and even he can not save him. He tells them to head through the Valley of the Morning Dragon and to the Jade Waterfall to obtain a new one from a Royal Knight called "Duke", a MedievalGallantmon. He then attempts to track MetalPhantomon. While he is able to follow him to where Dexmon is sealed away as the Digicore, he is unable to prevent Dexmon's revival nor defeat him in battle. He does however eventually assist Alphamon (King Dragon) along with the others in defeating Dexmon when they arrive to help.

Duke of Courage

The 2nd Royal Knight, who can give Dorumon the new Dragon Spirit necessary to save his life. After completing several tests, Zhìguāng and the others earn the right to see him. However, he only gives them a new Dragon Spirit after they prove themselves in battle against him. Afterwards, he transforms from MedievalGallantmon into a Gallantmon X to fight Dexmon.

Magna of Miracles

A Magnamon X. Appears briefly to help Fāng and Luò gain new powers to help fight Dexmon, and later, his "Power of Miracles" helps Zhìguāng return to the real world.

MameTyramon

Not actually a Royal Knight, but one of Duke's servants. A somewhat vicious and arrogant character, he subjects the kids to several tests. When his helmet is destroyed, he gains greater speed and power.

=== Villains ===
Kuwagamon X

MegaSeadramon X & GigaSeadramon A GigaSeadramon is furious with the children when Luò's Greymon X destroys his brother MegaSeadramon X. He appeared soon after when MegaSeadramon X was defeated. GigaSeadramon attacks Luò, and Zhìguāng has Dorimon digivolve to Grademon and defeat him.

SkullBaluchimon

Metal Phantomon

"The God of Death", who originally pulls the kids into the Digital World so he can use their powers for himself. He steals Dorumon's Dragon Spirit to revive Dexmon, but is ultimately absorbed by the ancient Digimon himself.

Dexmon

The final and main villain, the true form of the Digi-Core who was sealed away by the Royal Knights 10,000 years ago. He is revived by Metal Phantomon, and after absorbing the evil Digimon, gains power and the ability to think for himself. In the end, he fuses with the Digital World, forcing Alphamon to "purify him" and leave him in the center of the digital world.

== Other ==
=== Evolution/Digivolution ===
In the series, evolution (or Digivolution) is achieved through the generation of "energy spheres", which is formed from the human partner's will. However, if there are negative emotions involved, it can cause the partner to evolve into a savage version in a process called "Death-X (Dex) Evolution." The most notable example of this is when Lóng's Dorumon warp evolves into a DexDorugoramon.

=== D-Cyber Digivice ===
The Digivice for this series is the D-Cyber. The only notable feature of the portrayal of this Digivice is that a Digimon's special attack is triggered by "pendulum shaking" on the part of the human partner.https://www.ebay.ca/sch/i.html?_sacat=0&_nkw=digimon+d+cyber
