= Digimon Rumble Arena =

2001 video game

- North American box art with Guilmon and Veemon
- Developer: Bandai (Note: In association with Hudson Soft)
- Publisher: Bandai
- Directors: Ayano Fujiwara; Yukio Umematsu
- Producers: Takashi Aoyama; Hirotaka Watanabe; Atsushi Minowa
- Designers: Hiroyuki Seki; Yasuaki Takahashi; Yutaka Sato
- Programmers: Masahiro Tobita; Takayuki Hanamasu
- Series: Digimon
- Platform: PlayStation
- Release: JP: December 6, 2001; NA: February 20, 2002; PAL: July 5, 2002
- Genre: Fighting
- Modes: Single-player, multiplayer

Digimon Rumble Arena (Note: Known in Japan as Digimon Tamers Battle Evolution (Japanese: デジモンテイマーズ バトルエボリューション, Hepburn: Dejimon Teimāzu Batoru Eboryūshon)) is a 2001 fighting video game developed and published by Bandai. It is part of a video game series connected to the Digimon franchise and showcases the titular creatures within the context of a fighting video game. The player controls one of several Digimon and engages in combat with other Digimon within a variety of settings. Apart from the central fighting gameplay, a trio of mini-games are available upon the single-player campaign's completion.

Bandai produced the game under the oversight of Hudson Soft, and it was released for the PlayStation in Japan in 2001, with a North American and European release following in 2002; its late release in the console's life cycle resulted in minimal press coverage. Digimon Rumble Arena received mixed reviews from critics, who noted the game's similarity to Super Smash Bros., and believed that the gameplay, while simple and accessible, lacked polish. A sequel, Digimon Rumble Arena 2, was released in 2004, while a spiritual successor to the first two installments, Digimon All-Star Rumble, was released in 2014.

== Gameplay ==
Gabumon (left) and Renamon (right) battle in an arena, with health bars and time remaining visible on the lower part of the screen.

Digimon Rumble Arena is a fighting game that is set within the universe of the Digimon media franchise and features a gameplay style closely resembling that of Super Smash Bros., particularly in its single-button attacks. In the game's single-player mode, the player controls a Digimon and fights a series of computer-controlled opponents, unlocking new characters in the process. Clearing the single-player campaign unlocks three mini-games that can be played against a computer-controlled or human opponent. The mini-games consist of "Target Games", in which characters toss a ball to collect gems; "Digivolve Race", in which characters punch a speed bag to fill a gauge; and "Basketball Game", in which characters shoot baskets into a moving hoop. The two-player mode allows two human players to compete against each other, and the "Vs. Computer" mode allows the player to face the computer-controlled opponent of their choice.

Digimon Rumble Arena initially includes nine playable characters out of a total of 24. The roster is composed of characters featured in the anime series Digimon Adventure, Digimon Adventure 02, and Digimon Tamers. Each character is associated with one of three "specialties"—fire, nature, or water—which makes them stronger against or more vulnerable to certain fighters. The gameplay primarily consists of two Digimon fighting one-on-one in one of seven themed arenas. Characters can jump, guard, and have a series of basic attacks as well as two special techniques. Landing successful hits against the opponent or guarding against attacks will gradually increase a gauge that allows the player character to undergo "Digivolution"—a transformation into a more powerful character—when it is filled. In this state, the character can execute a special technique that empties the gauge and returns the character to their previous form.

The game's arenas feature interactive elements and traps (such as falling rocks or lava flows) that players can avoid or use to their advantage. Matches may be timed, with the winner being determined by which character has more health remaining, though the time limit can be deactivated in the options menu. During a match, items and cards will randomly appear that are either beneficial or detrimental to the player, such as increasing or decreasing the player's Digivolution gauge or attack strength.

== Development and release ==
Digimon Rumble Arena was produced by Bandai under the direction of Ayano Fujiwara and Yukio Umematsu of Hudson Soft. The game was designed by Hiroyuki Seki, Yasuaki Takahashi, and Yutaka Sato, and was programmed by Masahiro Tobita and Takayuki Hanamasu. The animated opening sequence was created by Toei Animation's digital contents department. The English voice acting was recorded in the studio Oracle Post and directed by Mary Elizabeth McGlynn. The game was released as Digimon Tamers Battle Evolution in Japan on December 6, 2001. It was released as Digimon Rumble Arena in North America on February 20, 2002, and in Europe on July 5 of the same year.

== Reception ==
Reception

Aggregate score
Aggregator	Score
Metacritic	64/100

Review scores
Publication	Score
Electronic Gaming Monthly	5.5/10, 5/10, 5/10
GamePro	14.5/20
Jeuxvideo.com	12/20
Official U.S. PlayStation Magazine	3.5/5

Because Digimon Rumble Arena was released late in the PlayStation's life cycle, it received little coverage from critics. It garnered a 64/100 aggregate score (indicating "mixed to average reviews") from five reviewers on Metacritic, with most of them pointing out the gameplay's resemblance to Super Smash Bros. Jeanne Kim, Chris Johnston, and James Mielke of Electronic Gaming Monthly faulted the game's lack of originality, but opined that it fulfilled a single purpose of allowing fans to fight Digimon in real time. Kim, along with Fennec Fox of GamePro, regarded the game as a solid fighter, with the latter concluding that the game was one of the better budget titles for the PlayStation, though he lamented the lack of four-player gameplay and substantial features compared to Super Smash Bros.

Though Johnston determined the game to be the best Digimon title he had played, he and Sam Kennedy of Official U.S. PlayStation Magazine criticized the awkward controls, stiff combat, and uneven character balance. Additionally, Johnston complained of the overly difficult final boss and inability for two human players to select the same character in two-player gameplay. However, Kennedy and Kim commended the game's accessibility, which Kim attributed to the simplified combat mechanics, though Mielke identified the same trait as a weakness. Kennedy also found enjoyment in the multiplayer experience and unlockable content. While Romendil of Jeuxvideo.com observed that the game "daringly draws on the classics of the fighting game", she felt that the result's success was hampered by major handicaps; namely, she castigated the gameplay for its imprecision and limited move sets, remarking that evading a string of combos from an opponent was "often impossible". Akira Fujita, in a preview for IGN, deemed the controls responsive, but felt that the execution of the Digivolution mechanic was imperfect, explaining that the attacks by non-evolved Digimon were sometimes faster and more effective than the slower special techniques of the evolved Digimon.

Fujita considered the graphics to be satisfactory for a PlayStation game. Fennec Fox appreciated the presentation's recreation of the anime's atmosphere, and was surprised by the smooth character animation. Kennedy and Mielke were impressed by the ambitiousness of the arenas, though Mielke felt that they affected the game's graphics by rendering them "grainy and unkempt". Romendil respected the wide range of colors and effects as well as the lack of slowdown, but wished for more arena variety. Fennec Fox dismissed the music as "typical generic anime stuff", and Romendil was disappointed by the "unremarkable" score and low variety of sound effects, adding that the voices were barely intelligible.

== Successors ==
A sequel, Digimon Rumble Arena 2, was released for the PlayStation 2, GameCube, and Xbox consoles in 2004. The game features a roster of 45 playable characters representing the first four seasons of the anime series, fully destructible environments, and four-player gameplay. It was unveiled at the 2004 Electronic Entertainment Expo, and received mixed reviews from critics upon release. Digimon All-Star Rumble, a spiritual successor to the Digimon Rumble Arena games, was released for the PlayStation 3 and Xbox 360 consoles in 2014. The game, which features a roster of 32 playable characters representing the first six seasons of the anime series, was poorly received by reviewers.
