= Digital Monster =

Digital pet

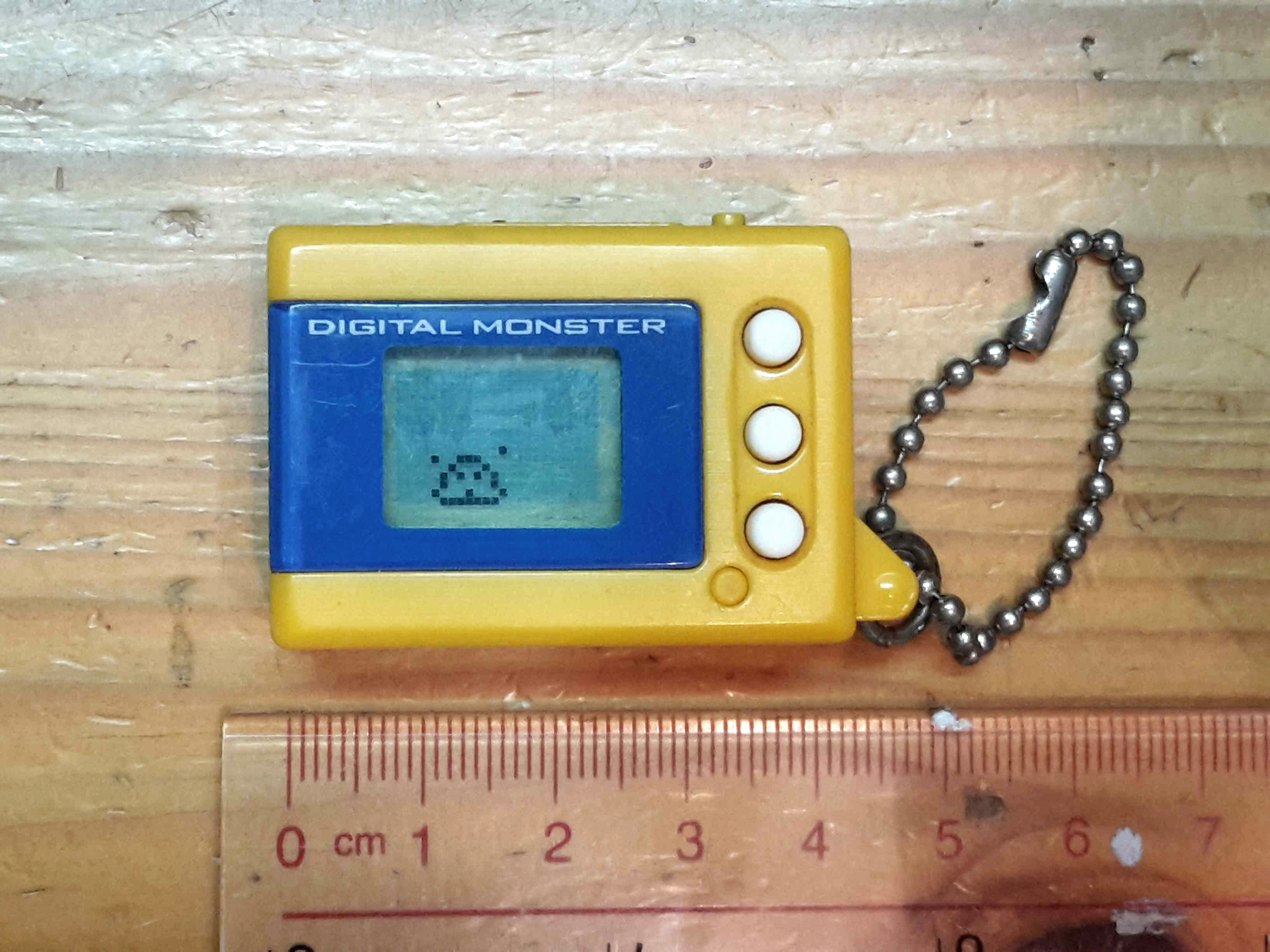
- A Digital Monster model (Mini Version 2)
- Type: Digital pet
- Company: Bandai
- Country: Japan
- Availability: 1997–present
- Official website

The Digital Monster^{JPN} is a digital pet created by WiZ and Bandai that spawned the Digimon franchise. It was released by Bandai in 1997, on June 26th in Japan, and on December 5th in North America, targeted at boys 8 years and older. It was similar to earlier virtual pets with the distinction of being a fighting pet that could connect with others like it.

The original Digital Monster model released in 1997 sold 14 million units worldwide, including 13 million in Japan and 1 million overseas, up until March 2004. By 2005, more than 24 million Digital Monster units had been sold worldwide.

In 2017, a 20th anniversary edition was released in Japan which allows the owner to choose from any of the eggs from the first five versions of the original toy, as well as several new ones unlocked through various methods. This edition was released worldwide in 2019, the anniversary of the franchise outside of its home country.

== History ==
Key figures involved in the development of the Digital Monster include Makoto Kitagawara and Kenji Watanabe of WiZ and Ayumu Horimura of Bandai. Kitagawara and Watanabe had been in WiZ's game department before being moved to the toy department. Once there Kitagawara helped with debugging and spec documents for a second generation of Tamagotchi, and that was when discussions for a male-oriented Tamagotchi began. Horimura would act as a supervisor during its development. The name for this new device started off as "Otokotchi" (おとこっち), but then it became "Capsule Zaurus" (カプセルザウルス) as it went through development. When the team found that the name "Capsule Zaurus" could be seen as infringement by other companies, the device was named the "Digital Monster". Watanabe contributed monster designs to the Digital Monster; he used drawings influenced from American comics such as Spawn and other artists like Simon Bisley and Mike Mignola. The first two monsters he designed were Tyranomon and Agumon.

== Gameplay ==
The Digimon game consists of the following functions:

- Checking the pet's status (age, weight, strength, hunger, and energy)
- Feeding the Digimon to increase the pet's fullness, strength, and energy
- Training the Digimon to lose weight and increase strength
- Battle mode (once activated, the owner can link their console to another owner's Digimon and begin a battle)
- Cleaning up the Digimon's droppings (leaving droppings uncleaned for too long causes the Digimon to become ill)
- Toggling the light. If the Digimon fell asleep and the light was never turned off, its overall condition (an unviewable stat) would decrease, and its chances of a high-power evolution would decrease.
- Healing the Digimon. If the Digimon got sick or injured in battle, it would have to be healed before it could battle again.

== Device operation ==
The original Digimon Device has three buttons and one reset button, located to the right of the screen. The top "A" button scrolls through the icons and options on the screens. The middle "B" button activates the selected function. The bottom "C" button cancels out whatever is on the screen. Additionally, Pressing "A" and "C" simultaneously toggles the sound, which mutes or unmutes the device. The reset button could only be pressed with a pen or other sharp object.

There is a metal contact on the edge of the device. Two Digimon Devices can send its Digimon to battle each other by aligning the metal contacts to come into contact with each other.

== Changes for US market ==
When the product was brought to the US, elements such as the "Megalithic Mainframe" were added to soften the concept of death (thus Digimon cannot die, but instead return to a fictional world). Devimon was renamed Darkmon and Monzaemon was renamed Teddymon. These names were never used in the franchise again, as the games and anime would use Devimon and Monzaemon.

== Digimon Pendulums ==
=== Original Pendulum series ===
In 1998, Bandai released a follow-up virtual pet series known as Pendulums which features higher evolution levels and is the first to introduce the Jogress function which enable combination between certain type of digimons. The pendulum is used to count the number of times the device has been shaken. Five versions of the Digimon Pendulum were released which is Nature Spirit for version 1, Deep Savers for version 2, Nightmare Soldier for version 3, Wind Guardian for version 4 and finally Metal Empire for version 5. Each of these being followed by a 0.5 version which contained a slightly altered character lineup. A Version 0 representing Virus Busters was also later released.

=== Pendulum Progress series ===
Pendulum Progress was the successor of the original Pendulum series. There are three in total; the Pendulum Progress is an upgrade similar to the Tamagotchi Connection. The character lineup on each is expanded and it retains the pendulum feature that became a series standard; it also has the ability to have the current monster fight a computer monster in battle as opposed to linking up with another device.

=== Pendulum X series ===
The successor of the Pendulum Progress, the Pendulum X series, was released in 2003. It combined the RPG elements of the Digivice games with the standard pet-raising. Unlike its predecessors, the Pendulum X line was accompanied by a story titled Digimon Chronicle (デジモンクロニクル, Dejimon Kuronikuru), which was told mostly through prose text interspersed with short, non-sequitur six-page manga comics printed in the booklets. There were four "chapters", one sold with each progressive version of the Pendulum X.

==== Plot ====
In this storyline, the Digital World is controlled by an intelligent computer named Yggdrasil. Digimon have multiplied so much that Yggdrasil is unable to handle the load and the Digital Hazard occurs. This leads to the creation of the "New Digital World", which consists of three layers known as Urd (past), Versandi (present), and Skuld (future). Yggdrasil then lets loose the Project Ark as well as the X Program to eliminate any Digimon it no longer wants. However, some Digimon adapt by obtaining a program called the X-Antibody, which strengthens them, changes their appearances, and immunizes them against the X Program. Yggdrasil sends in the thirteen Royal Knights to keep order in the Digital World. After that, two human boys, Kouta and Yuuji find their way into the Digital World and meet their respective partner Digimon, Dorumon and Ryudamon. Kouta and Yuuji resist Yggdrasil and the Royal Knights. 15 years later, in 2019, the Manga received a sequel titled "Digimon Chronicle X", which followed the story of the Royal Knights and Seven Great Demon Lords fighting against each other in their X forms.

== Digimon Mini ==
The Digimon Mini is modeled similarly to the original pets but at a much smaller size. The character set has been minimized and functions are limited. For example, there is no status screen to view the Digimon's hunger. The player must simply feed it when it is hungry.

The Mini also uses the three-prong connector; it is thus compatible with the Pendulum X, the Digimon Accelerator, and the Digimon iC. The third Mini updates the character roster, expanding the available Digimon from 13 to 18.

== WonderSwan ==
Digital Monster Ver. WonderSwan is a Japanese handheld version of the original Digimon pet for the WonderSwan. It includes all of the original Digimon from the first four virtual pet devices and the first pendulum device. In this game the player can have up to eight different Digimon with them at a time. It has computer-controlled opponents to battle with. The game has the ability to connect to another WonderSwan through a special link cable. It can also hook up to the original pets through a Digimon "dock N rock" connector.

== Digimon 20th anniversary ==
=== Digimon Original 20th anniversary ===
On 26 June 2017, the 20th anniversary edition of the original Digimon virtual pet was released in Japan. This evolved version has several new functions including Web Link and allowing you to simultaneously train two Digimon. It is also available in two colors: original brown and gray. In addition to versions 1 through 5 of Digital Monster, this version includes 134 trainable Digimon, and a total of 154 appearing Digimon. Special Digi-Eggs have also been added that can be obtained by meeting certain conditions (Digi-Eggs are the first step in the bringing-up of your Digimon), as well as the ability to obtain Omnimon by fusing the Original Brown-exclusive Agumon and Original Grey-exclusive Gabumon.

In November 2017, three new additional colors of the 20th anniversary edition of the Digimon virtual pet were released in Japan using the colors of Omegamon, Alphamon and Zubamon. Omegamon Color comes with exclusive Coronamon Digi-egg, Alphamon Color comes with exclusive Lunamon Digi-egg, and Zubamon Color comes with exclusive Meicoomon Digi-egg. Connecting the first wave of the 20th anniversary edition of the Digimon virtual pet with the second wave of the 20th anniversary edition of the Digimon virtual pet will unlock Dorumon Egg on both devices.

The 20th anniversary edition of the Digimon virtual pet was released worldwide in 2019, the anniversary of the franchise outside of its home country. The English release is available in five versions with several colors each.

=== Digimon Pendulum 20th anniversary ===
In June 2018, a 20th anniversary edition of the Digimon Pendulum series was released. It is currently available exclusively in Japan.

== Digimon X ==
In March 2019, Bandai released Digimon X, an updated version of the original Digimon virtual pet that combines features of the 20th anniversary release and the Pendulum X series. This new version features RPG-like gameplay that allows Digimon to earn experience points and level up through battles. The English language release was in October 2021 and is available in 2 versions with 2 colors each.

On November 16, 2019, Bandai released Digimon X Version 2 in Japan, a version of Digimon X with new roster featuring Seven Great Demon Lords Digimon. The English language release was in March 2022 and is available in 2 versions with 2 colors each. When English language Digimon X Version 2 released there was a programming glitch that resulted in the incorrect Digimon Characters appearing, causing Bandai America to recall the products.

In March 2020, Bandai released Digimon X Version 3 in Japan. Digimon X Version 3 featuring 13 Holy Knight Digimon and their final battle against Seven Great Demon Lords Digimon. The devices remain exclusives for Japanese region.

In 2023, Bandai America launched four new color variations of the Digimon X virtual pet devices. These include translucent red and gold, translucent purple and silver, metallic gray and gold, and metallic navy and silver. The updated devices feature the Dice Roll Attack, Quest Mode, and various evolution paths, allowing users to train and battle their digital companions. The new Digimon X units are available at major retailers like GameStop, Amazon, and Entertainment Earth.

== Digimon Pendulum Z ==
In November 2020, the Pendulum Z series was released. It is available exclusively in Japan.

== Notes ==
デジタルモンスター (Dejitaru Monsutā)
