= Bandai Namco Forge Digitals =

Japanese video game studio

Bandai Namco Forge Digitals Inc.

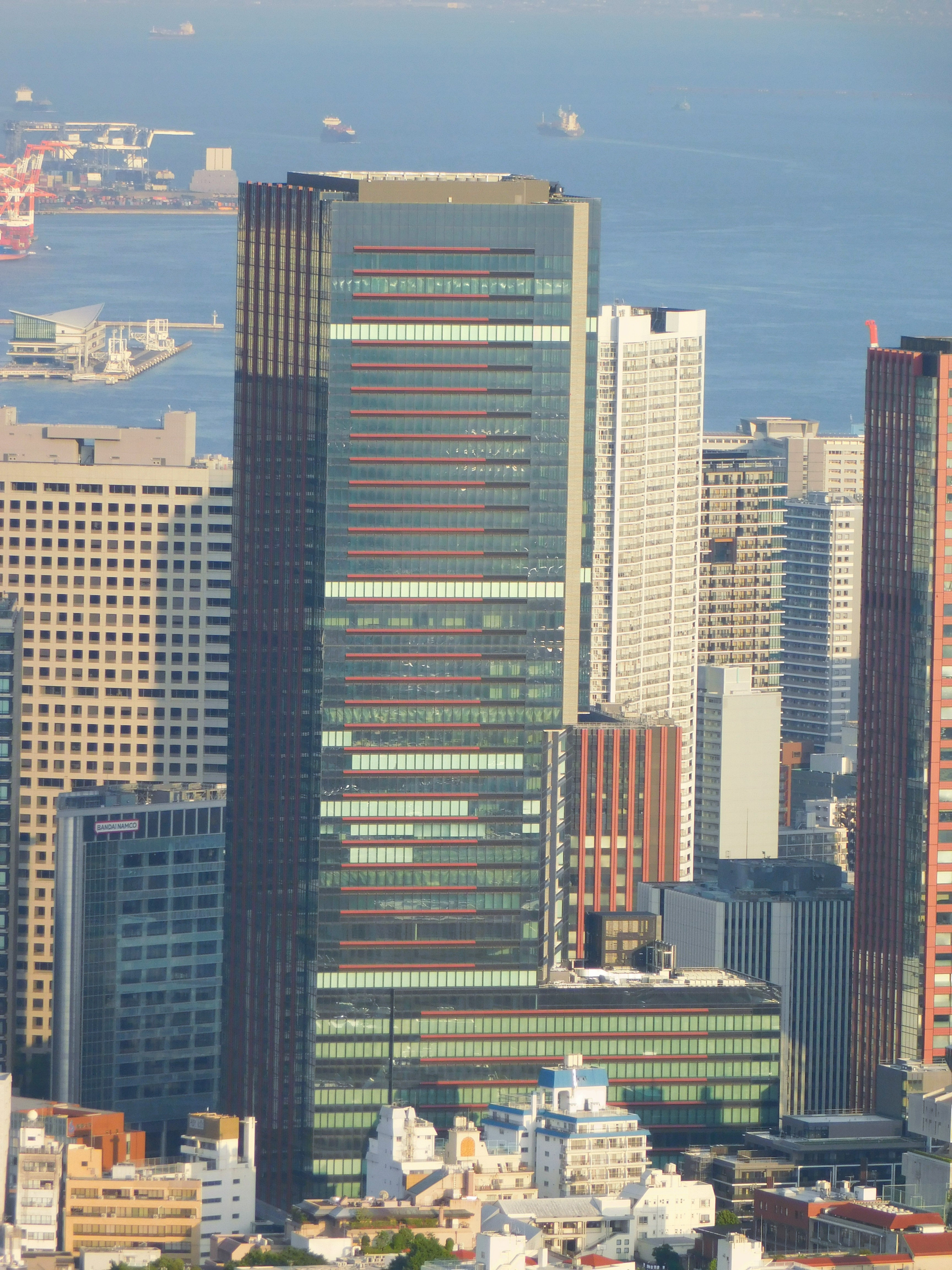
- Headquarters in Minato, Tokyo
- Native name: バンダイナムコフォージデジタルズ
- Formerly: Banpre Kikaku Co., Ltd. (1994-1997); Banpresoft Co., Ltd. (1997-2011); B. B. Studio Co., Ltd. (2011-2025)
- Type: Subsidiary
- Industry: Video games
- Predecessor: BEC
- Founded: February 1994; 32 years ago
- Headquarters: Mita, Minato, Tokyo, Japan
- Key people: Kazutoshi Yanagida; (president and CEO)
- Products: Digimon series; Gundam series; Super Robot Wars series
- Revenue: ¥200 million (US$1.26 million)
- Number of employees: 195 (2024)
- Parent: Banpresto; (1994–2008); Bandai Namco Entertainment; (2008–2024); Bandai Namco Studios; (2024–present)
- Website: fd.bandainamco.jp

Bandai Namco Forge Digitals Inc., formerly known as B.B. Studio Co., Ltd. (Note: Japanese: 株式会社B.B.スタジオ, Hepburn: Kabushiki-gaisha B.B. Sutajio), is a Japanese video game development company. The company is a result of a merger between BEC and Banpresoft by their parent company, Bandai Namco Entertainment.

== History ==
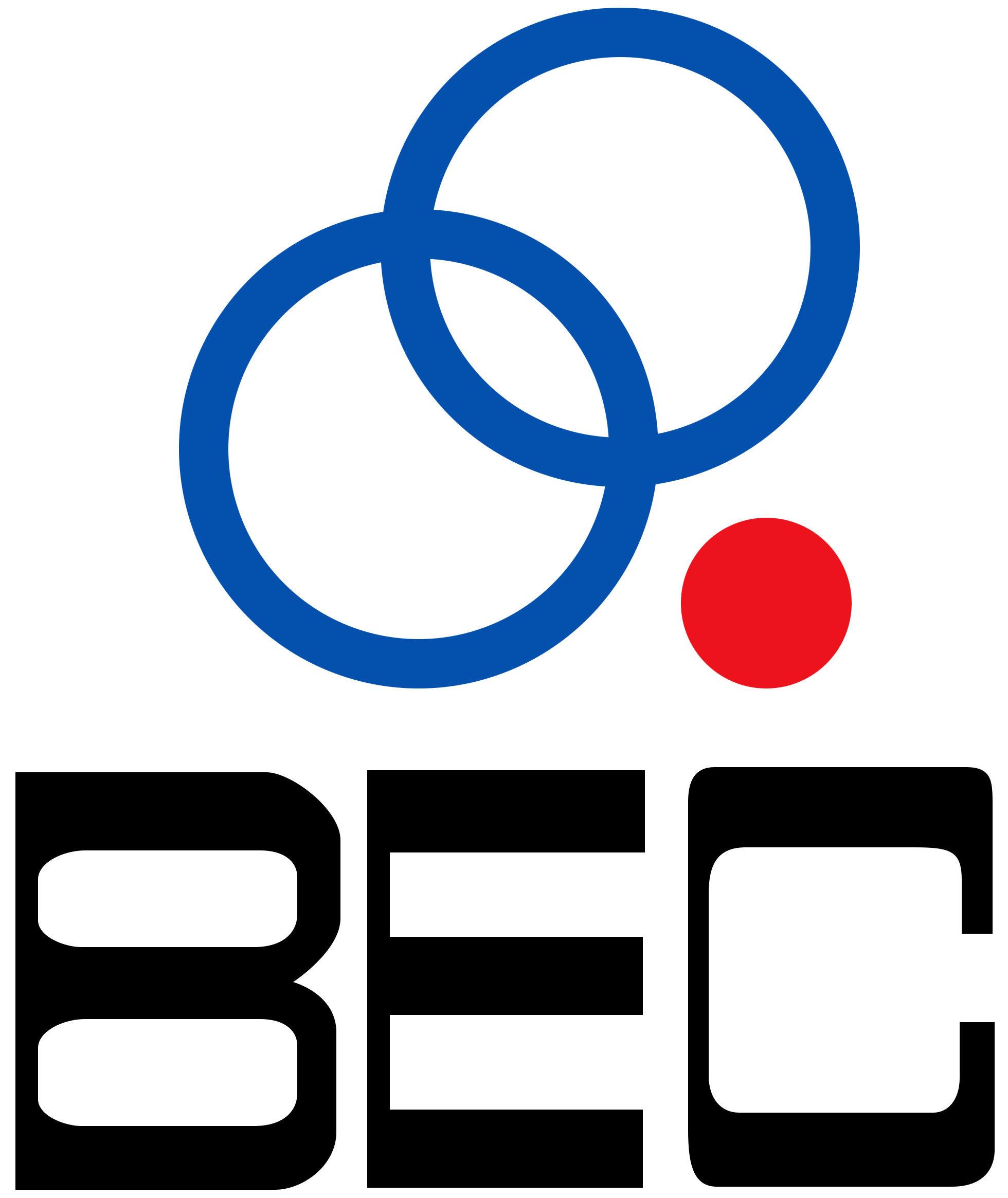
The logo for BEC.

BEC Co., Ltd. (株式会社ベック, Kabushiki-gaisha Bekku), short for Bandai Entertainment Company, was a joint venture by Bandai and Human for video game development. They were best known for developing licensed video games for Bandai including Digimon, Dragon Ball Z and Mobile Suit Gundam.

Bandai eventually took full control of BEC, after Human went bankrupt in 2000, and once Bandai and Namco merged to create Bandai Namco Holdings, BEC became a video game development subsidiary for the merged company.

Banpre Kikaku Co., Ltd. (株式会社バンプレ企画, Kabushiki-gaisha Banpure Kikaku) was a subsidiary of Banpresto that developed video games. Its name was changed to Banpresoft Co., Ltd. (株式会社バンプレソフト, Kabushiki-gaisha Banpuresofuto) in March 1997.

In April 1998, Banpresoft launched its internal development division, leading to the production of titles such as Super Robot Wars Alpha and subsequent entries in the Super Robot Wars series. The company continued to expand, increasing its capital to 200 million yen in June 2002 and relocating to Komagata, Taito-ku, Tokyo in July 2005.

By 2007, Banpresoft restructured its development teams, transferring non-Super Robot Wars projects (Summon Night, Ar tonelico, etc.) to Banpresto’s Consumer Division. In May 2007, the company moved to Higashi-Shinagawa, Shinagawa-ku, Tokyo, inside the Bandai Namco Miraiken building.

In May 2008, Banpresoft became a wholly owned subsidiary of Bandai Namco Games.

On April 1, 2011, Bandai Namco merged BEC with Banpresoft in order to streamline and unify the Bandai gaming subsidiaries under one division, whilst the Banpresto brand was re-established as a toy company as part of Bandai Namco's toys and hobby business. B.B. Studio continued to use the Banpresto name on its products until February 2014, when it was decided that all Bandai Namco video games going forward would only carry the Bandai Namco name.

In July 2024, B.B. Studio, which was in the past a subsidiary of parent company Bandai Namco Entertainment became a direct subsidiary of Bandai Namco Studios.

On March 3, 2025, Bandai Namco announced the change of name from B.B. Studio to Bandai Namco Forge Digitals.

== List of games ==
Year	Title	Platform(s)	Ref.
2011	2nd Super Robot Wars Z Hakai-Hen	PlayStation Portable	
2011	Gundam Memories: Memory of the Battle	PlayStation Portable	
2011	Ambition of Mobile Suit Gundam: New Gillen	PlayStation Portable	
2011	Weiss Schwarz Portable	PlayStation Portable	
2012	Super Robot Wars OG Saga Masou Kishin II: Revelation of Evil God	PlayStation Portable	
2012	2nd Super Robot Wars Z Saisei-hen	PlayStation Portable	
2012	Mobile Suit Gundam: Battle Operation	PlayStation 3	
2012	Lagrange: Kamogawa Days	PlayStation 3	
2012	Super Robot Wars: Card Chronicle	iOS	
2012	2nd Super Robot Wars Original Generation	PlayStation 3	
2013	Gundam Card Battler	iOS	
2013	Magi: Hajimari no Meikyū	Nintendo 3DS	
2013	Dragon Ball Heroes: Ultimate Mission	Nintendo 3DS	
2013	Super Robot Wars UX	Nintendo 3DS	
2013	Super Robot Wars Operation Extend	PlayStation Portable	
2013	Super Robot Wars Original Generation Saga: Masō Kishin 3 – Pride of Justice	PlayStation 3, PlayStation Vita	
2013	Super Robot Wars Original Generation: Infinite Battle	PlayStation 3	
2014	Magi: A New World	Nintendo 3DS	
2014	3rd Super Robot Wars Z: Jigoku-hen	PlayStation 3, PlayStation Vita	
2014	Mobile Suit Gundam Side Stories	PlayStation 3	
2014	Super Robot Wars OG Saga: Masō Kishin F – Coffin of the End	PlayStation 3	
2015	3rd Super Robot Wars Z: Tengoku-hen	PlayStation 3, PlayStation Vita	
2015	SD Gundam Strikers	iOS	
2015	Super Robot Wars BX	Nintendo 3DS	
2015	Super Robot Wars X-Ω	iOS, Android	
2015	Gundam Battle Operation Next	PlayStation 3, PlayStation 4	
2016	Digimon World: Next Order	PlayStation Vita, PlayStation 4	
2016	Super Robot Wars Original Generation: The Moon Dwellers	PlayStation 3, PlayStation 4	
2017	Super Robot Wars V	PlayStation 4, PlayStation Vita, Nintendo Switch, PC	
2018	Full Metal Panic! Fight: Who Dares Wins	PlayStation 4	
2018	Mobile Suit Gundam Battle Operation 2	PlayStation 4, PlayStation 5	
2018	Super Robot Wars X	PlayStation 4, PlayStation VIta, Nintendo Switch, PC	
2019	Super Robot Wars T	PlayStation 4, Nintendo Switch	
2019	Disney Tsum Tsum Festival	Nintendo Switch	
2020	Namcot Collection	Nintendo Switch, PC, PlayStation 4, Xbox One	
2021	Super Robot Wars 30	Nintendo Switch, PC, PlayStation 4	
2021	Mobile Suit Gundam Battle Operation: Code Fairy	PlayStation 4, PlayStation 5	
2022	Dragon Quest X: Awakening of the Five Walkers Offline	Nintendo Switch, PlayStation 4, PlayStation 5, PC	
2025	Mobile Suit Gundam SEED: Battle Destiny Remastered	Nintendo Switch, PC	
2025	Super Robot Wars Y	Nintendo Switch, PC, PlayStation 5	
TBA	Mobile Suit Gundam Battle Operation 3	PC, PlayStation 5	
TBA	Super Robot Wars Z II: Ruination Remastered	TBA	
