= Digimon =

Japanese media franchise

- Official Digimon logo used since 2025
- Created by: Akiyoshi Hongo; WiZ
- Original work: Digital Monster (1997)
- Owners: Toei Animation; Bandai; Shueisha
- Years: 1997–present

Print publications
- Comics: See below

Films and television
- Film: See below
- Television series: See below

Games
- Traditional: See below
- Video game: See below

Miscellaneous
- Toys: D-Arts; S.H. Figuarts

Digimon (Japanese: デジモン, Hepburn: Dejimon; branded as Digimon: Digital Monsters), short for "Digital Monsters" (デジタルモンスター Dejitaru Monsutā), is a Japanese media franchise, which encompasses virtual pet toys, anime, manga, video games, films, and a trading card game. The franchise focuses on the eponymous creatures who inhabit a digital world, a parallel universe which originated from Earth's various communication networks.

The franchise was created in 1997 as Digital Monster, a series of digital pets, and it was intended as the masculine counterpart to Tamagotchi. The creatures were designed to look cute and iconic on the devices' small screens. Later developments had them created with a harder-edged style, which was influenced by American comics. The franchise gained momentum with an early video game, Digimon World, originally released in Japan in January 1999. Several anime series and films have been released; the video game series has expanded into various genres, such as role-playing, racing, fighting, and MMORPGs. The franchise generated over $500 million in sales by 2000. The franchise was at its most successful in the 2020s, with Bandai stating its video game and card game sales had made the 2020s the most successful period in the IP's history, even more than its initial boom with its 90s/2000s anime series.

== Conception and creation ==
English version logo for Digimon.

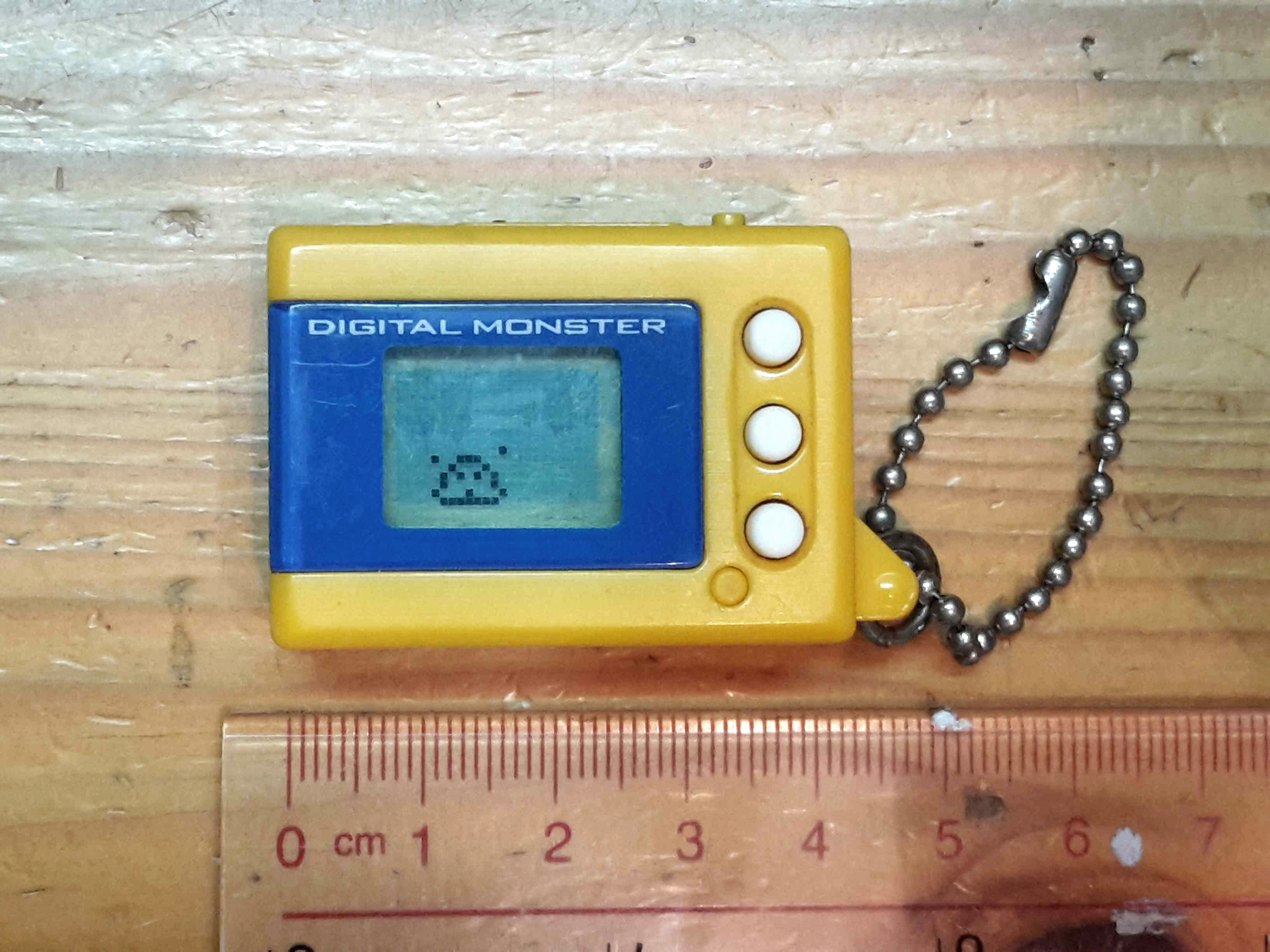
Virtual pet model distributed on the Japanese market by Bandai,

The Digimon franchise began as a series of virtual pets created by WiZ and Bandai, intended as a masculine counterpart to the more female-oriented Tamagotchi pets. It was released in June 1997 with the name Digital Monster, shortened to Digimon. This device shows to players a virtual pet composed entirely of data and designed to play and fight. In February 1998, the DigiMon fighting game was announced. It was developed by Rapture Technologies. The one-shot manga C'mon Digimon, designed by Tenya Yabuno, was published in the Japanese magazine V-Jump by Shueisha in 1997.

A second generation of virtual pets was marketed six months after the launch of the first, followed by a third in 1998. Each player starts with a baby-level digital creature that has a limited number of attacks and transformations and to make the creature stronger by training and nourishing the creature; when the player is successful in a workout, the Digimon becomes strong, when the player fails, the Digimon becomes weak. Two devices can be connected, allowing two players to battle with their respective creatures, an innovation at the time, however, the battle is only possible from the moment the creature is in the child level or bigger. Playgrounds and subways were where the majority of users of the apparatus were concentrated; the virtual pet was banned in some Asian schools, being considered by parents and teachers as very noisy and violent. The first Digimon were created by Japanese designer Kenji Watanabe, influenced by American comics, which were beginning to gain popularity in Japan, and as such began to make his characters look stronger and "cool." Other types of Digimon, which until the year 2000 totalled 279, came from extensive discussions and collaborations between the Bandai company members.

The original Digital Monster model that was released in 1997 sold 14 million units worldwide, including 13 million units in Japan and 1 million overseas, up until March 2004. By 2005, more than 24 million Digital Monster units had been sold worldwide.

== Premise ==
Several media in the franchise are contained within their own continuity; however, they all share a similar setting and premise. For instance, most Digimon stories begin with a human child, who comes into contact with a Digimon. This generally occurs either through an accidental entrance into the so-called "Digital World" or an encounter with a Digimon who has come into the human world. The child or children then often find themselves equipped with a "digivice", which is a device modelled after the series' virtual pets; this device enables them to empower their partner Digimon by tapping into the strong bond between a human and their Digimon for power.

While some Digimon act like wild beasts, there are many who form small societies and follow governing bodies. Digimon can change through evolution (or "digivolution" in most English-language dubs), where they absorb additional data that allows them to change forms, with each Digimon's evolutionary levels going from its "Baby I", "Baby II", "Child", "Adult", "Perfect" and "Ultimate" ("Fresh", "In-Training", "Rookie", "Champion", "Ultimate" and "Mega" in most English-language dubs) stages. This process is normally linear, but there are other methods, depending upon the media within the franchise. For example, "Jogress" (a portmanteau of "joint progress"; "DNA Digivolution" in most English-language dubs) is when two or more Digimon combine into a single being. Though evolution can occur naturally, Digimon can progress into stronger forms more quickly, when they are partnered with a human.

== Media ==
=== Anime ===
==== Television series ====
Multiple Digimon anime series have been produced by Toei Animation since 1999. The first of these was Digimon Adventure; it began as a short film, but after its storyboard was finished, a request for the film to become a television series was made. The film debuted in theaters a day before the series debuted on TV.

There are seven Digimon series adapted into English for release in Western markets, with the first four treated as a single show under the collective title Digimon: Digital Monsters. The sixth series, Digimon Fusion, was only partially dubbed; its third season was never dubbed into English.

| No. | Title | Episodes | Originally aired | | Network |
| No. | Title | Episodes | First aired | Last aired | Network |
|---|---|---|---|---|---|
| 1 | Digimon Adventure (1999) | 54 | March 7, 1999 | March 26, 2000 | Fuji TV |
| 2 | Digimon Adventure 02 | 50 | April 2, 2000 | March 25, 2001 | Fuji TV |
| 3 | Digimon Tamers | 51 | April 1, 2001 | March 31, 2002 | Fuji TV |
| 4 | Digimon Frontier | 50 | April 7, 2002 | March 30, 2003 | Fuji TV |
| 5 | Digimon Data Squad | 48 | April 2, 2006 | March 25, 2007 | Fuji TV |
| 6 | Digimon Fusion | 79 | July 6, 2010 | March 25, 2012 | TV Asahi |
| 7 | Digimon Universe: App Monsters | 52 | October 1, 2016 | September 30, 2017 | TV Tokyo |
| 8 | Digimon Adventure (2020) | 67 | April 5, 2020 | September 26, 2021 | Fuji TV |
| 9 | Digimon Ghost Game | 67+1 special | October 3, 2021 | March 26, 2023 | Fuji TV |
| 10 | Digimon Beatbreak | 49 | October 5, 2025 | September 27, 2026 | Fuji TV |
| 11 | Untitled series | N/A | TBA 2027 | N/A | TBA |
| Total | | 568 episodes | | | |

==== Films ====
Several Digimon films were released in Japan, with some of them seasonal tie-ins for their respective television series. Footage from the first three films was used for the American-produced Digimon: The Movie.

| Title | Originally released |
|---|---|
| Digimon Adventure | March 6, 1999 |
| Digimon Adventure: Our War Game! | March 4, 2000 |
| Digimon Adventure 02: Hurricane Touchdown!! | July 8, 2000 |
| Digimon Adventure 3D: Digimon Grand Prix! | July 20, 2000 |
| Digimon: The Movie | October 6, 2000 |
| Digimon Adventure 02: Revenge of Diaboromon | March 3, 2001 |
| Digimon Tamers: Battle of Adventurers | July 14, 2001 |
| Digimon Tamers: Runaway Locomon | March 2, 2002 |
| Digimon Frontier: Island of Lost Digimon | July 20, 2002 |
| Digital Monster X-Evolution | January 3, 2005 |
| Digimon Savers 3D: The Digital World in Imminent Danger! | July 8, 2006 |
| Digimon Savers: Ultimate Power! Activate Burst Mode!! | December 9, 2006 |
| Digimon Adventure tri. Chapter 1: Reunion | November 21, 2015 |
| Digimon Adventure tri. Chapter 2: Determination | March 12, 2016 |
| Digimon Adventure tri. Chapter 3: Confession | September 24, 2016 |
| Digimon Adventure tri. Chapter 4: Loss | February 25, 2017 |
| Digimon Adventure tri. Chapter 5: Coexistence | September 30, 2017 |
| Digimon Adventure tri. Chapter 6: Future | May 5, 2018 |
| Digimon Adventure: Last Evolution Kizuna | February 21, 2020 |
| Digimon Adventure 02: The Beginning | October 5, 2023 |

==== OVA ====
| No. | Title | Episodes | First aired | Last aired | | | | |
|---|---|---|---|---|---|---|---|---|
| No. | Title | Episodes | | 1 | Digimon Adventure 20th Memorial Story | 5 | November 22, 2019 | December 25, 2020 |
| 2 | Digimon Adventure -BEYOND- | 1 | March 20, 2025 | March 20, 2025 | | | | |

==== Broadcast, distribution and localization ====
===== International =====
In the United States, the first three series/seasons that made up Digimon: Digital Monsters first aired on Fox Kids from August 14, 1999, to June 8, 2002. The localized series was produced by Saban Entertainment, which was acquired by The Walt Disney Company during the show's Fox Kids run. Some scenes from the original shows were modified or omitted in order to comply with Fox's standards and practices. The show also featured more jokes and added dialogue, along with a completely different musical score. As a cross-promotional stunt, 2001 and 2002 saw Digi-Bowl specials co-produced with Fox Sports; NFL on Fox commentator Terry Bradshaw provided interstitial segments in-between episodes as if the episodes were actually a football game.

Disney's acquisition of Saban resulted in Digimon airing on Disney's TV networks and programming blocks. Reruns of the show began airing on the cable network ABC Family on March 4, 2002, while the fourth series/season, Digimon Frontier (which serves as the final season of Digimon: Digital Monsters), premiered on the Disney's Animation Weekdays block on UPN, and the ABC Kids block on ABC. UPN aired the series until late August 2003, when they severed their ties to Disney. Frontier also aired in reruns on ABC Family and Toon Disney under the Jetix branding. An English version of Digimon Data Squad, produced and dubbed by Studiopolis, premiered October 1, 2007, on Toon Disney. Around this time, the remaining Digimon Adventure 02 movie, both Tamers movies and the Frontier movie were dubbed and aired on Toon Disney in the US, with most actors from the TV series reprising their roles. The Data Squad/Savers movie however have not had a North American localised English dub produced.

In September 2012, Saban Brands, a successor to Saban Entertainment, announced it had re-acquired the Digimon anime franchise. Saban announced an English dub for Digimon Xros Wars, retitled Digimon Fusion, for broadcast on Nickelodeon and Nicktoons in the United States starting September 7, 2013. Saban Capital Group sold most of Saban Brands' entertainment properties to Hasbro in 2018 and shutter the division in July of that year.

The Digimon Adventure tri. series were distributed in North America by Eleven Arts, while Saban was not involved with licensing of the film series. The English dub utilized localized names from Saban's original dub, reunite several voice actors from the original cast, and feature a remixed version of the English opening theme, while retaining the original Japanese score. Shout! Factory acquired the broadcast and home media distribution rights for the films.

===== Digimon: World's Best Picks =====
A rebroadcast program for the first four entries in the series, Digimon: World's Best Picks (Japanese: デジモン僕らが選んだベストアドベンチャー, Hepburn: Dejimon Bokura Ga Eranda Besuto Adobenchā) was announced on August 1, 2026. The rebroadcast program features fan-selected episodes from four Digimon series entries but aside from that, new opening and ending theme animations will be created. The series premiered on Fuji Television on October 3, 2026. The opening theme is titled, SHAKARARIKI!! and the ending theme is titled Limitless Dreams, both performed by Ayumi Miyazaki and Takayoshi Tanimoto

==== International ====
In Canada, the English versions of Digimon were broadcast on YTV, with the exception of Data Squad, which aired in Family Channel's Jetix block. YTV acquired Digimon Fusion, but only the first 26 episodes were shown.

In the United Kingdom, Digimon first aired on Fox Kids. ITV's children's slot CITV broadcast Adventure, Adventure 02 and several episodes of Tamers during after school hours from 2001–2002. The rest of Tamers aired on Fox Kids from 2002–03. Digimon Frontier was originally announced to be broadcast on Jetix, but the series was later dropped. The series eventually saw a release on October 29, 2018. In 2011, Digimon Data Squad aired on Kix!. According to Fox Kids' (2000–03) and Kix's (2010–) BARB Television ratings, Adventure, Adventure 02 and Tamers have been the most popular series'/seasons in the United Kingdom and was consistently in the weekly top 10 broadcasts for both channels for new episodes. Broadcast rights and merchandising sub-licensing rights for Digimon Fusion in the UK have been acquired by ITV Studios Global Entertainment. Digimon Fusion had aired since Spring 2014 on digital terrestrial channel, CITV.

In the Philippines, Digimon was first aired on ABS-CBN in Filipino English language from June 2, 2000, to October 21, 2001. And later, it was shift to Filipino on April 6, 2002.

=== Comics ===
Digimon first appeared in narrative form in the one-shot manga C'mon Digimon, released in the summer of 1997. C'mon Digimon spawned the popular Digimon Adventure V-Tamer 01 manga, written by Hiroshi Izawa, which began serialization on November 21, 1998.

==== Digimon Next ====
Written by Tatsuya Hamazaki and illustrated by Takeshi Okano, Digimon Next (デジモンネクスト, Dejimon Nekusuto) was serialized in Shueisha's magazine V Jump from 2005 to 2008. Shueisha collected its chapters in four tankōbon volumes, released from July 4, 2006, to February 4, 2008. The story follow Tsurugi Tatsuno and his digimon partner, Greymon (later Agumon). Tsurugi makes contact with the Digital World through his virtual pet device called Digimon Mini and a "Battle Terminal", a virtual reality interface. Digimon can use the technology to materialize in the human world as well.

==== Digimon Dreamers ====
In 2021, a manga called Digimon Dreamers was announced.

==== Yuen Wong Yu manhua ====
A Chinese manhua was written and drawn by Yuen Wong Yu, who based its storyline on the television series. This adaptation covers Digimon Adventure in five volumes, Digimon Adventure 02 in two, Digimon Tamers in four, and Digimon Frontier in three. The original stories are heavily abridged, though on rare occasions events play out differently from the anime. The Chinese-language version was published by Rightman Publishing Ltd. in Hong Kong. Yu also wrote D-Cyber.

Two English versions were also released. The first one was published by Chuang Yi in Singapore. The second one, which was adapted by Lianne Sentar, was released by Tokyopop in North America.
The three volumes for Digimon Frontier have been released by Chuang Yi in English. These have not been released by TOKYOPOP in North America or Europe. However, the Chuang Yi releases of Digimon Frontier were distributed by Madman Entertainment in Australia.

==== Dark Horse ====
Dark Horse Comics published American-style Digimon comic books, adapting the first thirteen episodes of the English dub of Digimon Adventure in 2001. The story was written by Daniel Horn and Ryan Hill, and illustrated by Daniel Horn and Cara L. Niece.

==== Panini ====
The Italian publishing company Panini published Digimon titles in several ways in different countries. Germany had their own adaptations of episodes, the UK reprinted the Dark Horse titles and translated some of the German adaptations of Adventure 02 episodes. Eventually the UK comics had their own original stories, which appeared in both the UK's Digimon Magazine and the UK Fox Kids companion magazine Wickid. These original stories roughly followed the continuity of Adventure 02. When the comic switched to the Tamers series the storylines adhered to continuity more strictly; sometimes it expanded on subject matter not covered by the original Japanese anime (such as Mitsuo Yamaki's past) or the English adaptations of the television shows and movies (such as Ryo's story or the movies that remained undubbed until 2005). In a money saving venture, the original stories were later removed from Digimon Magazine, which returned to printing translated German adaptations of Tamers episodes. Eventually, both magazines were cancelled.

=== Video games ===
The Digimon series has inspired various video games, including the Digimon World and Digimon Story sub-series of role-playing video games. Other genres have included life simulation, adventure, video card game, strategy, and racing games.

By March 2001, Bandai had sold approximately 1 million video games worldwide, including 400,000 in Japan. In February 2010, a website for the MMORPG Digimon Battle Online was launched. On September 22, 2011, online game publisher Joymax announced the release of an MMORPG game called Digimon Masters, which was developed by the Korean publisher DIGITALIC. In June 2021 it was announced that they were developing a new MMORPG titled Digimon Super Rumble.

In 2011, a new entry in the Digimon World series was announced after a seven-year hiatus, titled Digimon World Re:Digitize. The game was released in Japan on July 19, 2012, followed by an enhanced version for Nintendo 3DS released in 2013.

Digimon Story: Cyber Sleuth was first released in Japan in 2015. It is the first game in the Digimon Story series to be released in North America under its original title; Digimon World DS and Digimon World Dawn and Dusk were originally marketed as entries in the Digimon World series, with the latter game being the last to be released in the West for nine years until Cyber Sleuth's release on February 2, 2016.

There have been several mobile games. Digimon Links was active from March 2016 to July 2019, and was similar to the Story games in that the player raised digimon in a farm and fought enemies using a team of three of their Digimon. It was succeeded by Digimon ReArise, which launched June 2018 in Japan and October 2019 in America.

=== Web novel ===
In February 2023, Bandai announced a web novel titled Digimon Seekers (デジモンシーカーズ, Dejimon Shīkāzu) to celebrate the 25th anniversary of the franchise. The novel serialized on the Digimon Web website for about a year, starting on April 3, simultaneously in English, Chinese, and Japanese.

=== Webcomic ===
In December 2023, Bandai announced a webcomic titled Digimon Liberator for Spring 2024.

=== Card game ===
The Digimon Collectible Card Game was a card game based on Digimon, first introduced in Japan in 1997 and published by Bandai. The third season (Digimon Tamers) utilized this aspect of the franchise by making the card game an integral part of the season. Versions of the card game are also included in some of the Digimon video games including Digital Card Battle and Digimon World 3.

During the fourth anime (Digimon Frontier), Bandai created the D-Tector Card Game to tie in to their own D-Tector virtual pet toys. This was a West-only card game. From February 25, 2011, to September 28, 2012, Digimon Jintrix was an online card game supported by physical card releases. It was followed up by the mobile game Digimon Crusader, which lasted from December 2012 to December 2017.

In April 2020, the Digimon Card Game was released in Japan by Bandai Card Games to coincide with Digimon Adventure. It was released worldwide in January 2021.

Some examples of the different versions of the Digimon CCG.

== Legacy ==
Although Digimon is oftentimes compared to Pokémon and is perceived as living in the latter's shadow, the franchise has garnered a large fanbase, made up of mostly millennials who grew up with the original anime. Angemon's debut is considered one of the most iconic moments in anime history.

MetalGreymon in Digimon World has been closely associated with the original PlayStation as it was the first Digimon video game ever released, before becoming popularized with his anime appearance. The Digimon Story series particularly from the Playstation 4 onwards has triggered a resurgence in the franchise's video game releases. Cyber Sleuth sold better than Bandai Namco's own expectations and Time Stranger generated record profits.

New York City's mayor Zohran Mamdani considers Digimon his favorite anime franchise.
