= Digimon World DS =

2006 video game

- North American version cover art
- Developer: BEC
- Publisher: Bandai Namco Games (Note: Published under the Bandai brand in Japan.)
- Director: Akiyoshi Kanbe
- Producers: Ryo Mito; Masahiro Knittel; Yoshinobu Matsuo
- Writer: Shinya Murakami
- Composer: Koji Yamada
- Series: Digimon
- Platform: Nintendo DS
- Release: JP: June 15, 2006; NA: November 8, 2006
- Genre: Role-playing video game
- Modes: Single Player; Nintendo Wi-Fi Connection

Digimon World DS, known in Japan as Digimon Story (デジモンストーリー, Dejimon Sutōrī), is a role-playing video game for the Nintendo DS developed by BEC and published by Bandai Namco Games. The game was released in Japan on June 15, 2006, and in North America later that year on November 8. Despite its localized title, the game shares no relation to the separate Digimon World series.

The Digimon Story series has spawned several sequels; including Digimon World Dawn and Dusk, Digimon Story Lost Evolution, Digimon Story: Super Xros Wars Red and Blue, Digimon Story: Cyber Sleuth, Digimon Story: Cyber Sleuth – Hacker's Memory, and Digimon Story: Time Stranger.

== Gameplay ==
The player selects an attack from the menu to battle an enemy Digimon.

In the game, the player controls a Digimon tamer and embarks on a journey to discover, tame, raise, train various Digimon. The player can build Digi-Farms to raise, evolve and communicate with the Digimon. Using Wi-Fi and local DS wireless connection, players can interact by exchanging Digimon, engaging in battles, and pooling resources to create rare types of Digimon.

== Plot ==
The game's plot features characters and settings loosely based on the Digimon Data Squad anime series (known as Digimon Savers in Japan). The story sees the player character transported to the Digital World, where he or she raises and befriends Digimon and fights an evil entity calling himself "Unknown-D".

== Reception ==
Reception

Aggregate score
Aggregator	Score
Metacritic	71/100

Review scores
Publication	Score
Famitsu	30/40
GameSpot	7.2/10
GameSpy	3.5/5
GameZone	7.4/10
IGN	7.5/10
Nintendo World Report	6.5/10
RPGFan	61%

Famitsu gave the game a relatively positive score of 30/40, receiving cross review scores of 8, 7, 8, and 7, respectively, as well as earning a "must buy" recommendation for the month. It also appeared in Famitsu's list of 100 best selling Nintendo DS games in their December 2006 issue, ranking in at number 33, with 213,770 units sold.

Elsewhere, the game received "mixed or average reviews" according to the review aggregation website Metacritic.

IGN reviewer Jack DeVries claimed that "...despite its derivative nature and somewhat mediocre elements, it's still a lot of fun..." and recommended the game "...for players that are dying to get their monster battling RPG fix", also meriting it for its humorous scriptwriting and unique method of collecting Digimon. GamePro said, "Old Digimon fans will absolutely love this game; it's a repackaging of the older Digimons [sic], but with much more to do." (Note: GamePro gave the game 4/5 for graphics, 3.5/5 for sound, and two 3.75/5 scores for control and fun factor.)
