= List of Shadow Star chapters =

The chapters of the Japanese manga series Shadow Star, known in Japan as Narutaru (Japanese: なるたる), are written and illustrated by Mohiro Kitoh. It was originally serialized in Kodansha's seinen manga magazine Monthly Afternoon from March 1998 to October 2003. In the United States, it was licensed by Dark Horse Comics and serialized in English on their Super Manga Blast! manga magazine.

There are twelve tankōbon volumes total in the Japanese release, and seven in the English-language release. As a result of Dark Horse's rearrangement of the series' chapters, those seven volumes actually cover volumes 1 to 6 of the original Japanese release. Further chapters were serialized in Super Manga Blast!, and starting with the magazine's 54th issue, the series was translated in its original right-to-left reading format; this lasted until Super Manga Blast! was cancelled five issues later. These chapters have not been collected into volumes yet, and Dark Horse has not announced any plans to further translate Shadow Star.

== Japanese volume list ==
No.	Japanese release date	Japanese ISBN
1	August 21, 1998	978-4-06-314186-3
"Prologue" (プロローグ, Purorōgu); 1. "In the Shape of a Star" (それは星のカタチ, Sore wa Hoshi no Katachi); 2. "Princess of the Empty Sky" (虚空の姫, Kokū no Hime); 3. "The Razor's Edge" (カミソリの向かうところ, Kamisori no Mukau Tokoro); 4. "Blinded by the Light" (災いは光の内, Wazawai wa Hikari no Uchi); 5. "Darkness Visible" (黒の1号, Kuro no Ichi Gō); "Opening Up the Dressing Room –Design Study–" (楽屋ご開帳-design study-, Gakuya Go Kaichō Dezain Sutadi)
2	January 22, 1999	978-4-06-314197-9
6. "Knife-Edge" (ナイフの向かうところ, Naifu no Mukau Tokoro); 7. "Blood Sacrifice" (柱に血を捧げて, Hashira ni Chi o Sasagete); 8. "Night of Evil Dreams" (夢魔の夜, Muma no Yoru); 9. "The Star Chamber Club" (鳩首その1・黒の子供会, Kyūshu Sono Ichi – Kuro no Kodomo Kai); 10. "Star Chamber II: The Special Research Council on Military Balloons" (鳩首その2・臨時軍用気球研究会議, Kyūshu Sono Ni – Rinji Gun'yō Kikyū Kenkyū Kaigi); 11. "The Last Days of Summer" (残暑, Zansho); 12. "Misery: 1/365th" (1/365の憂鬱, Sanbyaku Roku Jū Go Bun no Ichi no Yūutsu); 13. "Games Angels Play" (天使のお遊戯, Tenshi no O Yūgi)
3	July 22, 1999	978-4-06-314217-4
14. "Shadows of the Past" (影は少年の歩幅で, Kage wa Shōnen no Hohaba de); 15. "The Weight of a Scream" (叫びの重さ, Sakebi no Omosa); 16. "The Residents of Chaos" (混沌の住人, Konton no Jūnin); 17. "Regarding Komori Tomonori and His Family" (小森朋典とその家庭について, Komori Tomonori to Sono Katei ni Tsuite); 18. "Nothing but the Truth" (彼の言葉は真実, Kare no Kotoba wa Shinjitsu); 19. "On the Road" (宮子、疾走, Miyako, Shissō); 20. "Her First Errand" (はじめてのおつかい, Hajimete no Otsukai)
4	January 21, 2000	978-4-06-314229-7
21. "A Flower's Fragrance..." (戦う者に華の芳を そして死ぬ者に, Tatakau Mono ni Hana no Kaori o Soshite Shinu Mono ni); 22. "Coup Incomplete" (クーデター完遂せず, Kū Detā Kansui Sezu); 23. "Toward Homo Demens" (ホモ・デメンスに向けて, Homo-Demensu ni Mukete)
5	May 24, 2000	978-4-06-314242-6
24. "A Footless Doll" (足首のないお人形, Ashikubi no Nai Oningyō); 25. "Redemption for the Forgotten" (忘れ物の贖い, Wasuremono no Aganai); 26. "A Cold Entrance" (冷たい玄関, Tsumetai Genkan); 27. "Fish Life, Human Life" (魚の命、人の命, Sakana no Inochi, Hito no Inochi); 28. "What Can I Do for You Now?" (今、あなたのためにできること, Ima, Anata no Tame ni Dekiru Koto)
6	November 22, 2000	978-4-06-314254-9
29. "My Eyes Are the Eyes of a Victim; My Hands Are the Hands of an Assailant" (わたしの目は被害者の目 わたしの手は加害者の手, Watashi no Me wa Higaisha no Me Watashi no Te wa Kagaisha no Te)
7	June 22, 2001	978-4-06-314266-2
30. "The Heart That Wraps the Flowers" (花を包む その心に, Hana o Tsutsumu Sono Kokoro ni); 31. "... And, Lies." (そして、虚言, Soshite, Kyogen); 32. "Norio Koga's Bedroom" (古賀のり夫の閨, Koga Norio no Neya); 33. "The Value of..." (その価値, Sono Kachi); 34. "Spring" (春, Haru); 35. ""The Warning Was an All-Too-Common Incident..."" (警告はありふれた事件, Keikoku wa Arifureta Jiken); 36. "The Garden of Ostentation" (虚飾の花園, Kyoshoku no Hanazono); 37. "Calm Company" (穏やかな同席者, Odayaka na Dōsekisha); 38. "The Cup Runneth Over" (満ちるコップ, Michiru Koppu)
8	January 23, 2002	978-4-06-314283-9
39. "Grudges" (枯れてゆく遺恨, Kareteyuku Ikon); 40. "Fire God Car" (火神の車, Kakami no Kuruma); 41. "Finite Power" (有限の力, Yūgen no Chikara); 42. "Sheep" (羊, Hitsuji); 43. "Each Others' Reasons" (それぞれの事情, Sorezore no Jijō); 44. "Two Little Runaways" (家出人 二人, Iedenin Futari)
9	July 23, 2002	978-4-06-314301-0
45. "Mother of Russia" (ロシアの母, Roshia no Haha); 46. "Child of Japan" (日本の子供, Nihon no Kodomo); 47. "Dream of Falling" (落ちる夢, Ochiru Yume); 48. "Black and White" (黒白, Kokubyaku)
10	February 21, 2003	978-4-06-314315-7
49. "The Beginning of the Weekend" (週末の始まり, Shūmatsu no Hajimari); 50. "Decaying Light" (蝕む光, Mushibamu Hikari)
11	July 23, 2003	978-4-06-314321-8
51. "Returning Home in a Bag" (袋の中の帰宅, Fukuro no Naka no Kitaku); 52. "My Body is One Island" (わたしのからだはひとつのしま, Watashi no Karada wa Hitotsu no Shima); 53. "Summer Sleep Under the Earth" (地下に眠る夏, Chika ni Nemuru Natsu); 54. "Conscience Bites" (呵責, Kashaku); 55. "People Searching, People Searched For" (捜す人、捜される人, Sagasu Hito, Sagasareru Hito); 56. "Where Humans Return to" (人の還る場所, Hito no Kaeru Basho); 57. "And One Day" (そしてくる日, Soshite Kuru Hi); 58. "Before the Long and Short Journey Together" (二人の長い旅の前の 二人の短い旅の前の, Futari no Nagai Tabi no Mae no Futari no Mijikai Tabi no Mae no); 59. "The Child Fascinated by the Star" (星に魅入られた子, Hoshi ni Miirareta Ko); 60. "Things that Soar" (飛翔するモノ達, Hishō Suru Mono Tachi); 61. "Together We Fly" (二人で飛ぶ, Futari de Tobu)
12	December 22, 2003	978-4-06-314335-5
62. "Summer's Winter" (夏の冬, Natsu no Fuyu); 63. "Thirteen Years Since You Died" (13年間の死, Jū San Nen Kan no Shi); 64. "Father" (父, Chichi); 65. "The Gentle Voice That Calls to Me" (あのやさしい私をよぶ声, Ano Yasashii Watashi o Yobu Koe); 66. "The Work of Art is Complete" (能事終われり, Nōji Owareri); 67. "The Frozen Planet and the Chosen Child" (骸なる星 珠たる子, Mukuro Naru Hoshi Tama Taru Ko)

== English-language volume list ==
No.	Title	English release date	English ISBN
1	Starflight	September 5, 2001	978-1-56971-548-2
"Prologue"; "In the Shape of a Star"; "Princess of the Empty Sky"; "The Razor's Edge"; "Blinded by the Light"
2	Darkness Visible	April 17, 2002	978-1-56971-740-0
"Darkness Visible"; "Knife-Edge"; "Blood Sacrifice"; "Night of Evil Dreams"; "The Star Chamber Club"; "Star Chamber II: The Special Research Council on Military Balloons"
3	Shadows of the Past	October 9, 2002	978-1-56971-743-1
"The Last Days of Summer"; "Misery: 1/365th"; "Games Angels Play"; "Shadows of the Past"; "The Weight of a Scream"
4	Nothing but the Truth	April 9, 2003	978-1-56971-920-6
"The Residents of Chaos"; "Regarding Komori Tomonori and His Family"; "Nothing but the Truth"; "On the Road"; "Her First Errand"
5	A Flower's Fragrance	March 10, 2004	978-1-56971-990-9
"A Flower's Fragrance..."; "Coup Incomplete"; "Toward Homo Demens"
6	What Can I Do for You Now?	January 26, 2005	978-1-59307-212-4
"A Footless Doll"; "Redemption for the Forgotten"; "A Cold Entrance"; "Fish Life, Human Life"; "What Can I Do for You Now?"
7	Victim's Eyes, Assailant's Hands	December 21, 2005	978-1-59307-363-3
"My Eyes Are the Eyes of a Victim; My Hands Are the Hands of an Assailant"

=== Chapters not yet in volume format ===
These chapters have yet to be collected into volumes. They were serialized in issues of Super Manga Blast! from September 2004 to February 2006.

- "The Heart That Wraps the Flowers" / "... And, Lies."
- "Norio Koga's Bedroom" / "The Value of..."
- "Spring"
- ""The Warning Was an All-Too-Common Incident..."" / "The Garden of Ostentation"
- "Calm Company"
- "The Cup Runneth Over"
- "The Cup Runneth Over, Part Two"
- "Grudges, Part One"
- "Grudges, Part Two"
- "Grudges, Part Three"
- "Grudges Part 4"
- "Finite Power" / "Sheep"
- "Each Others' Reasons" / "Two Little Runaways"
- "Mother of Russia, Part 1"
- "Mother of Russia, Part 2"
