= List of Devil Survivor 2: The Animation episodes =

Devil Survivor 2: The Animation
- Season 2
- Cover of the Complete Collection DVD volume released by Sentai Filmworks in North America on July 1, 2014 featuring Hibiki Kuze
- Native name
- Kanji: デビルサバイバー2 ジ・アニメーション
- Revised Hepburn: Debiru Sabaibā Tsū Ji Animēshon
- No. of episodes: 13

Release
- Original network: MBS
- Original release: April 4 – June 27, 2013

Devil Survivor 2: The Animation is a 2013 supernatural anime series based on the Shin Megami Tensei: Devil Survivor 2 video game by Atlus. The story revolves around a mysterious calamity which plunges the world into a state of chaos. This causes Hibiki Kuze and his friends Daichi Shijima and Io Nitta to be suddenly thrown from their normal lives into a battle of survival against creatures called Septentriones which were sent by the alien entity known as Polaris to destroy the spiritual barriers protecting Japan from a recreation tool known as The Void. Gaining the ability to summon demons from a cell phone app, Hibiki and his friends team up with an organization known as the JP's to protect Japan and above all else—survive.

The anime adaptation is produced by Studio Bridge of Japan and directed by Seiji Kishi. In addition, series composition and script writing for all episodes were done by Makoto Uezu while the musical score was composed by Kotaro Nakagawa. Character designs are done by Etsushi Sajima, which are based on the original character designs by Suzuhito Yasuda, along with art direction by Kazuto Shimoyama and sound direction by Satoki Iida. The thirteen episode series premiered on MBS' Animeism programming block on April 4, 2013, and was later aired on TBS, CBC, BS-TBS and Niconico. The series was first acquired by Crunchyroll for online simulcast streaming in North America and other select locations across the world. It was later obtained by the Anime Network for streaming. Pony Canyon released the series on seven Blu-ray and DVD volumes between June 19 and December 18, 2013 in Japan. The anime was licensed by Sentai Filmworks in North America for home media distribution. Hanabee Entertainment later licensed the series for release in Australia and New Zealand. MVM Entertainment also obtained the series for distribution in the United Kingdom.

The episodes use three pieces of theme music: one opening theme, one closing themes and one insert song. The anime debuted with "Take Your Way" by Livetune feat. Fukase as the opening theme for all episodes except the ninth and tenth episodes. The first closing theme, "Be" by Song Riders is used for all episodes except the tenth. The insert song is "Each and All" by Livetune feat. Rin Oikawa and doubled as the closing theme for the tenth episode.

== Episode list ==
No.	Title (Note: All English titles are taken from Sentai Filmworks.)	Directed by	Original release date (Note: As Devil Survivor 2: The Animation premiered in MBS' Thursday 26:05 (02:05 JST) time slot, the episodes technically aired the days following the ones listed.)	Ref.
1	"Melancholy Sunday"; Transliteration: "1st Day Yūutsu no Nichiyōbi" (Japanese: 1ST DAY 憂鬱の日曜日)	Yoshimichi Hirai	April 4, 2013	
Hibiki Kuze meets up with his friend, Daichi Shijima after finishing their practice exams. While discussing their future, Daichi introduces and registers them onto a recently popular website called "Nicaea", a video delivery site that allows people to see videos of their friend's death. Later, at the train station, they receive videos from Nicaea that show both of their deaths by an oncoming train at that exact station. Shortly after, before the train arrives, an earthquake occurs, causing the incoming train to derail and cause the same devastation they saw in the videos. On the verge of death, Nicaea offers Hibiki a second chance to live and a Demon Summoning App is forcefully downloaded into his phone. He and Daichi awake to find the station in ruins with most of the people dead. They then witness vile wolf-like creatures eating the corpses of the recently deceased. As the creatures turn their sights on them, rescued classmate Io Nitta and Daichi inadvertently manifest demons from their cell phones which repel the attacking creatures and allow them to escape. Making it back to the surface, they find that all of Japan has met with the same type of calamity before a strange organization takes over rescue operations, with the officer in charge pondering that humankind must survive "Judgement Day" even if it means using demons. With nowhere to go, the three decide to stick together and while waiting in Roppongi, the crowd is attacked by a demon called Dubhe. At the same time Hibiki receives another video showing Daichi's death, before Daichi bursts out of a corner with a delivery truck, intending to ram the demon. As the truck explodes, Hikibi, overcome with emotion, manifests his Avatar: Byakko, a tiger like demon which he manipulates and successfully destroys the Dubhe. In the aftermath, Daichi had been saved by another one of Io's demons, a pixie-like creature before the group is approached by the Japan Meteorological Agency: JP's. Elsewhere, a mysterious man watches the entire event and refers to Hibiki as "The Shining One."
2	"Monday of Upheaval I"; Transliteration: "2nd Day Gekidō no Getsuyōbi I" (Japanese: 2ND DAY 激動の月曜日I)	Kazunobu Shimizu	April 11, 2013	
Hibiki, Daichi and Io are arrested by the JP's and brought to a secret underground base located at the National Diet Building. Here, Commander Makoto Sako explains to Hibiki that the JP's protects Japan from "paranormal anomalies" before she introduces the JP's Chief, Yamato Hotsuin who says that Hibiki's demon, the avatar Byakko is unique, being one of the four symbols of the Chinese constellations. Furthermore, he explains that the Dubhe was only one of 7 creatures called the Septentriones, each of which will appear in the next six days and should the JP's fail to defeat them then the world will disappear. As the JP's scientists begin to analyze the demon summoning app, Hibiki ponders on Yamato's words. The following day, Makoto releases them by taking them to an emergency shelter in Chūō. Here, it is discovered that a rumor of demons running amok is spreading. As Hikibi looks around at all of the refugees in a church, a winged-demon attacks and Hibiki summons Byakko to protect them. As Hibiki fights an endless swarm of the demons, Makoto shows up with her demon, Power and helps Hibiki defeat the winged-demons by destroying the rogue cellphone which had been summoning them. In the aftermath Hibiki walks away when he realizes the refugees are afraid of him, but gains resolve, along with Daichi and Io to help the JP's after a child thanks him for protecting them. Back at the Diet Building, Yamato outlines Hibiki, Daichi and Io's first mission: to locate and rescue missing JP's scientist Dr. Fumi Kanno. In the epilogue, Yamato has a short dialogue with the "Anguished One" about Hibiki, while elsewhere, somewhere in Nagoya a man remarks that their "plan" shall be set in motion.
3	"Monday of Upheaval II"; Transliteration: "2nd Day Gekidō no Getsuyōbi II" (Japanese: 2ND DAY 激動の月曜日II)	Shin'ichi Masaki	April 18, 2013	
Under Yamato's order, Hibiki, Daichi and Io arrive at Osaka to help locate chief JP's scientist, Dr. Fumi Kanno, who had recently vanished. Upon their arrival they are greeted by other JP's summoners, Hinako Kujou and Keita Wakui, the latter of whom is less than welcoming and returns to his mission of hunting down rogue demons. Unable to find any leads, Hibiki and co. head to the JP's Osaka headquarters, where its data center comes under the attack of an external hacker who reroutes its identity to multiple locations across Japan. At the same time, Hinako receives Keita's death clip which appears to be located nearby at the abandoned Festivalgate theme park, which Hibiki deduces is the source of the hack since it is the only location which shows up upon an isolated scan of the Osaka area. As Yamato instructs Hibiki and co. to head to the theme park, Hibiki asks an operator to inform Keita not to head there in order to prevent his death. Although, unbeknownst to them Keita is already at the theme park and is ambushed by the demons Gozuki and Mezuki. Keita summons his demon Berserker and puts up a valiant effort, but is soon overwhelmed as the demons keep re-spawning. He is soon thrown off balance but is saved by Hinako's demon Lilim, which seems to avert his death, followed by Hibiki, Daichi and Io. Yamato orders Makato to use a defense program created by Dr. Kanno called "Almadel" which manages to slow the hacker's demons down. After Hibiki quickly issues tasks to everyone, Hinako discovers that the hacker is in fact a brainwashed Dr. Fumi Kanno, who is being manipulated by the demon Botis. Hibiki and Keita use Byakko and Berserker respectively to launch a feint attack and takes out Botis just as Daichi damages the router to stop the hack. However, Botis reappears behind Dr. Kanno and launches a lightning attack on the group. In a split second reaction, Keita manages to push Hibiki out of the way but the blast ends up killing him, fulfilling his death clip, much to Hibiki's shock. As the theme park begins crumbling, Botis has Dr. Kanno remotely access the "Almadel" program within the JP's mainframe which finishes destroying the JP's firewall, as well as their spiritual barriers and leaves them completely vulnerable to attack. Finally, the Septentrione: Merak appears in Osaka.
4	"Monday of Upheaval III"; Transliteration: "2nd Day Gekidō no Getsuyōbi III" (Japanese: 2ND DAY 激動の月曜日III)	Fumiharu Kamanaka	April 25, 2013	
Following Keita's sudden death, Hibiki remains visibly shaken due to the fact that they couldn't prevent it. As Merak arrives in the city, Yamato has JP's members move Hibiki into position to intercept it. At the Shin Juso Ohashi Bridge, the Japanese military tries and fails in their attack against Merak while Botis and "The Anguished One" discuss the state of affairs. With of the loss of most of Osaka's spiritual barriers, Merak fully manifests itself and makes its way to the final barrier at the Tsūtenkaku Tower. Meanwhile, as Hibiki is deployed into the field, Hinako and Io discuss his mental state due to Keita's death. Meanwhile at the Umeda Sky Building, JP's summoners try to stop Merak with a swarm of Itsumade but it kills them all in an instant. As Io heads to Hibiki's location, Merak then launches a devastating ice attack, at the "Tsutenkaku" barrier, which survives, but the attack leaves a path of destruction and kills many more people, upsetting Hibiki. Not wanting any more people to die, Hibiki abandons his post and proceeds further up the battleground to confront Merak. Io arrives just as Hibiki departs and prompting Yamato to use her as Hibiki's replacement at the defensive line. Hibiki arrives at the current battleground at Kawaramachi in the Chūō-ku Ward and intervenes in Hinako and a platoon of JP's summoners fight against Merak. Hibiki has Byakko unleash a strong lightning attack at Merak, which doesn't have any effect. Merak counterattacks and Hinako protects Hibiki but gets severely injured which then shatters his fighting resolve. In the wake of the attack, the "Anguished One" approaches Hibiki and introduces himself as Alcor. He informs Hibiki, that because of his "choice" to fight, Io has taken his place at the final defensive line, causing Hibiki to head over there. Io's feelings allow her to summon Kikuri-Hime and proceeds to attack Merak with support from the JP's summoners. Although Kikuri-Hime manages to severely damage Merak, it sheds its outer layer and begins charging up its final attack. Just then Hibiki appears with Byakko and successfully deals the final blow to Merak, defeating it. As Merak slowly begins to disintegrate, Hibiki lets his guard down and Merak tries to move, but is destroyed by the demon, Hagen, as Hibiki is approached by Ronaldo Kuriki. As the JP's reports that their Nagoya Branch has been seized, Ronaldo tells Hibiki that Yamato is dangerous and asks him to accompany him. As Io heads to where Hibiki last attacked Merak, the JP's reports that he has vanished.
5	"Tuesday of Turbulence I"; Transliteration: "3rd Day Fuon no Kaiyōbi I" (Japanese: 3RD DAY 不穏の火曜日I)	Hiroyuki Hashimoto	May 2, 2013	
Makato briefs an infiltration team of JP's agents on their way via train to retake the JP's Nagoya Branch from Ronaldo's control. At the same time, Daichi and Io stow away on the train and ponder why Hibiki left them behind. Just then, they are shocked to receive Hibiki's death clip and resolve to save him themselves. In the meantime, the JP's tries to reassess the situation after losing contact with Hibiki and now their infiltration team as Dr. Kanno repairs the damage to the JP's Osaka servers. Meanwhile in Nagoya, Jungo Torii and Airi Ban plan to infiltrate the JP's Nagoya Branch and retake it from the insurgents, although Airi also speculates that the JP's and the Resistance (Insurgents) had prior knowledge of the calamity. Elsewhere, Daichi and Io arrive in Nagoya to discover a Resistance camp handing out rations to civilians. Just then the camp is attacked by a swarm of rogue Legion demons. Daichi and Io summon their demons to intercept, however the swarm proves to be too large. Hibiki then appears in the background with the demon Suzaku and incinerates the swarm. As Hibiki leaves, Daichi demands from a nearby insurgent about his whereabouts to meet the insurgent leader, Ronaldo. Later at the Nagoya Branch, while an insurgent member and JP's medic, Otome Yanagiya argue over the state of affairs, Ronaldo appears with Hibiki and tells them that once all the Septentriones have been defeated, Yamato intends to create and become the leader of a new Meritocratic governing power in the aftermath. He further states that Yamato manipulated both the JP's and the Japanese Government for that ambition and when he, a former detective and JP's agent found out i.e. the "Hotsuin Family Secret": Yamato's plans and their predictions of the Septentriones, an attempt was made on his life. Still in a doubt, Ronaldo reminds Hibiki of how many lives were lost at Yamato's order during Merak's assault and that a world in Yamato's control would result in death for those without power. Ronaldo concludes that all people should be equal. Meanwhile, Airi and Jungo sneak into the Sakura-dōri Subway Line. Feeling a bit down due by the sudden truth, Yuzuru 'Joe' Akie tries to cheer up Hibiki. Following this Ronaldo takes Hibiki to the JP's Nagoya Command center and briefs him along with Joe and Otome of his plan to intercept the Septentrione predicted to appear in Nagoya and that by defeating it, the Resistance will assert their power. Elsewhere, Yamato ponders on the situation and a flashback shows how he was groomed by his family along with scientists for demon summoning. However, for his first summon, Yamato manifests Cerberus and destroys the lab. In the aftermath he is approached by Alcor who hails him as the "Shining One." Back in the present Alcor once again approaches Yamato and they put a plan into motion. Just then Yamato receives a death clip of his "friend" Hibiki, to his shock.
6	"Tuesday of Turbulence II"; Transliteration: "3rd Day Fuon no Kaiyōbi II" (Japanese: 3RD DAY 不穏の火曜日II)	Satoshi Nakagawa	May 9, 2013	
Airi and Jungo sneak into the JP's Nagoya Branch through the air ducts, while elsewhere, Daichi and Io rush to Hibiki's location in order to prevent his death. Ronado, Hibiki, Joe and Otome scout the Nagoya TV Tower in anticipation of the third Septentrione, although Otome is hesitant to fight, due to the JP's lack of information about the Septentriones. Later, back at the Nagoya Branch, Otome and Hibiki have a brief discussion comparing Yamato's methods versus Ronaldo's methods. At this time, Daichi and Io arrive and tell Hibiki about his death clip while Makoto covers for them at the JP's Headquarters. Daichi and Io try to get Hibiki to return to the JP's but he states that he can't because of the imminent Septentrione attack. Eventually all three decide to stay and protect each other. Meanwhile, Airi and Jungo inadvertently fall through the air ducts and ensue in a battle with the Resistance members. Ronaldo enters the fray and tries to reason with them, although Airi ignores and attacks Ronaldo, even after Hibiki pleads for them to stop. At this time the manifestation readings suddenly increase and the Septentrione: Phecda manifests itself directly in the Command Center to everyone's shock. Ronaldo immediately issues emergency orders and has Airi and Jungo help attack Phecda along with Joe. As the group launches an assault, their demon attacks are not strong enough to damage Phecda, who counterattacks with an electrical attack, wiping out their demons along with the Branch's main power for Nagoya's spiritual barrier. Hibiki, Daichi, Io and Otome arrive and attack with Suzaku, Kikuri-Hime and Sarasvati. Although their attacks seem initially successful, Phecda splits itself into two rings and focuses its attack into a laser which destroys both Suzaku and Kikuri-Hime while cutting through half of the Branch. As Daichi warns that the laser is the same one predicted to kill Hibiki, he summons Byakko just as Phecda targets him, but Sarasvati intercepts the beam which destroys them both. As Hibiki is out of demons, to everyone's horror Phecda targets him once more. Just as the beam charges, Cerberus appears and stops the attack, followed by Yamato, who amplifies Cerberus' power and is able to destroy Phecda. In the wake, the JP's reveals that they used the chaos Phecda created to restore the Nagoya servers and retake control of the base. Yamato then orders Hibiki to return to the JP's but Hibiki can't agree with his methods which result in death. Ronaldo then exposes Yamato's plan for the world in the aftermath of the calamity, shocking everyone, and prompting the Resistance members to surround him. Unfazed, Yamato makes no attempt to deny Ronaldo's words, instead reaffirming everyone's belief that it is fact by stating that his method is the most effective manner to save the world especially since the Septentriones do not discriminate to kill. Hibiki then summons Byakko and states that he will stop Yamato if he intends to intentionally hurt people. At this time, Alcor appears and tells Hibiki that Yamato came to save him after receiving his death clip.
7	"Wednesday of Transformations I"; Transliteration: "4th Day Hen'yō no Suiyōbi I" (Japanese: 4TH DAY 変容の水曜日I)	Takeshi Furuta	May 16, 2013	
As the exchange between Hibiki, Yamato and Alcor continues, Yamato rejects the notion of a person's fate being predetermined by the death-clips. As Hibiki is forced to make a choice of staying with the Resistance or returning to the JP's with Yamato, Ronaldo tries to sway his decision but is stopped by the demon Bifrons. As everyone realizes that Alcor isn't using a cell-phone to control the demon, his origins are questioned by Hibiki to which he responds that he genuinely doesn't know, only that he isn't their enemy. Ronaldo has the Resistance summoners surround him with demons, but Bifrons easily incinerates them. Alcor goes on to calmly reveal that he is the creator of Nicaea and the Demon Summoning App, which he gave to humans as a means to fight the Septentriones, finally remarking that it allowed him to find a new "Shining One" in Hibiki. Ignoring the exchange, Yamato outlines that the next Septentrione will appear simultaneously at the spiritual barriers in Tokyo, Nagoya and Osaka with Fumi adding that only high level demons would be strong enough to face them from now on. As he leaves, Yamato entrusts Osaka to Hibiki and leaves the Resistance in charge of the Septentrione in Nagoya although both Hibiki and Ronaldo state that they will not be Yamato's pawns. Hibiki concludes that at the end of the week long Septentrione battle, he will stop Yamato's plans. Afterwards, Alcor has an exchange with Bifrons and Botis on his actions which hint at stopping the "Purge of Polaris", while simultaneously as Yamato looks at having overused his power to control Ceberus, he recalls having rejected being the "Shining One" in favor of his ideals of stopping the "Purge" to Alcor in the past. The next day, as Fumi finishes work on a teleportation device, all the JP's and Resistance members submit for routine health checkups. Hibiki thanks Daichi for coming to his aid, while Io and Otome talk about the bonds they share with the people close to them, while Otome simultaneously teases Io about her crush on Hibiki. At the end of their checkup, Io and Airi are angered by Daichi, Joe and the innocent Hibiki for trying to peek during their checkups. Finally, Makoto briefs the Resistance at the Nagoya branch, including Ronaldo, Airi, Jungo, Joe and Otome on the Septentrione: Megrez, explaining that because of its triplicate nature, they have to attack simultaneously at all three locations to deal it any damage. As Hibiki, Daichi and Io are teleported to Osaka, Hibiki makes it clear to Makoto that they are no longer JP's members, and she acknowledges them as friends. At the same time, Yamato stands alone in wait for Megrez's appearance at the Tokyo Tower. When Hibiki and co. arrive in Osaka, Hibiki breaks into tears at his relief to find Hinako and she embraces him in gratitude. In the epilogue, Fumi shows Makoto that upon analysis of her health results, Io is a suitable spiritual medium for the demon "Lugh".
8	"Wednesday of Transformations II"; Transliteration: "4th Day Hen'yō no Suiyōbi II" (Japanese: 4TH DAY 変容の水曜日II)	Takashi Kobayashi	May 23, 2013	
The three entities of the Septentrione: Megrez finally manifest and begin approaching the barriers at Osaka, Nagoya and Tokyo. In the calm before the imminent battle, a flashback shows Ronaldo entrusting all of the uncovered data on the JP's and the Hotsuin family to Hibiki; who vows to stop Yamato's ideals. As the battle commences at all three locations, Megrez's regenerative abilities prove to be a major challenge, being able to revive and heal its wounds indefinitely. During their battle with Megrez O, Hibiki and Io receive the death clip of Ronaldo, Joe and Otome. Hibiki tries warning them to escape their own battle but they stubbornly insist on holding their posts. As Megrez N continues to plough through the city, Ronaldo has the Resistance sacrifice the Nagoya branch by destroying its foundations to immobilize Megrez N within the newly formed hole. As the Nagoya team start attacking Megrez N, Airi summons Lorelei and exposes the core with a powerful ice attack. At the same time, Hinako and Berserker, along with Yamato and Baal also expose the cores of Megrez O and T respectively, and upon Makoto's order, each group launch a simultaneous attack on the cores and finally defeat Megrez. As Megrez N begins disintegrating, it launches the last of its missiles towards a shocked Ronaldo and co., killing them instantly, with only Airi and Jungo barely surviving the blasts. As Hibiki and co. mourn their deaths Jungo notices a strange phenomenon at the horizon. In the aftermath, under the Miyashita Park, Yamato and Fumi check on a covert spiritual weapon called "Brionac". Meanwhile, as Hibiki tries to cope with the deaths of Ronaldo, Otome and Joe whilst understand everything that's happened, he is approached by Alcor. Alcor reveals to Hibiki that humanity's ordeal is a direct result of the actions of the being, Polaris, who is attempting to restore the natural order of existence from the artificial one created by humans. As Hibiki struggles to accept this ridiculous reasoning for destruction, Alcor reveals that he is the 8th Septentrione, one of Polaris' mechanisms for order restoration. Alcor further laments his anguish of being an anomaly among the Septentriones since his own existence created by Polaris, contradicts his own desire for humanity's survival, and hence he gave them the power of demon summoning to display their survival will to Polaris. As Hibiki finally notices the phenomenon at the horizon, Alcor explains that it is "the Void" i.e. the absolute erasure of existence itself, adding that once all seven days of trials are over, Polaris will appear for humanity's Arbitration. Finally, Hibiki laments on the hopelessness of the situation while Yamato tells the JP's that he doesn't believe the world can be saved.
9	"Thursday of Shock"; Transliteration: "5th Day Shōgeki no Mokuyōbi" (Japanese: 5TH DAY 衝撃の木曜日)	Shin'ichi Masaki	May 30, 2013	
Hibiki awakens on Thursday and to his surprise, finds Alcor waiting in his quarters. Over coffee they casually discuss the state of affairs. Hibiki, now believing that Alcor isn't a threat, gives him sanctuary in his JP's quarters, with a promise that he not reveal himself and what he actually is to anyone, for fear of creating a panic within JP's. Just then, Daichi and Io enter Hibiki's quarters and find Alcor, much to their shock. Although, Hibiki is forced to confide in them about Alcor's nature. Later that day, Airi and Hinako are selected by Makoto and Fumi to challenge the next Septentrione. Much to Hibiki's reluctance to let them fight, Makoto explains that the Septentrione: Alioth is scheduled to manifest in the Earth's Ionosphere, and hence, specialized long ranged demons that only Hinako and Airi can summon, stand any chance of attacking it. As Alioth manifests in the ionosphere above the Sapporo region, Hinako summons the demon Shiva at the Sapporo TV Tower while Airi summons the demon Kama over at the Kaitaku Memorial Park. Utilizing an ancient myth, the JP's has some Legion demons, bind Kama in chains and take it into position in the air. Kama's appearance angers Shiva and he attacks it with the Pasupata ability. The ability intersects with Alioth's core in the ionosphere and successfully destroys it. Afterwards, while everyone breathes a sigh of relief, Alioth's 50km outer shell plummets from the sky and falls over the Sapporo region, destroying the city and killing all the inhabitants, much to everyone's shock. Later, while going through Ronaldo's data, Hibiki struggles to come to terms with all who have died for Yamato's ideals. That evening, Yamato prepares a feast during which he tells Hibiki and co. of the coming of Polaris in two days and if they don't follow his orders they may die. Hibiki reveals to everyone that the JP's intends to use their encounter with Polaris to recreate the world the way they see fit, although, Yamato rejects this, stating that he is simply following his own ideals of creating a perfect Meritocracy. As Hibiki confronts Yamato once more, their ideals clash and with no room for consensus, promise to decide who is right on the final day. In the epilogue, Makoto tells Io that on Friday's mission, she will be sacrificed.
10	"Friday of Farewells"; Transliteration: "6th Day Sōbetsu no Kin'yōbi" (Japanese: 6TH DAY 送別の金曜日)	Hitomi Efuku	June 6, 2013	
The following morning Alcor surprises Hibiki, Daichi and Io by making breakfast for them, while Io withholds her fate from Hibiki and Daichi. Later, Alcor visits Yamato and expresses his concern over what consequences Io's death would have on Hibiki, although Yamato shows no sympathy for Alcor's anguish. Finally, Io is summoned by the JP's while Hibiki and co. are briefed on the Septentrione: Mizar's abilities of self-replication. As the group expresses concern on a battle plan, Yamato and Makoto reveal to their horror, Io inside a machine connected to the "Brionac" and their plan involving Io's sacrifice for Lugh. Furious, Hibiki demands another plan, although Yamato's logic trumps him. Finally Mizar manifests in Tokyo prompting Yamato to begin the summoning for Lugh. Simultaneously, Hibiki, Daichi and Hinako receive Io's death clip, causing Hibiki to storm out of the JP's headquarters. As Lugh manifests, Yamato assumes control of it and releases the Ryumyaku Seal at the Tokyo Metropolitan Government Building to invoke the Dragon Stream - Shakko, while at the same time Io's mind begins to erode due to the strain of maintaining Lugh. Makoto explains that Shakko connects to a parallel universe and hence, is the only thing capable of banishing Mizar before it replicates infinitely and consumes their own universe, which Yamato manipulates through Lugh and thus defeats Mizar, just as Io's mind collapses. As Hibiki arrives at the Shinjuku National Stadium, Yamato orders him to destroy Lugh (Io) who has now gained control of Io's body. Enraged at being imprisoned by the Hotsuins, Lugh makes its way to the JP's Tokyo headquarters at the National Diet Building to take Yamato's life. Lugh appears and pummels the JP's defences with little effort, but remarks on Hibiki being a worthy opponent because of his summons. Hibiki tries to communicate with Io but Lugh insults Io's will before attacking him, knocking him off the side of the building, although he is saved by Yamato. Yamato then summons Baal and makes an attempt to kill Lugh but is stopped by Hibiki, using a combination of Suzaku and Byakko to destroy Baal, much to Yamato's anger. As Lugh begins to disintegrate, it launches a last attack to kill Yamato, although Hibiki pushes him out of the way, taking the hit. Too everyone's awe, the Dragon Shakko channels the Ryumyaku's power through Hibiki and allows him to defend the attack with his bare hands via a spiritual defense. Seeing this, Yamato acknowledges Hibiki as having the same power as him and offers a partnership, but Hibiki rejects him, saying he will use his power to save everyone. As the JP's realize they no longer control the Ryumyaku, Hibiki rises into the air, still blocking Lugh's attacks and is able to reach out to Io, reaffirming his promise that they will survive together and is able to successfully separate her from Lugh. No longer having a spiritual medium, Lugh is destroyed while Hibiki embraces Io, vowing to protect her, while Yamato remarks that Hibiki brought a miracle. In the epilogue, Hibiki and Io plummet to the ground, with the former sustaining severe injuries due to the power of the Ryumyaku. Yamato has the JP's treat Hibiki's wounds before stating to Io that he will kill them all if they stand in his way.
11	"Saturday of Variances"; Transliteration: "7th Day Sorezore no Doyōbi" (Japanese: 7TH DAY それぞれの土曜日)	Takashi Kobayashi	June 13, 2013	
Hibiki is put into intensive care at the JP's' Tokyo Branch. As the demon summoners look on, Io can't help but feel responsible for his current condition, although she is comforted by Jungo and Airi. Meanwhile, Alcor is visited by Botis and Bilfrons, the former of whom tries to attack him because of his supportive stance on the humans but is easily destroyed by Alcor. Elsewhere, Fumi updates the JP's phone software based on the Nicaea app to enable stronger demon summons. The next day, Io, Daichi, Airi, Jungo and Hinako have breakfast together in a single moment of peace and officially introduce themselves to each other. As they go to exchange emails, they all simultaneously receive each other's death clips. Suddenly the last Septentrione: Benetnasch appears and destroys the Sapporo barrier with a single attack allowing the Void to consume the region. As Fumi outlines that it possesses the abilities of its predecessors, the Osaka and Nagoya regions are wiped out each with a single blast. Yamato then orders everyone to begin the operation. A flashback into Hibiki's past shows him growing up with strict parents. At a playground Daichi defends Hibiki from some bullies and the two quickly become best friends. After being able to enter high school, Hibiki's father warns him of choosing his friends carefully, but he chooses to reject this ideal and remain friends with the carefree Daichi. Simultaneously, Hibiki regains consciousness and tears at his sudden reminiscence. Meanwhile, Benetnasch eradicates the Diet Building in a blast equivalent to a nuclear explosion, rocking the city and exposing the Ryumyaku seal beneath its foundations. Here, Yamato has the JP's channel all of the Ryumyaku's power through him while creating a shield to defend from Benetnasch's attack. At the same time, Makoto and co. summon their demons and launch a barrage of attacks at Benetnasch which seem to overwhelm it. However, it suddenly splits part of itself off and emits a particular frequency that forcefully cancels their demon summons. Having anticipated this, Fumi, summons Trumpeter and has it neutralize Benetnasch's frequency. After warning Makoto to monopolize on the opportunity, Makoto receives Fumi's death clip, just as Benetnasch kills her with Phecda's laser. Realizing that protecting the summoners is wasted effort, Yamato cancels his shield. This allows Benetnasch to use Megrez's ability and launch multiple Dubhe clones which explode and kill Airi, Jungo and Hinako much to Daichi and Io's horror. Just as Daichi, Io and Makoto are about to be attacked, Hibiki appears and protects them with Suzaku. When he learns of his friends' deaths he charges at Benetnasch in a blind rage and defends an attack using Shakko's power. Angered by Yamato's abandonment of everyone, Hibiki begins debating within the heat of battle but again to no consensus. Just then, Benetnasch attacks them both with a powerful strike, but they are able to defend by combining their shields, which gradually begin weakening as Benetnasch focuses its power. No longer being able to sit and watch Hibiki die, Daichi summons the powerful Black Frost and with its help, they successfully destroy Benetnasch and survive the seven days of trials. In the aftermath, Yamato states that if Hibiki cannot kill him to stop his ideals, then he would take his life instead. Although Alcor appears and refuses to let Hibiki die.
12	"Sunday of Realization I"; Transliteration: "Last Day Ketsujitsu no Nichiyōbi I" (Japanese: LAST DAY 結実の日曜日I)	Hiroyuki Hashimoto	June 20, 2013	
With the Trials of Polaris behind them, Alcor appears before Hibiki and co. and states that he intends on killing Yamato of his own free will and in doing so, entrusting the fate of the world to Hibiki, a battle which Yamato accepts. As their battle begins, Hibiki explains to Daichi and Io what would happen to the world if Yamato has his way after meeting with Polaris. While attacking Yamato with tentacles, Alcor realizes that Yamato had been steadily drawing him closer to the Tokyo Tower to enhance his use of the Ryumyaku. Afterwards, they take a short pause and exchange threats. Alcor expresses his support of Hibiki's future since he was treated as an actual person when with him, although Yamato retorts that Alcor should revert to being a mindless tool, and if so, he would be allowed to see his vision of the future. Just then, they both receive each other's death clips. Hibiki also receives their death clips and decides to keep his promise to Yamato by stopping him. Makato then makes her intentions of aiding Yamato until the end known, while lamenting on the pain she had brought to Hibiki and his friends under his orders. Makoto explains that before Yamato took her in, she had lost hope for the future, but he gave her a sense of purpose and brought a semblance of meaning into her life, and hence, is willing to aid him. As Hibiki tries to talk her out of it, along with Daichi and Io, receive her death clip, before she finally requests that they take care of Yamato before flying towards the battlefield on Power. As their battle continues, Alcor overwhelms Yamato, even easily destroying Cerberus. Although, since the Nicaea app is able to summon stronger demons based on a user's growth, Yamato tries to download stronger demons but not fast enough as it happens and is impaled in the leg by Alcor's tentacle attack. However, before Alcor can follow through and finish Yamato, he is distracted by Power before Makoto jumps in front of Yamato, acting as a human shield and is fatally impaled by Alcor's attack. Her death gives Yamato enough time to finish his download and summon the demons Nebiros and Zaou-Gongen. Alcor immediately acknowledges their strength before he is overwhelmed to the brink of defeat. Afterwards, laying in his crater at the foot of the Tokyo Tower, Alcor tries to understand why Yamato chose his path when he could have helped the world to which he realizes that in his own way, Yamato had been fighting against the corrupt nature of the world. Even after this realization, Alcor, still willing to protect Hibiki, binds them both in his tentacles. At the end, a flashback shows Alcor blaming himself for causing Yamato to end up on his ill path. In the present, Hibiki arrives and watches in horror as Alcor rises into the air with Yamato and self destructs, killing them both. As Hibiki mourns their deaths, Yamato suddenly appears from the sky to a shocked Hibiki, having survived the attack by using the Ryumyaku at the last moment. At that moment, the last vestiges of the present world begin to crumble and be engulfed by the Void. As the Transport Terminal to Polaris appears, Yamato releases his demons on Hibiki before stepping into it and teleporting. Nebiros and Zaou-Gongen begin to attack Hibiki but are stopped by Io and Daichi who urge Hibiki to go on while they hold off the demons. With their last fateful reunion behind him, Hibiki tearfully leaves his friends and makes his way to the Terminal. As the Void finally reaches and begins engulfing them, Daichi and Io's memories begin to fade. While pondering the bright future Hibiki will create they are both killed. As the world is finally annihilated by the Void, Hibiki activates the Terminal and teleports to a new plane of existence where he meets Yamato. Realizing that Polaris will only meet with one of them, they both summon Byakko and Cerberus and begin their final climactic battle for the right to recreate the world.
13	"Sunday of Realization II"; Transliteration: "Last Day Ketsujitsu no Nichiyōbi II" (Japanese: LAST DAY 結実の日曜日II)	Yoshimichi Hirai	June 27, 2013	
Not having anymore hesitation to fight, Hibiki reminds Yamato of their promise of defeating him and having an audience with Polaris. As their battle begins, Yamato notes that Hibiki is driven by his anger towards him and his warped reasoning behind sacrificing the lives of everyone. Although, Hibiki defends by stating that as a human, he cannot allow such injustice to prevail, causing Yamato to question his own humanity. As Hibiki defends an attack using Shakko's power, Yamato acknowledges him as an equal and reveals that their current situation had all been part of a grand scheme put into motion by Polaris since the moment of their births. However since Polaris itself is flawed by its own nature, it had left it up to humanity to decide amongst themselves who should survive until the end, whilst citing the anomaly of Alcor's nature as proof of this. This truth shocks Hibiki, but Yamato simply brushes it off as semantics in his goal to reshape the world into a meritocracy. As their debate continues, Hibiki desperately tries to defend the previous world that he and his friends fought so hard to protect, although Yamato remains adamant in his reasoning that those with power have a responsibility to erase the cancerous nature of humanity's current train of thought which had led to world built on corrupt foundations while simultaneously exposing Hibiki's naivety. As Hibiki tries to explain how people can work together, he tries to get Yamato to realize that they had been friends all along because of their actions, but Yamato rejects the very notion of friendship, claiming that it is weak. As Yamato starts to show injuries from his previous battle with Alcor, Cerberus weakens a bit and Byakko utilizes the opportunity to eradicate them both with a lightning attack. Hibiki once again tries to assert his friendship with Yamato, claiming that they don't have a reason to fight although Yamato chooses not to accept this, since disregarding his goals after coming this far would only hurt his dignity. Hence, much to Hibiki's despair, he chooses to continue the battle and fuses Nebiros and Zaou-Gongen into Satan. Hibiki tries to defend against Satan's first attack with Shakko, put it proves too weak and Shakko is destroyed. Bidding him farewell, Yamato once again attacks Hibiki with a final devastating attack. In the attack's wake, both Yamato and Hibiki are shocked to discover Black Frost protecting Hibiki. Hibiki's phone then receives all the demons of his deceased friends and begins his counterattack to a stunned Yamato. Hibiki then uses all of his newly acquired demons in a six-step fusion to summon the demon Lucifer and clashes with Satan. As the force of Lucifer's attack injures Yamato's cheek, they then put all of their remaining strength into one final decisive attack. In the aftermath, Hibiki embraces Yamato and tearfully explains the error in his ways, before Yamato admits defeat and dies. As Hibiki looks into the sky, Polaris' silhouette appears and Hibiki asks for his wish... Hibiki waits for Daichi after their practice exams, and they head to a local cafe where they discuss their respective futures. Daichi introduces Hibiki to a newly popular website called "Nicaea" which supposedly shows the death clips of friends. Afterwards, as they wait at the subway station, Daichi embarrassingly notices Io Nitta and wishes he could be friends with her. Taking an initiative Hibiki calls out to her much to Daichi's shock. As the three meet and have a friendly conversation, Hibiki starts involuntarily crying, which worries both Io and Daichi, but Hibiki claims that he is just happy for some reason. As the train arrives, Hibiki has a sudden realization and rushes out of the station and back into the street. As he runs towards an unknown destination, he vividly recalls the events of the past week. Meanwhile, Keita, Hinako, Otome, Airi, Jungo, Joe, Ronaldo, Fumi, and Makoto live their lives out normally. Eventually Hibiki arrives at the National Diet Building and begs the guards to let him see Yamato, although they refuse based on his vague reasoning. Eventually, a limo exits the building and Hibiki notices Yamato, who does not acknowledge him on the account that he possesses no friends, but smiles knowingly at Hibiki, indicating that he remembers him. As the limo leaves, Hibiki breaks into tears, relieved that Yamato is alive and remember everything. Yamato comments that it's a good day, Makoto shows concern for Yamato but he states that he is fine while brushing a scar on his left cheek. Elsewhere, atop the Tokyo Tower, Alcor thinks about Hibiki's definition on what Life really means for humanity, and is optimistic about their future before vanishing. Finally, Hibiki looks towards the sky while asserting humanity's will to keep on living.

== Home media ==
Pony Canyon released the series in Japan on seven Blu-ray and DVD volumes between June 19 and December 18, 2013. The company later released the entire series on a Blu-ray box set in Japan on January 30, 2015. The complete series was released by Sentai Filmworks on DVD and Blu-ray format on July 1, 2014, and April 21, 2015 respectively. Hanabee Entertainment issued their releases on September 3, 2014 and May 6, 2015. MVM Entertainment released the series on DVD format on October 20, 2014. These releases contained English and Japanese audio options and English subtitles.

Pony Canyon (Region 2 - Japan)
Vol.	Episodes	Artwork		Bonus disc	Release date	Ref.
Vol.	Episodes	Blu-ray	Bonus poster	Bonus disc	Release date	Ref.
1	1	Hibiki Kuze	Hibiki Kuze and Alcor	Original Soundtrack Volume 1	June 19, 2013	
2	2, 3	Io Nitta	Io Nitta & Daichi Shijima	Drama CD Volume 1	July 17, 2013	
3	4, 5	Fumi Kanno	Makoto Sako & Fumi Kanno	Original Soundtrack Volume 2	August 21, 2013	
4	6, 7	Hinako Kujou	Hinako Kujou & Keita Wakui	Drama CD Volume 2	September 18, 2013	
5	8, 9	Airi Ban	Airi Ban & Jungo Torii	—	October 16, 2013	
6	10, 11	Makoto Sako	Otome Yanagiya & Yuzuru Akie	—	November 20, 2013	
7	12, 13	Alcor	Yamato Hotsuin & Ronaldo Kuriki	Drama CD Volume 3	December 18, 2013	

Sentai Filmworks (Region 1 - North America)
Vol.	Episodes	Artwork	Release date	Ref.
DVD	1–13	Hibiki Kuze	July 1, 2014	
BD	1–13	Hibiki Kuze	April 21, 2015	

Hanabee Entertainment (Region 4 - Australia / New Zealand)
Vol.	Episodes	Artwork	Release date	Ref.
DVD	1–13	Hibiki Kuze & Daichi Shijima	September 3, 2014	
BD	1–13	Hibiki Kuze & Daichi Shijima	May 6, 2015	

MVM Entertainment (Region 2 - United Kingdom)
Vol.	Episodes	Artwork	Release date	Ref.
DVD	1–13	Hibiki Kuze	October 20, 2014	
