= Digimon Story: Time Stranger =

2025 video game

- Developer: Media.Vision
- Publisher: Bandai Namco Entertainment
- Director: Yusuke Tomono
- Producer: Ryosuke Hara
- Artist: Suzuhito Yasuda
- Composer: Masafumi Takada
- Series: Digimon
- Platforms: PlayStation 5; Xbox Series X/S; Windows; Nintendo Switch; Nintendo Switch 2
- Release: PS5, Xbox Series: JP: October 2, 2025; WW: October 3, 2025; Windows: WW: October 3, 2025; Nintendo Switch, Nintendo Switch 2: WW: July 10, 2026
- Genre: Role-playing
- Mode: Single-player

Digimon Story: Time Stranger (Note: Japanese: デジモンストーリー タイムストレンジャー, Hepburn: Dejimon Sutōrī: Taimu Sutorenjā) is a 2025 role-playing video game developed by Media.Vision and published by Bandai Namco Entertainment. It is the seventh game in the Story subseries of Digimon games, releasing eight years after Digimon Story: Cyber Sleuth – Hacker's Memory. It was released for PlayStation 5, Xbox Series X/S, and Windows on October 3, 2025, (Note: In Japan, October 2 for consoles and October 3 for Windows via Steam.) and was released for Nintendo Switch and Nintendo Switch 2 on July 10, 2026.

The title continues the international expansion that began as early as 2016 with Digimon Story: Cyber Sleuth, whose release outside Asia was driven by strong interest in the North American market for the Digimon animated series. By the early 2020s, the IP’s overall revenue was coming primarily from international markets. Time Stranger thus became the first entry in the Story series to feature an English dub and translations into 11 languages.

Digimon Story: Time Stranger was developed as a new entry point aimed at both longtime fans and newcomers, and quickly generated a notable spike in interest despite facing significant competition, particularly in Western markets, where it exceeded expectations and enjoyed a strong launch on PC. It became the fastest-selling Digimon title in the series, particularly in North America, where the game remained among the best-selling releases. The Digimon brand and its various releases over the last few years have brought Bandai’s IP to record profitability, led by Time Stranger, 26 years after the franchise's original economic boom, which was driven by the activities surrounding the original anime's peak. Critics have noted that its success is partly driven by the nostalgic appeal it holds for millennials, a particularly important demographic within the broader Digimon audience who grew up with the 1999 animated series. The game was generally well received thanks to a formula considered more engaging than that of previous titles. Critics nevertheless pointed to its linearity, reliance on Japanese genre conventions, and technical shortcomings.

== Development ==
Digimon Story: Time Stranger was announced on December 8, 2017, just before the release of Digimon Story: Cyber Sleuth – Hacker's Memory. Producer Kazumasa Habu, who referred to Time Stranger only as "a completely new Digimon Story project", stated that Hacker's Memory was developed in parallel with Time Stranger as not to "dampen the fans' enthusiasm" with a long wait between releases. A year later, on September 12, 2018, Habu reconfirmed the game's development and announced Digimon Survive – scheduled for release in 2019 and made because Time Stranger's development "still [had] some time to go." (Note: Digimon Survive would eventually release in July 2022.)

On February 27, 2022, Habu once again confirmed that the Digimon Story game was being worked on. He revealed that the game would take place in the Digital World and would feature the Olympos XII as the main characters. On February 20, 2024, Habu revealed he had no longer been working on Digimon games since April 2023. He stated Time Stranger, still referring to it as "the new Digimon Story", was still being worked on but that someone else had taken over his role.

On February 12, 2025, Time Stranger's first trailer was shown on the PlayStation 5 in a State of Play stream. Earlier that day, the game had been leaked via retailer GameStop when outlet Gematsu found preorder pages on their site for the PlayStation 5 and Xbox Series X versions. On June 4, 2025, Bandai Namco announced a worldwide launch date of October 3, 2025, and detailed the game's various editions. A March 19 trailer at Digimon Con 2025, a July 2 trailer presented by producer Ryosuke Hara, and another released on August 27 provided an overview of the game's story, characters, and setting. On September 10 and September 11, 2025, the game's demo released on PlayStation 5, Xbox Series X/S, and Windows.

On February 5, 2026 during the Nintendo Direct: Partner Showcase, Time Stranger was announced to be coming to the Nintendo Switch and Nintendo Switch 2 on July 10, 2026. The Switch 2 version features two modes, one with enhanced visuals at 4K 30fps, and the other a performance mode at 1080p 60fps. This feature will be added as free update for the original platforms as well. On March 26, at the Digimon Con 2026 event, it was announced the game would get a "large scale DLC expansion" in 2027. The trailer for this expansion, titled A Hero’s Eternal Legacy, featuring a new protagonist and over 50 new Digimon, was released in September.

=== Soundtrack ===
The game’s soundtrack is composed by Masafumi Takada, marking his return to the series following his work on earlier entries. The main theme song is titled “Wherever You Are” and is performed by Reche. There are two versions of the song, both by Reche, Japanese and English. A themed song video was released showcasing gameplay and voiced scenes over the song Additionally, the game offers a DLC pack titled “Digimon Anime Song Pack” which includes 16 classic tracks from the Digimon anime series.

== Plot ==
Digimon Story: Time Stranger follows male or female protagonist Dan (結城 ダン, Yūki Dan) or Kanan Yūki (結城 カナン, Yūki Kanan), an agent of the organization ADAMAS, a covert group investigating digital anomalies in Tokyo. During an operation in Shinjuku, the agent witnesses a catastrophic event known as the Shinjuku Inferno, in which a war between Digimon breaks out and devastates the area. The incident propels the agent eight years into the past, where they must uncover the cause of the disaster and prevent the collapse of both the human and Digital Worlds. There, they meet a girl named Inori Misono and Aegiomon, a Digimon who was saved by Inori.

While trying to investigate incidents caused by Digimon in the real world, the three of them are caught in a space-time rift that brings them into the Digital World of Illiad, a realm where the Digimon reside. There, they learn of a civil war caused by a gang of Digimon known as the Titans, which is responsible for anomalies in both the Digital World and the real world. It is revealed that Aegiomon is the reincarnation of Chronomon, a Digimon known as the Great Guardian who had defeated the Titans in the past. Aegiomon and the agent are tasked with stopping the Titans' attacks and bringing peace to Illiad, a conflict which eventually spills over into the real world and results in a clash that propels the agent back to the present alongside Aegiomon and Inori.

The agent finds out that the actions they took in the past had resulted in changes to the present, where rifts that connect the Digital World to the real world have opened and caused large amounts of Digimon to flood into the latter. In Illiad, Titan forces have taken over much of the world, leading to events that result in the deaths of various Digimon. Aegiomon, and eventually the agent, slowly gain the power to go back in time, which they use to stop Titan forces and prevent the deaths of their Digimon allies. Back in the real world, the government's anti-Digimon military branch, D-SAT, unleashes a giant weapon known as the Giant Slayer to eradicate all Digimon in the real world. A clash between the Giant Slayer and the Digimon war that had spilled into the real world causes the Shinjuku Inferno, resulting in a giant space-time rift that swallows up Inori and leads to a distraught Aegiomon following after her.

Now alone, the agent continues using their power to go back in time to stop the Titan conflict and delay Shinjuku Inferno from occurring. They eventually learn the truth behind Chronomon–rather than a hero that fought the Titans, Chronomon had actually worked with the Titans to rebel against the higher being of the world, Homeostasis. This ultimately failed, and Chronomon was imprisoned within time itself to act as a keeper that would oversee the flow of time. The true cause of the Shinjuku Inferno, Chronomon's goal is to create a time-space distruption large enough to free itself from its duties and be put to rest by Aegiomon, its own vessel. The agent also discovers their own true identity as one of Aegiomon's shadows born from his repeated attempts to turn back time and save Inori, given a human appearance by Homeostasis to put an end to Aegiomon's time loops.

The agent reunites with Aegiomon, convincing the latter to end the time loops and the repeated cycle of destruction orchestrated by Chronomon. Aegiomon merges with the agent and all of his shadows from across different timelines to digivolve into Jupitermon, proceeding to take down the Giant Slayer and finally preventing the Shinjuku Inferno. The clash allows Aegiomon and the agent to recover Inori from the time-space rift. The three of them, alongside Digimon apostles who were saved by the time loops, head into the final battle against Chronomon, whose soul has now merged with the remains of the Giant Slayer. Although they successfully lay Chronomon to rest, Aegiomon, as Jupitermon, must replace Chronomon as the keeper of time, separating from Inori and creating a new timeline where the Digital World and the real world were never brought together. The agent is tasked by Jupitermon to watch over Inori in the new timeline.

In a post-credits scene, Jupitermon and his Digimon apostles form the Olympos XII, vowing to maintain the peace in Illiad.

== Reception ==
=== Pre-release ===
Reviewing a three-hour preview session of Time Stranger, Jess Reyes of GameSpot called it "a promising comeback that I didn't want to stop playing" and cited "older fans who watched Digimon Adventure" as a major target audience. Reyes called collecting Digimon the best part of the game, praised the battle system as "possibly the most comprehensive the series has seen yet", and stated that the narrative "took a backseat to the enjoyable battles and creature collecting".

David Lumb of CNET, also reviewing the preview session, called the "expansive possibilities" of Digimon team building "exactly what [hardcore roleplaying game fans] have been waiting for" and called the combat rich and deep with "quality-of-life considerations that remove some tedium from the level-up grind." He recommended it to "Pokémon diehards" due to its complexity.

Ethan Gach of Kotaku, who played a preview for 90 minutes, called the soundtrack "unusually stellar", the cinematics "more polished" than Cyber Sleuth's, and the gameplay systems "a great foundation to work with." He concluded in the review's title: "I don't care about Digimon, and I'm still hyped for Digimon Story: Time Stranger" and said that the game "doesn't deserve to be overshadowed" by Pokémon Legends: Z-A.

=== Post-release ===
Reception

Aggregate score
Aggregator	Score
OpenCritic	81% recommend (Note: Based on 111 reviews)

The PlayStation 5 and PC versions of Digimon Story: Time Stranger both received "generally favorable" reviews from critics, according to the review aggregation website Metacritic. In Japan, four critics from Famitsu gave the game a total score of 34 out of 40.

=== Sales ===
On October 2, 2025, Digimon Story: Time Stranger came out 14 days before the release of Pokémon Legends: Z-A.. In this wake, the RPG enjoyed strong initial popularity on Steam, with 84,000 concurrent players (compared to 6,000 for Digimon Survive and 3,500 for Cyber Sleuth) during its launch weekend : one of the highest peaks ever recorded by a Japanese RPG on that platform. This was followed by a 95% drop in player numbers the following month.

In Japan, publisher Bandai Namco stated that Time Stranger exceeded initial expectations, announcing that physical copies had sold out. It was reported there were 23,779 physical copies sold. It ranked 9th on the national chart in its second week, though sales dropped by more than 72% (to 6,595 units sold) and fell below 4,000 in its third week. Time Stranger sold a total of 42,776 physical copies in Japan, Digimon Story: Time Stranger sold in 15,644 physical copies on Nintendo Switch 2 and 11,251 copies on Nintendo Switch in Japan during its first week on the market in 2026.

In Europe, Digimon Story: Time Stranger topped the sales charts in its major markets on PC and consoles. Upon its release, it ranked 4th in units sold on the European GSD chart and 3rd in terms of revenues. European sales of this title were 6th spot in the market in terms of sales revenue during its second week.

In the United Kingdom, within two days, the game entered the country’s weekly overall chart at No. 14 and ranked 13th on the best-seller list during its first week. In Germany, Time Stranger debuted at No. 3 in physical sales on PlayStation 5 and was the 6th best-selling title across all platforms in October. In France, Digimon Story: Time Stranger ranked 8th in Steam sales during its first week, 9th during its second, and 23rd during its third, before remaining in the top 100 best-selling titles by revenue for three more consecutive weeks.

In the United States, Digimon Story: Time Stranger is the highest-grossing title in the entire franchise, according to Circana’s retail sales analytics service. Within two days, the game across all platforms ranked 13th on the U.S. sales chart for the period from August 31 to October 4, 2025, as well as second among the highest-grossing PC games. It also ranked 7th upon release in U.S. PlayStation Store sales and held onto the 8th spot the following week. Time Stranger had the 9th highest sales in October 2025 on the overall U.S. sales chart and ranked 20th in November.

In total, Digimon Story: Time Stranger sold 241,000 copies on PlayStation 5 in October 2025. As of December 12, 2025, Time Stranger became the fastest-selling Digimon title worldwide, surpassing the 1 million unit mark in 69 days.

=== Accolades ===
Year	Award	Category	Result	Ref.
2026	Japan Game Awards	Award for Excellence	Won	
