= Robot: Super Color Comic =

Japanese manga anthology

- Cover of the first English volume
- Genre: Adventure, Romantic comedy, Fantasy, Science fiction
- Manga
- Written by: Various
- Published by: Wanimagazine
- English publisher: NA: Digital Manga Publishing, UDON & d/visual
- Original run: October 21, 2004 – February 7, 2008
- Volumes: 10

Robot is a series of books containing the art of various Asian artists, created by Range Murata and published by Wanimagazine. Volume 1 was released on October 21, 2004, and ten volumes have currently been released.

Digital Manga Publishing was originally responsible for the North American distribution, with the first volume being released August 6, 2005. However, due to talks over publishing negotiations breaking down, DMP stopped publishing Robot after Volume 3. Rights for publications were picked up by UDON Entertainment in a collaboration with d/visual who was in charge for the translation; both began distribution on December 24, 2007, with Volume 4 with the plan of releasing all subsequent releases on a quarterly basis, but has since halted after releasing volume 5.

== Artists involved ==
- Keith Seifert
- Hiroyuki Asada
- Yoshitoshi Abe
- Mami Itō
- Inuburo
- Kouji Ogata
- Okama
- Yū Kinutani
- Yūsuke Kozaki
- Sabe
- Kei Sanbe
- Shou Tajima
- Hakekyo Tashiro
- Yumi Tada
- Range Murata
- Chicken
- Teikoku Shōnen
- Dowman Sayman
- Kei Tōme
- Tokiya
- Shin Nagasawa
- Hanaharu Naruko
- Mii Nekoi
- Pinfen
- Kazumasa Hirai
- Jirō Kuwata
- Kamui Fujiwara
- Eizō Hōden
- Shigeki Maeshima
- Hirotaka Maeda
- Yasuto Miura
- Mitsukazu Mihara
- Michio Murakawa
- Suzuhito Yasuda
- Yamato Yamamoto
- YUG
- Kengo Yonekura
- Roboinu
- Rco Wada
- Kawayō
- Osamu Kobayashi
- Makoto Kobayashi
- Haccan
- Jun Fuji
- Miggy
- Enomoto
- Hyung-tae Kim
- Shuzilow Ha
- D.K
- Ugetsu Hakua
- BABYsue

== Figures ==
Various characters from the first volume were made into a figure collection. Figures included were:

- Groundpass Drive by Range Murata
- ...of the Planetarium by Sho-U Tajima
- Pez and Hot Strawberry by Hiroyuki Asada
- Dragon Fly by Shigeki Maeshima
- Ebony and Ivory by Suzuhito Yasuda
- Eventyr by Haccan

== Reception ==
In Jason Thompson's addendum to Manga: The Complete Guide, he describes it as "an original dôjinshi with fabulous production values".
