= Digimon Story Lost Evolution =

2010 video game

Digimon Story: Lost Evolution
- Developer(s): BEC
- Publisher(s): Bandai Namco Games
- Series: Digimon
- Platform(s): Nintendo DS
- Release: JP: July 1, 2010
- Genre(s): Role-playing, simulation
- Mode(s): Single-player

Digimon Story: Lost Evolution (Note: Japanese: デジモンストーリー ロストエボリューション, Hepburn: Dejimon Sutōrī Rosuto Eboryūshon) is a role-playing video game published by Bandai Namco Games for the Nintendo DS. It is the third game in the Digimon Story series, part of the greater Digimon franchise. The title was released exclusively in Japan on July 1, 2010.

== Plot ==
Players assume the role of either Shu (シュウ) or Kizuna (キズナ), male and female Japanese fifth-graders respectively, who have just moved to a new district. After witnessing a luminous object falling into the mountains during a fireworks ceremony, they are transported to the Digital World, where they meet their Digimon partners. They are joined by classmates Hiroyuki (ヒロユキ), a curious troublemaker, and Asuka (アスカ), a caring, older-sister type, along with Hiroyuki's second-grade younger sister Yui (ユイ) and her friend, a first-grader named Takuto (タクト). Together, they must aid their Digimon companions while thwarting a group of villains named Uno, Dos, and Tres.

== Development ==
In November 2009, Bandai Namco Games launched a teaser website with a countdown to the reveal of a new title referred to only as "RPG_LOST" and "The RPG that will return". On November 20, the timer reached zero and officially revealed Digimon Story: Lost Evolution, along with a release date set for the following year. The game received a final release date the following April, along with an official website that revealed additional content as visitors completed minigames.

== Fan translation ==
A fan translation by Operation Decoded, who had fan translated previous Nintendo DS Digimon games, was released on January 1, 2023.

== Reception ==
Reception

Review score
Publication	Score
Famitsu	30/40

Digimon Story: Lost Evolution received a 30 out of 40 total score in Japanese Weekly Famitsu magazine, based on individual reviews of 8, 8, 7, and 7. The game debuted as the 5th-highest selling title of its debut week, selling 42,153 copies.
