= Digimon Story: Cyber Sleuth =

2015 video game

- North American cover art
- Developer: Media.Vision (Note: Ported to Nintendo Switch and Windows by h.a.n.d.)
- Publisher: Bandai Namco Entertainment
- Directors: Tetsuya Okubo; Syuhei Oka
- Producer: Kazumasa Habu
- Designer: Hideaki Kikuchi
- Programmer: Masanori Kodo
- Artists: Suzuhito Yasuda; Kenji Watanabe
- Composer: Masafumi Takada
- Series: Digimon
- Platforms: PlayStation Vita, PlayStation 4, Nintendo Switch, Windows
- Release: March 12, 2015: PlayStation Vita; JP: March 12, 2015; NA: February 2, 2016; EU: February 5, 2016 PlayStation 4; NA: February 2, 2016; EU: February 5, 2016; JP: December 14, 2017 Nintendo Switch; JP: October 17, 2019; NA: October 18, 2019; EU: October 18, 2019 Windows; NA: October 18, 2019; EU: October 18, 2019; JP: August 5, 2026
- Genre: Role-playing
- Modes: Single-player, multiplayer

Digimon Story: Cyber Sleuth (Note: Japanese: デジモンストーリー サイバースルゥース, Hepburn: Dejimon Sutōrī Saibā Surūsu) is a role-playing video game developed by Media.Vision and published by Bandai Namco Entertainment that was released in Japan on March 12, 2015 for PlayStation Vita and PlayStation 4. Part of the Digimon franchise, the game is the fifth installment in the Digimon Story series, following 2011's Super Xros Wars, and the first to be released on home consoles. The game was released in North America on February 2, 2016, becoming the first installment of the Digimon Story series to be released in North America since 2007's Digimon World Dawn and Dusk, and the first to be released under its original title.

A sequel, titled Digimon Story: Cyber Sleuth – Hacker's Memory, was released in Japan in 2017 and in Western territories in 2018. In July 2019, a port of the game and its sequel for Nintendo Switch and Windows, was announced for release on October 18, 2019, as Digimon Story Cyber Sleuth: Complete Edition, although the PC version was released a day early. The PC versions were released in Japan on August 5, 2026.

== Gameplay ==
Digimon Story: Cyber Sleuth is a role-playing game, played from a third-person perspective where players control a human character with the ability to command Digimon, digital creatures with their own unique abilities who do battle against other Digimon. Players can choose between either Palmon, Terriermon or Hagurumon as their starting partner at the beginning of the game, with more able to be obtained as they make their way into new areas. A total of 249 unique Digimon are featured, including seven that were available as DLC throughout the life of the game, and two which were exclusive to the Western release. The title features a New Game Plus mode where players retain all of their Digimon, non-key items, money, memory, sleuth rank, scan percentages, and Digifarm progress.

The Complete Edition includes the 92 new Digimon from Hacker's Memory, for a total of 341 Digimon.

== Plot ==
Aiba (Note: The player can choose whether Aiba is male or female.) is a young Japanese student. After receiving a message from a hacker, Aiba joins the physical-interaction cyberspace network EDEN, where they meet Nokia Shiramine and Arata Sanada. The hacker gives them "Digimon Capture" programs used to command Digimon scripts. Aiba is attacked by a mysterious creature and becomes a digital entity.

Aiba is rescued and recruited by detective Kyoko Kuremi. Aiba investigates a hospital ward overseen by Kamishiro Enterprises, which owns and manages EDEN, and finds it filled with patients of "EDEN Syndrome," where users of EDEN fall into comas. Aiba meets Yuuko Kamishiro, the daughter of Kamishiro's former president, and learns that her older brother is a victim of EDEN Syndrome from a failed beta test eight years ago covered up by Kamishiro.

Meanwhile, Aiba assists Arata in investigating "Digital Shifts" around Tokyo. They meet Akemi Suedou, who identifies the creature behind the Digital Shifts as an Eater: a digital entity that consumes users' mental data, causing EDEN Syndrome and Aiba's condition.

Aiba and their allies learn that the Eaters, which were created from negative human emotions, had attacked the Digital World; the Digital World's ruler, King Drasil, ordered the Royal Knights to stop the attacks, but some Knights advocated destroying humanity to wipe out the Eaters at their source. Rie, the current president of Kamishiro, reveals herself as the Royal Knight Crusadermon. Arata encounters Suedou, who reveals that he developed and distributed the Digimon Capture program.

Aiba's half-digital body is beginning to destabilize, and a massive Digital Shift allowed Digimon to enter the real world. The group searches for the other Royal Knights in the hopes of convincing them to favor peace. Aiba, Nokia, and Yuuko learn of the EDEN beta test eight years ago; Kamishiro sent Arata, Nokia, Aiba, Yuuko, and her brother Yuugo into the Beta, but they found a portal to the Digital World and an Eater consumed Yuugo, leaving him unconscious in the real world and the first EDEN Syndrome victim; the other children fled back to EDEN, leaving the portal open, allowing more Eaters to enter the Digital World. To cover up the disaster, Suedou erased the memories of the remaining four children.

Shortly after, Aiba and Arata encounter Suedou inside another Digital Shift; Arata is consumed by an Eater, but Suedou rescues him. Arata is suddenly obsessed with becoming stronger and leaves with Suedou. Aiba and their friends recruit most of the Royal Knights to their cause.

To defeat Crusadermon, Kyoko reveals herself as the Royal Knight "Alphamon". Alphamon explains to Aiba that the "real" Kyoko and Rie were humans who were attacked by Eaters and inflicted with EDEN Syndrome, and that Alphamon and Crusadermon possessed their comatose bodies to hide in the human world, but unaware of each other. Despite Crusadermon's defeat, however, Alphamon informs Aiba that Crusadermon's leader intends to destroy humanity alone and soon.

Aiba and Alphamon are confronted by Arata, who reveals Suedou had sparked his memory of the beta test incident and his despair at being unable to save Yuugo. Arata transforms into an Eater and attacks Aiba, but Aiba defeats the Eater and saves Arata. After stopping Crusadermon's leader, Suedou appears and tells the group that they can stop the Eaters by traveling to the Digital World and extracting Yuugo from the "Mother Eater," which will make it so that Eaters never existed. The group arrives to find that the Mother Eater has completely taken over King Drasil; after defeating it, Aiba rescues Yuugo, but Yuugo reveals that he had been acting as a central conscience and holding the Eaters back.

Suedou becomes the Mother Eater's new conscience, hoping to create a world without misery. Aiba defeats it and enters the Mother Eater to rescue Suedou. Suedou, amazed that Aiba would risk their own existence to save him, allows King Drasil to revert both worlds to a state in which contact with the Digimon never occurred. In this reality, only Nokia, Arata, Yuugo, Yuuko, and perhaps Aiba remember the events; Rie is an ordinary human, and Suedou was never born. Later, Aiba meets Kyoko, who doesn't remember them and invites them to work as her assistant.

== Development ==
Digimon Story: Cyber Sleuth was first announced for the PlayStation Vita in a December 2013 issue of Japanese V Jump magazine, although its projected release date was still more than a year away. A teaser trailer was revealed near the end of the month on the official website, with a release window of Spring 2015 slated in a later September 2014 issue of V Jump. The game was developed by Media.Vision, and features character designs by Suzuhito Yasuda, known for his work on Shin Megami Tensei: Devil Survivor and Durarara!!.

In June 2015, Amazon Canada listed a North American version of Digimon Story: Cyber Sleuth under the title "Digimon World: Cyber Sleuth" for the PlayStation 4, hinting for a release in the region. Bandai Namco Games later confirmed English-language releases in North America and Europe for 2016, which would be a retail title for the PlayStation 4, and digital release for the PlayStation Vita. An English trailer was showcased at the 2015 Tokyo Game Show, with a final North American release date of February 2, 2016 announced the following month. Pre-order DLC bonuses for the North American physical PlayStation 4 version include two Digimon exclusive to the Western release - making for a total of 11 DLC Digimon, in-game items, and costumes for Agumon, whist the digital Vita version included the same pre-order items with two PlayStation Vita themes. Seven new Digimon were added as free DLC on March 10.

The game's music was composed by Masafumi Takada, with sound design by Jun Fukuda. Purchasers of the Japanese version of the game received a code for a free digital download of 13 tracks from the game grouped together as the Digimon Story: Cyber Sleuth Bonus Original Soundtrack. An official commercial soundtrack containing 60 tracks from the game was released in Japan on March 29, 2015 by Sound Prestige Records.

Cyber Sleuth was removed from the US PSN store on both PS4 and PS Vita on December 20, 2018. It remained up in Europe and South East Asia however. It was delisted in Europe/South East Asia at the end of January 2019.

The Nintendo Switch and PC versions were developed by h.a.n.d.

Cyber Sleuth is considered to be a reboot of the Digimon Story series and was developed with player feedback in mind. Kazumasa Habu decided to stick to the base concepts of the Story series which has simple turn based battles with a levelling system, as that would allow players to be able to play without having to read instructions. As the focus of the Story series was to collect and train Digimon, it was felt that it was important to make sure Cyber Sleuth at least had the same amount of trainable Digimon as the original Digimon Story game, Digimon World DS. With Cyber Sleuth having 3D models instead of sprites this was tough, but they were able to achieve this goal thanks to the work of the developers, Media.Vision. Feedback they had received from players was that they wanted to be able to see their Digimon during battle, which the Nintendo DS games didn't do, which is why they decided to use 3D models for Cyber Sleuth. Due to the experience of creating models for Digimon Adventure (video game), Habu was certain they would be able to take that knowledge into making them for Cyber Sleuth as well. The attack and victory animations in Cyber Sleuth were very popular and highly admired, with their quality being because one of the development staff was a big Digimon fan so put a lot of effort into studying even minor Digimon. When Cyber Sleuth was in development, overseas distributors were not open to the idea of localising Digimon games because according to them, the games were aimed at children, and the anime wasn't popular, but they were eventually to localise Cyber Sleuth because of the petitions signed by fans for Digimon games to be localised again.

== Reception ==
Reception

Aggregate score
Aggregator	Score	
Aggregator	PS Vita	PS4
Metacritic	N/A	75/100

Review scores
Publication	Score	
Publication	PS Vita	PS4
Destructoid	N/A	7.5/10
Famitsu	34/40	35/40
GameRevolution	N/A	4/5
Hardcore Gamer	3.5/5	N/A
IGN	N/A	7.7/10
Polygon	N/A	7.5/10
PlayStation LifeStyle	N/A	7/10

The game holds a score of 75/100 on the review aggregator Metacritic, indicating generally favorable reviews. Digimon Story: Cyber Sleuth received a 34 out of 40 total score from Japanese magazine Weekly Famitsu, based on individual scores of 8, 9, 9, and 8.

Destructoid felt that the game wasn't much of a departure from older role-playing games, stating "The battle system is basically everything you've seen before from the past few decades of JRPGs," which includes random encounters that are "either deliciously or inexcusably old-school, depending on your tastes." While PlayStation LifeStyle felt that the game "isn't a perfect video game interpretation of Bandai Namco's long-running franchise," criticizing its linear dungeon design and "cheap" interface, its gameplay improvements were a step in the right direction "for fans who have been waiting to see the series get on Pokémon's level." The website also commended the colorful art and character design of Suzuhito Yasuda, declaring that "Yasuda's art brings crucial style and life to Digimon's game series, which had spent previous years sort of fighting to establish its identity." Hardcore Gamer thought that the game was an important step forward for the franchise, stating "It isn't perfect; its story and script could use some fine-tuning, and the world needs to be more interesting, but overall, this is a solid first step."

=== Sales ===
The PlayStation Vita version of Digimon Story: Cyber Sleuth sold 76,760 copies in its debut week in Japan, becoming the third high-selling title for the week. Although initial sales were less than its predecessor, Digimon World Re:Digitize, Cyber Sleuth managed to sell approximately 91.41% of all physical copies shipped to the region, and would go on to sell a total of 115,880 copies by the end of 2015, becoming the 58th best-selling software title that year. In the UK, Digimon Story: Cyber Sleuth was the 11th best selling game in the week of release. The PlayStation Vita version was the best selling digital title in North America and Europe. The game also has good performance among Latin American countries (#2 Brazil, #3 Mexico, #3 Argentina, #3 Chile, #3 Costa Rica, #4 Guatemala, #6 Perú, #9 Colombia) and the PlayStation 4 version was the 20th best selling digital title in North America and the 19th in Europe on the PlayStation Store in the month of its release in their respective categories. By May 2019, Cyber Sleuth had sold over 800,000 copies worldwide. By October 2020, Cyber Sleuth and Hacker's Memory had shipped more than 1.5 million units worldwide combined. The Switch port of Complete Edition sold 4,536 copies in its first week in Japan. By March 2025, they had sold a combined 2.5 million, and by May 2026, 3 million.
