= Vendémiaire no Tsubasa =

Japanese manga series

- First tankōbon volume cover

ヴァンデミエールの翼 (Vandemiēru no Tsubasa)
- Genre: Fantasy
- Manga
- Written by: Mohiro Kitoh
- Published by: Kodansha
- Imprint: Afternoon KC
- Magazine: Monthly Afternoon
- Original run: November 25, 1995 – November 25, 1997
- Volumes: 2
- icon

Vendémiaire no Tsubasa (Japanese: ヴァンデミエールの翼, Hepburn: Vandemiēru no Tsubasa; lit. 'The Wings of Vendémiaire') is a Japanese manga series written and illustrated by Mohiro Kitoh. It was serialized in Kodansha's seinen manga magazine Monthly Afternoon from November 1995 to November 1997, with its chapters collected in two tankōbon volumes.

== Plot ==
The story is broken up into eight differing sub-stories all involving a series of sentient mechanical puppets known as Vendémiaire (which is also the name of each). These stories all have a similar formula involving a Vendémiaire puppet encountering a boy or man that tries to help them with varying levels of success, usually trying to attain freedom for them. Overall these stories are somber and explore different contrasting opinions of human nature and how the Vendémiaire are treated by humans, often like slaves or worse. The Vendémiaire puppets have wings, and there is a strong flight motif throughout the various stories.

== Publication ==
Written and illustrated by Mohiro Kitoh, Vendémiaire no Tsubasa was irregularly serialized in Kodansha's seinen manga magazine Monthly Afternoon from November 25, 1995, (Note: Debuted in the magazine's January 1996 issue, released on November 25, 1995.) to November 25, 1997. (Note: Finished in the magazine's January 1998 issue, released on November 25, 1997.) Kodansha collected its eight chapters in two tankōbon volumes, released on April 23 and December 18, 1997. Kodansha republished the series in a single shinsoban volume on May 23, 2018.

=== Volumes ===
No.	Release date	ISBN
1	April 23, 1997	978-4-06-321069-9
1. Vandemiēru no Migite (ヴァンデミエールの右手); 2. Vandemiēru no Hakuyoku (ヴァンデミエールの白翼); 3. Terumidōru no Jikan (テルミドールの時間); 4. Furyukutidōru no Kasō (フリュクティドールの火葬)
Each chapter follows a different female sentient puppet who uses the name Vendémiaire. Chapter 1 The Vendémiaire in this chapter is a performer from a traveling circus who befriends a boy named Ray while in town. Ray attempts to free her from the circus master but fails and loses his right hand. When he wakes up, he discovers Vendémiaire's right hand in place of his own and resumes his daily life. Chapter 2 Will befriends a Vendémiaire and bets against her master in order to win her freedom. Her master sabotages Will's plane which hospitalizes him. Inspired by Will, Vendémiaire kills herself in order to be free from her master. Chapter 3 The Vendémiaire from Chapter 1 is befriended by a group of children. To pay for the medical treatment for one of the children, Vendémiaire sells herself to a local trader. Years later, the cured child cherishes her angel doll which was a memento from Vendémiaire. Chapter 4 This Vendémiaire attempts to kill her master in self defense and is saved by a man named Milton. Milton lives in a hut and awaits the day his governess returns to him. Vendémiaire helps him acknowledge his governess left forever in order to make Milton independent. Vendémiaire's master attempts to take her back but dies when his book is burned.
2	December 18, 1997	978-4-06-321078-1
5. Buryumēru no Itazura (ブリュメールの悪戯); 6. Vandemiēru no Kokuyoku (ヴァンデミエールの黒翼); 7. Vandemiēru no Kasō (ヴァンデミエールの火葬); 8. Vandemiēru no Kassō (ヴァンデミエールの滑走)
Each chapter follows a different female sentient puppet who uses the name Vendémiaire. Chapter 5 The chapter follows a girl named Brumaire and a Vendémiaire who was built in the former's likeness. Vendémiaire has a blank slate personality and is influenced by Brumaire. Influenced by Brumaire's envy and cruelty, Vendémiaire beats Brumaire to the point of brain damage and runs away. Chapter 6 This Vendémiaire is property to a rich master and takes place on a blimp. There, she befriends a boy named Avary who snuck onboard to warn her the blimp will crash. After a conflict between Avary and Vendémiaire's master, Avary jumps off the blimp and is saved by Vendémiaire. Chapter 7 This Vendémiaire is traveling through a blizzard with an orphaned baby. She is trapped with a man and persuades him to use her as firewood to keep the baby warm and to care for the baby in her place. Chapter 8 Years later, the Vendémiaire from Chapters 1 and 3 is awakened by Ray's secretary per his will. Vendémiaire visits Ray's body and inherits his memories to continue his life inside of her. She then burns the house down and travels the world with Ray's motorcycle. As the story ends, an airplane bearing the names of Avary and Vendémiaire from chapter 6 flies overhead.
