= Mohiro Kitoh =

Japanese manga artist

Mohiro Kitoh 鬼頭 莫宏
- Born: August 8, 1966 (age 60) Japan
- Areas: Manga artist, character designer
- Notable works: Shadow Star, Bokurano

Mohiro Kitoh (鬼頭 莫宏, Kitō Mohiro; born August 8, 1966) is a Japanese manga artist.

He created the manga Shadow Star and Bokurano, both of which were adapted into anime series.

== Biography ==
Kitoh's first manga Vendémiaire no Tsubasa debuted in Monthly Afternoon magazine in 1995. It consists of several short stories where mechanical puppet humanoids called Vendemaires meet and serve boys of various character and morals. Vendémiaire no Tsubasa ran until 1997 and was published by Kodansha in two tankōbon volumes. It was followed in 1999 by SiNNa 1905, a single-volume online manga detailing a civil war in an alternate-history Japan.

Kitoh's next major manga series was a science-fiction drama called Shadow Star, also known in Japan as Narutaru, about elementary and middle-schoolers who adopt alien starfish-like creatures. It ran in Monthly Afternoon from 1998 to 2003, and was adapted into an anime series in 2003. It was among the jury-selected works of Japan Media Arts Festival 2001.

Kitoh released his manga series Bokurano, about a group of children who participate in a real-life robot battle against alien invaders but whose victories cost their lives. It was serialized in Monthly Ikki magazine from 2003 to 2009 and published in 11 volumes. A one-shot spinoff, Bokurano Tokubetsu-hen was announced but not published in Monthly Ikki, but rather bundled with the eleventh tankōbon volume. It was adapted into an anime series, however the director Hiroyuki Morita made changes to the anime story with Kitoh's permission. In 2010, Bokurano won an Excellence Prize in the Manga Division at the 14th Japan Media Arts Festival Awards.

In 2011, he designed the Septentrion invader characters in the video game Devil Survivor 2, which was also made into an anime, albeit without Kitoh's involvement. Around the same time, Kitoh also served as a character designer for the animated film Evangelion: 2.0 You Can (Not) Advance, in which he was responsible for the design of the Third Angel.

From 2009 to 2015, Kitoh worked on the manga Noririn, serialized in Kodansha's Evening magazine, about a salaryman who loses his driver's license and takes up cycling along with a road racing high school girl. It ran for 11 volumes.

In 2015, Kitoh released Futago no Teikoku, a fantasy manga which takes place in a world resembling Japanese-occupied China during the 1930s and concerns a girl cursed to kill anyone who touches her. So far three volumes have been written, but as of 2025 the series is on hiatus. In 2017 Kitoh wrote Hayabusa-chan mo Tondemasu, a comedy manga, but this series ended after only three chapters.

In 2019 Kitoh underwent surgery to recover from spinal stenosis, and during his recovery took a hiatus from drawing manga. He wrote two other manga series during this time, those being Yorishiro Trunk and Ability Hero Correction, although he did not illustrate them. In 2021 Kitoh returned to writing and illustrating manga with the series No Boulder, a manga about bouldering, which ran until 2024.

== Works ==
Title	Year	Notes	Refs
Vendémiaire no Tsubasa	1995–1997	Serialized in Monthly Afternoon; 2 volumes published by Kodansha	
Shadow Star	1998–2003	Serialized in Monthly Afternoon; 12 volumes published by Kodansha	
Sinna 1905: Tumi-kor-ot A Record of a War (辰奈1905 -トミコローツ戦記-, Shinna Sen Kyū Hyaku Go Tomikorōtsu Senki)	1999	Webcomic; 1 volume published by Biblos	
Hallucination from the Womb (殻都市の夢, Kaku Toshi no Yume)	2003–2005	Serialized in Manga Erotics F 1 volume published by Ohta Books	
Bokurano	2003–2009	Serialized in Monthly Ikki; 11 volumes published by Shogakukan; 14th Media Arts Festival Award – Manga Division Excellence Prize	
The Gate to Space (空への門, Sora e no Mon)	2004	Short story published in Mystery Bonita; Based on a story by Shinichi Hoshi; Included in 1 volume published by Akita Shoten	
Kitō Mohiro Tanpenshū: Zansho (鬼頭莫宏短編集 残暑)	2004	Collection of works originally published in Weekly Shōnen Sunday, Weekly Shōnen Champion, Afternoon Season Zōkan, Monthly Afternoon, Young Magazine GT, Weekly Young Magazine and Monthly Ikki; 1 volume published by Shogakukan	
Mailus Exitus et Ortus (終わりと始まりのマイルス, Owari to Hajimari no Mairusu)	2006	Serialized in Manga Erotics F 1 volume published by Ohta Books	
Bokurano: Alternative (ぼくらの～alternative～, Bokurano Orutanatibu)	2007–2008	Light novel series (illustrations); 5 volumes published by Shogakukan	
Kare no Satsujin Keikaku (彼の殺人計画; lit. "His Murder Scheme")	2008	Short story published in Jump Square	
Kaze no Ō (風の王)	2009	Short story published in Jump Square	
Nanika Mochigatte Masuka (なにかもちがってますか)	2009–2015	Serialized in Good! Afternoon; 5 volumes published by Kodansha	
Noririn (のりりん)	2009–2015	Serialized in Evening; 11 volumes published by Kodansha	
Futago no Teikoku (双子の帝國)	2015–on hiatus	Serialized in Monthly Comic @Bunch; 3 volumes published by Shinchosha	
Hayabusa Chan mo Tondemasu (隼ちゃんもとんでます)	2017–on hiatus	Serialized in Evening	
Bass o Tsuru Nara (バスを釣るなら, Basu o Tsuru Nara)	2019	Short story published in Evening	
no-boulder (のボルダ, Noboruda)	2021–2024	Serialized on the Kurage Bunch website 4 volumes published by Shinchosha	

=== Anime ===
Title	Year	Notes	Refs
2013	Devil Survivor 2: The Animation	Septentriones characters design	

=== Video games ===
Title	Year	Notes	Refs
2011	Devil Survivor 2	Septentriones characters design	
