= Shin Megami Tensei: Devil Survivor 2 =

2011 video game

- Nintendo DS cover
- Developer: Atlus
- Publishers: JP: Atlus; NA: Atlus USA; EU: Ghostlight (DS); EU: NIS America (3DS)
- Director: Shinjirō Takata
- Producer: Shinjirō Takata
- Designer: Fūma Yatō
- Programmer: Tomohiko Matsuda
- Artists: Akiko Kotō; Suzuhito Yasuda; Mohiro Kitoh
- Writers: Shinji Yamamoto; Osamu Murata (Record Breaker)
- Composers: Kenji Ito; Atsushi Kitajoh; Toshiki Konishi; Ryota Kozuka; Kenichi Tsuchiya; Shoji Meguro (Record Breaker)
- Series: Megami Tensei
- Platforms: Nintendo DS; Nintendo 3DS
- Release: Nintendo DS: JP: July 28, 2011; NA: February 28, 2012; EU: October 18, 2013; Nintendo 3DS: JP: January 29, 2015; NA: May 5, 2015; EU: October 30, 2015
- Genre: Tactical role-playing
- Mode: Single-player

Shin Megami Tensei: Devil Survivor 2 (Note: Devil Survivor 2 (デビルサバイバー2, Debiru Sabaibā Tsū)) is a tactical role-playing game developed by Atlus for the Nintendo DS. It is a spin-off of the Megami Tensei series, and a standalone sequel to Shin Megami Tensei: Devil Survivor (2009). It was published by Atlus in Japan in 2011, North America in 2012, and in Europe by Ghostlight in 2013. The story follow a group in Tokyo after a series of natural disasters heralds the arrival of divine forces which threaten to destroy humanity in seven days. Gameplay is similar to the first Devil Survivor, combining grid-based combat with turn-based battle sequences, with a character relationship system unlocking new gameplay elements and different endings.

Devil Survivor 2 was developed over two years by many of the same staff as Devil Survivor, including producer and director Shinjirō Takata, and character designer Suzuhito Yasuda. The team's goal was to expand and refine their work from Devil Survivor. The music was co-composed by Kenji Ito and members of Atlus's sound team, while manga artist Mohiro Kitoh contributed enemy designs. Journalists praised the storyline and refined gameplay, while criticising the high difficulty and lack of new features. The game saw media expansions including a 2013 anime adaptation.

An expanded version subtitled Record Breaker was developed for the Nintendo 3DS and released worldwide in 2015: Atlus published the game in Japan and North America, while NIS America published it in Europe. Record Breaker was produced to both address fan criticism of the 3DS versions of Devil Survivor, and restore cut content. New music was composed by Shoji Meguro, and both Yasuda and Kitoh returned to create new character and enemy designs.

== Gameplay ==

Above, a battle map. Squads maneuver around and can attack enemy squads, ideally ones they have an advantage over. Below, an individual combat; a character and their monsters choose actions in turn-based combat. (2015 3DS Record Breaker version shown)

Shin Megami Tensei: Devil Survivor 2 is a tactical role-playing game in which players take on the role of a silent protagonist after a catastrophic event causes turmoil across Japan. Much of the gameplay is carried over from the game's predecessor Shin Megami Tensei: Devil Survivor (2009) and is split into two parts: story sequences which take up half an hour of in-game time, and combat in grid-based field areas. Combat begins when two units meet, transitioning to a first-person turn-based combat where two parties of three get a single round of combat to act: actions include standard attacks, offensive and support skills. Hitting an enemy's weakness rewarding an extra round to the character who landed the attack.

The protagonist and player characters use demons as allies: demons can either be bought at the Demon Auction, or two demons can be used to create a new demon which can be further enhanced using items as part of the fusion. During combat, the party can use Skill Crack to learn abilities from enemies provided the party assigned that skill defeats the marked enemy.

A new feature is the Fate system, in which talking with party members will improve their relationship with the protagonist and raise Fate rank, starting at 0 and capping at 5. Raising the Fate rank allows access to new skill exchange options, combat abilities, and new demon fusion options. Some characters can die permanently in battle, removing them from the story, and the choices made during the story and who the protagonist interacts with leads into one of the multiple endings.

== Synopsis ==
=== Setting and characters ===
Devil Survivor 2 takes place across multiple cities in contemporary Japan, including Tokyo, Nagoya and Osaka: the premise is that a series of disasters strikes the country, causing devastation and heralding the arrival of supernatural forces which threaten to wipe out the world within seven days. Shortly before the game's events, a website dubbed Nicaea becomes popular, showing the deaths of people close to the user. Nicaea also includes a portal to the Demon Summoning App, allowing someone to control and attack with demons after making a contract.

The silent protagonist is a high school student who ends up caught up in the game's events and gaining access to the Demon Summoning App alongside many others. His three immediate allies are childhood friend Daichi Shijima, classmate Io Nitta, and the airheaded Yuzuru "Joe" Akie. They end up being recruited into JP's, an organization which protects Japan from supernatural threats. Key characters within JP's are its leader Yamato Hotsuin, his second-in-command Makoto Sako, Osaka-based doctor Otome Yanagiya, and lead scientist Fumi Kanno. Other survivors who end up allying with JP's are the dancer Hinako Kujou, young boxer Keita Wakui, former pianist Airi Ban, and chef Jungo Torii. JP's is opposed by a faction led by detective Ronaldo Kuriki, and the protagonist is often accosted by a figure dubbed the Anguished One. The expanded release Record Breaker adds Miyako Hotsuin, a woman who takes Yamato's place as the leader of JP's.

=== Plot ===
After downloading a death prediction app dubbed Nicaea onto their phones, the protagonist, Daichi and Io are nearly killed in a predicted train crash, then must fight past demons who can be recruited using Nicaea. A series of natural disasters has struck Earth, and soon after a being not recognised as a demon begins killing Tokyo's residents. The group are taken in by JP's, with Yamato seeking their aid in fighting the non-demonic beings: they are eventually revealed as the Septentriones, celestial beings from outside reality. The protagonist meets other summoners, including a group opposing JP's led by Ronaldo Kuriki, saving them from their predicted deaths. The protagonist is also regularly contacted by the Anguished One, who is observing events and gave humanity a fighting chance by distributing the Nicaea app. As the Septentriones destroy magical barriers protecting Japan from the Void, an expanse that is swallowing the planet, Yamato reveals the Septentriones were sent to test humanity by Polaris, their leader and current Administrator of Earth.

After defeating the sixth Septentrione, the party splinters into different factions who want to restore the world in different ways: Yamato seeks a meritocracy, Ronaldo seeks an egalitarian society, and Daichi hopes for a resolution the entire group can agree on and can eventually be convinced to either assassinate Polaris and survive in the ruined world or restore the old world as it was. The protagonist can side with any of these factions, or with the Anguished One who reveals defeating Polaris can allow him to become Administrator and create a new world for humanity. The winning party opens a path to the Akashic Record, the Administrator's realm overseeing Earth. In routes where the protagonist does not side with him, they must fight the Anguished One−revealed to be Alcor, the eighth Septentrione. In other routes, Ronaldo and Yamato die rather than join. In the Akashic Record, the party fight Polaris, either winning their wish by showing their strength or killing her to fulfill their desired plan. In each ending, a final message is received through Nicaea.

In the "Triangulum Arc", which follows a scenario where the entire party decided to rewind history and restore the world with Alcor's aid, the protagonist gradually reunites with his initially-amnesiac companions after a new force dubbed the Triangulum begin attacking humanity. They find Yamato has vanished, replaced with Miyako, who insists on both preventing the party from getting into danger and captures rather than destroys the Triangulum. They also suffer from visions of being killed by the Triangulum's leader Arcturus. During the campaign, the current world is revealed to be the third: after the initial rewind, the Akashic Record's controller Canopus destroyed the protagonist while attacking Alcor for his unauthorized actions, then created the Triangulum who killed everyone but Alcor and Yamato before their defeat. Since the second rewind, Yamato has been in the Akashic Record preserving the protagonist's data from the Triangulum's attacks, while Alcor was captured by Miyako.

The party rescue Yamato from the Akashic Record and defeat the final Triangulum and confronting Miyako−she is revealed as Cor Caroli, an agent of Canopus who inherited Yamato's role in history. Miyako wants to sacrifice the party, who share the administrative authority to use the Akashic Record, and herself to turn Alcor into a new Administrator and prevent further actions from Canopus and other Administrators, who see humanity as a threat. If the protagonist refuses Miyako's plan, he persuades her to join their side after fighting her. While Canopus is supposedly invulnerable, an error created by Yamato and Miyako existing at the same time exposes a weakness that can be used to destroy it. Depending on character relationships, three endings can be chosen. Ronaldo seeks to continually roll back history and defeat each Administrator when they attack; Alcor suggests turning the protagonist into a new permanent Administrator; and Yamato proposes using the wishes of all humanity to create a new world freed from the Akashic Record. In Yamato's route, depending on the strength of the protagonist's relationships with them, Alcor and Miyako are reborn in the new world as humans.

== Development ==
Development of Devil Survivor 2 began at series developer Atlus after the original Devil Survivor released in 2008. Shinjirō Takata returned as director and producer, and Fūma Yatō as art director. Tanaka described their aim as creating a "culmination" of the Devil Survivor series and the final "masterpiece" for the Nintendo DS. The team decided to focus on improving the original game's elements, while expanding the scale of its story to cover multiple cities across Japan: locations were chosen based on how good they would look from the game's angled top-down view. The basic gameplay was not changed much, although more demons and social elements were added. The death videos showing characters' fates was a direct evolution of the Fate system in Growlanser: Wayfarer of Time.

The scenario was written by Shinji Yamamoto. Takada insisted that the game's story be unrelated to the original Devil Survivor so new players could enjoy it, even refusing requests to include older characters as cameos. He also described the scenario's size, along with keeping character emotions relatively consistent between interactions. Another difficulty was guiding players through the story, as none of the characters around the protagonist had the same driven nature as Atsuno from the original game.

Suzuhito Yasuda returned to design the game's characters. Comparing his work on the two Devil Survivor titles, Yasuda said he had become more aware of art limitations within the game. The characters' outfits were designed based on their backstories and zodiac sign, the latter an element that was cut from the final game. The Septentrione enemies were designed by manga artist Mohiro Kitoh. Kitoh was given instructions to make them look "lively" on the DS, so he designed forms that were easy to understand. He was given minimal story information to work with, and created a few rough drafts to send into Atlus before getting the go-ahead. His guideline for their appearances was inorganic divine messengers. Kitoh was asked to design the Septentriones without referencing the established series designs of Kazuma Kaneko, which gave him a lot of creative freedom. Some of the Septentrione designs were difficult to design, as they needed to work in both 2D sprite renders and the 3D sequences.

=== Music ===
The music of Devil Survivor 2 was primarily composed by Kenji Ito, known for his work on the SaGa and Mana series. Additional tracks were composed by Atlus Sound Team members Atsushi Kitajoh, Toshiki Konishi, Ryota Kozuka and Kenichi Tsuchiya. Takada felt that the sound team needed to "modernize" their sound in combination with Ito's style. Ito had not previously composed for a "dark worldview" like Devil Survivor, describing his score as a dark image with hope still visible. Due to the modern day setting, Ito did not use an orchestral sound, working with Atlus to fine tune the themes and using a lot of modern instruments to create a soundtrack comparable to a "hard-boiled thriller". While he wrote the opening battle theme to strongly reflect his personal style, other tracks were more inspired by the story, with the exploration track deliberately written to have a "neutral" sound. The opening theme composed by Ito and arranged by Tsuchiya, "Illusion World", was sung by Kuniko Saga with lyrics by Teppei Kobayashi.

A soundtrack album was released by Frontier Works on August 24, 2011. As an early promotion for the game, an arrange album titled Kenji Ito ☆ Atlus Sound Team Special Soundtrack was created by Atlus. The album featured tracks by Ito in new arrangements by Kitajoh, Konishi, Kozuka and Tsuchiya.

== Release ==
Devil Survivor 2 was announced in March 2011. During the last stages of development, the 2011 Tōhoku earthquake and tsunami caused some within Atlus to consider either adjusting the game's content to be less similar to real-world destruction, or cancel it outright. Ultimately the team released the game unchanged, but alter how it was presented in promotion and advertisements by focusing on the characters over destroyed cities. It released in Japan on July 28, 2011. A North American release was confirmed by Atlus USA in June 2011, releasing in the region on February 28, 2012.

Ghostlight announced in April 2012 that they would release the game in Europe, although it did not receive a release date for some time due to the state of the DS game market at the time. Ghostlight later stated in March 2013 that while the European version was finished and approved by Nintendo, a standard retail release was impossible due to the DS being phased out. In response they needed a minimum of 1,800 pre-orders to justify retail manufacturing, which they achieved by September. It released in Europe on October 18.

=== Media adaptations ===
Following the game's popularity, Devil Survivor 2 -Show Your Free Will- was given a manga adaptation: the manga follows the game's events from Io's perspective. It is written by Nagako Sakaki, and was serialized in Earth Star Entertainment's magazine Comic Earth Star. It was released in two book volumes between May and December 2012. The characters and setting were featured in a social card game titled Devil Survivor 2: The Extra World which ran from 2013 to 2014. and used as the theme for a pachinko slot game created by Olympia titled Devil Survivor 2: The Last Seven Days released in 2015.

An anime television series based on the game aired on MBS between April 5, 2013 and June 28, 2013 and was simulcast by Crunchyroll. It was produced by Studio Bridge and directed by Seiji Kishi who also directed the anime adaptation of Persona 4. A manga based on the anime began serialization in Square Enix's Monthly GFantasy publication, beginning in January 2013 and collected into six volumes released between March 2013 and December 2014. The manga was written by Makoto Uezu and illustrated by Haruto Shioda. A light novel focused on Yamato Hotsuin was released in 2013, written by Katsumi Shinzawa and published under the Kodansha Box label.

=== Record Breaker ===
An expanded version of the game, Shin Megami Tensei: Devil Survivor 2: Record Breaker, (Note: Devil Survivor 2: Break Record (デビルサバイバー2 ブレイクレコード, Debiru Sabaibā Tsū: Bureiku Rekōdo)) was announced for the Nintendo 3DS in March 2013, featuring a new storyline, mechanical improvements, and full voice acting. Production began in 2011 in parallel with the anime adaptation, originally intended to launch during its broadcast. Record Breaker was co-developed with Tam Tam, and the scenario was written by Osamu Murata of Elephante. Yasuda returned to design Miyako Hotsuin, while Kitoh designed the Triangulum, Cor Coroli and Canopus. Yasuda also created the game's cover art. The anime's Japanese voice cast reprised their roles for Record Breaker. The opening was directed by Kou Yoshinari, and animated by Bridge. Yatō described their initial request to the anime's producer was to "make something like Akira", and the producer brought on Yoshinari as a result.

Takada cited the Triangulum Arc's inspiration as considering the original game's endings in the wake of the 2011 earthquake, thinking none of them offered all the characters a happy ending. Due to this wish for all the characters to have a chance at happiness, the Triangulum Arc follows a premise not possible in the main game, with the new scenario's harsh events reflecting this choice which defied the original game's logic. One of the problems with the scenario was writing the characters so they would have further and fresh development after their experiences in the Septentrione Arc. Miyako was a character created for the original game that was cut due early on to difficulties fitting her into the scenario, so Tanaka asked for her to be incorporated into the new storyline.

Seven new music tracks were created by recurring series composer Shoji Meguro. The new opening theme "Rotating World" was performed by Hiroshi Kamiya, who voiced the protagonist in the anime, with lyrics written by Shigeo Komori. A two-disc soundtrack album was released on July 22, 2015. The first disc included Meguro's tracks, while the second was a reissue of the original soundtrack. A limited album of arranged tracks was released alongside the game. The album was reissued digitally worldwide on January 15, 2024.

Originally scheduled for release in July 2013, the game was delayed due to quality concerns. The game eventually released in Japan on January 29, 2015. The game was supported with downloadable content covering both maps allowing players to easily gain money and experience points, and guest characters from the Durarara!! as free downloads. Atlus released the game in North America on May 5. The game was released in Europe by NIS America on October 30. The map DLC was released alongside both the North American and European versions.

== Reception ==
Reception

Aggregate scores
Aggregator	Score
Metacritic	79/100 (DS); 84/100 (3DS)
OpenCritic	90% recommend

Review scores
Publication	Score
1Up.com	A−
Destructoid	8.5/10
Famitsu	8/10, 9/10, 8/10, 8/10 (3DS)
GameSpot	8.5/10
RPGamer	3.5/5
RPGFan	89%

The game was generally well-received, garnering an aggregate score of 79/100 on Metacritic, based on twenty-one reviews. Although the depth and quality of the battle system and story were praised, the game was criticized for being unfairly difficult at times. Heidi Kemps from GameSpot praised the consequences of the player's actions and commented that "Devil Survivor 2 is a great game. Combat is strategy-laden and engaging; amassing and preparing your demon companions is loads of fun; and the story is filled with memorable characters and set pieces that keep your eyes glued to the dual screens." RPGamer's Mike Moehnke the stated that "Devil Survivor 2 remains an addictive experience for a large chunk of its length."

The Fate System was well received for helping in the characterizing the cast members by RPGamer although RPGFan found it often "almost devolves into a quasi-dating-sim" due to the choices the player has to make in order to increase the points. Dale North from Destructoid noted how the Fate System appeared to be influenced by the latest Shin Megami Tensei: Persona games and praised it for its effect on the story and gameplay. The final part of the game was criticized for the increased difficulty.

The game was often compared with its predecessor, Shin Megami Tensei: Devil Survivor. Despite noting multiple similarities between Devil Survivor 2 and its predecessor, Jeremy Parish from 1UP.com noted that "Perhaps the most pleasant surprise about Devil Survivor 2 is that it doesn't feel like a massive backward step despite its predecessor's having been ported to 3DS." Dale North noticed several improvements in the game claiming "I'm pleased to report that Devil Survivor 2 is more of the same, this time bringing an even better story, better characters, more demons to collect and a bunch of gameplay improvements." Bob Richardson from RPGFan criticized there was "nothing new" despite citing "Tremendous variety, lots of dialogue choices and paths, challenging gameplay."

Devil Survivor 2 sold 63,000 copies during its first week of release. By the end of the year it had sold 99,748 units in Japan. In October 2011, Atlus announced that the game reached a total of 106,000 units sold in Japan. Devil Survivor 2: Record Breaker sold 53,264 copies in its first week of release in Japan. Record Breaker sold a total of 75,291 physical copies and 1,213 digital copies for a combined 76,504 Record Breaker sales and a total of 182,504 units sold across all versions in Japan.
