= Shin Megami Tensei: Devil Survivor =

2009 video game

- Nintendo DS North American cover art
- Developer: Atlus
- Publishers: JP/NA: Atlus; EU: Ghostlight
- Director: Shinjiro Takada
- Producer: Shinjiro Takada
- Designer: Fūma Yatō
- Programmer: Tomohiko Matsuda
- Artists: Akiko Kotō; Suzuhito Yasuda; Kazuma Kaneko
- Writer: Yoh Haduki
- Composers: Takami Asano; Kenichi Tsuchiya; Atsushi Kitajoh
- Series: Megami Tensei
- Platforms: Nintendo DS; Nintendo 3DS
- Release: Nintendo DS: JP: January 15, 2009; NA: June 23, 2009; Nintendo 3DS: NA: August 23, 2011; JP: September 1, 2011; EU: March 29, 2013
- Genre: Tactical role-playing
- Mode: Single-player

Shin Megami Tensei: Devil Survivor (Note: Known in Japan as Megami Ibunroku: Devil Survivor (Japanese: 女神異聞録:デビルサバイバー, Hepburn: Megami Ibunroku: Debiru Sabaibā; lit. Alternate Tales of the Goddess: Devil Survivor)) is a 2009 tactical role-playing game developed and published by Atlus for the Nintendo DS. It is a spin-off within the wider Megami Tensei series. An expanded version subtitled Overclocked was released on the Nintendo 3DS in Japan and North America by Atlus in 2011, and in Europe by Ghostlight in 2013. Following a group of teenagers in Tokyo who are trapped inside a government lockdown following an invasion of demons, the gameplay is divided between story events tied to an in-game clock, and tactical grid-based combat with a turn-based battle system. Which events and battles are completed can unlock different endings.

Devil Survivor was developed by veterans of the Growlanser series, with the goal being to expand the Megami Tensei series to a wider audience. Its gameplay was reworked to appeal to newcomers, and the character were designed by light novel artist Suzuhito Yasuda. The storyline, which was inspired by Biblical texts, caused problems due to its size and structure. The music was primarily composed by Takami Asano of Japanese rock band Godiego. Sales exceeded Atlus's expectations, and the game was praised for its storyline and gameplay design, though its graphics drew mixed reactions. Overclocked was also praised, but critics noted a lack of new features. The game was adapted into multiple other media including a manga. A sequel, Shin Megami Tensei: Devil Survivor 2, was released in 2011.

== Gameplay ==
A fight in Devil Survivor showing the enemies' stats in the top, and all the fighters in the bottom

Shin Megami Tensei: Devil Survivor is a tactical role-playing game in which players take on the role of a silent protagonist after they are trapped in a lockdown within Tokyo. The game takes place across seven days, and is divided into two modes: location visits and story sequences which take up half an hour of the in-game timer, and combat encounters either tied to the story or within a free battle arena. All characters are portrayed using sprite-based graphics on the field and static character portraits during dialogue. Some story events take place at the same time, with choosing one removing the other. The player can also skip time to the next main story battle.

Combat is divided into two halves: the combat arena viewed from a top-down perspective on a grid, and battles between parties which are portrayed in first person: combat information is split between the Nintendo DS's two screens. The player controls up to four units made up of a human character and two assigned demons, who are positioned before the start of battle and can move, perform special out-of-battle skills, and engage in combat once per turn. Each action has a Turn Cost, which impacts the character's placement in the battle's turn order timeline.

In combat, the game switches to a first-person view for a turn-based battle: each side is given one round of turns: actions include standard physical attacks, skills which cost health (HP) or magic (MP) to cast and can either deal damage, heal or alter statistics, or using items. The player can select an auto-battle option, or control the battle manually. Both player and enemy parties consist of a leader and two other fighters, with the leader's defeat automatically winning the battle. Landing critical hits or exploiting weaknesses grants an extra combat round. The game ends if a predetermined battle condition is failed, or all characters are defeated.

Combat rewards the in-game currency Macca and experience points to all party members, with actions such as eliminating all members of an enemy team and how much damage was taken impacting the reward. Upon leveling up, the protagonist is allocated skill points which can be allocated by the player to adjust their statistics, with other characters and demons having pre-determined statistical gains. Human characters gain new active and passive skills from enemies using Skill Crack, where they target a skill from a specified unit, then must defeat that unit with the assigned squad. Once cracked, the player can assign these skills across all human characters.

The party's first demons are recruited during the prologue battle after defeating them. Demons level up alongside the human characters, and can be taugnt new skills using magnatite earned from battles. The two ways of gaining new demons are the Demon Auction House, and Demon Fusion. At the Auction House, the player bids against AI-controlled characters for demons using macca, either outbidding other parties or buying the demon outright. Demon Fusion is done through the Cathedral of Shadows, where two demons can be fused to create a new demon: the demon can either be in the party roster or summoned from the Demon Compendium for a price. As part of the Fusion, the player can choose skills the new demon will inherit from its parent demons.

The game's overall story is non-linear, and choices made earlier in the game can affect which characters and battles are available in later sections and which ending the player unlocks. There is a New Game Plus unlockable upon completing the game, with its implementation being different depending on the version of Devil Survivor: the original release automatically carries over some elements into a new campaign, while the expanded Overclocked release has players use points awarded by completing tasks during the playthrough to select their bonuses.

== Synopsis ==
=== Setting and characters ===
Devil Survivor is set in modern day Tokyo within the Yamanote Line. Due to the game's events, which see an outbreak of demons, the Japanese government and Self-Defense Forces place the area within the Yamanote Line into lockdown under the pretence of a major gas leak, cutting off electricity and basic services. The situation worsens when people use a program in their COMPs, small portable gaming devices, to make contracts with demons and use them to fight both other demons and humans within the lockdown area. When the demons appear, everyone gets a "Death Clock", a unusually-invisible timer counting down seven days when everyone within the Yamanote Line will die.

The game's silent protagonist is a high school student who receives exclusive warning messages from his COMP's Laplace Mail service, and can see the Death Clock counters. The protagonist is joined by his high school friends, Atsuro Kihara and Yuzu Tanikawa. During the seven days they meet and can team up with a number of other characters including Atsuno's timid school friend Keisuke Takagi, cosplay idol Midori Komaki, gang leader Tadashi "Kaido" Nikaido, pop singer Yoshino "Haru" Haruzawa, bar owner Eiji "Gin" Kamiya, elementary school teacher Mari Mochizuki, and Self-Defense Forces soldier Misaki Izuna. Key characters are Naoya, the protagonist's cousin and a programmer who created the COMP's demon summoning functions; and Amane Kuzuryu of the Shomonkai religious cult.

=== Plot ===
One day, the protagonist and his friends Atsuro and Yuzu are given modified electronic devices called COMPs by the protagonist's cousin Naoya. Shortly afterwards, a demon outbreak occurs, prompting the lockdown of Tokyo and trapping many including the three within the Yamanote Line. In the aftermath, vigilante groups emerge, the COMPs are shown able to recruit friendly demons to fight enemies, and the protagonist becomes able to see counters over people's heads indicating when they will die. Using this skill the protagonist can change the fate of multiple characters including Haru and Keisuke. Early on the three learn from Keisuke that everyone within the quarantine will die within seven days. After defeating the powerful demon Beldr, the protagonist is recruited into the War of Bel, an effort by humans including the Shomonkai cult and their priestess Amane to gain access to the mystical Throne of Bel.

The lockdown is revealed to have been triggered by a planned battle between factions, with the aim of judging humanity's worth. If the demons remain in Tokyo by the seventh day, the angels will destroy humanity, while the Japanese government knew of the event and has put in contingency plans to destroy Tokyo before the apocalypse can be triggered. Naoya and the protagonist meet on the fifth day, when Naoya reveals he and the Shomonkai created the COMPs to trigger demon summonings and trigger the lockdown, with Naoya seeking to have the protagonist ascend the Throne of Bel. Depending on the route, Naoya and the protagonist are revealed to be incarnations of Cain and Abel, with Naoya seeking vengeance for Cain's downfall. Amane seeks to create a peaceful world under angelic rule, Yuzu wants to escape the lockdown, Atsuro wants to take control of the demons in humanity's name, while Gin wants to banish the demons and return Tokyo to normal.

Depending on the choices made during the seven days, and the characters the protagonist saves, different endings are unlocked on the seventh day. An early ending is unlocked by following civilian demon tamers through a break in the quarantine, failing the trial and costing humanity its free will. A second similar ending on the seventh day has Yuzu convince the protagonist to break through the quarantine by force, allowing demons to escape and trigger the apocalypse. If the protagonist chooses to approach the Throne of Bel, the demon invasion is stopped in multiple ways: the protagonist can side with Amane and the angels as a representative of God; with Naoya as the Demon Overlord to declare war on Heaven; with Atsuro to reprogram the COMPs and enslave demons in service of a third technological revolution; or with Gin and Haru to permanently banish demons from the human realm while still passing the trial.

The "8th Day" scenario of Overclocked depicts new events following Yuzu's, Naoya's and Amane's endings. In Yuzu's path, following their escape and being branded as terrorists by the government, the party returns to the lockdown and defeats Belberith, patron of the Shomonkai: depending on the completion of a side quest, demons either continue to invade or are barred from the world. In Naoya's route, the protagonist's party must fight the angel Metatron, who is prolonging the lockdown to hunt the new Demon Overlord: the protagonist's actions of either killing or sparing Metatron's agents influence how he rules Earth after defeating Metatron. In Amane's route, the protagonist's efforts to further God's rule are resisted by Japan's creator deity Okuninushi, who demands that the protagonist guide Naoya to salvation: the protagonist succeeds and Naoya helps defeat Okuninushi.

== Development ==
The game takes place in modern Tokyo after it is put in quarantine.

Devil Survivor was produced by Megami Tensei developer Atlus. Multiple staff were veterans of the Growlanser series, including director and producer Shinjiro Takada, scenario writer Yoh Haduki, and art director Akiko Kotō. Media.Vision assisted in creating the background and environmental art. The characters were designed by Suzuhito Yasuda, known for his illustration work on light novels including Durarara!!. Series artist Kazuma Kaneko returned to design new demons.

The aim was to create a beginner-friendly tactical game, with a new style in story and art design compared to other Megami Tensei titles. The DS was chosen due to its large casual gamer audience and dual screen system. The time management element was carried over from the Growlanser series. The demon auctions, and pace of both story and free battles were designed to give players both an easier tactical experience and easy access to demon fusion. Balancing the demons to be fair while maintaining the tactical elements proved difficult. According to Kotō, the team were continuously pushing against the DS's vRAM limitations.

Devil Survivor was announced in October 2008. It was released on January 15, 2009. The Japanese release used the title Megami Ibunroku, previously used for Revelations: Persona; the title was intended to denote it as a spin-off with direct ties to the main series. The game was localized by Atlus USA, with veteran staff Nich Maragos and Scott Strichart taking part. In contrast with earlier Megami Tensei titles which were given high age ratings, the ESRB gave the game a "Teen" rating. It released in the region on June 23.

=== Scenario and art design ===
When writing the story, Haduki approached it like a light novel, alongside wanting to preserve the series' established dark tone. The death clock was one of several elements intended to add suspense to the story. The theme of the game was "survival", inspired by the enclosed setting, and the team researched actual disaster protocol in Japan and survival techniques people were advised to use in a natural disaster. An aspect of the scenario was there being no "correct" choice for players, with no examples of black and white moral alignments. During early development, the narrative was a lot more straightforward with simple choices and the protagonist barely appeared on-screen, but the team changed it so the protagonist had a greater personal presence and more realistic dialogue options. Atsuno's character was intended as a guiding force for the player. The final scenario was much larger than initially planned, with the team's programmer having to expand the game's ROM capacity twice. The main story also went through multiple revisions, with the pre-lockdown messages alone being rewritten six times for clarity and pacing. The seven day time limit, a reference to both the creation myth in the Book of Genesis and elements of the Book of Revelation, proved troublesome for the team as they needed to keep the scenarios consistent while allowing for different paths and choice variations. Haduki remembered the staff member in charge of arranging and testing scenario paths being "in tears" from the work load. Late in development, a bug that blocked off Amane's path necessitated a complete recheck and some scenes had to be removed.

Yasuda, a fan of the series, readily agreed to work on the Devil Survivor characters. The design direction he was given was "modern", with Kotō gathering research material for Yasuda so the characters would appear fashionable. Yasuda was told that due to hardware limitations, each main character could only have three distinct body poses with around ten facial expressions, so he made the body poses as expressive as possible and gave the team detailed notes on which faces to match to a pose. One proposed character, a "celebrity" journalist dubbed Mai who would show the public reaction to the lockdown, had to be cut due to difficulties fitting her into the story. With one exception of a large temple, the game's real world locations were drawn from across Tokyo. Different members of staff including Haduki and Kotō went on journeys to ensure their correlation to each other within the area chosen for the game's events. The sprite designs were intended to be realistically expressive, with the team looking to the sprite artwork of Revelations: Persona as a reference. The COMPs were originally going to be modified mobile phones, but this was scrapped to maintain the premise of complete communication cut-off. Kotō elaborated that Nintendo wanted them modelled on the DS, which the team only just managed to accomplish before the production deadline.

=== Devil Survivor: Overclocked ===
An enhanced version of the game, Shin Megami Tensei: Devil Survivor Overclocked, (Note: Devil Survivor Over Clock (デビルサバイバー オーバークロック, Debiru Sabaibā Obākurokku)) was developed by Atlus for the Nintendo 3DS. In addition to updated graphics and voice acting, Overclocked includes new demons, a rebalanced easy difficulty setting, and a new scenario dubbed "The 8th Day" which follows from certain endings. Overclocked was released first in North America by Atlus on August 23, 2011. It released in Japan by Atlus on September 1. Overclocked was released in Europe by Ghostlight on March 29, 2013. The European release launched with bugs including game freezing and crashes related to demon summoning and the demon auction house. Ghostlight worked with Atlus and Nintendo to create a patch to address the issues, releasing it in May.

Takada returned as director, Haduki as scenario writer, and Kotō as art director. Yasuda returned to design the new cover art. While Overclocked did not use 3D graphics, the graphics and art assets were upgraded with higher detail, with Kaneko redrawing his new demon artwork. Takada's wish for the port was to both include additional elements and improvements based on feedback, and make the game available to a wider audience. The game featured 20,000 lines of voiced dialogue: 15,000 in the original story, and 5,000 in the "8th Day" scenarios. Takada called this the largest amount of voice acting in an Atlus game to date, and some staff were concerned that it would not fit onto the cartridge ROM. Due to his large role in the narrative, Atsuro had the largest amount of dedicated voice acting.

=== Music ===
The music was primarily composed by Takami Asano of Japanese rock band Godiego, with additional tracks by Atlus composers Kenichi Tsuchiya and Atsushi Kitajoh. Asano had to adjust his music for the limited sound capacities of the DS. The opening vocal theme "Reset" was sung by Aya Ishihara, with lyrics by Hirth. A soundtrack album for the game, Megami Ibunroku: Devil Survivor Original Remix Soundtrack, was published by Lantis with the music produced by Asano. For this release, Asano re-recorded the tracks with new guitar performances and instrumentation.

Asano returned to compose two new tracks for the Overclocked "8th Day" scenario. A new opening theme "Soul Survive", sung by Haru's voice actress Junko Minagawa, was composed by Ryota Kozuka as a counterpart to Asano's original theme. Teppei Kobayashi wrote the lyrics, while Toshiki Konishi performed the guitar part. A soundtrack album was released on November 25, 2011. The album was reissued digitally worldwide on January 15, 2024, with this release including "Reset".

== Reception ==
Reception

Aggregate score
Aggregator	Score	
Aggregator	3DS	DS
Metacritic	78/100	84/100

Review scores
Publication	Score	
Publication	3DS	DS
1Up.com	N/A	A−
Famitsu	8/10, 8/10, 8/10, 8/10	8/10, 9/10, 8/10, 8/10
Game Informer	N/A	8/10
GameSpot	N/A	9/10
GamesRadar+	4.5/5	N/A
IGN	7.5/10	8.7/10
Nintendo Life	8/10	N/A
Official Nintendo Magazine	87%	N/A
RPGamer	4/5	4/5

During its first week in Japan, Devil Survivor sold over 55,000 units and ranking as the third best-selling game of that week. In a financial report in October 2009, Atlus revealed sales totals for Japan and North America. The Japanese release had sold over 110,000 units against expectations of 100,000, while in North America it sold over 40,000 units against expectations of 25,000. Overclocked had first-week sales of over 21,000 units in Japan, and by the end of the year had reached over 39,000 units in the region.

The original Devil Survivor garnered a score of 84 out of 100 from review aggregate website Metacritic, indicating generally positive reviews. In its review, Japanese magazine Famitsu noted the slower and more strategic approach to the series combat elements as an enjoyable change, with one reviewer calling combat "difficult but exquisitely balanced". Jeremy Parish, writing for 1Up.com, praised the game's new spin on the established Megami Tensei combat system which also noting its high difficulty. GameSpot's Lark Anderson gave much praise to the combat design, story, and amount of story choices and customization. His main complaint was that the clear marking of storyline missions made other events and locations "completely useless". Joe Juba, writing for Game Informer, enjoyed the combat and how the story pulled him along, but faulted the chance element of combat encounters and low graphical quality. Mark Bozen of IGN enjoyed the story and praised the blending of tactical RPG elements with established Megami Tensei mechanics, additionally giving praise to the art design despite a lack of variety and faulted the soundtrack's repetitive nature. Michael Cunningham of RPGamer again praised the story and overall gameplay design, but felt a lack of variety in the artwork and music.

Devil Survivor Overclocked held a score of 78 out of 100 on Metacritic, a lower but still positive score. Famitsu praised the additions and changes made to Overclocked, with one reviewer praising the 8th Day scenario as an addition that "really powers up the plot." GamesRadar's Henry Gilbert enjoyed the gameplay overall and liked the new story elements, but called it overly difficult in some areas and negatively mentioned the lack of 3D graphical elements. Cassandra Ramos of RPGamer enjoyed the combat and storyline, and praised the additions to the soundtrack, but faulted the updated New Game+ mechanic compared to the original. IGN's Audrey Drake still praised the game as well-designed and challenging with an enjoyable story, but faulted the lack of gameplay additions and graphical updates. Patrick Elliot of Nintendo Life praised the addition of the 8th Day scenario and voice acting, but felt players of the original would not be impressed due to the lack of graphical and gameplay updates. Official Nintendo Magazine's Joe Skrebels disliked the "dated" visuals and lack of variety in the soundtrack, but was otherwise positive about its storyline and challenging gameplay design.

== Legacy ==
A standalone sequel to Devil Survivor, Shin Megami Tensei: Devil Survivor 2 began in 2009 and last two years. Returning team members included Tanaka, Kotō, and Yasuda. The game was released in 2011 in Japan, 2012 in North America, and 2013 in Europe. An expanded version for the 3DS, subtitled Record Breaker, was released worldwide in 2015.

A drama CD based on the game was published by Frontier Works in August 2009. Two light novel anthologies were published by Harvest Publishing in August and September 2009, featuring stories contributed by Norimitsu Kaihō, Narumi Takadaira, Osamu Murata and Nanamon. A manga adaptation written and illustrated by Satoru Matsuba and released in Kodansha's Monthly Shōnen Sirius magazine. The manga ran from May 2012 to February 2016. It was released in eight volumes between April 2013 and April 2016 by Kodansha. Kodansha released the manga in North America, releasing its eight volumes between September 2015 and November 2016.
