= Suzuhito Yasuda =

Japanese manga artist and illustrator

Suzuhito Yasuda ヤスダ スズヒト
- Born: Mie, Japan
- Areas: Manga artist, illustrator
- Notable works: Durarara!! Yozakura Quartet; Is It Wrong to Try to Pick Up Girls in a Dungeon?

Suzuhito Yasuda (ヤスダ スズヒト, Yasuda Suzuhito) is a Japanese manga artist and illustrator. He is known as the creator of Yozakura Quartet and for illustrating the light novel series Durarara!! and Is It Wrong to Try to Pick Up Girls in a Dungeon?, all of which have been adapted into anime series. He is also the character designer for the Shin Megami Tensei: Devil Survivor video game series and Digimon Story: Cyber Sleuth.

== Biography ==
Suzuhito began drawing when he was 19 years old, after being inspired by Range Murata's pictures. As an illustrator he usually works with novels; providing the cover art and illustrations. He also makes logo designs for companies and games. Atlus hired him to design the characters from Shin Megami Tensei: Devil Survivor and Shin Megami Tensei: Devil Survivor 2 to appeal to a new audience.

== Works ==
=== Character design ===
==== Games ====
- Shin Megami Tensei: Devil Survivor
- Unchained Blades
- Shin Megami Tensei: Devil Survivor 2
- Digimon World Re:Digitize
- Digimon Story: Cyber Sleuth
- Digimon Story: Cyber Sleuth - Hacker's Memory
- Digimon Story: Time Stranger
- Unchained Blades Exxiv
- Caladrius
- Fire Emblem Heroes (original character designs)

==== Anime ====
- Gundam Build Fighters (2013, cooperation)
- Ai Tenchi Muyo! (2014)
- Dive!! (2017, original character design)
- Salaryman's Club (2022, original character design)

==== Other ====
- Suntory - Suntory Nomu
- Hololive Indonesia - Kaela Kovalskia

=== Artworks ===
- "Ebony & Ivory" chapters in Robot: Super Color Comic volume 1 and 2
- "Minus R" chapter in Robot: Super Color Comic volume 4

=== Light novel illustrations ===
- Kamisama Kazoku (2003–2008, Media Factory)
- Durarara!! (2004–2014, ASCII Media Works)
- Is It Wrong to Try to Pick Up Girls in a Dungeon? (2013–ongoing, SB Creative)
- Durarara!! SH (2014–ongoing, ASCII Media Works)

=== Manga ===
- Pinky:Comic (2005, serialized in Comic Gum, Wani Books)
- Yozakura Quartet (2006–2025, serialized in the Monthly Shōnen Sirius, Kodansha) (2008 licensed by Del Rey Manga)
- Bootsleg (2019, serialized in Monthly Shōnen Sirius)
