= Shadow Star =

Japanese manga series

- First tankōbon volume cover, featuring Hoshimaru (left) and Shiina Tamai (right)

なるたる (Narutaru)
- Genre: Dark fantasy; Mystery; Science fiction
- Manga
- Written by: Mohiro Kitoh
- Published by: Kodansha
- English publisher: NA: Dark Horse Comics
- Imprint: Afternoon KC
- Magazine: Monthly Afternoon
- English magazine: NA: Super Manga Blast!
- Original run: March 25, 1998 – October 25, 2003
- Volumes: 12
- Anime television series
- Directed by: Toshiaki Iino
- Written by: Chiaki J. Konaka
- Music by: Susumu Ueda
- Studio: Planet Entertainment (Note: Production assistance (制作協力) for all episodes provided by Studio Kuma.)
- Licensed by: NA: Central Park Media
- Original network: Kids Station, TBS
- Original run: July 8, 2003 – September 30, 2003
- Episodes: 13
- icon

Shadow Star, known in Japan as Narutaru (Japanese: なるたる), is a Japanese manga series written and illustrated by Mohiro Kitoh, originally serialized in Kodansha's seinen manga magazine Monthly Afternoon from March 1998 to October 2003. The Japanese name is an abbreviation of Mukuro Naru Hoshi, Tama Taru Ko (骸なる星 珠たる子; lit. 'Corpse of a Star; A Precious Child'). An anime television series adaptation produced by Planet Entertainment was broadcast from July to September 2003.

== Plot ==
The protagonist of the series is a twelve-year-old girl named Shiina Tamai. She bonds with a starfish-shaped "dragonchild" (baby "shadow dragon") whom she calls Hoshimaru. The series is mainly about the interaction between Shiina and other young people who have also bonded with dragons.

== Media ==
=== Manga ===
Shadow Star, written and illustrated by Mohiro Kitoh, was serialized in Kodansha's seinen manga magazine Monthly Afternoon from March 1998, (Note: Debuted in the magazine's May 1998 issue, released on March 25, 1998.) to October 2003. (Note: Finished in the magazine's December 2003 issue.) Kodansha collected its chapters in twelve tankōbon volumes, released from August 21, 1998, to December 22, 2003.

In North America, the manga was licensed for English release by Dark Horse Comics and serialized in their Super Manga Blast! manga magazine. The series ran in the magazine from March 29, 2000, to February 1, 2006, when the magazine ceased its publication. Dark Horse Comics collected the chapters in seven volumes, which were released from September 5, 2001, to December 21, 2005.

=== Anime ===
A 13-episode anime adaptation, produced by Planet Entertainment, was broadcast on Kids Station from July 8 to September 30, 2003. (Note: Shadow Star aired on Kids Station on Monday 24:00, effectively Tuesday at 12:00 a.m. JST.) The anime adapted the storyline of the first six volumes (seven volumes of the American release) of the manga.

The anime was licensed by Central Park Media for North America in 2004, under the title Shadow Star Narutaru. It was featured on Comcast's Anime Selects, alongside other Central Park Media titles. In October 2007, it was part of the initial lineup of 21 titles run on the Illusion on-Demand television network. Central Park Media released the series under their "U.S. Manga Corps" line in 2005 on four DVDs, and later re-released the DVDs in a box set in July 2006. Central Park Media filed for bankruptcy in 2009, and the DVDs have since been out of print.

== Reception ==
Reviewing the manga in Manga: The Complete Guide, Jason Thompson acclaimed the writing and artwork, calling it "more of a series about children written for adults ... observing adolescence in hindsight and finding the sense of childlike wonder outweighed by pessimism and cruelty." He compared it to Neon Genesis Evangelion with its concept of "severely disturbed" children being linked to companion monsters along with its increasingly dark tone, rating it three stars out of four. Tasha Robinson of the Sci Fi Channel described the anime series as "transformed" from "fascinatingly quirky" to "slow but expressive".
