= Digimon Story: Cyber Sleuth – Hacker's Memory =

2017 role-playing video game

- North American cover art
- Developer: Media.Vision (Note: Ported to Nintendo Switch and Windows by h.a.n.d.)
- Publisher: Bandai Namco Entertainment
- Director: Hideaki Kikuchi
- Producer: Kazumasa Habu
- Designer: Tomoki Inoue
- Artist: Suzuhito Yasuda
- Composer: Masafumi Takada
- Series: Digimon
- Platforms: PlayStation 4, PlayStation Vita, Nintendo Switch, Windows
- Release: December 14, 2017: PS4, Vita; JP: December 14, 2017; WW: January 19, 2018 Nintendo Switch; JP: October 17, 2019; NA: October 18, 2019; EU: October 18, 2019 Windows; NA: October 18, 2019; EU: October 18, 2019; JP: August 5, 2026
- Genre: Role-playing
- Modes: Single-player, multiplayer

Digimon Story: Cyber Sleuth – Hacker's Memory (Note: Japanese: デジモンストーリー サイバースルゥース ハッカーズメモリー, Hepburn: Dejimon Sutōrī: Saibā Surūsu: Hakkāzu Memorī) is a role-playing video game developed by Media.Vision and published by Bandai Namco Entertainment for PlayStation 4 and PlayStation Vita. It is the follow-up to 2015's Digimon Story: Cyber Sleuth, part of the Digimon Story series, and based on the larger Digimon franchise. The game shares elements and locations from its predecessor, while featuring a new story set during its events.

The game was released in Japan on December 14, 2017, and worldwide on January 19, 2018. A port of the game and its predecessor, Digimon Story Cyber Sleuth: Complete Edition, was released on October 18, 2019, for Nintendo Switch and Windows. The PC versions were released in Japan on August 5, 2026.

== Gameplay ==
Digimon Story: Cyber Sleuth – Hacker's Memory is a role-playing game, played from a third-person perspective where the player takes control of Keisuke Amasawa, a Digimon tamer who can command up to three of his companions in battle against other Digimon. The player can choose between either Gotsumon, Betamon, or Tentomon as their partner at the start of the game, with more obtainable as the story is progressed.

It features 341 creatures in total, including all those present in the original version of Digimon Story: Cyber Sleuth, plus an additional 92. It also contains many of the original areas and maps found in its predecessor along with new additions.

== Plot ==
Hacker's Memory takes place in the same world and timeline as the original Digimon Story: Cyber Sleuth: a near-future version of Shibuya, Japan including an advanced form of the internet known as Cyberspace EDEN that led to digital creatures called Eaters entering the real world. The story revolves around a boy named Keisuke Amasawa (天沢ケイスケ, Amasawa Keisuke). After his EDEN Account is stolen, he joins a group of hackers called "Hudie" and searches the underground of EDEN to find the culprit using information from mysterious hacker K. Along the way, he befriends a number of Digimon, digital lifeforms who inhabit the information world. Keisuke is assisted in his mission by Erika Mishima (御島エリカ, Mishima Erika), a shy, reclusive member of Hudie who possesses a genius mind that can link directly to EDEN itself, and her Digimon partner Wormmon. Characters from the original Cyber Sleuth, such as Fei and her partner TigerVespamon from the hacker group Zaxon, also appear; this shows a previously unseen side of their story from the previous title.

Following K's leads, Keisuke eventually learns that K had stolen Keisuke's account and had been using it the entire time. Keisuke later finds that K was his childhood friend Yu, who was madly in love with him and was being manipulated by a Matadormon that Keisuke defeats. Embarrassed by everything he's done, Yu ignores Keisuke.

Hudie member Chitose is infected by an Eater while protecting the Hudie leader, Ryuji, who goes into a deep depression from seeing his best friend sacrifice himself for him. This dark depression attracts the Digimon Arcadiamon, which manipulates Ryuji into committing violence against hackers. Keisuke and Erika, a disabled Hudie member who has to store her memories in EDEN, hack an Eater and use its data to reach the Eaters' home world and find Chitose's mental data. Chitose recovers, shocking Ryuji out of Arcadiamon's control. In a battle with Arcadiamon, Erika has to use the Eater Bits, which she had created using the previous hacked Eater data, to kill Arcadiamon. Erika passes out from overexertion, and her Eater Bits forcibly merge with her to become Eater Legion.

Keisuke, Chitose and Ryuji attempt to defeat Eater Legion without killing the body, but this proves to be impossible and Erika instructs them to kill Eater Legion as her body was too assimilated with it. Erika's uncorrupted memory data from her server merges with her Wormmon to become Hudiemon and she kills her original body. Due to the defeat of the Mother Eater, reality is changed so that EDEN never existed, which in turn means that Digimon never entered the real world. Erika makes the choice to remain as Hudiemon because her survival in the human world depends on the now-nonexistent EDEN. In addition, she was directly responsible for the death of her parents in an accident that also caused her illness, so erasing herself out of existence will not only remove all burdens from her brother but will also cause her parents to stay alive.

Hudie return to the real world, and everyone's memories of Digimon and Erika are erased, except for Keisuke. Without Erika in the new world, Ryuji is an only child with his parents still alive. He is still the leader of Hudie with Chitose and Keisuke working for him. Without Matadormon's influence, Yu is a member of Hudie and remains on good terms with Keisuke. The group decides to go out to celebrate Ryuji getting a job. Before leaving, Keisuke goes to see Erika's bedroom, discovers that it is now used for storage, and cries. However, on the way back to catch up with the group, a glowing blue butterfly flies past Keisuke's face and into the storage room. It then flies into a monitor, that turns on to reveal Keisuke's Digimon, as well as Erika and Wormmon. The game's producer confirmed the butterfly was Erika visiting her former friends, and that she had used her newfound powers as Hudiemon to create an alternate universe in which she lives happily with alternate versions of them.

== Development ==
Hacker's Memory was first announced in a March 2017 issue of Japanese V Jump magazine as the follow-up to the original Digimon Story: Cyber Sleuth, where it was released on December 14, 2017. The Japanese PlayStation 4 version is bundled with the previous Cyber Sleuth title, which was originally a Western-exclusive port. Bandai Namco described the game as an "other side" story that tells the events leading up to and including the previous entry from the perspective of a new character. It also re-uses many assets from its predecessor, including maps and Digimon, while adding many of its own. On December 28, the Japanese Digimon games account tweeted that if their tweet got more than 2018 retweets before January 5, four new Digimon would be added to the game as free DLC. The amount was achieved in a few hours. Famitsu later revealed the four Digimon would be Ouryumon and his evolution line. They later added a stretch goal of 10,000 retweets to add one more Digimon. The retweets reached 10,000 one day before the deadline. The first four DLC Digimon were added on January 24. The final DLC Digimon was revealed as Apocalymon with it being added at some point in February. Apocalymon was added on February 13. The Sistermon Noir/Blanc pre-order DLC was censored in North America, due to Noir being a nun and this not being suitable in North America, so Noir was changed from a black cat-like nun Digimon, into a blue mouse-like nun Digimon as Namco USA had forced the change. Every other region however was unaffected by the censorship and had access to Noir, rather than the censored Ciel.

An English version was released on January 19, 2018. As with the previous game, the game's soundtrack was composed and produced by Masafumi Takada, and with character designs by Suzuhito Yasuda.

The Nintendo Switch and PC versions were developed by h.a.n.d.

== Reception ==
Reception

Aggregate score
Aggregator	Score
Metacritic	73/100

Review scores
Publication	Score
Famitsu	35/40
GameRevolution	4/5
Hardcore Gamer	3.5/5
PlayStation LifeStyle	8/10

Both the PlayStation Vita and PlayStation 4 versions of Hacker's Memory received a 35 out of 40 total score from Japanese magazine Weekly Famitsu based on individual scores of 9, 9, 9, and 8.

Hacker's Memory received average to mixed reviews upon its English release, earning a 73 out of 100 average from aggregate review website Metacritic.

=== Sales ===
In Japan, Hacker's Memory suffered lower than expected sales. According to Media Create sales data, the Vita version sold 24,636 copies in its debut week, with the PlayStation 4 version selling 20,890 copies, becoming the ninth and tenth highest-selling software titles respectively for that period in the region. In the UK, Hacker's Memory was the tenth best selling game in the first week of its release. Hacker's Memory was the highest selling PS Vita game of 2018 in the US. By October 2020, Hacker's Memory and Cyber Sleuth had shipped more than 1.5 million units worldwide combined. The Switch port of Complete Edition sold 4,536 copies in its first week in Japan. By March 2025, they had sold a combined 2.5 million, and by May 2026, 3 million.
