= List of WonderSwan Color games =

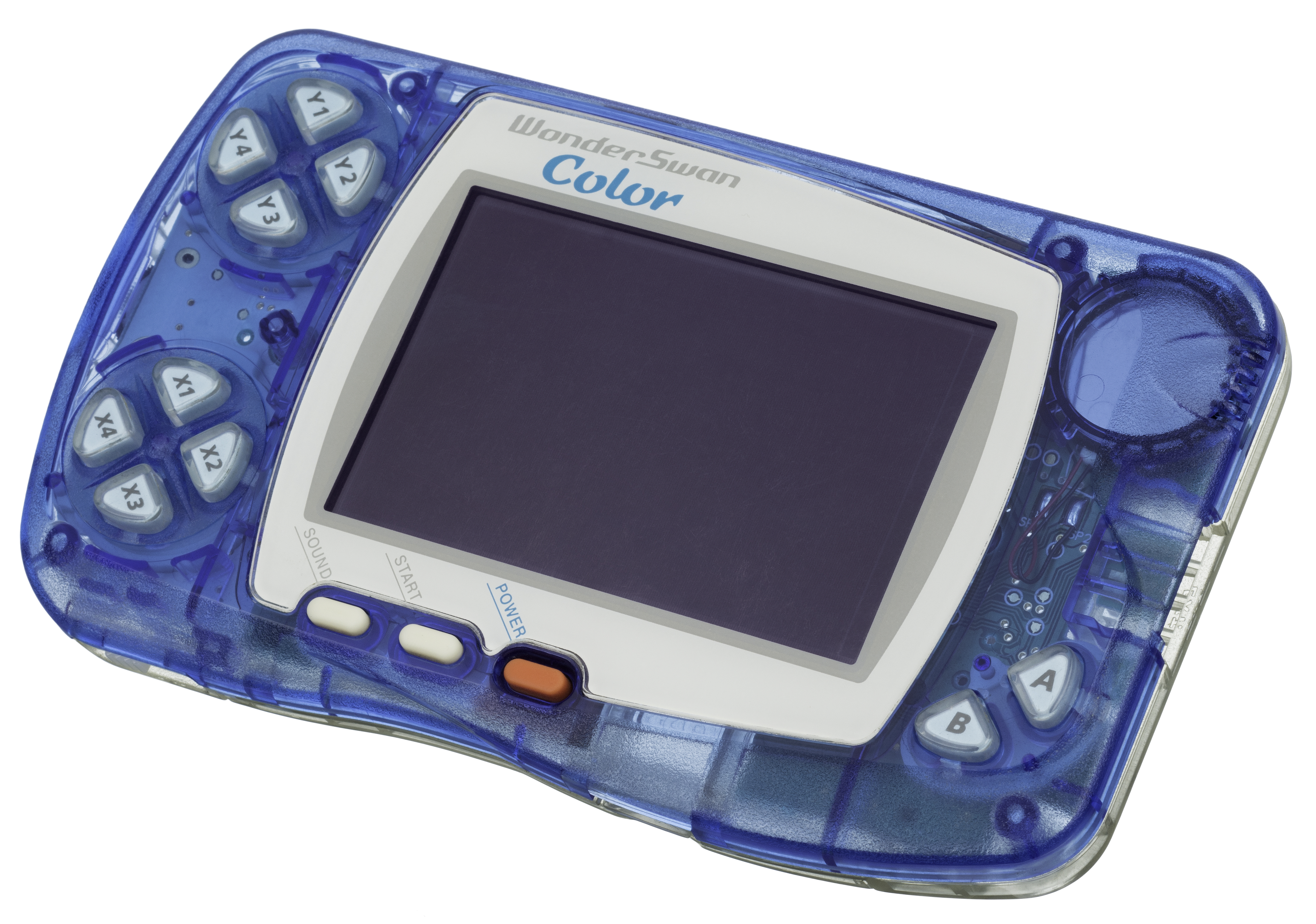
The WonderSwan Color

This is a list of games for the Bandai WonderSwan Color handheld video game system, organized alphabetically by name. Games for the original WonderSwan also work on the WonderSwan Color, but are listed separately.

The WonderSwan Color has 91 (Note: This number is always up to date by this script.) games.

Title	Backwards compatible	Publisher	Release date
Alchemist Marie & Elie - Futari no Atelier	No	E3 Staff	October 25, 2001
Another Heaven: Memory of Those Days	Yes	Omega Micott	December 21, 2000
Arc the Lad: Kishin Fukkatsu	No	Bandai	July 4, 2002
Battle Spirits: Digimon Frontier	No	Bandai	December 7, 2002
Blue Wing Blitz	Yes	Square	July 5, 2001
Dark Eyes: BattleGate	Yes	Bandai	March 15, 2001
Dicing Knight Period	No	Qute	May 31, 2004
Digimon Adventure 02: D1 Tamers	Yes	Bandai	December 9, 2000
Digimon Anode/Cathode Tamer: Veedramon Version	No	Bandai	September 18, 2001
Digimon Card Game Ver. WSC	No	Bandai	March 16, 2002
Digimon Tamers: Battle Spirit	No	Bandai	October 5, 2001
Digimon Tamers: Battle Spirit Ver. 1.5	No	Bandai	April 27, 2002
Digimon Tamers: Brave Tamer	No	Bandai	December 29, 2001
Digimon Tamers: Digimon Medley	Yes	Bandai	July 12, 2001
Digital Monsters: D-Project	No	Bandai	August 3, 2002
Dokodemo Hamster 3	Yes	Bec	December 14, 2000
Dragon Ball	No	Bandai	November 20, 2003
Final Fantasy	No	Square	December 9, 2000
Final Fantasy II	No	Square	May 2, 2001
Final Fantasy IV	No	Square	March 29, 2002
Final Lap Special	No	Bandai	November 15, 2001
Flash Koibito-Kun	Yes	Kobunsha	December 28, 2000
Front Mission	No	Square	July 12, 2002
Gekitou! Crush Gear Turbo: Gear Champion League	No	Bandai	August 10, 2002
Gensoumaden Saiyuuki: Retribution	No	Mubik	June 7, 2001
Golden Axe	No	Bandai	February 28, 2002
Gransta Chronicle	No	Omega Micott	June 13, 2002
Guilty Gear Petit	No	Sammy Corporation	January 25, 2001
Guilty Gear Petit 2	No	Sammy Corporation	September 27, 2001
Gunpey EX	No	Bandai	December 9, 2000
Hanjuku Hero: Aa, Sekaiyo Hanjukunare...!	No	Square	February 14, 2002
Hataraku Chocobo	Yes	Square	September 21, 2000
Hunter × Hunter: Greed Island	No	Bandai	April 24, 2003
Hunter × Hunter: Michikareshi Mono	No	Bandai	August 23, 2001
Hunter × Hunter: Sorezore no Ketsui	No	Bandai	April 26, 2001
Inuyasha: Fuuun Emaki	No	Bandai	July 27, 2002
Inuyasha: Kagome no Sengoku Yume Hiki	No	Bandai	November 2, 2001
Inuyasha: Kagome no Yume Nikki	No	Bandai	November 16, 2002
Judgement Silversword -Rebirth Edition-	No	M-Kai	February 2, 2004
Kidou Senshi Gundam Seed	No	Bandai	March 15, 2003
Kidou Senshi Gundam Vol. 1 SIDE7	No	Bandai	February 1, 2001
Kidou Senshi Gundam Vol. 2 Jaburo	No	Bandai	August 16, 2001
Kidou Senshi Gundam Vol. 3	No	Bandai	May 25, 2002
Kidou Senshi Gundam: Giren no Yabou	No	Bandai	May 2, 2003
Kinnikuman Nisei: Choujin Seisenshi	No	Bandai	January 30, 2003
Kinnikuman Nisei: Dream Tag Match	No	Bandai	March 2, 2002
Kurupara	No	Tom Create	June 14, 2001
Last Alive	No	Bandai	July 26, 2001
Makai Toushi SaGa	No	Square	March 20, 2002
Meitantei Conan: Yuugure Oujo	Yes	Bandai	April 15, 2001
Memories Off Festa	No	KID	March 8, 2001
Mikeneko Holmes: Ghost Panic	No	Koubunsha	April 26, 2001
Mr. Driller	No	Namco	April 15, 2001
Namco Super Wars	No	Bandai	October 31, 2002
Naruto: Konoha Ninpouchou	No	Bandai	March 27, 2003
One Piece: Chopper no Daibouken	No	Bandai	October 16, 2003
One Piece: Niji no Shima Densetsu	No	Bandai	September 13, 2001
One Piece: Swan Colosseum	No	Bandai	July 12, 2002
One Piece: Treasure Wars	No	Bandai	January 3, 2002
One Piece: Treasure Wars 2	No	Bandai	December 20, 2002
Pocket no Naka no Doraemon	Yes	Bandai	May 24, 2001
Raku Jongg	No	Bandai	May 31, 2001
Rhyme Rider Kerorican	No	Bandai	December 9, 2000
Riviera: The Promised Land	No	Bandai	July 12, 2002
Rockman EXE N1 Battle	No	Capcom	August 8, 2003
Rockman EXE WS	No	Bandai	February 8, 2003
Romancing SaGa	No	Square	December 20, 2001
Run=Dim: Return to Earth	No	Digital Dream	February 7, 2002
Saint Seiya: Ougon Densetsuhen Perfect Edition	No	Bandai	July 31, 2003
SD Gundam Eiyuuden: Kishi Densetsu	Yes	Bandai	March 15, 2001
SD Gundam Eiyuuden: Musha Densetsu	Yes	Bandai	March 15, 2001
SD Gundam G Generation: Gather Beat 2	No	Bandai	June 14, 2001
SD Gundam G Generation: Mono-Eye Gundams	No	Bandai	September 26, 2002
SD Gundam: Operation U.C.	No	Bandai	February 16, 2002
Senkai-den Nii: TV Animation Senkai-den hōshin engi yori	Yes	Bandai	December 21, 2000
Shaman King: Asu he no Ishi	No	Bandai	August 29, 2002
Soroban Gu	Yes	Kaga Tech	December 9, 2000
Star Hearts	No	Bandai	September 27, 2001
Super Robot Taisen Compact 3	No	Banpresto	July 17, 2003
Super Robot Taisen Compact for WonderSwan Color	No	Banpresto	December 13, 2001
Tonpuso	No	Bandai	June 28, 2001
Terrors 2	Yes	Bandai	December 21, 2000
Tetris	Yes	Vanguard	April 18, 2002
Uchuu Senkan Yamato	Yes	Bandai Visual	February 8, 2001
Ultraman - Hikari no Kuni no Shisha	No	Bandai	June 21, 2001
Wild Card	No	Square	March 29, 2001
With You: Mitsumete Itai	No	Cocktail Soft	January 25, 2001
Wizardry Scenario 1: Proving Grounds of the Mad Overlord	Yes	Bandai	March 1, 2001
Wonder Classic	Yes	Bandai	January 18, 2001
X: Card of Fate	No	Bandai	June 27, 2002
XI (sai) Little	No	Bandai	December 20, 2001

== Cancelled games ==
Title	Publisher
Chocobo no Fushigi na Dungeon 2	Square
Dice de Chocobo	Square
Digimon Tamers: Digimon Action	Bandai
Final Fantasy III	Square
Higashikaze Shou	Bandai
Inuyasha 2	Bandai
Mobile Suit Gundam: MSPlatoon.com	Bandai
Ochisuzume	Bandai
Princess Maker: Yumemiru Yousei	Bandai Visual
Seiken Densetsu 2	Square
