= SwanCrystal =

2002 handheld game console

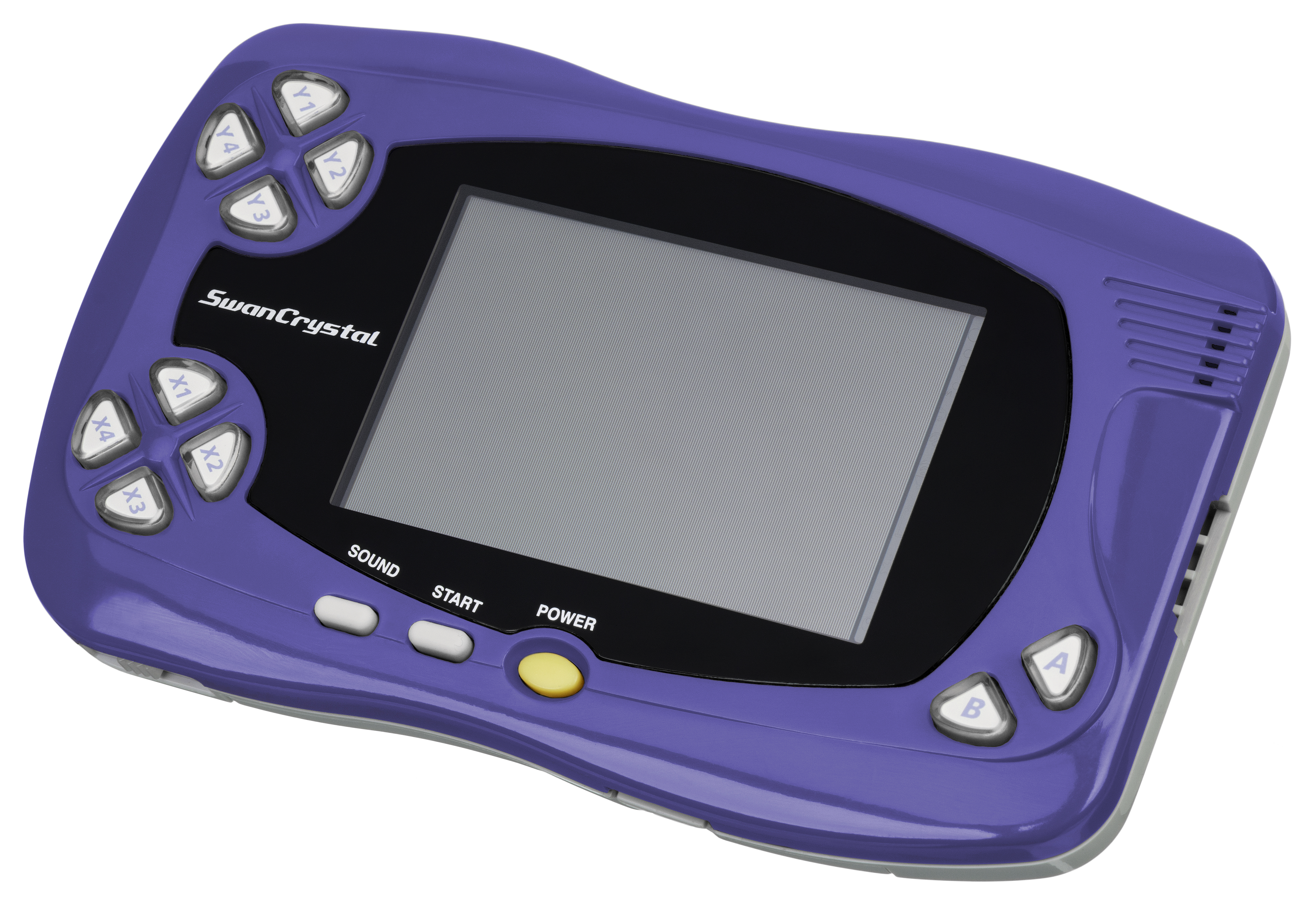
- Manufacturer: Bandai
- Product family: WonderSwan
- Type: Handheld game console
- Generation: Sixth Generation
- Released: JP: July 12, 2002
- Media: Cartridge
- CPU: SPGY-1003 clocked at 3.072MHz
- Memory: 64KB shared VRAM / WRAM
- Display: 224x144 pixels, 241 on-screen colours out of a possible 4096
- Power: One AA battery
- Dimensions: 127.7 x 77.5 x 24.3mm
- Weight: 95g (3.35 oz) (including battery)
- Backward compatibility: WonderSwan, WonderSwan Color
- Predecessor: WonderSwan Color

The SwanCrystal (スワンクリスタル, Suwankurisutaru) is the third and final release in Bandai's WonderSwan handheld game console series, succeeding the WonderSwan and WonderSwan Color. It was released in Japan on July 12, 2002

== Features ==
The SwanCrystal was a 16-bit handheld game console that like its predecessors, was powered by one AA battery. It allowed the input of personal data such as name, birth date, gender, and blood type by holding the Start button while turning the system on (this was possible in both the previous consoles as well). It was compatible with all previous games for both the WonderSwan Color and the original WonderSwan. It was available in four different colors: Skeleton Blue, Skeleton Black, Blue Violet and Red Wine.

== Hardware specifications ==
- CPU: SPGY-1003, at 3.072 MHz 16-bit NEC V30MZ Clone
- Memory: 64Kbyte VRAM/WRAM (shared)
- Screen:
  - TFT reflective Liquid crystal display
  - 2.8 inch (71 mm) diagonal
  - no backlight
  - resolution: 224x144 pixels
  - colors: 241 out of 4096 colors
- Sound: Built-in mono speaker or stereo with optional headphones adapter
  - Four volume settings selectable via button: loud, medium, soft, mute
- Link: Two players (adapter needed)
- Power: one AA battery (~15 hours of game play)
- Size: 127.7 by 77.5 by 24.3 mm
- Weight 95 g (3.35 oz) including battery

== See also ==
- List of WonderSwan games
- List of WonderSwan Color games
