= Mega Kid MK-1000 =

Nintendo Entertainment System hardware clone

The Mega Kid MK-1000 is a Famiclone with a built-in Family BASIC compatible keyboard, marketed as an "educational computer".

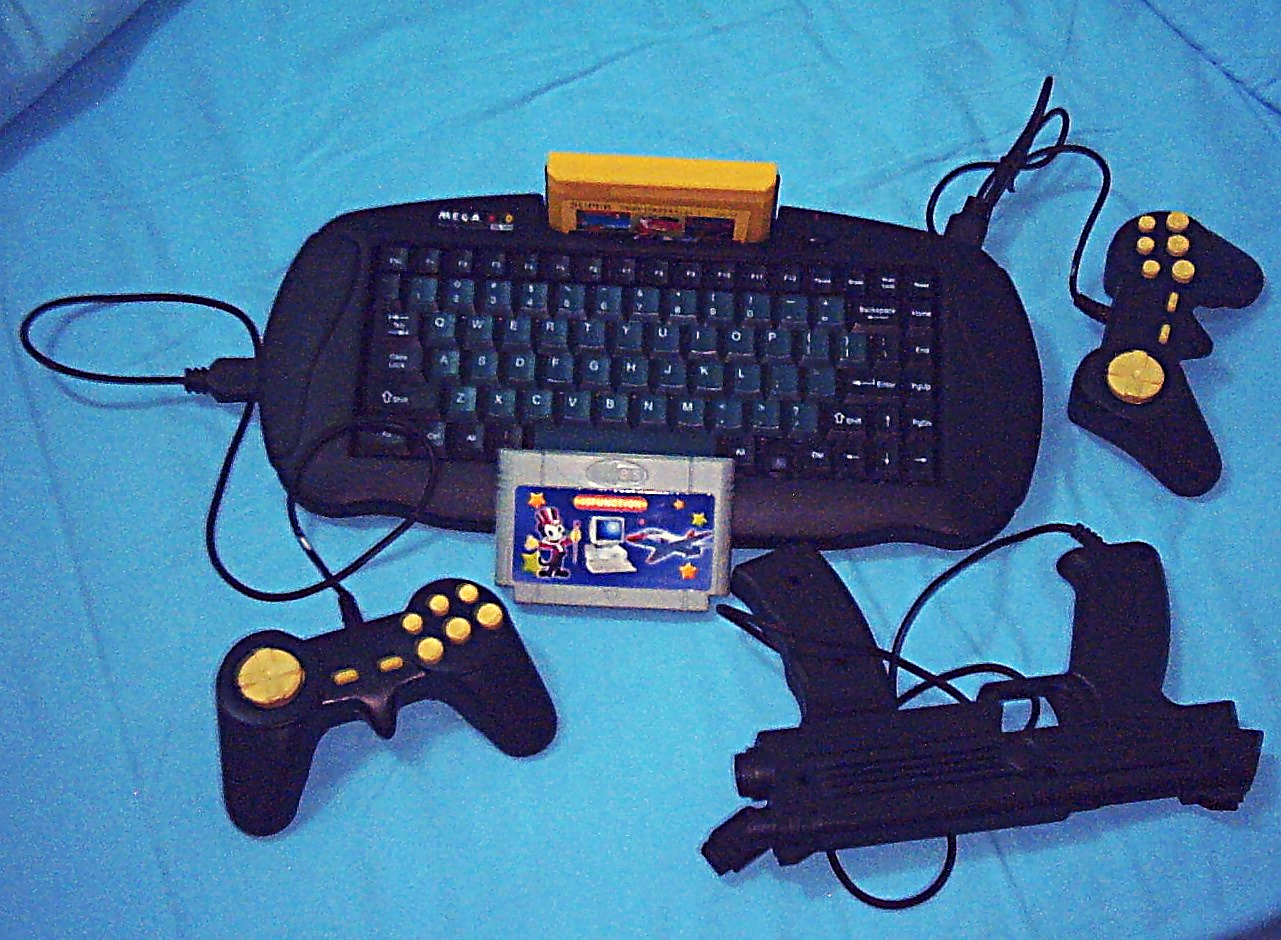
A Mega Kid MK-1000 Computer type Famiclone

The system comes with two black PlayStation look-alike controllers and a black NES Zapper clone resembling a submachine gun. All are connected with 9-pin DB connectors, as found on most Famiclones.

It has a composite video output and a mono audio output, as well as a rather crude RF modulator antenna output, unfiltered (the output appears on several TV channels) and unshielded from interferences.

In its box is contained a Famicom cartridge containing several applications that work with the keyboard, such as crude word processors, keyboard exercises, mathematical games, G-BASIC and a handful of first generation Famicom/NES games such as F 1 Race, Track & Field and "Jewel Tetris".

This cartridge also contains an additional 64 K static RAM chip, mainly for use with the provided G-BASIC, a dialect of the BASIC programming language designed for the Famicom. However, no CMOS backup memory is provided, so any typed-in program or text will be lost upon rebooting or switching the power off.

It works with standard Famicom cartridges, as well as NES cartridges with the use of an adaptor.
