= ZeroRanger =

2018 video game

- Developer: System Erasure
- Publisher: System Erasure
- Designers: Eero Lahtinen; Antti Ukkola
- Programmer: Eero Lahtinen
- Artist: Antti Ukkola
- Composer: Eero Lahtinen
- Engine: GameMaker Studio
- Platform: Windows
- Release: 28 September 2018
- Genre: Scrolling shooter
- Modes: Single-player, multiplayer

ZeroRanger is a scrolling shooter developed by Finnish studio System Erasure and released for Microsoft Windows in September 2018. ZeroRanger is primarily a vertically scrolling shoot 'em up, with side scrolling in some levels. The player operates one of two spaceflight-capable fighter aircraft. Players unlock new weapons and abilities after defeating bosses, including the ability to transform into mechas.

== Gameplay ==
ZeroRanger takes place on an Earth-like planet called Daikon, where aliens known as Green Orange have invaded with the intent of destroying all life. The aliens take control of Daikon's planetary defense force with the exception of two fighters. These two remaining fighters must combat their planet's possessed defense force before they can reach and destroy the main Green Orange vessel.

The current version of ZeroRanger contains two game modes: Green Orange and White Vanilla. Green Orange is considered the main game mode, encompassing the majority of the game's story. White Vanilla is presented as a score-focused training simulation that takes place before the events of Green Orange, consisting of arranged segments of stages from Green Orange. The third and final mode, Black Onion, is still in development.

ZeroRanger uses a green and orange color scheme. More color schemes can be unlocked.

The game borrows elements of Buddhist enlightenment, which are communicated to the players through riddle-like interstitials and interludes.

== Development ==
Gameplay

Development of the game started with a piece of concept art in February 2008. The game was named FINAL BOSS and revealed in November 2009. The game was later given more unique names so that the game would be easier to search for on Google; the game was first renamed to FINALBOSS, and in April 2018 it was again renamed, to ZeroRanger.

The first idea during development was to create a vertical scrolling shoot 'em up like Guxt by Studio Pixel. The idea later evolved to become a mash-up of elements from many different shoot 'em up games. Taking inspiration from the limited blue and white color scheme of Guxt, ZeroRanger has a limited green and orange color scheme. The weapon collection system was at first taken from Guxt, where players can collect weapons during stages, and through trial and error evolved to the current system where two weapons are dropped by defeated bosses and players choose one of them. In 2011, the developers were particularly inspired by the "pure energy and spirit of adventure" from Eschatos. Other influences cited by the developer include Cho Ren Sha 68K, Ikaruga, and Flame Zapper Kotsujin. From Cho Ren Sha 68K, the developers tried to incorporate its "feeling of intimidation before you're actually facing the danger". In Ikaruga, "every enemy pattern is distinct from one another"; feeling the impact of this, the ZeroRanger developers aimed to minimize repetition. The release of the role-playing video game Undertale reinforced the developer's desire to make a game with a good soundtrack.

Accessibility was a big goal during the last few years of development. The developers became concerned about how beginners would think about the basic concepts of shoot 'em ups. Concepts such as "continues" were tailored for players new to shoot 'em ups; continues must be earned, and players using a continue must start at a checkpoint within the stage, ensuring that they are learning how to play that part of the game. The developers believed this system caused players to feel more invested in the game and more serious about completing it. The aim was for ZeroRanger to be a very approachable "pick up and play" game, where players would not need to read guides to understand how to play the game.

Scoring was a secondary goal during development. The developers did not want players to feel that they had to plan everything perfectly in order to maintain the game's combo-based score multiplier, or that there is only one correct weapon to use in each situation. The developers intended to release patches if players were to discover any issues that "break" the scoring.

ZeroRanger was developed using GameMaker Studio as the game engine. Development started with GameMaker 6, then moved to GameMaker 8, and later to GameMaker Studio. Switching between these versions caused thousands of compilation errors that were time-consuming to fix. Justifying the effort, the developer cited GameMaker Studio's performance improvements and its introduction of shaders that allowed colors to be easily changed during post-processing, letting the developer make color palettes for the game without having to create new sprites for each palette. Sprites were created using Microsoft Paint. With the exception of two commissioned tracks, all of the game's music was composed by Eero Lahtinen. Sound effects were created using Sfxr, Bfxr and Audacity, as well as free sound libraries.

Several music tracks and two game modes were not finished before the release of the game. The soundtrack to an earlier version of the game was released in February 2017. The soundtrack for the game's first two game modes was released in June 2020. An arrange album, produced by Resonant Union in collaboration with System Erasure, was released on September 28, 2024.

The third and final game mode, Black Onion, is still in development.

== Reception ==
Reception

Review scores
Publication	Score
Cubed3	9/10
HonestGamers	4/5
MeriStation	9/10
V2.fi	4.5/5

Reviewers noted that ZeroRanger was densely packed with references to other shoot 'em ups while still having its own identity. Dominic Tarason of Rock, Paper, Shotgun called ZeroRanger a "lovingly assembled mix-tape featuring the best bits across all of shmup history". Marc Golding of HonestGamers called the game's green and orange color scheme a strange design choice that helped it stand out from other games in the genre; Golding also recognized the game's references to shoot 'em ups developed by Qute.

ZeroRanger was praised for being relatively friendly to casual players, while still having the difficulty expected of arcade-style shoot 'em ups. According to Gabriel Jones of Cubed3, players are "sufficiently challenged, but never frustrated". Players may die often but are awarded extra lives often as well. Players can earn continues, and can start the game on any stage they have previously reached. Jones observed that the game has a dynamic difficulty "rank" system, ensuring that players are treated to gameplay appropriate for their skill level. Flawless controls and a lack of undeserved deaths further contribute to making the game frustration-free. The response towards the game's difficulty was not universally favorable, as Miia Lyyra of V2.fi criticized ZeroRanger for not including selectable difficulty in the initial release. She warned that the difficulty is not attractive to beginner shoot 'em up players, and will leave experienced players thirsting for a greater challenge. Lyyra noted that the developers promised two more difficulty modes in a future update to the game, and suggested that beginners wait for that update. Lyyra felt that the game was otherwise perfect, and awarded it a high rating.

Steven Wright of Variety placed ZeroRanger fourth on a list of the best indie games for 2018.

Reviewers found themselves surprised by the deceptive length of the game.
