= Cho Ren Sha 68K =

1997 video game

- Developer: Famibe no Yosshin
- Publisher: Famibe no Yosshin
- Designer: Koichi Yoshida
- Programmer: Koichi Yoshida
- Artist: Koichi Yoshida
- Composer: Ruzarin Kashiwagi
- Platforms: X68000, Microsoft Windows
- Release: X68000: JP: December 1997; Windows: WW: August 23, 2001
- Genre: Vertically scrolling shooter
- Mode: Single-player

Cho Ren Sha 68K (Note: Japanese: 超連射68K, Hepburn: Chō Ren Sha 68K; lit. 'Super Rapid Fire 68K' or 'Ultra Rapid Fire 68K') is a vertically scrolling shooter video game developed by Koichi "Famibe no Yosshin" Yoshida. The game was first released for the X68000 in 1997 at the 53rd Comic Market (Comiket), followed by a freeware port for Microsoft Windows in 2001. The player controls a ship fighting against waves of enemies and bosses while dodging their projectiles. Destroying an enemy carrier releases a rotating triangle with three items, which can be obtained at once if the player enters and stands in its center for a short period.

Koichi Yoshida began his programming career in his teens with Family BASIC, submitting several shooting game programs to the Japanese publication Micom BASIC Magazine. He started developing Cho Ren Sha 68K for the X68000 in 1993, as guides about its hardware published late in its lifespan led to a growth in the computer's doujin and freeware scenes. One of Yoshida's main goals was to evoke a fun sense of destruction and make shooting exciting, influenced by various shooters. The music was scored by Ruzarin "Loser" Kashiwagi.

Gaming publications gave Cho Ren Sha 68K a generally favorable reception, praising its graphics, soundtrack, gameplay, and intense action. Some publications criticized its short length and repetitive background visual. It is considered one of the best X68000 games and served as an influence for ZeroRanger. Fans have since experimented with porting and remaking the title unofficially to other platforms. In 2023, a version with revamped graphics and sound effects was bundled with the X68000 Z, a miniature recreation of the X68000.

== Gameplay ==
A powered-up ship fighting the boss of the third stage in Cho Ren Sha 68K

Cho Ren Sha 68K is a vertically scrolling shooter game. The player controls a ship fighting against waves of enemies and bosses. The ship can fire bursts of bullets and bombs capable of damaging enemies on-screen. Destroying an enemy carrier releases a rotating triangle containing three items: a weapon power-up that increases bullet spread, extra bombs, and a shield that protects the player from a single hit. The shield explodes upon contact with enemy fire and destroys weaker enemies. The player can choose any one item, causing the others to disappear. All three items can be obtained at once if the player enters and stands in the center of the triangle for a short period while dodging enemy projectiles. Upon picking up an item, the player gains a brief invincibility against enemy projectiles or collisions.

The game's scoring system is based on destroying enemies, earning bonus points upon completing a stage, and collecting items. Points are only awarded for reaching the maximum number of weapon power-ups, as well as having a full stock of bombs and an active shield. For every million points, a shield is replaced with a 1-up item. If the player takes another item, the 1-up will be permanently lost until another million points are reached. Being hit by enemy fire results in the loss of a life and a penalty by reducing the player's firepower to its original state. Once all lives are lost, the player has the option to continue from the last stage reached.

The game consists of seven stages and two loops. The second loop begins after defeating the final boss of the first and increases in difficulty, with destroyed enemies launching projectiles at the player. After defeating the true final boss of the second loop, the player can access more difficult loops using the continue option. A boss rush mode can be accessed through a hidden menu at the configuration screen.

== Development ==
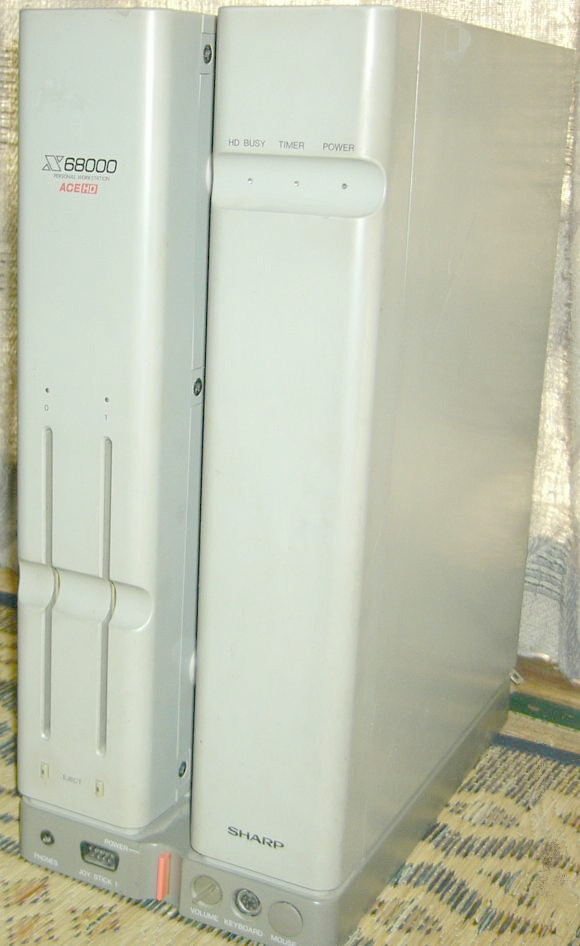
Koichi Yoshida developed Cho Ren Sha 68K for the X68000. Late in the computer's lifespan, guidebooks about its hardware helped grow its doujin and freeware scenes.

Cho Ren Sha 68K was created by designer, programmer, and artist Koichi "Famibe no Yosshin" Yoshida. Yoshida began his video game programming career in his teens with a Family BASIC borrowed from a friend. He spent six years using Family BASIC and submitted several shooter game programs to the Japanese publication Micom BASIC Magazine. These included Metalu! Itou (Note: メタルさ！伊藤 (Metarusa! Itō)) (1990), V5 Denden (Note: V5電電 (V5 Denden)) (1991), and Zacner II (Note: ザクナーII (Zakunā II)) (1993). In 1993, Yoshida started developing the game by establishing a code library for the X68000, as guidebooks about its hardware published late in its lifespan galvanized the computer's doujin and freeware scenes.

One of Yoshida's main goals in his design concept for Cho Ren Sha 68K was to evoke a fun sense of destruction and make shooting exciting. He recalled that the game was influenced by various shooters such as Tatsujin Ō, Batsugun, Battle Garegga, among others. Yoshida wanted to recreate a technique from older shooters where enemies are dealt more damage up close through various mechanics, and he was looking for a balance reminiscent of Star Force. These mechanics contradicted Yoshida's plans for the game, so he decided to constantly reduce the size of enemy hitboxes, resulting in some enemies being redrawn to fit their hitboxes.

Yoshida also manually adjusted enemy firing accuracy based on circumstances, citing titles like Hishōzame, Parodius Da! Shinwa kara Owarai e, and V-V, as examples where enemies had low aiming accuracy. He wanted to use manual firing instead of auto fire, as he felt that the mechanic was on the decline, but decided integrating a semi-auto fire feature into the game. The player's fixed firing width was borrowed from Star Force, but issues arose when Yoshida attempted to modernize it before reaching a compromise. He learned how to balance player firepower from older Toaplan titles, as quadrupling damage to match the appearance of the player's full-power shot would break the game.

Yoshida programmed Cho Ren Sha 68K primarily in C, but used assembly language to increase execution speed. Due to limitations of the X68000 hardware, multiple sound effects could not be played simultaneously, so he prioritized the sound design in a specific order. Yoshida also devised a sprite driver called "XSP", which used a programming technique he created that increased the number of sprites onscreen to overcome the X68000's PCG definition limit. He released his sprite driver at Kusa no Ne, (Note: 草の根 (Kusa no Ne)) a bulletin board system (BBS) where he received feedback for the game's development.

Yoshida opposed playing for score when developing the game, but eventually implemented some elements. When deciding on the scoring system, he debated between an "all-or-nothing" system, where dying made recovery impossible, or allowing mistakes so the player could plan their recovery. Yoshida felt the game ended up with a more "all-or-nothing" system and cited Battle Garegga as a key influence on the scoring system. He considered structuring an item system where the player could freely choose one of three items, but instead devised a mechanic that allowed all three to be obtained simultaneously. This became an integral part of the game's scoring system and invalidated Yoshida's original concept. He regretted adding it, but left it as is, knowing that players would disagree if he removed it.

=== Music ===
The music of Cho Ren Sha 68K was composed by Ruzarin "Loser" Kashiwagi. He had been writing original music for the X68000 and uploading it via a network system during his high school period. Kashiwagi credits Yuzo Koshiro, particularly his work on Ys and Sorcerian, as his biggest influence when he began making music. He took over scoring the soundtrack for the project when a partner known only by the pseudonym "Zuruyan" introduced him to Yoshida, who was looking for a composer during Pasoket, (Note: パソケット (Pasoketto)) a doujin soft sales event held in Osaka by the company of the same name. Kashiwagi drew influence from Battle Garegga and Viewpoint (1992) for the game's music. He stated that he made his own Eurobeat for the first stage, taking inspiration from Namie Amuro's song Taiyou no Season, and regarded the third stage and boss themes to be his favorites.

A soundtrack album for Cho Ren Sha 68K was released in Japan on August 14, 1998, by Denkai Laboratory, an independent circle formed in 1995 by Kashiwagi and Zuruyan. In 2003, Denkai Laboratory distributed a three-CD album at the 64th Comic Market (Comiket) subtitled Complete Edition, containing the game's original soundtrack as well as arranged and reworked tracks. In 2006, the Complete Edition album was reissued through D4 Enterprise's EGG Music digital service. In 2014, Denkai Laboratory re-released the original soundtrack album as a digital download under the subtitle G.I.M.I.C Revival Edition.

== Release ==
The game was first released for the X68000 in December 1994 as a sampler at the 47th Comiket, under the name Sekizui Hansha de Acchoo, (Note: 脊髄反射であっちょー (Sekizui Hansha de Atcho)) in Yoshida's circle "Cho Ren Sha 68K". In August 1995, a version with two stages was sold during the 48th Comiket. It remained under the name Sekisui Hansha de Acchoo until the 49th Comiket. Later versions of the game released at Comiket were distributed under its final title, Cho Ren Sha 68K. The full version with seven stages was released in December 1997 at the 53rd Comiket.

On August 23, 2001, Cho Ren Sha 68K was ported to Microsoft Windows and released on Yoshida's website as freeware. Yoshida decided porting the game to Windows as a learning experience after finishing the X68000 version. The Windows version runs at 60 frames per second (fps) without slowdown, rather than the 55 fps of the original X68000 version, making the game more difficult. In 2005, an update was released that added a hard mode. On May 23, 2017, another update was released that added native support for Windows 10.

An unreleased version of Cho Ren Sha 68K dubbed "1.10", featuring revamped graphics and sound effects, was bundled with the X68000 Z, a miniature recreation of the X68000 released in March 2023. In June 2023, version 1.10 was released on Yoshida's website as a free disk image download for use with real hardware and emulators. In January 2025, an updated Windows version based on version 1.10 was released on Yoshida's website, with an auto rapid fire option added.

== Reception ==
Reception

Review scores
Publication	Score
Freegame.cz	76%
Hrej.cz	6/10

Cho Ren Sha 68K received generally favorable reception. A reviewer for Game Hihyō labelled the game as a doujin masterpiece that represented the X68000. Shooting Gameside's Haruhisa Tanaka called it the most famous original X68000 shooter, arguing that it stood out among doujin titles. Retro Gamer's John Szczepaniak named it one of the three perfect games for the X68000. Hardcore Gaming 101's Maciej Miszczyk lauded its intense gameplay, level design, bosses, and energetic soundtrack, proclaiming the game to be among classics of the shoot 'em up genre. In 2017, the Japanese publication DOS/V Power Report identified it as one of the top 100 PC games. In 2022, Time Extension also listed it as one of the best X68000 games.

Windows Forest's Masaho Saitō praised the gameplay, feeling that finding a strategy to achieve a high score was fun. He highlighted the game's detailed enemy design and music, but noted the low screen resolution in the Windows version. Home of the Underdogs' Sarinee Achavanuntakul considered it an excellent shooter, praising its graphics and soundtrack, but faulted its short length. Atomix's Remy Bastien praised the game's intense action, eye-catching sprites, and soundtrack, but noted that the repetitive background could cause visual monotony. Hardcore Gamer's James Cunningham assessed that "Cho Ren Sha 68K may not be the fanciest shooter out there but it nails that classic feel". Dominik Wetter of Freegame.cz commented positively on the game's fast-paced action, but criticized the need to constantly shoot. Filip Štochl of Hrej.cz said the game did not offer anything unseen elsewhere.

== Legacy ==
Former Sega staffer Tetsu "Tez" Okano, known for his directorial work on titles such as Segagaga, Astro Boy: Omega Factor, and Gunstar Super Heroes, considered Cho Ren Sha 68K one of his favorite shooting games. Developers Antti "Ebbo" Ukkola and Eero "Eebrozgi" Lahtinen of System Erasure cited the game as an influence on ZeroRanger. In a 2018 interview with 4Gamer.net, Rival Megagun creator Justin Rempel proclaimed Cho Ren Sha 68K to be the shooting game he admires most.

In the years since, fans have experimented with unofficial ports and remakes of Cho Ren Sha 68K to other platforms. In 2015, a beta of an Atari Falcon port, developed by Sascha "Anima" Springer, was released online. In 2016, Takashi "Faw Labo" Yamashita, who had worked as a programmer on games such as Super Star Soldier and Star Parodier, created a demake of the game for the Super Cassette Vision. In 2026, an Amiga port, developed by Adam "apolkosnik" Polkosnik with AI assistance, was released online.
