= List of Family BASIC games =

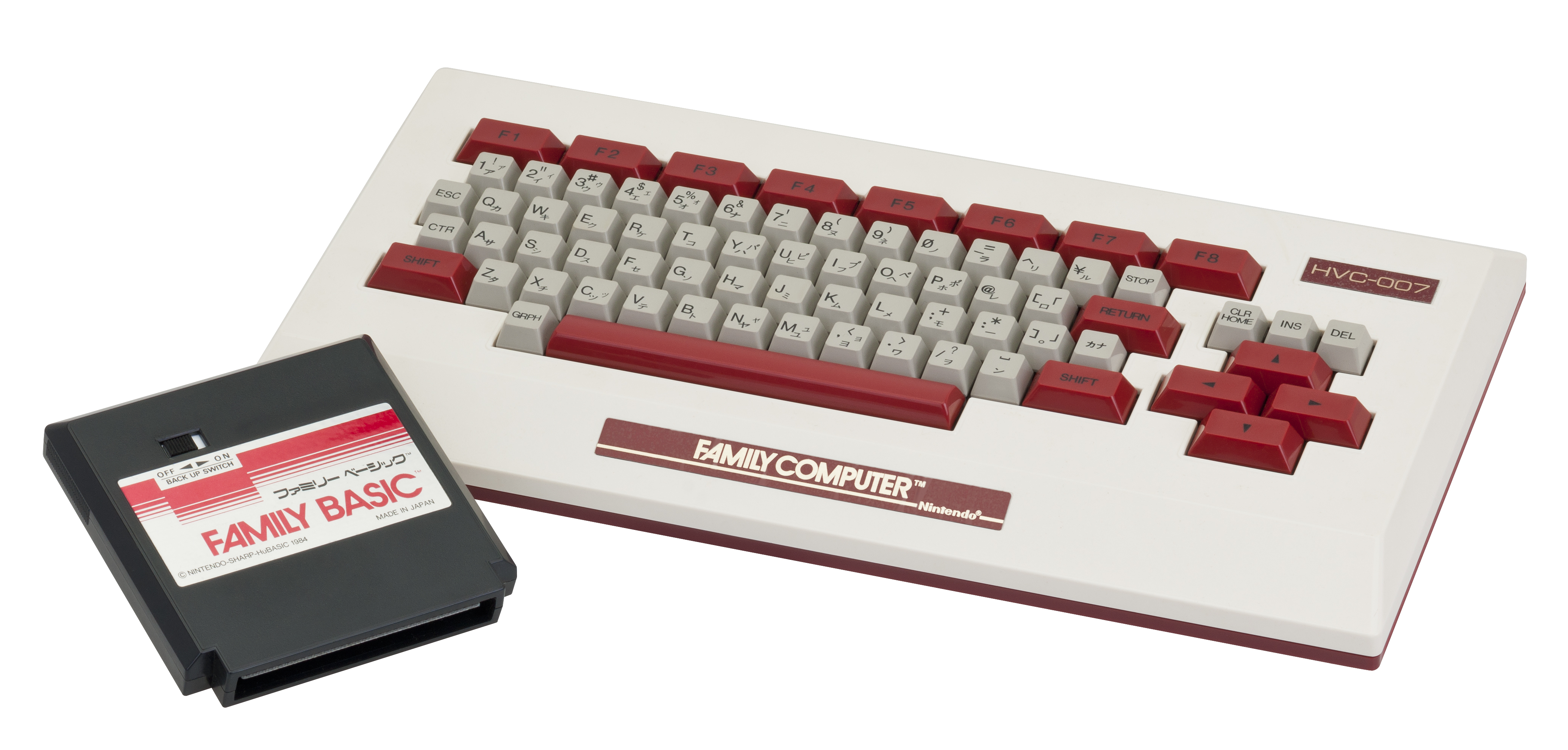
The Family BASIC keyboard with application cartridge

Family BASIC is a consumer product for programming the Family Computer (Famicom), released in 1984. It was developed in collaboration between Nintendo, Hudson Soft, and Sharp Corporation, to attract computer users. Family BASIC allows writing game programs that can be saved on an included cassette recorder. Many games and demos made by hobbyists were released in Japanese books and magazines.

== Games ==
This list has 479 games. (Note: This number is always current by this script.)

Title	Genre(s)	Developer(s)	Year	Ref.
21 Blackjack	Cards	Toshiyasu Ukita	1985	
Penguin's Bar	Arcade	Kaz	1985	
Number Game	Puzzle	Yazuryu	1985	
Slot Machine	Casino	Noroyama Junior	1985	
High & Low	Cards	Toshiyasu Ukita	1985	
Beep Number	Puzzle	Kaz	1985	
Mario no Hashiri Waba Tobi	Sports	Mizuno Ameotoko	1985	
Family Tox Boy	Puzzle	Wataru Morohoshi	1985	
Shooting Game	Shoot 'em up	Kaz	1985	
Shooting Game Vol. 2	Shoot 'em up	Kaz	1985	
Kick The Ball	Action	Kaz	1985	
3D Game	Shoot 'em up	Mitsuaki Honma	1985	
Family Basic Master	Puzzle	Professor Famibe	1985	
Puzzle	Puzzle	Kiyoshi Yamada	1986	
Family Sugoroku	Party	Toshiyasu Ukita	1986	
Peking Duck Hunt	Puzzle	Takahiro Yasumura	1986	
Untitled Game	Shoot 'em up	—N/a	1985	
Fly Fly	Shoot 'em up	—N/a	1985	
Asteroid	Simulation	—N/a	1985	
Flyfall	Shoot 'em up	—N/a	1985	
Commander	Shooter	—N/a	1985	
Imomushi Gorogoro	Snake	—N/a	1985	
Turtle Race	Racing	—N/a	1985	
Tic Tac Bomb	Action	—N/a	1985	
Mario de Janken	Strategy	—N/a	1985	
Mario Kick	Action	—N/a	1985	
Life Game	Simulation	—N/a	1985	
Rally	Driving	—N/a	1985	
Girl Hunt	Cards	—N/a	1985	
Moo	Puzzle	—N/a	1985	
Refrection	Puzzle	—N/a	1985	
Bomber Attack	Shoot 'em up	—N/a	1985	
Laser Command	Shoot 'em up	—N/a	1985	
Penguin Ski	Sports	—N/a	1985	
Penguin and Crow	Action	—N/a	1985	
Nigeru na Kame yo!	Action	—N/a	1985	
Kurō Kuru na!	Action	—N/a	1985	
Bowling	Sports	—N/a	1985	
Penguin Tataki	Puzzle	—N/a	1985	
5 Square	Puzzle	—N/a	1985	
Roulette	Casino	—N/a	1985	
Blackjack	Cards	—N/a	1985	
Dodgem	Strategy	—N/a	1985	
Nim	Puzzle	—N/a	1985	
Tower of Hanoi	Puzzle	—N/a	1985	
Clash Line	Snake	—N/a	1985	
Person Snatch	Puzzle	—N/a	1985	
Fighter Battle	Shoot 'em up	—N/a	1985	
Tank	Shooter	—N/a	1985	
Mario vs Ruīdo	Action	—N/a	1985	
Mario's Mail Delivery	Action	—N/a	1985	
Fishing	Fishing	—N/a	1985	
Natsu no Bochi	Action	—N/a	1985	
Ball Oar	Puzzle	—N/a	1985	
Golf	Sports	—N/a	1985	
Cross Puzzle	Puzzle	—N/a	1985	
Poker	Cards	—N/a	1985	
Sound Complex	Music	—N/a	1985	
Black Box	Puzzle	—N/a	1985	
Mini Trek	Strategy	—N/a	1985	
Super Tagosaku Shizuoka Special	Platform	Masashi Morita	1986	
Super Tagosaku Shizuoka Special 2	Platform	Masashi Morita	1986	
Tatakae! Mario, Redi o Mamore!!	Roguelike	—N/a	1986	
Uteba Odoroki Special Game	Platform	—N/a	1986	
Uteba Odoroki Special Game 2	Action	Masashi Morita	1986	
Defend Base	Shoot 'em up	—N/a	1985	
Family Slot Machine	Casino	—N/a	1985	
Jumping Mario	Sports	—N/a	1985	
Super 9 Color	Puzzle	—N/a	1985	
Morita-san Chi no Mario-kun	Platform	—N/a	1985	
Find Mario!	Puzzle	—N/a	1985	
Slot Characters	Casino	—N/a	1986	
Mastermind	Puzzle	—N/a	1986	
Slot Machine Game	Casino	—N/a	1985	
Roulette Game	Casino	—N/a	1985	
Mario's 100-Meter Race	Sports	—N/a	1985	
Sugoroku Game	Party	—N/a	1985	
Lumberjack Mario	Action	—N/a	1985	
Nitanita Bounding	Puzzle	—N/a	1985	
Block Crusher	Action	—N/a	1985	
Nitanita Maze	Maze	—N/a	1985	
Pen Pen	Action	—N/a	1985	
Pen Pen Catch	Action	—N/a	1985	
Pen Pen's Great Adventure	Adventure	—N/a	1986	
Dungeon & Mario	Action	—N/a	1985	
Cosmo Gunship	Shooter	—N/a	1985	
Star Chase	Shooter	—N/a	1985	
Kanikani Hoshibito Shūrai	Action	—N/a	1986	
Wonderland Balloon	Arcade	—N/a	1986	
Exciting Sugoroku Roulette	Casino	—N/a	1986	
Maze Panic	Maze	—N/a	1986	
Anata no Nōryoku Dorekurai?	Puzzle	—N/a	1986	
25 Panels	Puzzle	—N/a	1986	
Moon Landing	Simulation	—N/a	1986	
Yoi ko no Kakekko Kyōsō	Racing	—N/a	1986	
Sanpo de Yoisho!	Action	—N/a	1986	
Janken, Pon	Strategy	—N/a	1986	
Walk Walk Game	Action	—N/a	1986	
Let's Hustle	Snake	—N/a	1986	
Break Block Special	Action	—N/a	1986	
Operation Manhole	Action	—N/a	1986	
Fire Rescue Team	Action	—N/a	1986	
Slot Machine	Casino	—N/a	1986	
Balloon Bomber	Maze	—N/a	1986	
Rittai! Sanjingen Maze	Dungeon crawl	—N/a	1986	
Invader	Shoot 'em up	—N/a	1986	
Sōkoban Datte, Taihendesu!	Puzzle	—N/a	1986	
Deep Scanner	Shooter	—N/a	1986	
2001-Nen Chitei no Tabi	Action	—N/a	1986	
Ohanabatake de, Issho ni ne!	Arcade	—N/a	1986	
Scary Elevator Alien	Platform	—N/a	1986	
Aice-Alien Blocker	Action	—N/a	1986	
Full Power Olympic	Sports	Kōji Araki	1985	
The Present	Action	New-Rira	1985	
Black Jack	Cards	Raimu Raito	1985	
Target Shot	Shooter	Toshiaki Yoshioka	1985	
Paint Shop	Action	Kunimichi Kato	1985	
Pen Pen in Panic	Action	Yukiko Matsūra	1985	
Yūshirubeji	Puzzle	Hiroyuki Maruyama	1985	
Heaven and Hell	Action	Naoki Ariyama	1985	
Crisis Zone	Shoot 'em up	Tsukasa Takahashi	1985	
Orange Melon	Action	Mitsuken Takeuchi	1985	
Flight Mario	Action	Takayuki Narita	1985	
Cross Attack	Shoot 'em up	Yukiko Matsūra	1985	
Third	Puzzle	Naji	1985	
Super Fighter	Shoot 'em up	Magumentarō	1985	
Run Run Mario!!	Platform	Tone Tone	1985	
A Cave of Wind	Puzzle	Toshiaki Yoshioka	1985	
Fluffy Valley	Sports	Yasuyuki Yamada	1986	
Ball Panic	Action	Masayoshi Hosoda	1986	
Soccer Shooting Game	Sports	New-Rira	1986	
Galaxy Cleaning Squad	Action	Infinity	1986	
Ball Game	Action	Namukotto	1986	
Gester	Shooter	Gorochio	1986	
Space Raster	Shoot 'em up	Mitsuharu Ōkubo	1986	
Flight	Action	Akihiro Maruyama	1986	
Kupupu	Puzzle	Go Tanaka	1986	
Mu-Day	Shooter	Hiroaki Osawa	1986	
Treasure Hunt	Maze	Mr. Shin, Tone²	1986	
Penguin Pop	Action	Tsukasa Takahashi	1986	
Defend Ladies	Shooter	Masato Morifuji	1986	
To Ichi me Ichi Ningen	Maze	Gorochin	1986	
One-Two Step	Puzzle	Gorochin	1986	
Death Zone	Shoot 'em up	Arts Team	1986	
Color-Guessing Game	Puzzle	—N/a	1985	
Flag-Raising Game	Puzzle	—N/a	1985	
Fire Cannon	Shooter	—N/a	1985	
Star Ship	Simulation	—N/a	1986	
Mario's Mountain Climb	Action	—N/a	1986	
Moonbase	Shooter	—N/a	1985	
Reversal Puzzle	Puzzle	—N/a	1985	
Awa? Awawa......	Action	—N/a	1985	
Number Guessing Game	Puzzle	—N/a	1985	
Pen Pen Flag	Action	—N/a	1985	
Ha+Ne=Hane	Puzzle	—N/a	1985	
Tori	Action	—N/a	1985	
Mizusumashi no Bōken	Maze	—N/a	1985	
Fireball Ikedori Sakusen	Maze	—N/a	1985	
High Speed Whack-a-Mole	Action	—N/a	1985	
Fly & Crow	Action	—N/a	1985	
Defender	Shooter	—N/a	1985	
Mario no Bunshin no Jutsu	Puzzle	—N/a	1985	
Mario no Hashiri Habatobi	Sports	—N/a	1985	
Balloon Panic	Action	—N/a	1985	
Pickup	Puzzle	—N/a	1985	
Kībōdo no Haya Uchi	Puzzle	—N/a	1985	
Pen Pen Sora wo Tobu	Action	—N/a	1985	
Space Fighting	Shooter	—N/a	1985	
Fighting Lady	Action	—N/a	1985	
Fushigi no Mori no Picnic	Action	—N/a	1985	
Hae-Hae Karyokuryoku	Action	—N/a	1985	
Pound Ball	Action	—N/a	1985	
Bizarre Bulldozer	Action	—N/a	1985	
Knitpicker Fighter Fly	Action	—N/a	1985	
Starship Wars	Shooter	—N/a	1985	
Squash Game	Sports	—N/a	1985	
Nitanita Invader	Shooter	—N/a	1985	
Hop Ball	Action	—N/a	1985	
Original Game	Shooter	—N/a	1984	
Heart	Music	—N/a	1985	
Pen Pen Maze	Maze	—N/a	1985	
Mario World	Platform	—N/a	1985	
Starkiller	Shooter	—N/a	1985	
Spinner Panic	Action	—N/a	1984	
Pen Pen Big Track	Action	—N/a	1984	
Mario Land	Action	—N/a	1984	
Change-Change	Action	—N/a	1984	
Keyboard Speed Typing Game	Educational	—N/a	1985	
16 Puzzle Games	Puzzle	—N/a	1985	
Number Game	Puzzle	—N/a	1985	
Maze Escape Game	Maze	—N/a	1985	
Light Circle Game	Snake	—N/a	1985	
Fruit Panic	Action	Kimura-kun	1984	
Achilles vs Nitanita	Action	Kimura-kun	1984	
Squash	Sports	Noboru Izakaya	1984	
Crab Flag Relay	Action	Kazuyuki Nishiyama	1984	
Star Dust	Simulation	Hisanori Takeuchi	1985	
Dangerous Pen Pen!	Action	Taniyama Tomokazu	1985	
Mischievous Crow	Action	Aoba	1985	
War Game	Shoot 'em up	Junichi Kato	1985	
Jumpman	Action	Noboru Izakaya	1985	
Docking	Simulation	Goro Takahashi	1985	
Last Fight	Shooter	Noboru Izakaya	1985	
Heading Volleyball	Sports	Motohiko Miyazaki	1985	
Fighter Fly Land	Action	Toshiaki Muramoto	1985	
Trampoline Mario	Action	Shintaro Tanimoto	1985	
Diving Nitanita	Sports	Norio Yaguchi	1985	
Blue Coin	Puzzle	Noboru Izakaya	1985	
Lady's Aerial Flight	Action	Takayuki Marunaka	1985	
New Shirizumo	Sports	Takashi Ida	1985	
Penguin's Bar	Action	Suzuki Tsuyoshi	1985	
Battling 2	Action	Hyo!	1985	
Flies!	Shooter	Ei-kun	1986	
Dark	Platform	Goro Takahashi	1986	
Heading Volleyball 2	Sports	Motohiko Miyazaki	1986	
Marble Wars 2	Action	C-Lap	1986	
Star Dust II	Shooter	Hisanori Takeuchi	1986	
Kamegon Buster	Action	Hidetaka Nanbo	1986	
Otos	Action	Junichi Kato	1986	
Space Rocky II	Shooter	Toshiaki Muramoto	1986	
Fighting Mario	Action	Shuhei Inaoka	1986	
A Crab's Love Story	Action	Kazuma Furukawa	1986	
The Cloud Closest to Heaven	Platform	Cabbage-kun	1986	
Star Dust IV	Shoot 'em up	Hisanori Takeuchi	1986	
Ranger Helicopter	Action	Ikuo Kumakiri	1986	
Daruma-san ga Koronda	Action	Dodondodon Kato	1986	
Underground Tank	Action	Baifaman	1986	
Cosmos Fighter	Shooter	Shintaro Tanimoto	1986	
The Cloud Closest to Heaven 3	Platform	Cabbage-kun	1986	
Mario & Luige	Action	Junya Kuwana	1986	
Excite Minicar	Racing	Ikuo Kumakiri	1986	
Ellen's Fight	Action	Magical Blue Fancy	1986	
Battle & Rescue	Shooter	Hisanori Takeuchi	1986	
Hopping Soccer	Sports	Junichi Kato	1986	
Window Cleaning Panic	Action	Hidemi U.	1986	
Monster Cave	Dungeon crawl	Pegasus Soft	1986	
Ryo-chan's Adventure	Platform	Cabbage-kun	1986	
Ika	Action	Hisanori Takeuchi	1986	
Excalibur	Dungeon crawl	Norio Kitajima	1986	
Battling 3	Action	Hyo!	1986	
Cabe-kun's Adventures	Action	Cabbage-kun	1986	
Star Dust V	Shoot 'em up	Hisanori Takeuchi	1986	
Hopping Nita-Nita	Platform	I.M.O.	1986	
Space Battle	Shoot 'em up	Mappy, Dragon	1986	
Four Ladys	Action	Gokudon	1986	
Let's Go! Submarine	Action	Kazuaki Kojima	1986	
Fantasy Land	Action	Keiichi Sato	1986	
Star Dust VI	Shoot 'em up	Hisanori Takeuchi	1986	
Cross	Action	Kazunori	1987	
The Well of Alka	Action	Takanori Ishii	1987	
Pen Pen	Maze	Goemon	1987	
Sky Fighter	Shooter	Hand Made Soft	1987	
High Speed	Racing	Hisanori Takeuchi	1987	
Otochan's Idol	Action	Masao Akimoto, Kazumoto Abe	1987	
Jumper	Platform	Kazunori	1987	
2/12	Maze	Hisanori Takeuchi	1987	
Excalibur 2	Role-playing	Norio Kitajima	1987	
Crash Maze	Puzzle	Masao Akimoto	1987	
Save The World!	Action	Silly Love Soft	1987	
Fight On!	Platform	Akira Mito	1987	
Bridge Fight	Fighting	Masanori Takahashi	1987	
Pachinko	Casino	Akira Terai	1987	
Xesys-II	Shoot 'em up	Vaskarom	1987	
Volleyball	Sports	Mitocchi	1987	
The Bridge on the Battlefield	Artillery	Masao Akimoto	1987	
Karasudas!	Shoot 'em up	Hidemi U.	1987	
Ruru Moppe	Puzzle	Scramble La*ko	1987	
Space Barrier	Action	Vaskarom	1987	
The Treasure of Takudara	Dungeon crawl	C.A.T. Soft	1987	
Kikaikaikai	Action	Takashi Endo	1987	
Beep Magazine Battle for the Title	Action	Akira Terai	1987	
Mario and his Three Daughters	Platform	Mika Osawa	1987	
Basketball	Sports	Mitocchi	1987	
The Legend of Satan	Shoot 'em up	Shingo Yasue	1987	
Gunganji 3	Shoot 'em up	Matsug-chan	1987	
Kaijū Zadora	Action	Takoyaki	1987	
Danger Zone	Shoot 'em up	I.M.O.	1987	
Zoku Kikaikaikai	Action	Takashi Endo	1987	
Seven Bridge	Action	Matsuo Masaomi	1987	
F1 Grand Prix	Racing	Hyo!	1987	
Mario's Girl Hunt	Fishing	Akira Terai	1987	
Puzzle	Puzzle	Takoyaki	1987	
Kuzusankai	Action	Mitocchi	1987	
Celra	Shoot 'em up	Popit Soft	1987	
Penguin Fight	Action	Mr. X	1988	
Boomerang	Action	Akira Terai	1988	
Fisraduth: Castle of Tyramis	Action	C.A.T. Soft	1988	
The Return of Satan	Shoot 'em up	Shingo Yasue	1988	
1-Player Volleyball	Sports	Akira Terai	1988	
Diamond Dust	Action	Takashi Endo	1988	
Trampoline Panic	Action	Mitocchi	1988	
Alien Zenmetsu Sakusen	Shoot 'em up	Akihisa Nakamura	1988	
Home Loan	Action	Akira Terai	1988	
Ice Hockey	Sports	Jinrui Neko-ka	1988	
Soccer	Sports	Mitocchi	1988	
Head Attack	Action	Katsuya Sato	1988	
Battle Ball	Action	Hidehito Kiyokawa	1988	
Battle Robot	Action	Mappy, Dragon	1988	
Mai	Puzzle	Nishiyama	1988	
Menko	Puzzle	C3A16	1988	
Fudo Myoji Monogatari	Action	Takashi Endo	1988	
Taco-Taco Up	Action	Vaskarom	1988	
Penguin Soccer	Soccer	Takeo Yoshimura	1988	
Evil Castle	Action	Katsuya Sato	1988	
Pata Dragon	Action	Ryoga Sugawara	1988	
Jump Mario	Platform	Kazuki Takizawa	1988	
Achilles Spirit	Shoot 'em up	Akihisa Nakamura	1988	
Liforce	Shoot 'em up	Shingo Yasue	1988	
Family Basic V3 Magazine	Compilation	Hirataira/Hirata Soft	1988	
Itazura Karasu o Yattsukero!	Action	Mitocchi	1988	
Star Ship vs Mariones	Shooter	Shuji Nishimoto	1988	
Saishinei	Shooter	Usu-I	1988	
Gondola Panic	Action	Mitocchi	1988	
Aurora Islands	Platform	Takashi Endo	1988	
Cross Highway	Action	Junichi Taguchi	1988	
S-D-A-R	Shooter	Yukio Ichikawa	1988	
The Spirit of Satan	Shoot 'em up	Shingo Yasue	1988	
Jumping Attack	Action	Mitocchi	1988	
Family Basic V3 Magazine No. 2	Compilation	Hirataira/Hirata Soft	1988	
Beltech	Action	Vaskarom	1988	
Let Out	Puzzle	Hayase Shigenori	1989	
Kuzusankai 2	Action	Mitocchi	1989	
Catieni	Puzzle	BG Graphic	1989	
Jumping Attack 2	Action	Mitocchi	1989	
Mystery House	Platform	Junya Sakabe	1989	
Mario Super Sky Jump	Platform	Out of Memory	1989	
Tenkū ni Uku Dai Teikoku	Action	C.A.T. Soft	1989	
Space Wars	Shoot 'em up	Koichi Tamura	1989	
FC Whack-a-Mole	Action	Takoyaki	1989	
Dangerous Battle	Action	BG Graphic	1989	
Liforce II	Shoot 'em up	Shingo Yasue	1989	
Final Olympic	Sports	Out of Memory	1989	
Family Basic V3 Magazine No. 3	Compilation	Hirataira/Hirata Soft	1989	
The Monster's Tower	Action	Moai	1989	
Takashi no Deko Pin Fūunji RV	Action	Takashi Endo	1989	
Home Run King	Sports	Shinichi Fujimoto	1989	
Netoryas	Puzzle	Shunsuke Yoshida	1989	
Stop	Action	Mitocchi	1989	
Zacner	Shoot 'em up	Koichi Yoshida	1989	
Fuma Killer	Maze	Matsuo Masaomi	1989	
Fruit Pen Pen	Action	Mishima	1989	
Buchu Buchu	Action	Ruri-2	1989	
Kyūkyoku DEX	Shoot 'em up	Takashi Endo	1989	
Bound Space V2	Shooter	Ruri-2	1989	
Ping Pong	Sports	Bear Studio	1989	
Star Battling	Action	Shinichi Fujimoto	1989	
Again	Platform	Ruri-2	1989	
Hopyorutto	Action	Katsuya Sato	1989	
F-Type	Shoot 'em up	Shinkan Soft	1989	
Martian!?	Action	Katsuya Sato	1989	
Kettobasu Bunnaguru	Fighting	Shinichi Fujimoto	1989	
Kawagoe Panic	Action	Mizuko Buturihan Fukusuke	1989	
Star Period	Action	Ruri-2	1989	
Jet Battle	Action	NNI Pro	1989	
Final War	Shoot 'em up	Yuichi Uchijo	1989	
Panel Turn	Puzzle	CCI	1990	
Othello	Board game	Mappy	1990	
Metal Arms	Shoot 'em up	Shinkan Soft	1990	
Disorder Puzzle	Puzzle	Takashi Hayashizaki	1990	
Family Basic V3 Magazine No. 4	Compilation	Hirataira/Hirata Soft	1990	
Akkanaid II	Action	Shunsuke Yoshida	1990	
Exciting Arithmetic	Puzzle	Mr. Kaku	1990	
Perlin Wall	Action	Amul Jr.	1990	
Akujī Sōmaden	Action	J-Soft	1990	
F1 Racing	Racing	Shinichi Fujimoto	1990	
Fly	Action	Tomohide Nakamura	1990	
Auro Ran	Racing	Miyaji Suketaro	1990	
Utility Pole	Action	Tomohide Nakamura	1990	
Move Road	Racing	Hirata Soft	1990	
Badience	Shoot 'em up	Tomohide Nakamura	1990	
Dear Sandwich	Puzzle	Jungo Hirayama	1990	
Aim for Mario's Heart!	Action	Tomohide Nakamura	1990	
Water Panic	Shooter	Shinichi Fujimoto	1990	
Between	Puzzle	Tomohide Nakamura	1990	
Shadow Towering Inferno	Action	Tsuyoshi Ichinowata	1990	
Metalu! Itou	Shoot 'em up	Koichi Yoshida	1990	
1 Line Program x 3	Puzzle	Shinichi Fujimoto	1990	
Fiseam	Action	Tomohide Nakamura	1990	
There it is!! A 1 Line Program	Action	Hiroyuki Shimizu	1990	
Ebidishi	Shoot 'em up	Katsuya Sato	1990	
New Ball Alien	Shooter	Tomohide Nakamura	1990	
Act Hands	Puzzle	Jungo Hirayama	1991	
Fujitsu	Action	Crystal	1991	
Elemental World	Puzzle	Amul Jr.	1991	
Addris	Puzzle	Tomohide Nakamura	1991	
Fire Love	Action	Ruri-2	1991	
V5 Denden	Shoot 'em up	Koichi Yoshida	1991	
Patadragon: Haiiro no Shiro	Action	Mizuko Buturihan Fukusuke	1991	
Goal Goal!	Sports	Akira Terai	1991	
Red! Ariyama	Action	Koichi Yoshida	1991	
Bound Meteo	Shoot 'em up	Amul Jr.	1991	
Quarthello	Puzzle	Studio Crawl	1991	
Ayakaris	Puzzle	Katsuya Sato	1991	
Driving School: Basic Operations	Simulation	Akira Terai	1992	
Famibetic Dodge	Sports	Jungo Hirayama	1992	
Close Ten	Puzzle	Hadō Shōryūken	1992	
Driving School: Driver's License Exam	Simulation	Akira Terai	1992	
F	Racing	Hidekatsu Hotta	1992	
Vague Mine	Strategy	Amul Jr.	1992	
F1 Drivers	Racing	Amul Jr.	1992	
Ping Pong Star	Sports	Jungo Hirayama	1992	
Attack Rate	Shooter	Takashi Endo	1992	
The Ambition II	Strategy	Masahiro Urano	1992	
Bomb Break II	Action	Jungo Hirayama	1992	
King of Hayaoshi	Action	Shinichi Fujimoto	1993	
Act Fever	Puzzle	Jungo Hirayama	1993	
Numberis	Puzzle	Chan	1993	
Pon Nuki	Puzzle	Akira Terai	1993	
Zacner II	Shoot 'em up	Koichi Yoshida	1993	
Nuigulumi Dream	Puzzle	Jungo Hirayama	1993	
Kabunshō	Action	Akira Terai	1993	
Hime o Tasukeru Game	Action	Toyohide Tazawa	1993	
Wellside Play	Puzzle	Katsuya Sato	1993	
Shirakaba SOS	Action	Shinai New Room	1993	
Jumping Attack 3	Action	Mitocchi	1993	
Pachinko 2	Casino	Akira Terai	1993	
Ryūhyō-kan no Sangeki	Racing	Takashi Endo	1994	
Tobuyo	Board game	Akira Terai	1994	
Dr. Fukuwarai	Puzzle	Akira Terai	1994	
Futatabi Kawa Go e Panic	Action	Mizuko Buturihan Fukusuke	1994	
Kaidan	Puzzle	Akira Terai	1994	
Ping Pong	Sports	Akira Terai	1994	
Neppū-kan no Sangeki	Puzzle	Takashi Endo	1994	
Fukusuke no Gimon	Action	Mizuko Buturihan Fukusuke	1994	
Crane Game	Puzzle	Akira Terai	1994	
Aerial Trapeze	Action	Akira Terai	1994	
Fukugimo!	Action	Mizuko Buturihan Fukusuke	1994	
Ohoholand	Role-playing	Takashi Endo	1994	
Kawagoe Panic III	Action	Mizuko Buturihan Fukusuke	1995	
Tonderu! Achilles!	Action	Mizuko Buturihan Fukusuke	1995	
The Miraculous Fruit: Miracle Fruit	Maze	Mizuko Buturihan Fukusuke	1995	
Push! Push!	Puzzle	Minmin	1995	
Famibe Blast	Action	Kenji Hoshimoto	1995	
Family Last One	Puzzle	Kenji Hoshimoto	1995	
Starship Prototype	Shoot 'em up	Mizuko Buturihan Fukusuke	1995	
Apple Catcher	Puzzle	Tsutomu Soft	1995	
Steppoi	Puzzle	Takeo Shirai	1995	
Satellite Attack	Shooter	Mikio Kamazawa	1995	
Nichiyō Daiku no Tetsujin	Action	Kenji Hoshimoto	1995	
Famicom De Electone	Music	Kenji Hoshimoto	1995	
Turn	Board game	Studio-Crawl	1996	
Bomb Panic	Puzzle	Kenji Hoshimoto	1996	
Mario Flip 2	Cards	Luxcie 850	1996	
Quiz de Atama o Kitaero	Quiz game	Kenji Hoshimoto	1996	
Flak Game	Shooter	—N/a	1985	
Soccer Shoot Game	Sports	—N/a	1985	
Hamlet Game	Puzzle	—N/a	1985	
Jumpen Game	Sports	—N/a	1985	
Mario and Lady's Compatibility Fortune Telling	Non-game	—N/a	1985	
Protect the Land of Ice	Action	Toshiaki Yoshioka	1984	
Play Boy	Action	Tsukasa Takahashi	1985	
Famicom Clock	Non-game	Debu-sensei	1985	
Fufu Olympic	Sports	Debu-sensei	1985	
Car Jealousy	Action	Debu-sensei	1985	
Cosmo Plazma	Shooter	Tsukasa Takahashi	1985	
Project 15	Puzzle	Younger Soft	1985	
Star Fight	Shooter	Kazunari Tsubaki	1985	
F-1 Game	Racing	Tera	1985	
Achilles World	Action	Ranmaru, Family Computer Club	1985	
Wizalian	Dungeon crawl	Hiroshi Horikawa	1985	
Machine Talk	Non-game	—N/a	1985	
Bridge Across A Maze	Puzzle	Akihiro Maruyama	1986	
Pon Pon	Action	Samiadon	1986	
Taiman	Platform	Tsukasa Takahashi	1986	
Ice Land	Puzzle	Takeshi	1986	
Hito Fude Gaki	Maze	Takeshi	1986	
Block Hit	Action	Katsuhisa Takagi	1986	
To Ichi me Ichi Ningen Part 2	Maze	Gorochin	1986	
Sufuia	Puzzle	Takeshi	1987	
Crab Game	Action	—N/a	1984	
Typing Lesson	Educational	—N/a	1984	
Moonbase II	Simulation	—N/a	1984	
Starship	Shooter	—N/a	1984	
Arithmetic Fun	Educational	—N/a	1984	
Bounce BonBon	Action	—N/a	1984	
Daimajin Attack	Action	—N/a	1984	
Mario Shooter	Shooter	—N/a	1984	
Ping Pong 1	Sports	—N/a	1984	
Ping Pong 2	Sports	—N/a	1984	

== See also ==
- List of Family Computer games
- List of Famicom Disk System games
- Lists of video games
