= Digimon Battle Spirit =

2001 video game

- North American boxart
- Developer: Dimps
- Publisher: Bandai
- Series: Digimon
- Platforms: WonderSwan Color, Game Boy Advance
- Release: WonderSwan Color: JP: October 5, 2001; Game Boy Advance: NA: January 15, 2003; EU: September 5, 2003
- Genre: Fighting
- Modes: Single player, multiplayer

Digimon Battle Spirit is a fighting video game originally published by Bandai and developed by Dimps for the Japanese-only WonderSwan Color handheld system under the name Digimon Tamers: Battle Spirit (デジモンテイマーズ バトルスピリット, Dejimon Teimāzu Batoru Supiritto). It was later ported to Nintendo's Game Boy Advance for international releases in North America and Europe two years later.

The game features characters and Digimon that were included in the first three seasons of the animated series of the same name in a somewhat simplistic fighting scenario, and also has slightly arranged samples of the show's soundtrack.

== Gameplay ==
Agumon (left) and Renamon (right) in Digimon Battle Spirit

While structured very similarly to a conventional fighting game, Digimon Battle Spirit is much more like a barebones representation of the genre, mostly due to the limitations of the handhelds it was released on. Each character only has a handful of special attacks they can perform, with the two action buttons, A and B, allowing them to jump or attack respectively.

Each match is won by collecting small blue/red spheres called "D-Spirits". These are obtained by hitting your opponent, which causes a few of them to fly from their body and scatter across the battlefield. Different attacks can produce more spheres to fly out, and the player who has collected the most by the time the round ends wins. Each character can also digivolve into their most powerful or "Ultimate" (Mega) form by touching a flying Digimon named Calumon that appears every so often in each stage. This form grants them different, more powerful attacks for a limited time.

As the player advances through each stage, they will occasionally have to battle a character named Impmon. Winning or losing this encounter has no bearing on the actual game progression itself, and only serves to award more points. In the final stage, the player's Digimon must face off against Millenniummon himself.

The game can be played single player or multiplayer with two players. Cross play is available with Digimon Tamers: Battle Spirit Ver. 1.5.

== Plot ==
The Digital World, a computer-generated subspace that exists between all forms of digital devices, and home of the creatures known as "Digimon" is under attack by a malevolent and powerful force known as Millenniummon, who seeks to corrupt all of the data present in the world and modify said data to his own designs. In response, several Digimon and their human companions have set out to stop Millenniummon and his minions before any irreparable harm can be done. This must be accomplished in fighting video game style by finding and defeating as many opponents as possible.

== Characters ==
=== Playable characters ===
There are seven initial characters.

- Guilmon: A reptile Digimon who has Takato Matsuki as its tamer. It digivolves into Gallantmon. It appears in Puppetmon's Jungle as an opponent. Its attacks focus on its claws and fire breathing. Guilmon is the only character to be able to charge its attacks.
- Terriermon: A beast Digimon who has Henry Wong as its tamer. It digivolves into MegaGargomon. It appears in Toy Town as an opponent. Its attacks make use of its ears and control of the air. Terriermon is one of only two Digimon who can glide.
- Renamon: A beastkin Digimon who has Rika Nonak as its tamer. It digivolves into Sakuyamon. It appears in Shinto Temple as an opponent. Renamon uses a wide array of kicks, claw, and leaf arrows to fight its enemies.
- Veemon: A dragon Digimon who has Davis Motomiya as its tamer. It digivolves into Imperialdramon (Paladin Mode). It appears in Etemon's Desert as an opponent. Veemon is a close-combat expert who cannot attack at a distance.
- Wormmon: A larva Digimon who has Ken Ichijouji as its tamer. It digivolves into Imperialdramon (Fighter Mode). It appears in Digimon Emperor's Lair as an opponent. Its arsenal includes a whip, a stinger, silk, and a sharp shell. Wormmon is the only character who can climb walls.
- Agumon: Another reptile Digimon who has Taichi Kamiya as its tamer. It digivolves into WarGreymon. It appears in Cathedral Ruins as an opponent. The dinosaur uses its claws and fireballs to damage opponents.
- Sukamon: A mutant Digimon who does not have a tamer. It digivolves into Etemon. It appears in Frozen Wonderland as an opponent. Its attack relies on extreme speed and the help of its trusty friend Chuumon.

There are five unlockable characters.

- Agumon (Black): The third playable reptile Digimon and the second character who does not have a tamer. It digivolves into WarGreymon (Black). It is unlocked by completing the game with two initial Digimon. Its attack are the same as the original Agumon with the addition of a powerful bite instead of its basic claw attack.
- Lopmon: Another beast Digimon who has Willis as its tamer. It digivolves into Kerpymon. It is unlocked by completing the game with five initial Digimon. Like its twin Terriermon, it uses its ears to attack but can also fire ice projectiles. Lopmon is one of only two Digimon who can glide.
- Gabumon: The fourth reptile Digimon of the game who has Yamato Ishida as its tamer. It digivolves into Omnimon. It is unlocked with Agumon (Extra) by completing the game with all Digimon, Agumon (Black), and Lopmon. Its moveset utilizes fire breathing, punches, and its horn to combat opponents.
- Agumon (Extra): The final reptile Digimon of the game who does not have a tamer. It digivolves into Omnimon. It is unlocked with Gabumon by completing the game with all Digimon, Agumon (Black), and Lopmon. Its attacks are exactly the same as the initial agumon. However, Agumon (Extra) is the only character who has access to the float ability.
- Impmon: An evil Digimon who does not have a tamer. It is the only character who cannot Digivolve. It is unlocked by getting 300 or more points in one run while beating Impmon. It can randomly appear once in each run as an opponent in any of Puppetmon's Jungle, Shinto Temple, Digimon Emperor's Lair, Frozen Wonderland instead of the usual host. If faced as an opponent, Impmon receives three more moves. It can stop all stage hazards, attracts D-spirits, and wins in the case of a tie. This encounter often spells the end of a run, even for experienced players. Its abilities focus on powerful fire and shadow-based long range moves.

=== Non-player characters ===
There are nine non-player characters.

- Milleniummon: A composition Digimon who acts as the final boss of the game. It appears in the final stage. It is an enormous monster with two forms who moves by flying at high speeds. It is invulnerable to damage in one of its two forms and attracts D-spirits automatically. Milleniummon dominates its opponents with its mastery of electricity, fire, and time. The three moves it has are Dimension Destroyer, Time Unlimited, and Infinity Cannon.
- Calumon: An animal Digimon who cannot digivolve or attack. It allows Digivolution when touched. It appears in all stages. Calumon moves by flying.
- Betamon: An amphibian Digimon who walks on four legs and drops items. It appears in Toy Town. It has 2 health and moves by walking.
- Gotsumon: A rock Digimon who has powerful defensive abilities and drops items. It appears in Cathedral Ruins. It has 3 health and moves by rolling or walking.
- Numemon: A mollusk Digimon with a slug-like body who drops items. It appears in Etemon's Desert. It has 1 health and moves by burrowing.
- Mushroomon: A vegetation Digimon shaped like a tiny poisonous mushroom who drops items. It appears in Puppetmon's Jungle. It has 1 health and moves by walking.
- DemiDevimon: Another evil Digimon that looks like a bat and drops items. It appears in Shinto Temple. It has 1 health and moves by flying.
- Bakemon: A ghost Digimon covered in cloth who drops items. It appears in Digimon Emperor's Lair. It has 1 health and moves by flying.
- Penguinmon: An avian Digimon that looks like a penguin, lives in cold climates, and drops items. It appears in Frozen Wonderland. It has 1 health when sliding and 2 health when walking and moves by sliding on its belly, sliding on its back, or walking.

== Items ==
There are six items in the game.

- Baseball: Has a linear path when thrown. Does 1 damage. Does light knockback.
- Bowling Ball: Has a circular arc path when thrown. Does 2 damage. Does heavy knockback.
- Fire: Has a linear path when thrown. Does 2 damage. Gives the burn status.
- Electricity: Has a linear path when thrown. Does 2 damage. Gives the electric shock status.
- Gear: Has a linear path when thrown. Does no damage. Gives the disorientation status.
- Timer: Has a linear path when thrown. Does no damage. Gives the paralysis status.

== Reception ==
Reception

Aggregate score
Aggregator	Score
Metacritic	60/100

Review scores
Publication	Score
GamePro	12.5/20
GameZone	7/10
IGN	6.5/10
Nintendo Power	17/25

Digimon Battle Spirit received "mixed or average" reviews according to review aggregator Metacritic.

IGN selected Digimon Battle Spirit as the runner-up for the January 2003 "GBA Game of the Month" award, behind Crash Bandicoot 2: N-Tranced.

== See also ==
- Digimon Tamers: Battle Spirit Ver. 1.5
- Digimon Battle Spirit 2
