= List of WonderSwan games =

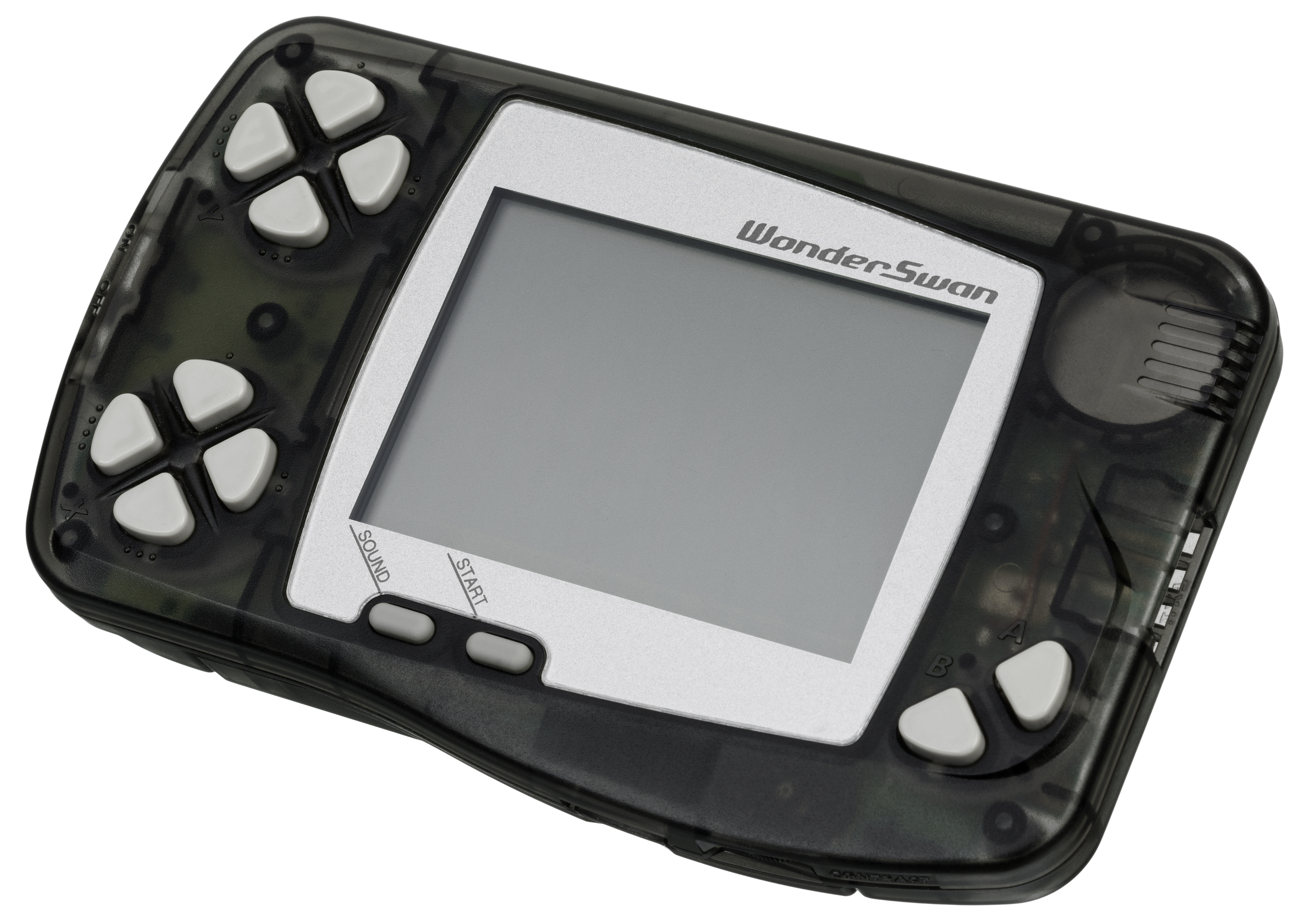
The original monochrome WonderSwan

This is a list of games for the Bandai WonderSwan handheld video game system, organized alphabetically by name, with the catalog number where known. The system and its games were not released outside of Japan. There are 109 games released on the original Wonderswan and they are compatible with every version of Wonderswan.

Title	Developer	Publisher	Release dates
Anchorz Field	Sammy Corporation	Sammy Corporation	June 24, 1999
Armored Unit	Sammy Corporation	Sammy Corporation	November 18, 1999
Bakusou Dekotora Densetsu for WonderSwan	KID	Kaga Tech	December 29, 1999
Beatmania for WonderSwan	Konami	Konami	April 28, 1999
Buffers Evolution	Koto Laboratory	Bandai	December 9, 1999
Cardcaptor Sakura: Sakura to Fushigi na Clow Card	SIMS Co., Ltd.	Bandai	December 2, 1999
Chaos Gear ~Michibika reshi mono~	Lay-Up	Bandai	June 10, 1999
Chocobo no Fushigi na Dungeon for WonderSwan	TOSE	Bandai	March 4, 1999
Chō Aniki: Otoko No Tamafuda	CP.BRAiN	Bandai	February 10, 2000
Chou Denki Card Battle "Yōfu Makai" Kikuchi Hideyuki	Kobunsha	Kobunsha	December 16, 1999
Clock Tower for WonderSwan	Human Entertainment	Kaga Tech	December 9, 1999
Crazy Climber	Nichibutsu	Nichibutsu	July 29, 1999
Densha de Go!	Taito	Taito	March 4, 1999
Densha de Go! 2	Taito	Cyber Front	October 7, 1999
Digimon Adventure: Anode Tamer	SIMS Co., Ltd.	Bandai	March 4, 1999
Digimon Adventure: Cathode Tamer	SIMS Co., Ltd.	Bandai	January 20, 2000
Digimon Adventure 02: Tag Tamers	SIMS Co., Ltd.	Bandai	August 3, 2000
Digital Monster Ver.WonderSwan	SIMS Co., Ltd.	Bandai	March 25, 1999
Digital Partner	Bandai	Bandai	May 25, 2000
Dokodemo Hamster	Beck	Beck	January 6, 2000
D's Garage21 Kōbo Game: Tane o maku tori	Avit, Inc.	Bandai	December 22, 1999
Engacho! for WonderSwan	Nihon Application	Nihon Application	October 28, 1999
Fever Sankyo Koushiki Pachinko Simulation for WonderSwan	Beck	Beck	March 4, 1999
Final Lap 2000	Soft Machine	Bandai	March 23, 2000
Fire Pro Wrestling for WonderSwan	S-Plan Corporation	Kaga Tech	August 31, 2000
Fishing Freaks: Bass Rise for Wonder Swan	Media Entertainment inc.	Beck	February 24, 2000
From the TV Animation:One Piece ~Mezase Kaizokuou!~	Soft Machine	Bandai	July 19, 2000
Ganso JaJaMaru-kun	Jaleco	Jaleco	April 15, 1999
Glocal Hexcite	Success	Success	June 29, 2000
Gomokunarabe & Reversi Tōryūmon	Sammy Corporation	Sammy Corporation	January 13, 2000
Gorakuou Tango!	Mebius	Mebius	April 1, 1999
Gunpey	Koto Laboratory	Bandai	March 4, 1999
Hanafuda Shiyouyo	Success	Success	February 17, 2000
Harobots	Sunrise Interactive	Sunrise Interactive	October 7, 1999
Hunter × Hunter: Ishi o Tsugu Mono	Yoshidayama-Workshop Co., Ltd	Bandai	June 1, 2000
Kakutō Ryōri Densetsu: Bistro Recipe -Wonder Battle Hen-	Banpresto	Banpresto	September 30, 1999
Kaze no Klonoa: Moonlight Museum	Namco	Bandai	May 20, 1999
Keiba Yosō Shien Soft: Yosō Shinkaron	Beck	Beck	September 14, 1999
Kiss Yori... -Seaside Serenade-	KID	KID	December 2, 1999
Kosodate Quiz Dokodemo My Angel	Namco	Bandai	April 15, 1999
Kyousouba Ikusei Simulation: Keiba	Beck	Beck	November 18, 1999
Langrisser Millennium WS: The Last Century	CP.BRAiN	Bandai	March 1, 2000
Last Stand	Soft Machine	Bandai	May 27, 1999
Lode Runner for WonderSwan	Aisystem Tokyo	Banpresto	April 20, 2000
Macross: True Love Song	Lay-Up	Lay-Up	March 23, 2000
Magical Drop for WonderSwan	Gai Brain Y K	Data East	October 14, 1999
Mahjong Tōryūmon	Chat Noir	Sammy Corporation	March 11, 1999
Makaimura for WonderSwan	Team OX (Marubatsu-gumi, Ltd)	Bandai	July 22, 1999
Medarot Perfect Edition (Kabuto Version)	Natsume Co., Ltd.	Imagineer	May 4, 1999
Medarot Perfect Edition (Kuwagata Version)	Natsume Co., Ltd.	Imagineer	May 4, 1999
Meitantei Conan: Majutsushi No Chousenjou	Tomcat System	Bandai	August 5, 1999
Meitantei Conan: Nishi No Meitantei Saidai No Kiki!?	Tomcat System	Bandai	July 27, 2000
Metakomi Therapy: Nee Kiite!	Media Entertainment	Media Entertainment	March 1, 2000
Mingle Magnet	HAL Corporation	HAL Corporation	November 2, 1999
Mobile Suit Gundam MSVS	SIMS Co., Ltd.	Bandai	August 26, 1999
Moero!! Pro Yakyuu Rookies	TOSE	Jaleco	March 30, 2000
Morita Shogi for WonderSwan	Yuki Enterprise	Yuki Enterprise	December 22, 1999
Nazo-Oh Pocket	Avit, Inc.	Bandai	November 18, 1999
Neon Genesis Evangelion: Shito Ikusei	Gainax	Bandai	July 22, 1999
Nice On	Aisystem Tokyo	Sammy Corporation	April 8, 1999
Nihon Pro Mahjong Renmei Kōnin Tetsuman	Chat Noir / Naxart	Kaga Tech	July 15, 1999
Nobunaga no Yabō for WonderSwan	Koei	Koei	March 11, 1999
O-Chan no Oekaki Logic	Santaclaus	Sunsoft	January 6, 2000
Pocket Fighter	Soft Machine	Bandai	April 6, 2000
Pro Mahjong Kyoku for WonderSwan	Athena	Athena	October 7, 1999
Puyo Puyo 2	Compile	Bandai	March 11, 1999
Puzzle Bobble	Yoshidayama-Workshop Co., Ltd	Sunsoft	July 1, 1999
Rainbow Islands: Putty's Party	Digitalware	Megahouse	June 29, 2000
Ring: Infinity	Kadokawa Shoten	Kadokawa Shoten	August 10, 2000
Robot Works	Bandai	Bandai	August 4, 1999
Rockman & Forte Mirai kara no Chōsensha	Layup Co., Ltd.	Bandai	March 4, 1999
Sangokushi for WonderSwan	Koei	Koei	April 1, 1999
Sangokushi II	Koei	Koei	April 6, 2000
SD Gundam: Emotional Jam	Tom Create Co., Ltd.	Bandai	May 27, 1999
SD Gundam: Gashapon Senki -Episode One-	Graphic Research Co., Ltd	Bandai	December 29, 1999
SD Gundam: G Generation Gather Beat	Banpresto	Banpresto	July 13, 2000
Senkaiden: TV Animation Senkaiden Houshin Engi Yori	Graphic Research Co., Ltd	Bandai	February 24, 2000
Sen-Know Millennium	Kouyousha Ltd	Bandai	March 16, 2000
Shanghai Pocket	Sunsoft	Sunsoft	April 1, 1999
Shin Nihon Pro Wrestling: Tōkon Retsuden	TOSE	Tomy	March 4, 1999
Shōgi Tōryūmon	Sammy Corporation	Sammy Corporation	October 28, 1999
Side Pocket for WonderSwan	Data East	Data East	November 25, 1999
Slither Link	Tomcat System	Bandai	April 20, 2000
Soccer Yarou!: Challenge the World	Coconuts Japan	Coconuts Japan	August 12, 1999
Sotsugyō for WonderSwan	Imageworks	Bandai	December 16, 1999
Space Invaders	Taito	Sunsoft	May 13, 1999
Super Robot Taisen Compact	TOSE	Banpresto	April 28, 1999
Super Robot Taisen Compact 2 Dai1bu: Chijō Hadō Hen	TOSE	Banpresto	March 30, 2000
Super Robot Taisen Compact 2 Dai2bu: Uchuu Gekishin Hen	TOSE	Banpresto	June 29, 2000
Super Robot Taisen Compact 2 Dai3bu: Ginga Kessen-hen	TOSE	Banpresto	January 18, 2001
Taikyoku Igo Heisei Kiin	Success	Success	February 24, 2000
Tanjo: Debut for WonderSwan	Imageworks	Bandai	February 24, 2000
Tarepanda no Gunpey	Koto Laboratory	Bandai	December 9, 1999
Tekken Card Challenge	Namco	Bandai	June 17, 1999
Terrors	Megas	Bandai	August 5, 1999
Tetsujin 28-go	Megahouse	Megahouse	December 22, 1999
Time Bokan Series: Bokan Densetsu: Buta mo Odaterya Doronboo	Alpha Unit	Banpresto	April 27, 2000
Tokyo Majin Gakuen: Fuju Hōroku	Shout! Design Works	Asmik Ace	October 12, 2000
Trump Collection: Bottom Up Teki Trump Seikatsu	Bottom Up	Bottom Up	July 1, 1999
Trump Collection 2: Bottom Up Teki Sekai Isshuu no Tabi	Bottom Up	Bottom Up	September 28, 2000
Turntablist: DJ Battle	Vestax	Bandai	November 25, 1999
Umitsuri ni ikou!	Coconuts Japan	Coconuts Japan	April 1, 1999
Uzumaki: Denshi Kaiki Hen	Omega Micott	Omega Micott	February 3, 2000
Uzumaki: Noroi Simulation	Omega Micott	Omega Micott	March 4, 2000
Vaitz Blade	Tom Create Co., Ltd.	Bandai	June 24, 1999
Wasabi Produce - Street Dancer	FortyFive	Bandai	April 27, 2000
Wonder Stadium	TOSE	Bandai	March 11, 1999
Wonder Stadium '99	Namco	Bandai	September 30, 1999
WonderSwan Handy Sonar	Bandai	Bandai	May 13, 1999
