= Digimon Tamers: Battle Spirit Ver. 1.5 =

2002 video game

- Developer: Dimps
- Publisher: Bandai
- Series: Digimon
- Platform: WonderSwan Color
- Release: JP: April 27, 2002
- Genre: Fighting
- Modes: Single player, Multiplayer

Digimon Tamers: Battle Spirit Ver. 1.5 (Japanese: デジモンテイマーズ バトルスピリット Ver.1.5, Hepburn: Dejimon Teimaazu Batoru Supiritto Ver. 1.5) is a fighting game developed and published by Bandai. It was released exclusively in Japan for the WonderSwan Color handheld console on 27 April 2002. It is an expansion to Digimon Tamers: Battle Spirit (released in the United States and Europe as Digimon Battle Spirit) and contains many new features and characters. Unlike its predecessor or sequel, Digimon Battle Spirit 2, this game did not receive a Game Boy Advance port.

== Gameplay ==
Digimon Tamers: Battle Spirit Ver. 1.5 is a platform fighter.

Digimon Battle Spirit and Digimon Tamers: Battle Spirit Ver. 1.5 are available for multiplayer crossplay both in person and online.

=== Opening ===
Digimon Tamers: Battle Spirit Ver. 1.5 had a similar opening to the original game, although lengthened to contain the expanded roster (although BlackAgumon and Extra Agumon were not revealed. A shadowed Beelzemon Blast Mode is shown along with Impmon and Milleniummon)

The final scene of the opening is randomly picked. The following duels could be seen at the end:

BlackWarGreymon vs. WarGreymon

MegaGargomon vs. Cherubimon

Gallantmon vs. Omnimon

Seraphimon vs. Ophanimon

Gallantmon Crimson Mode vs. Beelzemon Blast Mode

=== Story line ===
By beating the game on Normal difficulty or higher without losing, the player got a chance to battle ZeedMillenniummon as a second "final boss".

=== Stages ===
Three new levels were added in Digimon Tamers: Battle Spirit Ver. 1.5.

A Locomon level, was included as Patamon's level. The Train had two vents on either side of the level which worked similar to the trampoline in Terriermon's level. During the match, the train passes through a modern, unnamed town. DemiDevimon are constantly flying above the fighters.

A waterfall level was included as Gatomon's level. The Digimon fight beside and behind the waterfall, with bushes here and there on the sides. Makuramon can occasionally be seen in the bushes, and Gotsumon occasionally roll down the mountain. This is the only vertical level in the Digimon: Battle Spirit series.

Instead of randomly interrupting a fight, Impmon received his own stage, which appears to be loosely based on the net from the Second Digimon Movie. Television screens of Impmon line both sides of the level, and the entire stage has an odd feel to it. The level is vertically symmetrical; you can see a floor above you when you're on the highest platform. The suction effect, which draws loose data to Impmon, is automatically on.

=== Items ===
There are six items available in the game:

- Baseball
- Shot put ball
- Fire ball
- Electric ball
- Gear
- Clock

== Characters ==
=== Playable characters ===
All of the original characters, including the unlockable Digimon, from Digimon Tamers: Battle Spirit were included as playable characters from the start, with the exception of Impmon. In addition, Patamon and Gatomon were added, with Seraphimon and Ophanimon as their Digivolutions, respectively.

In addition, there were two unlockable Digimon; An Extra Guilmon (who is unlocked by obtaining the "ultimate*" level tag in single player mode) who, like the Extra Agumon that could Digivolve into Omnimon, Digivolved into Gallantmon Crimson Mode, and the returning Impmon (who is unlocked by obtaining the "champion*" level tag in single player mode), with Beelzemon Blast Mode as a new Digivolution.

This game marks the first ever appearance of Extra Guilmon.

Digimon Battle Spirit and Digimon Battle Spirit 1.5 are compatible for multiplayer crossplay.

Digimon	Digivolution	Availability in Battle Spirit	Availability in Battle Spirit 1.5
Guilmon	Gallantmon	Starter	Starter
Terriermon	MegaGargomon	Starter	Starter
Renamon	Sakuyamon	Starter	Starter
Veemon	Imperialdramon Paladin Mode	Starter	Starter
Wormmon	Imperialdramon Fighter Mode	Starter	Starter
Agumon	WarGreymon	Starter	Starter
Sukamon	Etemon	Starter	Starter
BlackAgumon (Note: Named Agumon in game)	BlackWarGreymon	Unlockable	Starter
Lopmon	Cherubimon (Evil)	Unlockable	Starter
Gabumon	Omnimon	Unlockable	Starter
ExtraAgumon (Note: Named Agumon in game)	Omnimon	Unlockable	Starter
Patamon	Seraphimon	Not Available	Starter
Gatomon	Ophanimon	Not Available	Starter
Impmon	None/Beelzemon Blast Mode (Note: No evolution in Battle Spirit 1 but evolves in Battle Spirit 1.5)	Unlockable	Unlockable
ExtraGuilmon (Note: Named Guilmon in game)	Gallantmon Crimson Mode	Not Available	Unlockable

=== Non-playable characters ===
Characters	Type	Appearance
Calumon	Digimon	Every stage as a neutral Digimon that causes the first Digimon to touch it to Digivolve
Betamon	Digimon	Toytown
Gotsumon	Digimon	Cathedral Ruins and Pichi Pichi Falls
Numemon	Digimon	Etemon's Desert
DemiDevimon	Digimon	Shinto Temple, Locomontion, and Irritation Room
Mushroomon	Digimon	Puppetmon's Jungle
Bakemon	Digimon	Digimon Emperor's Lair
Penguinmon	Digimon	Frozen Wonderland
Millenniummon	Digimon	Final boss in Final Battle
ZeedMillenniummon	Digimon	Secret second final boss in Secret Final Battle
Locomon	Digimon	Part of the stage in Locomontion
Chuumon	Digimon	On the back of Sukamon and on the character selection screen
Takato Matsuki	Tamer	Character selection screen
Henry Wong	Tamer	Character selection screen
Rika Nonaka	Tamer	Character selection screen
Davis Motomiya	Tamer	Character selection screen
Ken Ichijouji	Tamer	Character selection screen
Taichi "Tai" Kamiya	Tamer	Character selection screen
Willis Gladstone	Tamer	Character selection screen
Yamato "Matt" Ishida	Tamer	Character selection screen
Takeru "T.K." Takaishi	Tamer	Character selection screen
Kari Kamiya	Tamer	Character selection screen

== Development ==
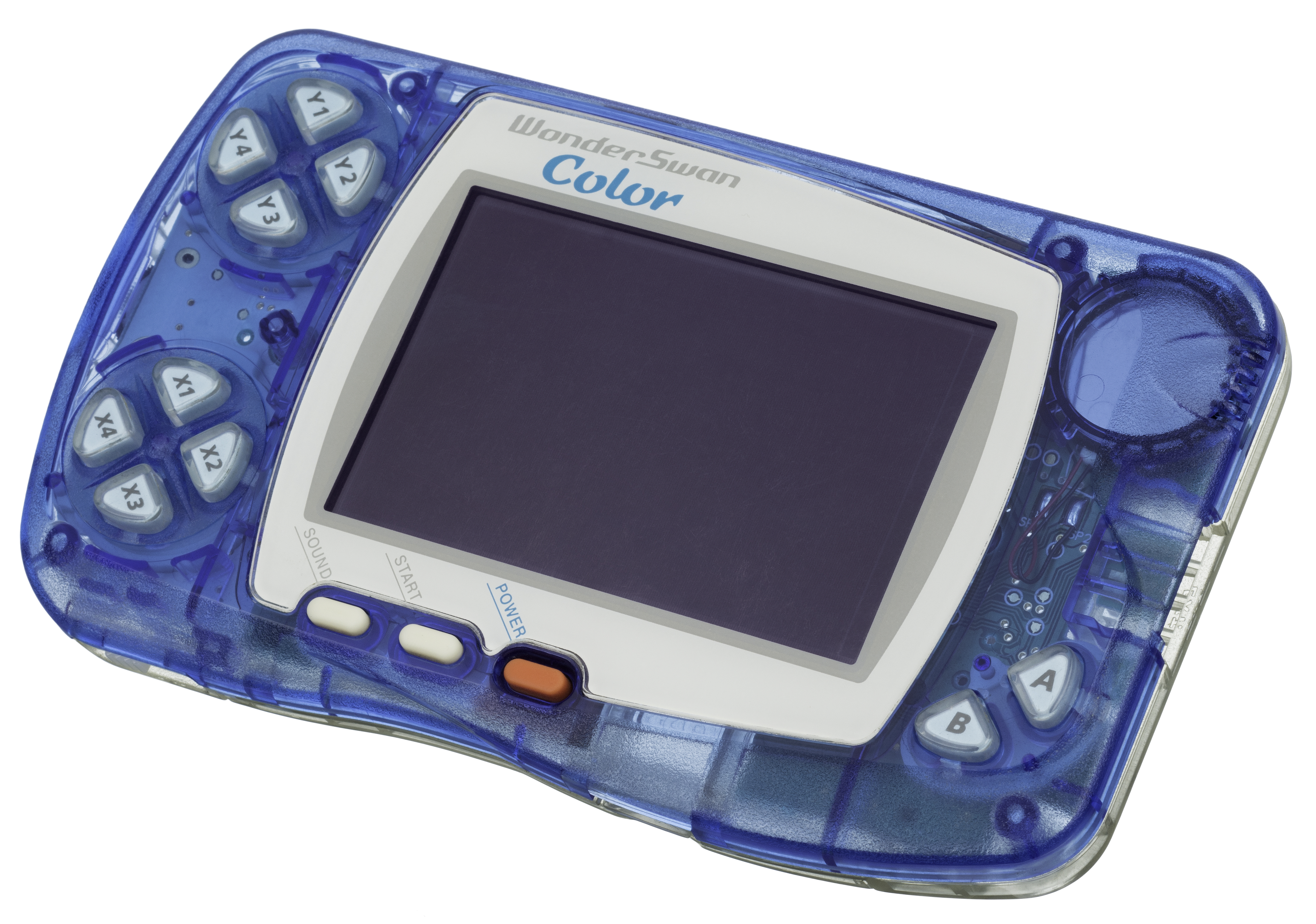
Wonderswan Color: the console Digimon Tamers: Battle Spirit Ver. 1.5 was exclusively released to

Digimon Tamers: Battle Spirit Ver. 1.5 is the sequel to Digimon Battle Spirit, which released a year prior on 6 October 2001. It contains everything the previous version contains, along with some added characters, an extended "storyline", and several other bonuses.

Unlike its prequel Digimon Battle Spirit and its sequel Digimon Battle Spirit 2 that received Game Boy Advance ports, Digimon Tamers: Battle Spirit Ver. 1.5 was solely released on the WonderSwan Color.

== Reception ==
The game received an average rating of 8.2/10 from players.

IGN writers Lucas M. Thomas and Craig Harrist listed 1.5 as one of the games they would most like to see appear on the DSiWare service for the Nintendo DSi. They claimed that "it would still be interesting to get this game on our DSi systems through digital download -- to play for fun, but also because of its place in industry history", referring to its status as one of the final games for the WonderSwan Color.

== See also ==
- Digimon Battle Spirit
- Digimon Battle Spirit 2
- Digimon
