= Judgement Silversword =

2001 video game

- Developer: Qute
- Publisher: Qute
- Platforms: WonderSwan Color, Windows
- Release: JP: 2001
- Genre: Vertical-scrolling shooter
- Mode: Single-player

Judgement Silversword (Note: Japanese: ジャッジメント シルバーソード, Hepburn: Jajjimento Shirubāsōdo) is a vertical-scrolling shooter video game developed and published for the WonderSwan Color by Qute.

== Gameplay ==
Judgement Silversword is a vertical-scrolling shooter game.

== Development ==
Judgement Silversword was created by independent Japanese designer "M-KAI". It was programmed using the WonderWitch, a software development kit produced by Qute that allowed consumers to produce homebrew software for the WonderSwan hardware family using the C programming language. To promote the kit's release, Qute held a contest where programmers had to use it to make a game for the system, the winners having their games published as official releases. Judgement Silversword was one of the winning games, alongside M-KAI's sister project Cardinal Sins, both of which Qute published in Japan. Development lasted roughly a month and a half. The game is believed to be inspired by Treasure's 1998 arcade game Radiant Silvergun.

M-KAI released Judgement Silversword as a freeware demo on his personal website in 2001. The retail version was released by Qute on February 2, 2004, with the subtitle Rebirth Edition due to Bandai discontinuing the WonderSwan family a year prior, Qute produced a limited print run of 500 copies, making it one of the rarest WonderSwan games released and commanding high prices in the second hand market. The 2011 Xbox 360 game Eschatos includes both Judgement Silversword and Cardinal Sins as extras. The original was digitally re-released for Windows via Steam in 2018, under the title Judgement Silversword - Resurrection.

== Reception ==
Reception

Review score
| Publication | Score |
|---|---|
| Pocket Gamer | 4/5 |

Copies sold out within just a few hours of being made available, leading to Qute reissuing it due to fan demand. French publication Pocket Gamer said that the game justified the purchase of the console, praising its colorful, detailed visuals, originality and fast-paced gameplay. They also liked the game's lack of slowdown and smooth sprite animation, alongside its various different difficulty options. In retrospect, Hardcore Gamer said that the large amount of levels and impressive graphical effects made Judgement Silversword a "technologic marvel" for the WonderSwan Color. Retro Gamer had a similar response, being impressed with the game's colorful visuals, intense gameplay and the ability to save high scores, adding that it was a good alternative to Radiant Silvergun. IGN expressed interest in the game being ported to the Nintendo DSi, saying that it could help establish a certain amount of quality for similar games available for both the DSi and the Wii Virtual Console.
