= Digimon Battle Spirit 2 =

2002 video game

- North American box art
- Developer: Dimps
- Publisher: Bandai
- Series: Digimon
- Platforms: WonderSwan Color (Japan); Game Boy Advance (Worldwide)
- Release: WonderSwan Color: JP: December 7, 2002; Game Boy Advance: NA: September 24, 2003; EU: August 27, 2004
- Genre: Fighting
- Modes: Single player, Multiplayer

Digimon Battle Spirit 2 is a fighting video game released for WonderSwan Color in 2002 and Game Boy Advance in 2004. It was developed by Dimps and published by Bandai based on the fourth season of the Digimon anime, Digimon Frontier. It was originally released in Japan for the WonderSwan Color handheld in December 2002 with the title Digimon Frontier: Battle Spirit (デジモンフロンティア バトルスピリット, Batoru Supiritto Dejimon Furontia). It was later ported to the Game Boy Advance for the Western market, released in North America in September 2003, and Europe in August 2004.

== Gameplay ==
This is a battle game between Human Spirit Digimon. Unlike most fighting games, the winner is not determined by having the most health, but the most blue or red "D-Spirits", which are released whenever the player strikes an opponent. When the player has damaged the opponent enough to fill the gauge at the top, the character's Beast Spirit is activated whenever they attack, allowing them to temporarily digivolve to a higher level, and attack with greater force. Also, yellow diamonds are released during Beast Spirit attacks, and filling the diamond gauge enables the player to momentarily warp digivolve to Ancient Level and fire a powerful attack, before returning to normal (this depletes the diamond gauge to zero). Once all of the Human Spirit Digimon are defeated, the player must then defeat Cherubimon. Cherubimon's name is Kerpymon in this game.

There is also a mini-game, where Digimon are used like marbles, and are fired at other Digimon on the board to knock them out of the arena.

== Plot ==
The plot follows Digimon Frontier. Several children receive messages on their cell phones asking them if they want their lives to change; some accept and some decline. Six children who accepted are summoned to the Digital World where they receive the ability to become Digimon and fight to end Cherubimon's reign of terror.

== Reception ==
Reception

Aggregate score
Aggregator	Score
Metacritic	63/100

Review score
Publication	Score
IGN	7/10

Digimon Battle Spirit 2 received "mixed or average reviews" according to the review aggregator Metacritic.

== See also ==
- Digimon Battle Spirit
- Digimon Tamers: Battle Spirit Ver. 1.5
