= Digimon Adventure: Anode/Cathode Tamer =

- Developer: Bandai
- Publisher: Bandai
- Series: Digimon
- Platforms: WonderSwan, WonderSwan Color
- Release: JP: December 15, 1999 (Anode Tamer); JP: January 20, 2000 (Cathode Tamer); HKG: September 18, 2001 (Veedramon version)
- Genre: Tactical role-playing
- Mode: Single player

Digimon: Anode/Cathode Tamer is one of two Digimon WonderSwan games (and one of the very few WonderSwan Color games) that are available in English. It combines two separate Japanese games, Digimon Adventure: Anode Tamer (デジモンアドベンチャー アノードテイマー), and Digimon Adventure: Cathode Tamer (デジモンアドベンチャー カソードテイマー), into one. The game was distributed by Bandai Asia and targeted mostly at Hong Kong and possibly other English-speaking Asian markets. The name is derived from the two different electrodes anode and cathode.

== Plot ==
Ryo is a boy roughly the same age as the older DigiDestined, which is about 11. He lives with his parents in a comfortable two-story house (hinting that Ryo's family is at least well-off due to high house prices in much of Japan and the fact that Ryo got a laptop for Christmas). On December 31, 1999, while chatting online a blackout occurs and Ryo's mother asks him to check the fuse-box. Before he can do so, however, a voice calls out to him from his computer, which is displaying a machine he's never seen before. The voice pleads to him to touch the device, which Ryo does.

Agumon attempts to wake Ryo. Anode/Cathode Tamer is one of the few WonderSwan Color games in English.

The next thing he knows, he's suddenly in the middle of a forest and confronted by Agumon, Tai's Digimon partner. After Agumon explains that Ryo was summoned because a powerful evil Digimon called Millenniummon captured the DigiDestined, then warped the very essence of time and resurrected previously defeated evil Digimon such as Devimon and Myotismon, Ryo quite understandably finds it all hard to believe and thinks he's having a nightmare from too many video games.

He quickly realizes he has no choice but to help, however, and thus begins his quest to rescue the DigiDestined and defeat Millenniumon. Along the way, he befriends a number of Digimon allied to the DigiDestined, including Leomon, Andromon, Piximon and many others. He also encounters villains previously defeated by the Chosen Children beginning with Devimon, then Etemon, Myotismon and the Dark Master Piedmon before confronting Milleniumon. (Depending on which game, he takes on the form of one of his two components, either Machinedramon or Kimeramon). After a fierce battle, Ryo and his Digimon comrades are able to vanquish the villain and rescue Tai, the last of the DigiDestined being held prisoner. His task done, Ryo bids his new friends a tearful farewell and returns home, where his parents note he seems to have grown up a bit.
