= Kosodate Quiz: My Angel =

Video game series

- Developer: Namco
- Publisher: Namco
- Platforms: Arcade, PlayStation
- First release: Kosodate Quiz: My Angel; 1996
- Latest release: Unō no Tatsujin: Hirameki Kosodate My Angel; 2006

Kosodate Quiz: My Angel (Note: Japanese: 子育てクイズマイエンジェル; lit. 'Parenting Quiz: My Angel') is a coming-of-age quiz video game series developed and published by Namco. The first game in the series, Kosodate Quiz: My Angel, was released in 1996 on arcade and received a port on the PlayStation a year later. The latest release, Uno no Tatsujin: Hirameki Kosodate My Angel, was released for the Nintendo DS in 2006.

== Gameplay ==
The player, represented in the game as a mother and a father, must successfully answer questions in order to raise their daughter's age from 0 to 25 years old. Each round has a question with four selectable answers, and if the player answers the question correctly, the player's "child support expenses" funds are raised, and the player can earn extra funds by correctly answering the target number of questions without missing. When all questions in a stage have been answered, the player will move on to the next. If the question is answered incorrectly, then the player's life meter will deplete; and if the life meter is empty, the game will be over. When a stage is cleared, an event will take place, and are based on the daughter's personality which are based on how well the player has done on the previous stage. The personalities include "Gentle", "Sexy", "Cult" and "Cheerful".

In addition to normal stages, a "test stage" can occur, which will depend if the player's daughter will enter kindergarten, elementary school, middle school, high school, vocational school and university. The player will need to answer a certain amount of questions correctly in order to apply, and the amount needed will increase in later test stages. When the player's daughter has reached the age of 25, a final "extra stage" will occur; the player will need to earn 6,000 yen in order to get the best ending.

== Sequels ==
- Kosodate Quiz: My Angel 2 (1997)
- Kosodate Quiz: My Angel 3: My Little Pet (1998)
- Derby Quiz: My Dream Horse (1998) - Spin-off title
- Kosodate Quiz: More My Angel (1999)
- Kosodate Quiz Everywhere: My Angel (1999)
- Unō no Tatsujin: Hirameki Kosodate My Angel (2006)
