= Family BASIC =

1984 console cartridge for programming

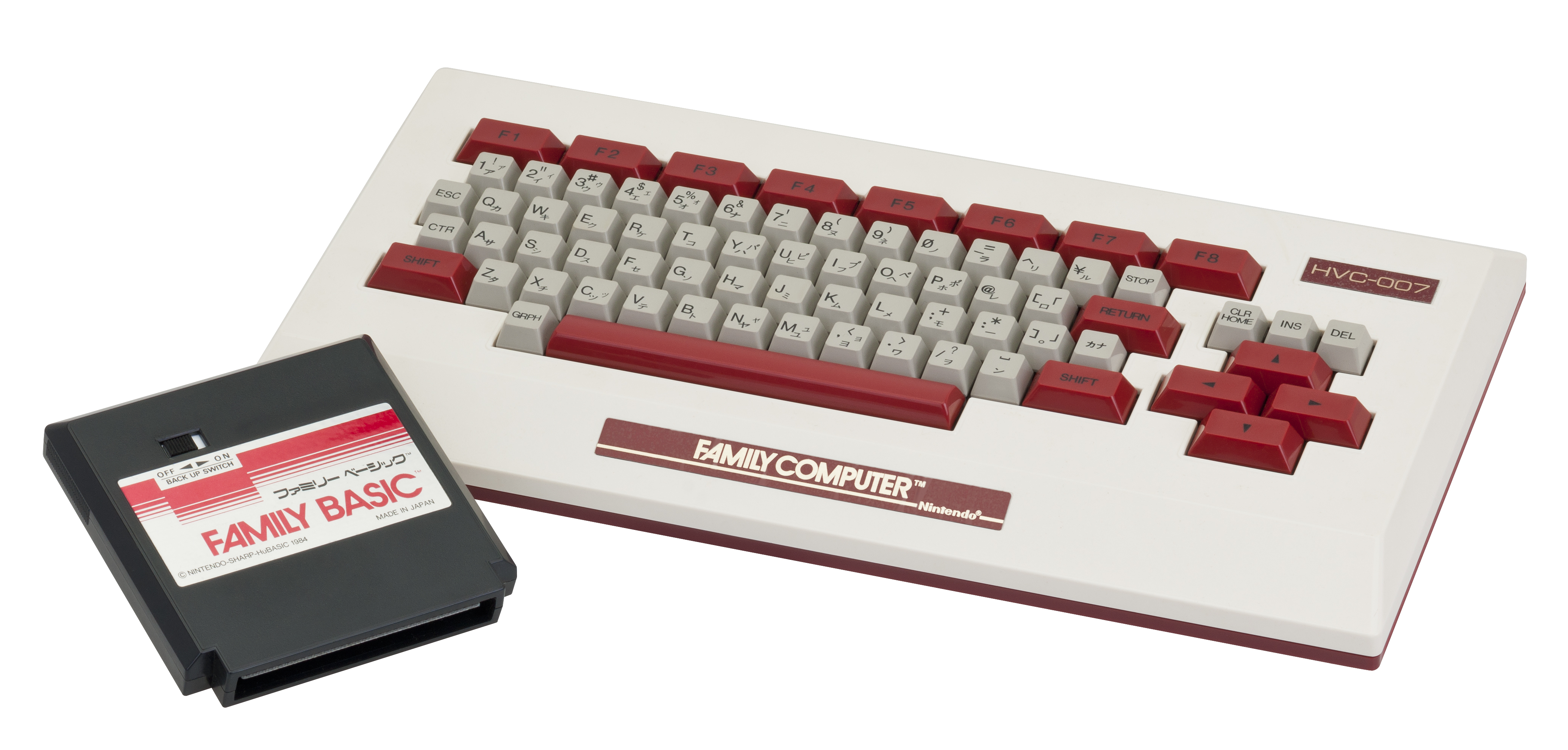
- The Family BASIC keyboard with application cartridge
- Developer: Nintendo; Sharp Corporation; Hudson Soft
- Manufacturer: Nintendo
- Type: Programming language (BASIC interpreter)
- Released: JP: June 21, 1984
- Platform: Family Computer

Family BASIC (Note: Japanese: ファミリーベーシック, Hepburn: Famirī Bēshikku) is a consumer product for programming on the Family Computer video game console. Family BASIC was launched on June 21, 1984, to consumers in Japan by Nintendo, in cooperation with Hudson Soft and Sharp Corporation. A second version titled Family BASIC V3 was released on February 21, 1985, with greater memory and new features.

== Overview ==
The first edition of the Family BASIC application cartridge is bundled with a computer style keyboard and instructional textbook, and requires a cassette tape recorder to save user-generated BASIC programs. Programs can be saved using any cassette tape drive, such as the Famicom Data Recorder. Family BASIC was not designed to be compatible with floppy disk storage on the Famicom Disk System and the Disk System's RAM adapter requires the use of the Famicom's cartridge slot, which prevents using the slot for the Family BASIC cartridge.

Family BASIC includes a dialect of the BASIC programming language enhanced for game development. Its HuBASIC command set is extended with support for sprites, animation, backgrounds, musical sequences, and gamepads. Several visual components of Nintendo games, such as backgrounds and characters from the Mario and Donkey Kong series c. 1984-1985, are Family BASIC development componentry, or appear in premade Family BASIC games.

Like Integer BASIC and Tiny BASIC, the Family BASIC interpreter only supports integers. It is based on Hudson Soft BASIC for the Sharp MZ80. Its keywords are in English.

== Development ==
Family BASIC was released in Japan by Nintendo for the Family Computer on June 21, 1984, in Japan. As part of a collaboration between Nintendo, Sharp Corporation, and Hudson Soft, it was created to attract computer users over to the new Famicom. Koji Kondo wrote a section in the instruction manual for programming Japanese popular music in the game, as his second project for Nintendo. Prior to this, Kondo had become interested in producing music through computers by programming sound effects in BASIC on his home computer. Two revisions of Family BASIC were produced — the first, "v.2.1", was released shortly after production of the game begun, and the second, "v.3.0", was released in early 1985. v.3.0 features expanded memory and several minigames built-in to the programming cartridge, indicated by a red cartridge shell.

== Reception ==
Family BASIC was commercially successful, with more than 400,000 units sold by the end of the 1980s.

In a 2011 retrospective review, Retro Gamer thought it was a "some-what useless" peripheral for the Famicom due to its high price point and lack of compatibility with the Famicom Disk System, although they found it to be an interesting collection piece for its rarity and overall concept.

In IGN's 2013 retrospective of the Famicom's library that was lost to audiences outside Japan, Lucas Thomas called Family BASIC "a legitimate home computing solution". He criticized the interface as "nebulous to navigate" but wondered how "it would have been fun to see what America and Europe's often brilliant hobbyist game developers of the '80s could have crafted with these tools in hand".

== Legacy ==
Family BASIC was the basis of the Nintendo Advanced Video System prototype, which was an early attempt by Nintendo of America to repurpose the Famicom as a home computer before releasing it in the United States. The AVS ended up being replaced by the Nintendo Entertainment System, which dropped the home computer accessories of the AVS, and the Family BASIC didn't receive a release outside Japan.

Cho Ren Sha 68K developer Koichi "Famibe no Yosshin" Yoshida began his video game programming career in his teens with a Family BASIC borrowed from a friend, spending six years using Family BASIC and submitted several shooter game programs to the Japanese publication Micom BASIC Magazine.

Satoshi Tajiri, creator of Pokémon, initially used Family BASIC as a gateway to build his understanding of the internal operation of the Famicom. This inspired him to create his own handmade Famicom game development hardware, and make Game Freak's debut game Quinty, later released as Mendel Palace (1990).

Masahiro Sakurai, creator of the Kirby and Super Smash Bros. series, was inspired at a young age by Family BASIC, and described it as the biggest driving factor in his getting into the video game industry. He devoted an episode of his YouTube program Masahiro Sakurai on Creating Games to the product, giving an overview of it and sharing some of his personal experiences with it.

== See also ==
- List of Family BASIC games
