= Eschatos =

2011 video game

- Developer: Qute
- Publishers: Xbox 360: JP: Qute; Windows: WW: Degica
- Director: Mach
- Designers: Mach; M-KAI
- Programmers: M-KAI; Yuuki Yonezawa
- Artists: Hoshi-iro-enpitu; Kunio Jyoudaka
- Composer: Yousuke Yasui
- Platforms: Xbox 360; Windows; Nintendo Switch; PlayStation 4
- Release: Xbox 360: JP: April 7, 2011; Windows: WW: September 18, 2015; Switch: JP: November 18, 2021; WW: January 13, 2022; PlayStation 4: WW: April 7, 2022
- Genre: Scrolling shooter

Eschatos (Note: Japanese: エスカトス, Hepburn: Esukatosu) is a scrolling shooter, developed and published by Qute, which was released on April 7, 2011 for the Xbox 360. Despite the original Xbox 360 version only being released in Japan, it was a region-free release. A version for Windows, published by Degica, was released in 2015. In 2021, Eschatos was ported to the Nintendo Switch exclusively in Japan, and was released worldwide on the Switch and PlayStation 4 the following year. Apart from the main game, two previous Wonderswan games by the developer, Judgement Silversword and Cardinal Sins, came bundled with the Xbox 360 release of Eschatos.

== Gameplay ==
In Eschatos, the ship has two modes of fire: the long-range Front Shot and the short-range Wide Shot. The ship features a regenerative shield capable of absorbing enemy bullets, but with overuse can deteriorate. The game has three game modes including Original, Advanced and Time Attack. In Original mode, there are only two pick-up items including 1Ups and the Flash icon which destroys all enemies and enemy shots on-screen. Advanced mode however includes a few more items including an alternate Flash icon and Power Ups. Collecting Power Ups increase player firepower, but decreases shield percentage.

The game spans over six stages that are organized with about four to six Areas per stage. There is a unique timing score utilized in each game (Eschatos, Judgment Silversword and Cardinal Sins): a timer is set to count up with every enemy wave and boss encounter. The timer stops once all enemies/bosses are defeated and the score is determined with how quickly each enemy wave/boss was destroyed.

== Plot ==
Eschatos takes place in the 22nd century where a mysterious organic alien matter - known only as the Purple Erosion - has taken over The Moon. After covering 75% of The Moon's surface, the aliens launch an attack on the Earth using flying saucers to deploy trajectory weapons and ships. The player is tasked with stopping the invasion using a fighter ship capable of great attack and defense technology.

== Development ==
Eschatos was developed by Qute.

== Reception ==
Reception

Review scores
Publication	Score	
Publication	PC	Xbox 360
Famitsu	N/A	28/40
Hardcore Gamer	4/5	N/A
M! Games	N/A	69/100

On release, Famitsu magazine scored Eschatos a 28 out of 40.
