= Buffers Evolution =

1999 video game

- Developer(s): Koto Laboratory
- Publisher(s): Bandai
- Platform(s): WonderSwan
- Release: JP: December 9, 1999
- Genre(s): Platformer

Buffers Evolution is a Japan-only game for the WonderSwan by Bandai.
