= Electronics cartridge =

Electronics cartridge may refer to:

- ROM cartridge, a removable enclosure containing read-only memory devices designed to be connected to a computer or games console
- RAM pack, a RAM expansion cartridge
- Data cartridge (tape), magnetic tape in a plastic enclosure
- Tape cartridge, for use in tape drives

== See also ==
- Cartridge (disambiguation)
