= WonderSwan Color =

2000 handheld game console

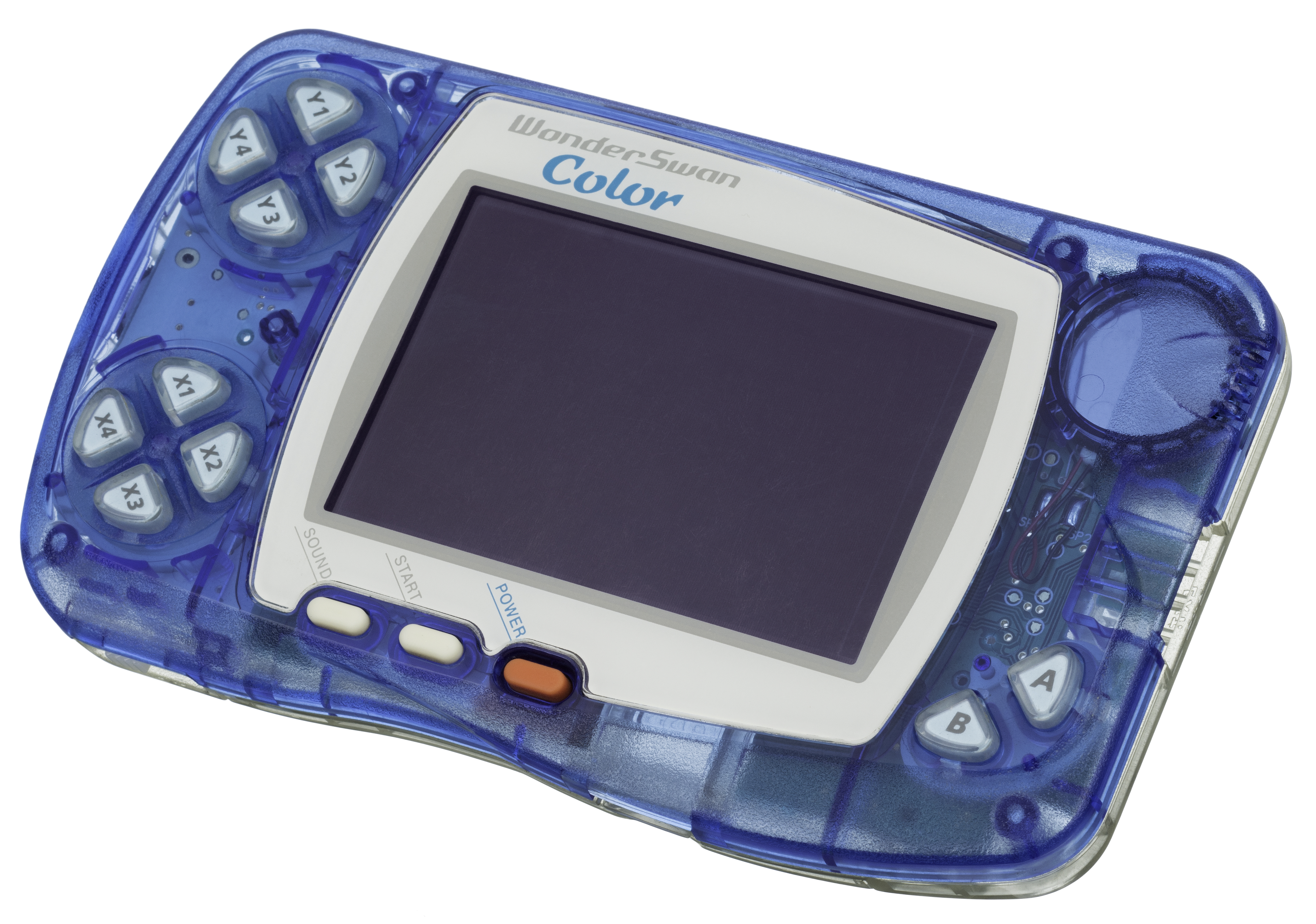
- Manufacturer: Bandai
- Product family: WonderSwan
- Type: Handheld game console
- Generation: Sixth generation era
- Released: JP: December 9, 2000
- Discontinued: JP: 2003
- Media: Cartridge
- Backward compatibility: WonderSwan
- Predecessor: WonderSwan
- Successor: SwanCrystal

The WonderSwan Color (ワンダースワンカラー, Wandāsuwan Karā) is a handheld game console designed by Bandai. It was released on December 9, 2000 in Japan, and was a moderate success.

The original WonderSwan had only a black and white screen. Although the WonderSwan Color was slightly larger and heavier (7 mm and 2 g) compared to the original WonderSwan, the color version featured 64k of RAM and a larger color LCD screen. In addition, the WonderSwan Color is compatible with the original WonderSwan library of games.

Prior to WonderSwan's release, Nintendo had virtually a monopoly in the Japanese video game handheld market. After the release of the WonderSwan Color, Bandai took approximately 8% of the market share in Japan partly due to its low price of ¥6800 Japanese yen (approximately $59 USD).

Another reason for the WonderSwan's success in Japan was the fact that Bandai managed to get a deal with Squaresoft to port over the original Famicom Final Fantasy games with improved graphics and controls. However, with the popularity of the Game Boy Advance and the reconciliation between Squaresoft and Nintendo, the WonderSwan Color and its successor, the SwanCrystal, quickly lost its competitive advantage. They were discontinued in 2003.

== Technical specifications ==
- CPU: SPGY-1002, a 3.072 MHz 16-bit NEC V30MZ Clone
- Memory: 64 kB VRAM/WRAM (shared)
- Screen:
  - FSTN reflective LCD
  - 2.8 inch (71 mm) diagonal
  - no backlight
  - resolution: 224x144 pixels
  - colors: 241 out of 4096 colors
- Sound: Built-in mono speaker or stereo with optional headphones adapter
  - three settings: mute, soft, loud
- Link: Two players (adapter needed)
- Power: one AA battery (~20 hours of game play)
- Size: 128 by 74.3 by 24.3 mm
- Weight 95 g (3.35 oz) including battery

== Personal data ==
Before a WonderSwan can play games, the player must enter some personal information. The personal data screen can be reached by pressing the start and power buttons simultaneously. It requests a name, birthday (Year, month, day), sex and blood type. The name will appear under the Bandai logo when the system is turned on. Option settings for default volume and contrast may also be set here.

== Colors ==
The WonderSwan Color came in five basic colors: Pearl Blue, Pearl Pink, Crystal Black, Crystal Blue, and Crystal Orange. Many limited edition colors were also released.

== Final Fantasy bundles ==
The Wonderswan Color was also available in limited edition Final Fantasy bundles. These bundles came with either Final Fantasy I or Final Fantasy II along with a Final Fantasy-themed Wonderswan Color.

== See also ==
- List of WonderSwan games
- List of WonderSwan Color games
