= List of Digimon Tamers episodes =

Digimon Tamers
- No. of episodes: 51

Release
- Original network: Fuji TV
- Original release: April 1, 2001 – March 31, 2002

Season chronology
- ← Previous; Digimon Adventure 02 Next → Digimon Frontier

The 51-episode anime series Digimon Tamers, produced by Toei Animation in 2001, is the third series in the Digimon franchise. It does not follow the plot of the previous two series, Adventure and Adventure 02. Instead, the story is set in a version of the real world where Digimon are creatures in a collectible card game; however, several children discover that these supposedly fictional creatures exist in a parallel Digital World and are attempting to enter the real world. The series was directed by Yukio Kaizawa and written by Chiaki J. Konaka, featuring music composition by Takanori Arisawa and character designs by Katsuyoshi Nakatsuru. Tamers aired in Japan on Fuji TV between April 1, 2001, and March 31, 2002. In the United States, the series aired on Fox Kids from September 1, 2001, to June 8, 2002. In Canada, the series broadcast on YTV in the same year. The series also aired in Asia and Europe. Following the discontinuation of the Fox Kids programming block, it aired on ABC Family, Toon Disney, and Disney XD.

Kōji Wada's song "The Biggest Dreamer" was used as the opening theme for the series. Two ending themes by Ai Maeda (credited as AiM) were used for the series, "My Tomorrow" and "Days: Aijō to Nichijō" (Days −愛情と日常−; lit. 'Days: Love and Life'). The English opening uses a revamped version of the theme song from Digimon Adventure and Adventure 02 by Paul Gordon and was the last series to do so.

The third season of Digimon: Digital Monsters, also known as Digimon Tamers, was licensed by Saban Entertainment in North America and other English-speaking territories, and was distributed by BVS Entertainment and Buena Vista Television. The show initially aired on Fox Kids, before distribution rights were held by Disney, later airing on Toon Disney and ABC Family.

Tamers was the last season of Digimon: Digital Monsters to be dubbed by Saban Entertainment and to be aired on Fox Kids, when The Walt Disney Company acquired the Fox Family Worldwide franchise of libraries and assets in 2001.

== Episode list ==
No.	Fox Kids title (Original Japanese title translated to English) Original Japanese title	Original release date	English air date
1	"Guilmon Comes Alive" ("Guilmon is Born! The Digimon that I Created"); Transliteration: "Girumon Tanjō! Boku no Kangaeta Dejimon" (Japanese: ギルモン誕生!僕の考えたデジモン)	April 1, 2001	September 1, 2001
Calumon is attacked by a Digimon and appears in the real world. Takato, a boy obsessed with the Digimon game, finds a mysterious blue card and creates his own Digimon, Guilmon. When he finds a Digivice, it copies his Digimon's data and creates a real Digi-Egg. After having a strange dream where he sees a Digimon tamer, Takato's Digi-Egg hatches and he is shocked to find that Guilmon has come to life.
2	"Digimon, Digimon Everywhere" ("You're my Friend! Introducing Terriermon"); Transliteration: "Kimi wa Boku no Tomodachi Teriamon Tōjō!" (Japanese: 君はぼくのともだち テリアモン登場!)	April 8, 2001	September 1, 2001
Takato secretly sneaks Guilmon into his house. The Digimon tamer who Takato saw in his dream, Rika, and her partner Digimon, Renamon, easily defeat a Goblimon. Takato leaves Guilmon alone while he goes to school, but Guilmon follows him and causes chaos in the school. Takato meets Henry and his Digimon Terriermon, who believes that he is not worthy of having Guilmon. While looking for a place for Guilmon to stay, Takato and Guilmon are attacked by Renamon and Rika.
3	"To Fight or Not to Fight" ("Renamon VS Guilmon! Battle is a Digimon's Life"); Transliteration: "Renamon Tai Girumon! Tatakai Koso ga Dejimon no Inochi" (Japanese: レナモン対ギルモン!戦いこそがデジモンの命)	April 15, 2001	September 8, 2001
Henry and Terriermon stop the fight between Guilmon and Renamon, and Takato finds a perfect hiding place for Guilmon at a local park while he is away. Guilmon and Renamon resume their fight, and Terriermon gets in the way of an attack. Terriermon digivolves into Gargomon, but is unable to control his powers and nearly hurts Rika before she is saved by Guilmon.
4	"It Came from the Other Side" ("A Tamer's Trial! Defeat Gorillamon!"); Transliteration: "Teimā no Shiren! Gorimon o Taose!" (Japanese: テイマーの試練!ゴリモンを倒せ!)	April 22, 2001	September 8, 2001
Gargomon manages to de-digivolve to Terriermon and Henry, remembering when he first got his digivice, is left thinking about destroying Digimon, who are real, living beings, after talking to Rika. The next day, they engage in a battle with Gorillamon, a Digimon from Henry's nightmare. Henry refuses to let Terriermon digivolve and he and Guilmon face the more powerful Digimon without it. Finally, using a Card that restrains Gorillamon, Guilmon and Terriermon defeat him. He rises again, but Terriermon destroys him by firing into his cannon as he charges it; however, Henry does not let him absorb Gorillamon's data.
5	"Dream a Little Dream" ("Rollin'-rollin'! Let's Play with Calumon!"); Transliteration: "Kurukkurūn! Kurumon to Asobo!" (Japanese: くるっくるーん!クルモンと遊ぼ!)	April 29, 2001	September 15, 2001
After watching kids at Takato's school play soccer, Calumon wishes to be a good soccer player. He convinces Guilmon to come out of his hiding place and play with him. While they are in the school, a digital field appears and a Vilemon attacks them. Rika and Renamon save them, but Rika still thinks that Digimon are just data and for fighting.
6	"O Partner, Where Art Thou?" ("The Meaning of Partners, Renamon Evolves"); Transliteration: "Pātonā no Imi, Renamon Shinka!" (Japanese: パートナーの意味 レナモン進化!)	May 6, 2001	September 15, 2001
Rika is disappointed with her mother and with Renamon for not being able to digivolve while fighting Allomon and instead getting help from Guilmon and Terriermon. Renamon goes by herself and meets Impmon, who tells her that she does not need a human to make her stronger. When a Dokugumon appears and Renamon is injured, Rika cares for her and she digivolves to Kyubimon and defeats Dokugumon. Kyubimon explains that what finally caused her to digivolve was Rika caring for her.
7	"Now You See It, Now You Don't" ("Crisis for Guilmon! The Adventure in my Town"); Transliteration: "Girumon ga Abunai! Boku no Machi no Bōken" (Japanese: ギルモンが危ない! ぼくの町の冒険)	May 13, 2001	September 22, 2001
Guilmon vanishes due to an experiment by Hypnos, a mysterious organization tracking the emergence of Digimon in the real world. Worried about their Digimon, Henry and Rika join Takato in his quest to rescue Guilmon without the help of Terriermon or Renamon. The three find and rescue Guilmon, and the warp he was trapped in is destroyed by Hypnos as they escape.
8	"A Question of Trust" ("Guilmon Evolves! Decisive Battle in West Shinjuku"); Transliteration: "Girumon Shinka! Nishi Shinjuku Daikessen" (Japanese: ギルモン進化!西新宿大決戦)	May 20, 2001	September 22, 2001
Impmon is scaring couples at night in the park, but Takato suspects Guilmon of causing this trouble. Impmon takes Guilmon out and Takato's suspicions increase when he is unable to find Guilmon. When Guilmon returns and unwittingly admits to scaring couples, Takato becomes angry with Guilmon. When Devidramon attacks Guilmon, Renamon refuses to join in as it is Guilmon's fight. Takato forgives Guilmon after learning about Impmon and Guilmon digivolves to Growlmon and destroys Devidramon.
9	"Not as Seen on TV" ("Revert to Guilmon! The Growmon Incident"); Transliteration: "Girumon ni Modotte! Guraumon Sōdō" (Japanese: ギルモンに戻って!グラウモン騒動)	May 27, 2001	September 29, 2001
After the battle with Devidramon, Takato unsuccessfully tries to make Growlmon de-digivolve into Guilmon. When it begins to rain, Takato despairs that he will never get his old friend back. However, when the rain ends, Growlmon de-digivolves into Guilmon while watching the rainbow.
10	"The Icemon Cometh" ("Renamon is my Friend! Ruki's Hesitation"); Transliteration: "Renamon wa Tomodachi! Ruki no Mayoi" (Japanese: レナモンは友達!留姫の迷い)	June 3, 2001	September 29, 2001
Rika is stalked by an ominous icy force and initially turns down Renamon's protection. IceDevimon captures Rika and attempts to make her his tamer, but she refuses. Eventually, Henry, Guilmon, and Terriermon come to her rescue, defeating IceDevimon. The intense battle leaves Rika traumatized and she claims to hate all Digimon, causing her to part ways with Kyubimon.
11	"Much Ado About Musyamon" ("Shinjuku Railroad Bridge...Duel for a Minute and a Half!"); Transliteration: "Shinjuku Dai Gādo Ippun-Sanjūbyou no Taiketsu!" (Japanese: 新宿大ガード 1分30秒の対決!)	June 10, 2001	October 6, 2001
Takato intervenes when a Musyamon attacks Henry, but Guilmon is unable to win the battle alone. Henry has to fight with his own thoughts on the subject of Terriermon Digivolving, as he previously could not handle the power of Gargomon. When a little girl gets into trouble, Henry takes action and Terriermon digivolves to Gargomon. This time, Gargomon is able to control himself and destroys Musyamon. Henry comes to realize that there are some fights you cannot avoid.
12	"Divided They Stand" ("Ruki and Renamon, The Crisis of the Bond!"); Transliteration: "Ruki to Renamon Kizuna no Kiki!" (Japanese: 留姫とレナモン きずなの危機!)	June 17, 2001	October 6, 2001
Rika and Renamon question their need for each other to become powerful. Renamon faces attacks from Flybeemon and Harpymon. When Harpymon threatens Renamon's life, Rika's intervention saves her. Renamon digivolves into Kyubimon and defeats Harpymon. Through this, they both realize the importance of their friendship and reconcile.
13	"Juggernaut" ("The Order to Capture the Digimon! The Sinister Foreboding"); Transliteration: "Dejimon Hokaku Shirei! Wazawai no Yokan" (Japanese: デジモン捕獲指令!災いの予感)	June 24, 2001	October 13, 2001
Takato and Guilmon are about to defeat a Digimon when Yamaki arrives and captures it. Back at Hypnos, they scan the data of the Digimon, destroying it and learning what Digimon are made of. Armed with this new knowledge, Yamaki prepares to launch the dangerous Juggernaut program to exterminate all the world's Digimon.
14	"Grow Mon Grow" ("Stand up, Tamers! MegaloGrowmon Super Evolution!"); Transliteration: "Teimā yo Tate! Megaroguraumon Chō-Shinka" (Japanese: テイマーよ立て!メガログラウモン超進化)	July 1, 2001	October 20, 2001
As a strange ultimate level tiger Digimon, Mihiramon, attacks, the tamers begin to fight it. However, it proves to be too strong for both Rika and Henry. Takato uses the power of the blue card to Digivolve Growlmon into his Ultimate form, WarGrowlmon, after a mental conversation with Growlmon where Growlmon informs him that he is worthy to be a Tamer after he doubts himself. WarGrowlmon easily beats and destroys Mihiramon, and Kazu, Kenta and Jeri and are impressed by Takato after witnessing the battle.
15	"Snakes, Trains, and Digimon" ("Giant Snake Appearance! Ōedo Line Great Panic"); Transliteration: "Kyodai Hebi Shutsugen! Ōedo-Sen Dai-Panikku" (Japanese: 巨大ヘビ出現!大江戸線大パニック)	July 8, 2001	October 27, 2001
Takato is depressed after Henry and Rika have previous commitments and are unable to go Digimon patrolling, but feels better when he goes with Guilmon to play with his friends from school. However, the snake deva Digimon, Sandiramon, attacks, leaving Rika and Henry to fight it on their own until Impmon aids them and tells Takato they need him. Guilmon and Takato join the battle and Guilmon digivolves to Growlmon. After a battle, Growlmon mortally wounds Sandiramon with an extra powerful Pyro Blaster, but Sandiramon warns that there are ten more Devas that will be coming before succumbing to his wounds and dying.
16	"Back to Nature, Back to Battle" ("Protect the Light of the Town! Dangerous Camp of the Digimon"); Transliteration: "Machi no Akari o Mamore! Dejimon-tachi no Kiken na Kyampu" (Japanese: 街の灯を守れ!デジモンたちの危険なキャンプ)	July 15, 2001	November 3, 2001
During a school camping trip, Takato, Henry, Guilmon, Terriermon and Calumon are relaxing along with Impmon. Soon, a series of blackouts cause the gang to become suspicious. It turns out that a Rooster Deva Sinduramon is absorbing electricity and using it for power. The Sinduramon heads for the dam for more power, but proves no match for Gargomon and Growlmon and is destroyed by Growlmon. He blasts him into the water, causing his own electricity to shock him to death.
17	"Duel with the Deva" ("Chase the Blue Card! The Rapidmon Moment"); Transliteration: "Burū-Kādo o Oe! Rapiddomon Denkōsekka" (Japanese: ブルーカードを追え! ラピッドモン電光石火)	July 29, 2001	November 3, 2001
Henry receives a seemingly worthless card, which turns into a Blue card when swiped. Henry's father recognizes his old friend Shibumi's code in the card, but struggles on whether to reveal his connection to the creation of Digimon to Henry. The Tamers manage to trace the origin of the Blue card to a mysterious man, but end up encountering the Deva Digimon Vajramon and Pajiramon. A battle ensues, with Rapidmon defeating Pajiramon, but Vajramon secretly takes Renamon to meet his boss.
18	"Digital Beauty" ("Beautiful Evolution! Taomon Dances in the Moonlight"); Transliteration: "Utsukushiki Shinka! Gekkō ni Mau Taomon" (Japanese: 美しき進化! 月光に舞うタオモン)	August 5, 2001	November 10, 2001
Rika is having a hard time with her mother, who makes Rika attend a photo session with her. Meanwhile, Renamon has been acting distant and it turns out that she has been meeting with Vajramon, who survived the Tamers' previous battle with them. When Renamon reveals that she has been using Vajramon only to obtain information, the Deva becomes outraged and the Tamers fight him in a second battle. The Tamers prove no match for him until Kyubimon digivolves to Taomon and destroys Vajramon.
19	"Impmon's Last Stand" ("I Would Like to Become Strong! Rise, Impmon!"); Transliteration: "Tsuyoku Naritai! Haiagare Inpumon" (Japanese: 強くなりたい! 這い上がれインプモン)	August 12, 2001	November 10, 2001
Impmon says that he hates humans to cover up his own insecurities. While the Tamers are battling the next Deva, Indramon, Impmon decides to battle the Deva by himself, but fails and is nearly killed. Meanwhile, Takato questions whether or not Calumon is the key to the Tamers' Digimon being able to evolve.
20	"Out of the Blue" ("The Last Resort is This! Blue Card of Friendship"); Transliteration: "Kirifuda wa Kore da! Yūjō no Burū Kādo" (Japanese: 切り札はこれだ!友情のブルーカード)	August 19, 2001	November 17, 2001
Impmon is defeated by Indramon, who then seems to self-destruct willingly. Henry's father, Janyu Wong, is introduced to the Juggernaut program and asked to help destroy the Digimon. Indramon rematerializes and appears impervious to attacks from the Tamers and the military. In a desperate move, Takato tries the Blue Card his friend Kazu made for him. Growlmon digivolves into WarGrowlmon and destroys Indramon.
21	"Jeri's Quest" ("Juri's Partner!? My Mr. Leomon"); Transliteration: "Jere no Pātonā!? Watashi no Reomon-sama" (Japanese: 樹莉のパートナー!? 私のレオモン様)	August 26, 2001	November 17, 2001
Jeri and her friends discuss their potential as Digimon Tamers. Jeri has a daydream about partnering with Calumon, but their discussion is interrupted by the appearance of the Rat Deva, Kumbhiramon. Leomon saves them, and Jeri expresses her desire to become his Tamer. However, Leomon is unsure about Tamers and runs away. When Jeri chases him, Takato, Henry, and Rika arrive. Kumbhiramon attacks again, leading to a battle between Leomon and Gargomon. Jeri attempts to use Digimon Cards, but her failure leaves her feeling down. Leomon, angered by her sadness, defeats Kumbhiramon. Despite Jeri's wish for him to stay, Leomon departs.
22	"The Boar Wars" ("Vikaralamon Appears! Protect Our Town!"); Transliteration: "Vikarāramon Tōjō Boku-tachi no Machi o Mamore!" (Japanese: ヴィカラーラモン登場 僕たちの街を守れ!)	September 2, 2001	November 24, 2001
A string of earthquakes are disturbing the city. The friends meet at Guilmon's hideout and Rika helps Jeri learn about digicards. Henry shows everyone that the Devas are patterned after the Chinese zodiac animals. A strange boy who has been secretly watching Calumon emerges, and the kids run after him. When the Pig Deva, Vikarylamon, appears, Yamaki initiates the Juggernaut program, despite Henry's father protesting that it will hurt the children's good Digimon. The partners track the Pig Deva down, but, even after digivolving to their Champion level forms, are unable to affect the Deva. The Tamers find that, if they wish to protect others, they can matrix digivolve their Digimon to their ultimate forms.
23	"A World Apart" ("Digimon Total Sortie! Advancing while Facing the Wind"); Transliteration: "Dejimon Soushutsugeki! Kaze ni Mukatte Susume" (Japanese: デジモン総出撃!風に向かって進め)	September 9, 2001	December 1, 2001
Chaos ensues as the Pig Deva causes havoc in the city, leading to an evacuation. The Tamers struggle to defeat the Pig Deva but regain their strength and confidence through teamwork and determination, ultimately defeating the Pig Deva with WarGrowlmon's powerful attack. However, Makuramon, the Monkey Deva, kidnaps Calumon and heads to the Digital World. Jeri receives a Digivice and forms a partnership with Leomon. The Tamers seek a way to enter the Digital World to rescue Calumon, while Hypnos is destroyed by Makuramon's actions.
24	"The Journey Begins" ("To the Digital World... The Day of Departure"); Transliteration: "Dejitaru Wārudo e... Tabidachi no Hi" (Japanese: デジタルワールドへ...旅立ちの日)	September 16, 2001	December 8, 2001
The kids decide to come clean with their parents about their adventures and that they intend to go to the Digital World. Takato introduces Guilmon to his parents, and despite initial shock, his father's faith convinces his mother. Henry tells his little sister the truth about Terriermon and leaves his father an email. Rika's grandmother discovers Renamon, but takes it well. Rika wears a dress to make her mother happy before their departure. Jeri gets Leomon to talk to her father, while Kazu and Kenta decide to join the group. The kids share their intentions with Ms. Asaji and receive a comlink from Yamaki to stay in touch before heading into the Digital World through a portal in Guilmon's hideout.
25	"Brave New Digital World" ("Enter the Digital World! Goodbye to Our City"); Transliteration: "Dejitaru Wārudo Totsunyū! Saraba Boku-tachi no Machi" (Japanese: デジタルワールド突入!さらば僕たちの街)	September 23, 2001	December 15, 2001
The Tamers begin their search for Calumon in the Digital World. When a Meramon attacks, the gang gets separated into two groups: Takato, Guilmon, Henry, Terriermon, Jeri, and Leomon in one group, and Rika, Renamon, Kazu and Kenta in the other. Meanwhile, Calumon and Makuramon are also separated.
26	"Kazu and Kenta's Excellent Adventure" ("Little World! Jijimon and Babamon in the Strong Wind Valley"); Transliteration: "Shōsekai! Kaze no Tsuyoi Tani no Jijimon Babamon" (Japanese: 小世界! 風の強い谷のジジモン・ババモン)	September 30, 2001	February 9, 2002
Trapped in a windy valley, Rika and Renamon try to find a way for their group to escape and rejoin Takato and the others. Kazu and Kenta stray into the house of a Jijimon and a Babamon and they dream of becoming Tamers.
27	"Motorcycle Madness" ("Impmon Evolves! The Shudder of Beelzebumon the Dark Lord"); Transliteration: "Inpumon Shinka! Maō Beruzebumon no Senritsu" (Japanese: インプモン進化! 魔王ベルゼブモンの戦慄)	October 7, 2001	February 9, 2002
Takato and the others end up at a Chuchidarumon village while being attacked by a motorcycle with no rider. Meanwhile, Impmon, now in the Digital World, meets a Deva who claims it can help him digivolve. It turns out the motorcycle is named Behemoth and it possesses a Metalkoromon. Guilmon manages to push it off, but is possessed in the process. In the end, Behemoth falls into a pool of lava, but emerges with the newly evolved Beelzemon as its rider.
28	"Blame it on Ryo" ("Friend or Foe!? The Legendary Tamer, Ryo Akiyama"); Transliteration: "Teki ka, Mikata ka!? Densetsu no Teimā Akiyama Ryō" (Japanese: 敵か味方か!? 伝説のテイマー秋山リョウ)	October 14, 2001	February 16, 2002
Rika, Renamon, Kazu, and Kenta fall into a strange dimension full of clocks. After being attacked by a Megadramon, the group meets Ryo, the legendary tamer who once beat Rika in a tournament.
29	"Goliath" ("Here is the Ghost Castle! The Great Escape of Stray Culumon"); Transliteration: "Koko wa Yūrei no Shiro! Mayoeru Kurumon Daidasshutsu" (Japanese: ここは幽霊の城! 迷えるクルモン大脱出)	October 21, 2001	February 16, 2002
The groups are reunited and Ryo is introduced to the other group, but Rika, hurt and angry, leaves with Renamon. The group eventually gets an idea of where Calumon might be, but runs into Makuramon and the dragon Deva, Majiramon. Cyberdramon destroys Majiramon and Ryo leaves the group to keep Cyberdramon under control.
30	"The Imperfect Storm" ("Urgent Message from the Digital World, Culumon is..."); Transliteration: "Dejitaru Wārudo kara Kinkyū Renraku, Kurumon ga..." (Japanese: デジタルワールドから緊急連絡 クルモンが...)	October 28, 2001	February 23, 2002
The group returns to the desert to try to find Rika. Rika nearly drowns but is saved by Calumon. A flood pushes them and Renamon to the desert and Calumon induces Renamon to digivolve to Kyubimon to save them. They reunite with the others, but before they can return home, they are confronted by Beelzemon, who Kyubimon realizes is the Digivolved Impmon. Kyubimon digivolves to Taomon to face him, but the Dog Deva, Chatsuramon, shows up and recaptures Calumon. In the real world, Yamaki has been suspended from Hypnos as the government attempts to start up the Juggernaut program, causing sudden nights and storms in the Digital World. Thanks to Chatsuramon's attack, Henry, Takato, and Terriermon get sucked into a data stream, while the others are protected by a shield from Taomon and Beelzemon flees. At Hypnos, as the Juggernaut gets out of control, one of the agents calls Yamaki and Riley to shut the program down.
31	"Kazu's Upgrade" ("Friendship with Guardromon! 'I'll fight too!', Tamer Hirokazu"); Transliteration: "Gādoromon to no Yūjō! Boku mo Tatakau Teimā Hirokazu" (Japanese: ガードロモンとの友情! 僕も戦うテイマーヒロカズ)	November 4, 2001	February 23, 2002
The group meets an Andromon who is trying to defeat an Orochimon in order to free his Gekomon slaves. Andromon loses too much energy and de-digivolves to Guardromon, while Orochimon kidnaps Jeri to have her serve milkshakes to him forever. Kazu befriends Guardromon and saves him by having the Gekomon use milkshakes to heal him and the two come up with a rescue plan. The group manages to reach Orochimon without trouble, but he is too strong for Guilmon, Renamon, Leomon and Guardromon. With Rika's encouragement, Jeri does Digi-Modify, allowing Leomon to destroy Orochimon. Thanks to his new friendship with Guardromon, Kazu becomes a Tamer with Guardromon as his Digimon partner, shocking everyone.
32	"Shibumi Speaks" ("The Mystery of Guilmon's Birth! The Mystic Water Space"); Transliteration: "Girumon Tanjō no Nazo! Shinpi Naru Uōtā Supēsu" (Japanese: ギルモン誕生の謎! 神秘なる水の宇宙)	November 11, 2001	March 2, 2002
Takato, Henry, and Terriermon meet a digital version of Mr. Wong's friend, Shibumi, and are told the secret of Guilmon's birth and the creation of the Digimon.
33	"Rabbit Transit" ("Where is Terriermon? Shiuchon goes to the Digital World!"); Transliteration: "Teriamon wa Doko! Shiuchon Dejitaru Wārudo e" (Japanese: テリアモンはどこ! 小春デジタルワールドへ)	November 18, 2001	March 2, 2002
Henry's younger sister, Suzie Wong, arrives in the Digital World and soon meets Antylamon, the rabbit Deva Digimon. As the two become friends, Henry, Takato, and Terriermon track her down. Makuramon attacks Suzie, but Antylamon fights him off to protect her new friend as Henry, Takato, and Terriermon arrive. As a result of their new friendship, Suzie becomes Antylamon's Tamer, which shocks the others as Suzie is now the Tamer to a Deva. As punishment for her actions, the Digimon Sovereign de-digivolves Antylamon back into Lopmon, her Rookie form.
34	"Lionheart" ("The Kind-Hearted Hero, Leomon Dies"); Transliteration: "Kokoro Yasashiki Yūsha Reomon Shisu!" (Japanese: 心優しき勇者 レオモン死す!)	November 25, 2001	March 9, 2002
As the gang is reunited, they are attacked by Beelzemon. However, after Beelzemon destroys Leomon, Takato, fueled by rage, forces Guilmon to Digivolve to his Mega Form. The attempt goes horribly wrong and Takato's D-Power explodes, transforming Guilmon into the monstrous Megidramon.
35	"Give a Little Bit" ("The Name is Dukemon! The True Ultimate Evolution"); Transliteration: "Sono Na wa Dyūkumon! Shin Naru Kyūkyoku Shinka" (Japanese: その名はデュークモン!真なる究極進化)	December 2, 2001	March 9, 2002
Through Dark Digivolution, Guilmon digivolves into Megidramon, who battles Beelzemon and nearly devours him before Makuramon comes to confront Beelzemon on how useless his digivolution was. Angered, Beelzemon destroys Makuramon, breaks free, and kicks Megidramon back, defeating him. Megidramon then reverts back to Guilmon, and Takato goes through deep sorrow and reaffirms his friendship with his Digimon. After making a wish that he could fight, Takato and Guilmon Biomerge and become Gallantmon.
36	"The Battle Within" ("Final Fight! Dukemon vs. Beelzebumon"); Transliteration: "Kessen! Dyūkumon Tai Beruzebumon" (Japanese: 決戦!デュークモン対ベルゼブモン)	December 9, 2001	March 16, 2002
Gallantmon faces Beelzemon in an intense one-on-one battle, and Gallantmon's actions lead Kazu and Kenta to realize that Takato and Guilmon have merged. Meanwhile, Chatsuramon is sent by the Sovereign to eliminate Lopmon, but Terriermon steps forward to save Suzie and Lopmon. Gallantmon intervenes and defeats Chatsuramon, marking the end of the Devas. However, Beelzemon absorbs Chatsuramon's data, growing stronger and overpowering Gallantmon. Guardromon and Kazu buy time for Gallantmon to recover. Gallantmon defeats Beelzemon, but Jeri's plea stops him from delivering a final blow. Takato spares Beelzemon's life, and Beelzemon leaves, filled with regret.
37	"No Mon is an Island" ("Showdown with Zhuqiaomon! SaintGalgomon, Ultimate Evolution"); Transliteration: "Taiketsu Sūtsēmon! Sentogarugomon Kyūkyoku Shinka" (Japanese: 対決スーツェーモン! セントガルゴモン究極進化)	December 16, 2001	March 16, 2002
The group confronts Zhuqiaomon, the Digimon Sovereign. WarGrowlmon, Rapidmon, and Taomon attempt to face him, but they are no match for him, and Rapidmon's injuries from the previous battle with Chatsuramon leave him weakened and flickering. Lopmon unsuccessfully tries to reason with Zhuqiaomon, and he nearly destroys her before WarGrowlmon protects her. Suzie arrives unexpectedly after Guardromon's misunderstanding. Rapidmon is defeated and reverts to a severely weakened Terriermon. Henry's determination leads to their BioMerging into MegaGargomon, which heals Terriermon's injuries. MegaGargomon defeats Zhuqiaomon and they destroy Zhuqiaomon's castle. However, Zhuqiaomon survives and returns for revenge.
38	"Azulongmon Explains It All" ("True Enemy Gets to Move! The Battle of the Four Holy Beasts"); Transliteration: "Ugoki-dashita Shin no Teki! Shiseijū no Tatakai" (Japanese: 動き出した真の敵! 四聖獣の戦い)	December 23, 2001	March 23, 2002
After the De-Digivolution of MegaGargomon, the tamers discoverthat Zhuqiaomon is alive and wants to fight. Zhuqiaomon tries to convince Lopmon to turn to his side, but she refuses and Zhuqiaomon attacks the tamers. Taomon protects them until Zhuqiaomon is stopped by another Sovereign, Azulongmon. Zhuqiaomon battles him and Guilmon and Terriermon are nearly destroyed. Takato jumps out of Taomon's shield to help and Guilmon and Takato Digivolve to Gallantmon to fight. Azulongmon lets the battle go on to make a point of how strong Bio-Merged warriors are, but ultimately stops the battle. He manages to convince Zhuqaiomon that the fight is useless and they should all fight against the real enemy: the D-Reaper.
39	"Song of Sakuyamon" ("Whirling Ultimate Flower! Sakuyamon Evolves"); Transliteration: "Maichiru Kyūkyoku no Hana! Sakuyamon Shinka" (Japanese: 舞い散る究極の花!サクヤモン進化)	December 30, 2001	March 30, 2002
Ryo finds the other Digimon sovereigns, Baihumon and Ebonwumon, have failed to stop the D-Reaper. Rika and Renamon face the D-Reaper to save Calumon, but are trapped with Ryo as the D-Reaper continues to grow. As they cannot trap the D-Reaper and escape, Rika and Renamon take a leap of faith to confront the D-Reaper directly. The act allows them to BioMerge into Sakuyamon and drive back the chaos long enough to rescue Calumon, though the D-Reaper quickly recovers.
40	"Janyu's Ark" ("Evolutionary Radiance: Shining Evolution"); Transliteration: "Shinka no Kagayaki, Shainingu Eboryūshon" (Japanese: 進化の輝き シャイニング・エボリューション)	January 6, 2002	April 6, 2002
Calumon helps every Digimon in the digital world Digivolve to Mega so that they can fight the D-Reaper. Kenta meets a MarineAngemon who grows attached to him, but he sends him to battle. Azulongmon sends the Tamers to the desert world to return home and, while Zhuqiaomon is still disgusted by the Tamers' Digimons' choice, he respects their decision and allows them to go with the Tamers. In the real world, Yamaki, Janyu, and Janyu's old programmer friends have designed and programmed an ark to send to the Tamers to bring them home.
41	"Homeward Bound" ("The Return to the Real World!"); Transliteration: "Kikan Riaru Wārudo e!" (Japanese: 帰還 リアルワールドへ!)	January 13, 2002	April 13, 2002
Janyu's ark arrives in the Digital World to bring the Tamers back, but Rika and Renamon leave to save Impmon and Ryo and Cyberdramon follow to bring them back. Impmon, feeling remorse for his actions, faints after being rescued. The ark begins its journey, but Guilmon asks for it to wait for the others. With the help of their Digimon, everyone boards the ark in time. Kenta discovers that MarineAngemon has joined them on the ark and has decided to become Kenta's partner. Meanwhile, Jeri's strange behavior worries her friends.
42	"Reunion" ("The City Attacked by the D-Reaper, The Tamer's Resolve"); Transliteration: "De Rīpā ni Osowareta Machi Teimā no Ketsui" (Japanese: デ・リーパーに襲われた街 テイマー決意)	January 20, 2002	April 20, 2002
The Tamers return to the real world, and Takato, after learning that Jeri's parents are not coming to get her, takes the responsibility to return her to her home. As Takato tries to admit his real feelings to her, Jeri continues to act strangely and does not respond to him. Calumon joins Jeri at her home, where her father is angry with her. On his way home, Takato learns that the D-Reaper has appeared in the real world and he, Henry, and Rika meet up in the tunnel at Shinjuku Park, determined to stop the D-Reaper together.
43	"Beelzemon's Big Day" ("Connected Hearts, Beelzebumon's Resurrection"); Transliteration: "Tsunagaru Kokoro, Fukkatsu no Beruzebumon" (Japanese: つながる心 復活のベルゼブモン)	January 27, 2002	April 27, 2002
Takato, Rika, and Henry reunite to confront the D-Reaper, but realize that they cannot Biomerge to their Mega forms because they are not made of data in this world. Impmon encounters his friends, Ai and Mako, who treat him kindly. When Impmon sees the Tamers fighting the D-Reaper on TV, he decides to help, despite being unsure if he can Digivolve again. Impmon's determination leads to his Digivolution into Beelzemon and later into Beelzemon Blast Mode, using Mako's toy gun as a weapon. Beelzemon turns the tide of the battle, weakening the D-Reaper's Agent and allowing WarGrowlmon, Rapidmon, and Taomon to destroy it. After the battle, the Tamers and their Digimon share light-hearted moments with Beelzemon, who initially appears annoyed but eventually joins in the fun as Takato notices Jeri's presence nearby.
44	"The Messenger" ("The Mysterious Girl! Bringer of Miracles, Dobermon"); Transliteration: "Nazo no Shōjo! Kiseki o Hakobu Dōberumon" (Japanese: 謎の少女!奇跡を運ぶドーベルモン)	February 3, 2002	May 4, 2002
A mysterious girl arrives with the Digimon Dobermon, sent by Azulongmon to give the Tamers the ability to Biomerge to Mega level. The Tamers learn that the majority of the D-Reaper is in the real world and it is up to them to stop it.
45	"The D-Reaper's Disguise" ("Stand Up to the D-Reaper, Charge into the Zone!"); Transliteration: "De Rīpā ni Tachimukae Zōn Totsunyū!" (Japanese: デ•リーパーに立ち向かえ ゾーン突入!)	February 17, 2002	May 11, 2002
During the fight, Gallantmon falls into the D-Reaper and de-Digivolves. Takato encounters Jeri, but discovers she is an imposter, actually being an extension of the D-Reaper known as an Agent. Lopmon persuades Suzie to help her digivolve so Lopmon can help their friends, allowing her to become Antylmon again. Calumon senses Jeri is in trouble and enlists Impmon's help to rescue her, which he agrees to out of guilt for killing Leomon. They find that the real Jeri is trapped in the Kernel Sphere, the power core of the D-Reaper.
46	"When is a Mon Justimon?" ("The Invigorating Ultimate Warrior, Justimon Appears!"); Transliteration: "Sawayaka na Kyūkyoku Senshi Jasutimon Kenzan!" (Japanese: 爽やかな究極戦士 ジャスティモン見参!)	February 24, 2002	May 11, 2002
The Tamers face off against the D-Reaper's agents as Justimon, the BioMerged form of Ryo and Cyberdramon, arrives. While MegaGargomon and Sakuyamon rescue Takato and Guilmon, Kenta and MarineAngemon help Takato escape from a Jeri Agent. Justimon, Guardromon, MegaGargomon, and Sakuyamon struggle against an Agent but are aided by Antylamon, eventually defeating it. Following the battle, Suzie receives a Modify Card. Impmon becomes Beelzemon Blast Mode and tries to save Jeri from the Kernel Sphere, but is captured by the D-Reaper.
47	"His Kingdom for a Horse" ("Save Dukemon! Grani Scramble"); Transliteration: "Dyūkumon o Sukue! Gurani Kinkyūhasshin" (Japanese: デュークモンを救え!グラニ緊急発進)	March 3, 2002	May 18, 2002
In the Kernel Sphere, Calumon attempts to convince Jeri to leave, but she despondently ignores him. Takato tries to convince Jeri's father to stop being angry with Jeri. Yamaki works on reviving Janyu's ark into "Grani", a support vehicle named after a famous warhorse, for Gallantmon. Jeri recalls how her mother died and believed herself unworthy to be loved, so she rejected her stepmother's kindness. When a new Agent arrives, Jeri's father angrily tries to attack the D-Reaper while pleading for it to release Jeri and is nearly killed. Justimon and Guardromon destroy the Agent, but are faced with an even more powerful Agent., which Gallantmon, with Grani as his steed, destroys.
48	"Shadow of the Beast King" ("The Power to Save Juri! Beelzebumon's Fist"); Transliteration: "Juri o Mamoru Chikara, Beruzebumon no Ken" (Japanese: 樹莉を守る力、ベルゼブモンの拳)	March 10, 2002	May 18, 2002
Grani is fully developed, and Calumon attempts to awaken Jeri. Beelzemon, with Gallantmon's help, tries to rescue Jeri from the Kernel Sphere, which is guarded by the D-Reaper. Kazu and Kenta face danger but are saved by Antylamon. The truth of Bio-Merging becomes known to the adults, and footage of the kids inside the Digimon is broadcast on TV. Beelzemon tries to reach Jeri, but is struck down by the D-Reaper. Jeri's awakening is delayed, leading to a poignant moment with Beelzemon.
49	"D-Reaper's Feast" ("Destruction of the Capital! Culumon's Wish"); Transliteration: "Shuto Kaimetsu! Kurumon no Negai" (Japanese: 首都壊滅!クルモンの願い)	March 17, 2002	June 1, 2002
Jeri tries to escape the Kernel Sphere, but the D-Reaper is determined to keep her trapped. The Global Task Force launches special missiles supposed to disrupt the D-Reaper's internal communication, but they are deleted as the D-Reaper evolves into Mother D-Reaper due to Jeri's strong negative emotions. Grani rescues Impmon, but is seriously wounded. The D-Reaper's evolution forces the Tamers to retreat. Rika and Takato are picked up by their families, while Henry stays in the office with his father. The Monster Makers come up with a new plan and Henry summons Rika and Takato, who, with their parents' blessing, decide to fight again.
50	"Jeri Fights Back" ("Crimson Knight, Dukemon! Save the People you Love"); Transliteration: "Shinku no Kishi Dukemon Ai Suru Mono-tachi o Sukue!" (Japanese: 真紅の騎士デュークモン 愛するものたちを救え!)	March 24, 2002	June 8, 2002
The Tamers enter the D-Reaper to fight and rescue Jeri. At Hypnos, everybody is working on Operation Doodlebug, which is supposed to revert the D-Reaper to its original harmless form using the Juggernaut program. The D-Reaper opens a wormhole connecting it to the D-Reaper in the Digital World and summons the Cable Reaper. Sakuyamon destroys some of the Agents, which frees Jeri. Jeri's determination is boosted by Calumon, and Jeri's digivice cracks the Kernel Sphere, though the Chaos Mass begins to flow in. Ai and Mako are granted a digivice after being acknowledged as Impmon's tamers, which heals him and allows him to rejoin the battle. Gallantmon tries to reach the top of the Mother D-Reaper, but falls. Grani sacrifices itself and enables Gallantmon to become Gallantmon Crimson Mode.
51	"Such Sweet Sorrow" ("The Power to Dream is Our Future"); Transliteration: "Yume Miru Chikara Koso Boku-tachi no Mirai" (Japanese: 夢見る力こそ 僕たちの未来)	March 31, 2002	June 8, 2002
Despite Gallantmon's new form, the others struggle in their battles against the D-Reaper. Sakuyamon sacrifices her power to Justimon, who attempts to defeat the Cable Reaper. The Digimon Sovereigns intervene, dragging the Cable Reaper back to the Digital World and seemingly destroying it. The Juggernaut program is activated within MegaGargomon, causing a reversal of the wormhole vortex's time and the devolution of the D-Reaper into a harmless program. Gallantmon Crimson Mode confronts the Jeri Agent, eventually defeating her, but Jeri and Calumon are not in the Kernel Sphere. They are later reunited, and the group escapes with the help of the others. The D-Reaper is drawn into the wormhole, devolved, and destroyed. Impmon seeks Jeri's forgiveness for his actions. To the Tamers' shock, the consequences of Operation Doodlebug cause their Digimon to revert to their in-training forms before returning to the Digital World, forcing them to say goodbye to their friends. However, Takato locates the portal to the Digital World in Guilmon's old hideout in the park.

== Volume DVDs ==
=== Japanese release ===
Toei Video, the distribution arm of Toei Animation, released a total of 12 DVD compilations of Digimon Tamers in Japan between January 21 and December 6, 2002. The series was also released as a 9-disc boxed set on April 25, 2007, by Happinet Pictures.

Toei Video DVD releases
Volume	Released	Discs	Episodes	Volume	Released	Discs	Episodes
1	January 21, 2002	1	4	7	July 21, 2002	1	4
2	February 21, 2002	1	4	8	August 9, 2002	1	4
3	March 21, 2002	1	4	9	September 21, 2002	1	4
4	April 21, 2002	1	4	10	October 21, 2002	1	5
5	May 21, 2002	1	4	11	November 21, 2002	1	5
6	June 21, 2002	1	4	12	December 6, 2002	1	5

=== North American release ===
New Video Group released a 'complete edition' of the season (for the very first time) on DVD on June 11, 2013. Similar to past releases, the collection is English-dubbed (only) 8-disc set.
