= List of Digimon Adventure 02 episodes =

Digimon Adventure 02
- Season 02
- Cover of the 2006 DVD box-set by Happinet.
- No. of episodes: 50

Release
- Original network: Fuji TV
- Original release: April 2, 2000 – March 25, 2001

Season chronology
- ← Previous; Digimon Adventure Next → Digimon Tamers

Digimon Adventure 02 is a 50-episode sequel of the 1999 anime series Digimon Adventure. It was created by Toei Animation and aired in Japan on Fuji TV between April 2, 2000, and March 25, 2001. The series was directed by Hiroyuki Kakudō and produced by Keisuke Okuda. Music for Digimon Adventure 02 was composed by Takanori Arisawa, and characters were designed by Katsuyoshi Nakatsuru. The story, set in an alternate timeline of the real world, opens four years after the events of Digimon Adventure with the next generation of DigiDestined children. (Note: In the Japanese version, Digimon Adventure 02 takes place three years after Digimon Adventure. The English version changed it to take place after four years.) In their quest to maintain peace in the Digital World, the kids battle both new and returning foes. In a 2001 survey published by Japanese anime and entertainment magazine Animage of its readers, Digimon Adventure 02 placed 17th on the list of anime that should be most remembered in the 21st century. It tied with the 1988 film My Neighbor Totoro.

The series has aired in many countries in Asia, Europe, and the Americas in a combination of dubbed and subtitled versions. For example, Mexican public and cable television channels aired both versions of the anime. In the United States, the English dub of Digimon Adventure 02 began airing on Fox Kids on August 19, 2000. Following the discontinuation of the programming block, it aired on ABC Family, Toon Disney, and Disney XD. During its airing on Fox Kids, the series helped push the network into first place during the February 2001 Nielsen ratings sweeps among viewers aged 6–11. The episodes of Digimon Adventure 02 have also been made available digitally through various media outlets. The first 15 episodes were made available for download on IGN's Direct2Drive service in July 2008. The subtitled version of the series has been hosted on the streaming media website Crunchyroll since October 27, 2008. In a digital partnership with Toei, Funimation Entertainment also began streaming the subtitled Digimon Adventure 02 on its online video portal on April 3, 2009. Volume DVDs have been released by Toei in Japan, and boxed sets have been released by Happinet in Japan and by Alliance Entertainment in North America.

In the original Japanese version, the opening theme of the series was "Target: Akai Shōgeki" (ターゲット～赤い衝撃～, Tāgetto: Akai Shōgeki; lit. 'Target: Red Shock') by Kōji Wada. Two ending themes by Ai Maeda (credited as AiM) were used, "Ashita wa Atashi no Kaze ga Fuku" (アシタハアタシノカゼガフク; lit. 'Tomorrow My Wind Will Blow') and "Itsumo Itsudemo" (いつもいつでも; lit. 'Always Whenever'). The English opening reuses the theme song from Digimon Adventure by Paul Gordon.

The second season of Digimon: Digital Monsters (aka Digimon Adventure 02 in the original, unedited Japanese version) was licensed by Saban Entertainment in North America. The show initially aired on Fox Kids and Fox Family Channel, before distribution rights were held by Disney/BVS, later airing on Toon Disney and ABC Family.

== Episode list ==
No.	English version title / Translated title	Directed by	Written by	Original release date	English air date
1	"Enter Flamedramon" ("The One Who Inherits Courage"); Transliteration: "Yūki o Uketsugu Mono" (Japanese: 勇気を受け継ぐ者)	Hiroyuki Kakudō	Atsushi Maekawa	April 2, 2000	August 19, 2000
The Digital World falls under attack from the Digimon Emperor, and the Digimon are unable to Digivolve. When Kari Kamiya, T.K. Takaishi, and their classmate, Davis Motomiya, enter the Digital World to save Tai Kamiya, Davis lifts the Digi-egg of Courage and meets Veemon, who is able to Armor Digivolve into Flamedramon and save them from an enslaved Monochromon.
2	"The Digiteam Complete" ("Digigate Opens"); Transliteration: "Dejitaru Gēto Ōpun" (Japanese: デジタルゲートオープン)	Atsutoshi Umezawa	Atsushi Maekawa	April 9, 2000	August 19, 2000
When Yolei Inoue and Cody Hida enter the Digital World with the DigiDestined, Davis and Veemon are captured. Under Sora Takenouchi and Izzy Izumi's advice, Yolei and Cody pick up the Digi-eggs of Love and Knowledge and meet Hawkmon and Armadillomon, allowing them to Armor Digivolve into Halsemon and Digmon to save them.
3	"A New Digitude" ("Digimental Up"); Transliteration: "Dejimentaru Appu" (Japanese: デジメンタルアップ)	Takao Yoshizawa	Genki Yoshimura	April 16, 2000	August 26, 2000
The DigiDestined are attacked by Tyrannomon. T.K. and Kari find the Digi-eggs of Hope and Light, allowing Patamon and Gatomon to Armor Digivolve into Pegasusmon and Nefertimon to save their friends and free Tyrannomon.
4	"Iron Vegiemon" ("Digimon Kaiser, King of Darkness"); Transliteration: "Yami no Ō Dejimon Kaizā" (Japanese: 闇の王デジモンカイザー)	Takenori Kawada	Hiro Masaki	April 23, 2000	August 26, 2000
Gabumon is captured and tortured by an enslaved RedVegiemon for helping the Gazimon rebel. With Matt Ishida, the DigiDestined rescue Gabumon and inadvertently cause the destruction of a Control Spire, enabling Gabumon to Digivolve again and freeing the Digimon Emperor's slaves.
5	"Old Reliable" ("Destroy the Dark Tower"); Transliteration: "Dāku Tawā o Taose" (Japanese: ダークタワーを倒せ)	Hiroki Shibata	Reiko Yoshida	April 30, 2000	September 2, 2000
Gomamon is captured by the Digimon Emperor, and the DigiDestined, along with Joe Kido, plan to rescue him. On the way, Cody falls into freezing water, leaving Joe to take care of him. While the others target the Control Spire, Joe and Cody are attacked by Shellmon and Ebidramon. With the combined efforts of Digmon and Ikkakumon, the Digimon are freed.
6	"Family Picnic" ("Dangerous Picnic"); Transliteration: "Kiken na Pikunikku" (Japanese: 危険なピクニック)	Takahiro Imamura	Yoshio Urasawa	May 7, 2000	September 2, 2000
During Golden Week, Mimi Tachikawa returns to Japan and joins the DigiDestined for a picnic in the Digital World. Yolei and Mimi are separated from the group and end up in the Night Forest, where they are attacked by the Roachmon Brothers. After they trick the Roachmon Brothers into cracking the Control Spire, Palmon is able to Digivolve into Togemon to help Halsemon defeat the Roachmon Brothers.
7	"Guardian Angel" ("Hikari's Memory"); Transliteration: "Hikari no Kioku" (Japanese: ヒカリノキオク)	Hiroyuki Kakudō	Atsushi Maekawa	May 14, 2000	September 9, 2000
After trying to destroy a Control Spire located in Fullmetal City, Kari is separated from the rest of the group. Davis and T.K. return to rescue her, but she is confronted by an enslaved Andromon. Kari convinces Andromon to fight against the Dark Ring's control and he frees himself, destroying the Control Spire.
8	"Ken's Secret" ("Loneliness of Digimon Kaiser"); Transliteration: "Dejimon Kaizā no Kodoku" (Japanese: デジモンカイザーの孤独)	Atsutoshi Umezawa	Satoru Nishizono	May 21, 2000	September 16, 2000
Davis' soccer team plays against genius Ken Ichijoji's team. The next day, the DigiDestined fall into a trap the Digimon Emperor set up for them as he forces Davis into a compromising position in exchange for their lives. Though the Digimon Emperor's scheme is foiled, he reveals himself as Ken to Davis.
9	"The Emperor's New Home" ("Overdrive of the Evil Ring's Magic"); Transliteration: "Ībiru Ringu Maryoku no Bōsō" (Japanese: イービルリング魔力の暴走)	Takao Yoshizawa	Genki Yoshimura	May 28, 2000	September 23, 2000
Ken flees to the Digital World to expand his territory. He captures Agumon and forces him to Dark Digivolve, resulting in the uncontrollable SkullGreymon. SkullGreymon ultimately exhausts himself and de-digivolves back to Agumon, but the Emperor escapes with him.
10	"The Captive Digimon" ("The Enemy is MetalGreymon"); Transliteration: "Teki wa MetaruGureimon" (Japanese: 敵はメタルグレイモン)	Takenori Kawada	Hiro Masaki	June 4, 2000	September 30, 2000
Ken creates the Dark Spiral, a new version of his Dark Rings, to be able to control ultimate-level Digimon. Wormmon, Ken's Digimon partner, frees Agumon hoping Ken would use him for his experiments but Ken angrily forbids Wormmon implying that a small and weak rookie-level digimon is not worth the digievolution. However, as Agumon reunites with Tai, Ken recaptures him with his new Dark Spiral and makes him Dark Digivolve into a virus version of MetalGreymon and attack the DigiDestined.
11	"Storm of Friendship" ("Lighdramon, the Blue Thunder"); Transliteration: "Aoi Inazuma Raidoramon" (Japanese: 青い稲妻ライドラモン)	Hiroki Shibata	Genki Yoshimura	June 11, 2000	October 7, 2000
When the DigiDestined find the Digi-egg of Friendship, they are attacked by Flymon and MetalGreymon. Davis is conflicted about fighting Agumon at first, but once he realizes he needs to protect his friends, the Digi-egg of Friendship activates and allows Veemon to Armor Digivolve into Raidramon.
12	"The Good, the Bad, and the Digi" ("Duel on the Digimon Ranch"); Transliteration: "Dejimon Bokujō no Kettō" (Japanese: デジモン牧場の決闘)	Takahiro Imamura	Yoshio Urasawa	June 18, 2000	October 14, 2000
Biyomon sends a distress call, and the DigiDestined accompany Sora to a Western town, where Starmon arrests them. Deputymon frees the girls only to entertain him and gets into a confrontation with Starmon. while the boys escape. Flamedramon defeats Starmon and sends him flying into the Control Spire, destroying it.
13	"His Master's Voice" ("The Call of Dagomon"); Transliteration: "Dagomon no Yobigoe" (Japanese: ダゴモンの呼び声)	Hiroyuki Kakudō	Chiaki J. Konaka	June 25, 2000	October 21, 2000
Kari has recurring nightmares and warps into the Dark Ocean, a world separate from the Real and Digital Worlds. The Scubamon ask Kari to free them from Ken's control, and they are attacked by an Airdramon. T.K. enters the Dark Ocean to rescue Kari and destroys the Control Spire, but once the Scubamon are freed, they attempt to abduct her into serving as their queen to their master, Dragomon. The two, along with their Digimon, escape.
14	"The Samurai of Sincerity" ("Shurimon of the Wind"); Transliteration: "Shippū no Shurimon" (Japanese: 疾風のシュリモン)	Atsutoshi Umezawa	Genki Yoshimura	July 2, 2000	October 28, 2000
The DigiDestined meet Mimi and Michael, an American DigiDestined, who pay for their lunch at Digitamamon's diner. Though Yolei is upset when Digitamamon refuses to accept human currency, Mimi convinces her to see Digitamamon's good side. Later, Digitamamon is enslaved by a Dark Spiral and hurts Mimi, causing Yolei to confront him and find the Digi-egg of Sincerity. Hawkmon Armor Digivolves into Shurimon and frees Digitamamon.
15	"Big Trouble in Little Edo" ("Shurimon's Martial Arts"); Transliteration: "Shurimon Bugeichō" (Japanese: シュリモン武芸帳)	Takao Yoshizawa	Atsushi Maekawa	July 16, 2000	November 4, 2000
The DigiDestined travel to a town out of the Japanese Edo period. While fleeing the controlled Floramon and Mushroomon, they meet their ruler, ShogunGekomon. Shortly after, Ninjamon puts a spiral on ShogunGekomon and the DigiDestined must stop him.
16	"20,000 Digi-Leagues Under the Sea" ("Sabmarimon's Escape from the Bottom of the Sea"); Transliteration: "Sabumarimon Kaitei kara no Dasshutsu" (Japanese: サブマリモン海底からの脱出)	Takenori Kawada	Hiro Masaki	July 23, 2000	November 4, 2000
MegaSeadramon traps the DigiDestined under an oil platform, and Cody is forced to find Joe, lying in the process. When they return, the DigiDestined find the Digi-egg of Reliability, which Cody is reluctant to accept due to lying. However, Joe convinces him to overcome his self-doubt and Cody allows Armadillomon to Armor Digivolve into Submarimon, freeing MegaSeadramon.
17	"Ghost of a Chance" ("Odaiba Memorial"); Transliteration: "Odaiba Memoriaru" (Japanese: お台場メモリアル)	Hiroki Shibata	Genki Yoshimura	July 30, 2000	November 11, 2000
All of the DigiDestined kids come together and hold a memorial for the events that took place four years ago. Meanwhile, the Fuji TV Station's cameras catch a ghost haunting area, which the DigiDestined discover is Wizardmon. Wizardmon tells them a cryptic message about how to defeat the Digimon Emperor before vanishing.
18	"Run Yolei Run" ("Tracking Down the Base of the Kaiser!"); Transliteration: "Kaizā no Kichi o Oe!" (Japanese: カイザーの基地を追え!)	Takahiro Imamura	Atsushi Maekawa	August 6, 2000	November 11, 2000
The DigiDestined decide to stay in the Digital World to find Ken's base while Tai, Matt, and Izzy plan a camping trip to avoid suspicion, only to be followed by Davis' sister, June. Meanwhile, Yolei's excitement leads into recklessness and causes Hawkmon to be injured. At night, they locate Ken's base, a flying fortress.
19	"An Old Enemy Returns" ("The Synthetic Demon Beast, Kimeramon"); Transliteration: "Gōsei Majū Kimeramon" (Japanese: 合成魔獣キメラモン)	Hiroyuki Kakudō	Hiro Masaki	August 13, 2000	November 18, 2000
While Davis and Veemon remain behind, the rest of the DigiDestined infiltrate Ken's base at the Dark Whirlpool. The Dark Whirlpool contains Devimon's data, which Ken uses for Kimeramon, despite being warned about the powers of darkness. T.K. is angry upon discovering this and confronts Ken. Once Ken releases Kimeramon, T.K. escapes with the other DigiDestined and the base's prisoners.
20	"The Darkness Before Dawn" ("Transcendent Evolution! Gold Magnamon"); Transliteration: "Chōzetsu Shinka! Ōgon no Magunamon" (Japanese: 超絶進化! 黄金のマグナモン)	Atsutoshi Umezawa	Reiko Yoshida	August 20, 2000	November 18, 2000
Kimeramon defeats the DigiDestined, but Ken can no longer control him. Fearing for Ken, Wormmon leads Davis and Veemon to the power source of the base, the Digi-egg of Miracles. Davis uses the Digi-egg of Miracles to Golden Armor Digivolve Veemon into Magnamon.
21	"The Crest of Kindness" ("Good-Bye, Ken-chan!"); Transliteration: "Sayonara, Ken-chan..." (Japanese: サヨナラ、賢ちゃん...)	Takao Yoshizawa	Atsushi Maekawa	August 27, 2000	November 18, 2000
During Kimeramon and Magnamon's fight, Wormmon sacrifices his life energy to give Magnamon the strength to defeat Kimeramon. Wormmon dies, and Ken realizes that the Digital World is real while facing his past. The Digi-egg of Miracles disintegrates into the Crest of Kindness for Ken, and with the Digimon Emperor gone, the DigiDestined return home.
22	"Davis Cries Wolfmon" ("The Brave Evolution! XV-mon"); Transliteration: "Gōyū Shinka! EkusuBuimon" (Japanese: 豪勇進化! エクスブイモン)	Takenori Kawada	Yoshio Urasawa	September 3, 2000	December 2, 2000
After summer vacation ends, the DigiDestined return to the Digital World to help the Digimon with reconstruction. While there, Davis, in an effort to impress Kari, wants Veemon to Digivolve naturally like Patamon. Instead, he angers a Tortomon, who chases them. Veemon Digivolves to ExVeemon to fight him.
23	"Genesis of Evil" ("When the Digivice is Tainted by Darkness"); Transliteration: "Dejivaisu ga Yami ni Somaru Toki" (Japanese: デジヴァイスが闇に染まる時)	Hiroki Shibata	Genki Yoshimura	September 10, 2000	December 2, 2000
In a dream, Ken recalls entering the Digital World for the first time and becoming resentful towards his older brother, Sam. When Sam dies, Ken receives an e-mail which leads to him becoming the Digimon Emperor. After waking up, Ken returns to the Digital World and ends up in Primary Village. After promising to redeem himself, he is reunited with Wormmon in his infant form, Leafmon.
24	"If I had a Tail Hammer" ("Ankylomon – Warrior of the Earth"); Transliteration: "Daichi no Sōkō Ankiromon" (Japanese: 大地の装甲アンキロモン)	Takahiro Imamura	Reiko Yoshida	September 17, 2000	December 9, 2000
Ken finds a woman in his room who knows his past. While helping in the restoration, Davis, Kari and T.K. find that their Digimon can't Digivolve naturally despite the Control Spires being deactivated. Cody is attacked by Thundermon, leading to Armadillomon to Digivolve into Ankylomon. Thundermon is killed by Ken and Stingmon, leading the DigiDestined to become wary of him.
25	"Spirit Needle" ("Sky Knight – Aquilamon"); Transliteration: "Ōzora no Kishi Akuiramon" (Japanese: 大空の騎士アクィラモン)	Atsutoshi Umezawa	Hiro Masaki	September 24, 2000	December 9, 2000
Mimi and SnowBotamon are under attack when a Golemon tries to destroy a dam. With the DigiDestined unable to stop him, they are forced to seek Ken's help. Though Yolei is doubtful at first, the DigiDestined learn that Golemon was created from Control Spires by the woman. With newfound faith in Ken, Yolei causes Hawkmon to Digivolve into Aquilamon and defeat Golemon.
26	"United We Stand" ("Jogress Evolve Now, Hearts Together as One"); Transliteration: "Joguresu Shinka Ima, Kokoro o Hitotsu ni" (Japanese: ジョグレス進化 今、心をひとつに)	Hiroyuki Kakudō	Genki Yoshimura	October 1, 2000	February 3, 2001
With the Digimon Emperor's base about to explode, the DigiDestined try to contain it, only to be confronted by the woman creating Okuwamon from ten Control Spires. While Ken comes to their aid, he wants to deal with the crisis himself out of atonement, but Davis refuses to allow this. Davis' declaration of friendship causes ExVeemon and Stingmon to DNA Digivolve into Paildramon.
27	"Fusion Confusion" ("The Unparalleled Union! Paildramon"); Transliteration: "Muteki Gattai! Pairudoramon" (Japanese: 無敵合体! パイルドラモン)	Takao Yoshizawa	Atsushi Maekawa	October 8, 2000	February 3, 2001
Paildramon fights Okuwamon while the DigiDestined enter Ken's base, and Ken putting the Crest of Kindness into the energy core is ineffective. However, once Paildramon defeats Okuwamon, he destroys the remains of the base as well. The next day, the DigiDestined meet with Izzy, who explains DNA Digivolution and the original DigiDestined's sacrifice to protect the Digital World years ago.
28	"The Insect Master's Trap" ("Bug Charmer's Trap!!"); Transliteration: "Konchū Tsukai no Wana!!" (Japanese: 昆虫使いの罠!!)	Takenori Kawada	Hiro Masaki	October 15, 2000	February 3, 2001
The DigiDestined head to Giga House to find the woman, only to find out that her flute music has put all the insect Digimon under her control, including Stingmon and Digmon.
29	"Arukenimon's Tangled Web" ("Arukenimon, the Mistake of the Spider Woman"); Transliteration: "Arukenimon Kumojo no Misu" (Japanese: アルケニモン 蜘蛛女のミス)	Hiroki Shibata	Hiro Masaki	October 22, 2000	February 10, 2001
Yolei neutralizes the woman's flute music, and the woman reveals herself as Arukenimon. Arukenimon is defeated, but she is rescued by Mummymon and they escape.
30	"Ultimate Anti-Hero" ("The Dark Ultimate – BlackWarGreymon"); Transliteration: "Ankoku Kyūkyokutai BurakkuWōGureimon" (Japanese: 暗黒究極体ブラックウォーグレイモン)	Takahiro Imamura	Yoshio Urasawa	October 29, 2000	February 10, 2001
Davis and Yolei make a failed attempt at improving Cody and Ken's relationship. Arukenimon creates BlackWarGreymon from 100 Control Spires to fight against the DigiDestined, and he overpowers their Digimon. However, BlackWarGreymon rebels against Arukenimon and Mummymon, leaving them.
31	"Opposites Attract" ("Silphymon – The Storm of Love"); Transliteration: "Ai no Arashi Shirufīmon" (Japanese: 愛の嵐シルフィーモン)	Atsutoshi Umezawa	Reiko Yoshida	November 5, 2000	February 17, 2001
While searching for Gatomon's tail ring, the girls, Ken, and their Digimon enter the Dark Ocean. When they are attacked by Arukenimon's Blossomon, Yolei snaps Kari out of a hysteric state and promises to stand by her. Gatomon and Aquilamon DNA Digivolve into Silphymon and destroys Blossomon, freeing them, despite the tail ring remaining lost.
32	"If I Only had a Heart" ("Mysterious Ruins, Holy Stone"); Transliteration: "Nazo no Iseki Hōrī Sutōn" (Japanese: 謎の遺跡ホーリーストーン)	Noriyo Sasaki	Hiro Masaki	November 12, 2000	February 17, 2001
Having developed a consciousness, BlackWarGreymon comes across Agumon and seeks his advice on his purpose in life. With BlackWarGreymon refusing to obey, Arukenimon creates Knightmon to destroy one of the Digital World's Destiny Stones. Though the DigiDestined attempt to stop Arukenimon, Mummymon, and Knightmon, the damage to the Destiny Stone attracts BlackGreymon and he shatters it.
33	"A Chance Encounter" ("Miyako in Kyoto Today"); Transliteration: "Kyō no Miyako wa Kyō no Miyako" (Japanese: 今日のミヤコは京の都)	Hiroyuki Kakudō	Genki Yoshimura	November 19, 2000	February 24, 2001
During a school trip to Kyoto, Yolei encounters BlackWarGreymon and several other Digimon in the Real World after he destroys the second Destiny Stone. Ken briefly returns from the Digital World to bring her Poromon, and their battle attracts the attention of Sora's father, Haruhiko, and Joe's brother Jim. (Note: In the original version, Joe had two older brothers, but in the English version, both brothers were portrayed as a single character. Joe's first older brother, introduced in Digimon Adventure, is Shin Kido, who helps him out during Myotismon's attack. In Digimon Adventure 02, Joe's other older brother, Shu Kido, appears with Sora's father.) When Musyamon appears, Yolei and Hawkmon defeat and return him to the Digital World.
34	"Destiny in Doubt" ("Protect the Holy Point"); Transliteration: "Hōrī Pointo o Mamore" (Japanese: ホーリーポイントを守れ)	Takao Yoshizawa	Reiko Yoshida	November 26, 2000	February 24, 2001
When BlackWarGreymon destroys the third Destiny Stone, he is convinced that he is destined to fight the Digimon that appears when a Destiny Stone is destroyed. The DigiDestined realize that destroying all the Destiny Stones would upset the balance between all worlds. T.K. becomes frustrated, and despite Angemon digivolving to MagnaAngemon, BlackWarGreymon still destroys the next Destiny Stone.
35	"Cody Takes a Stand" ("Assault on BlackWarGreymon"); Transliteration: "Bakushin! BurakkuWōGureimon" (Japanese: 爆進! ブラックウォーグレイモン)	Takenori Kawada	Atsushi Maekawa	December 3, 2000	March 3, 2001
Cody, worried about T.K., visits Matt, who tells him that T.K. still carries the scars from the battle against Devimon. Determined to stop BlackWarGreymon, Cody personally confronts him. However, BlackWarGreymon is won over by his instincts and destroys the fifth Destiny Stone.
36	"Stone Soup" ("The Steel Angel – Shakkoumon"); Transliteration: "Hagane no Tenshi Shakkoumon" (Japanese: 鋼の天使シャッコウモン)	Hiroki Shibata	Yoshi Urasawa	December 10, 2000	March 10, 2001
The DigiDestined find Arukenimon and Mummymon at Digitamamon's Chinese restaurant and discover that the final Destiny Stone is hidden in the restaurant's springs. When BlackWarGreymon appears, Angemon and Ankylomon DNA Digivolve into Shakkoumon, preparing to fight with the other Digimon.
37	"Kyoto Dragon" ("The Gigantic Ultimate – Qinglongmon"); Transliteration: "Kyodai Kyūkyokutai Chinronmon" (Japanese: 巨大究極体チンロンモン)	Atsutoshi Umezawa	Genki Yoshimura	December 17, 2000	March 17, 2001
As the Digimon fight BlackWarGreymon, the DigiDestined attempt to move the Destiny Stone with their D-3s under Davis' advice. This summons Azulongmon, who had appeared when the Destiny Stones were destroyed. BlackWarGreymon is defeated by Azulongmon and leaves to look for his life's purpose. Azulongmon explains to the DigiDestined about Control Spires and Armor Digivolution, while warning them that Arukenimon is not their true enemy.
38	"A Very Digi-Christmas" ("Holy Night the Digimon Big Gathering!"); Transliteration: "Horī Naito Dejimon Daishūgō!" (Japanese: ホーリーナイト デジモン大集合!)	Noriyo Sasaki	Genki Yoshimura	December 24, 2000	March 24, 2001
On Christmas Eve, the younger DigiDestined hold a party at Ken's apartment while the older kids attend Matt's concert. Digimon suddenly arrive in the Real World interrupt the concert, forcing the DigiDestined to send them back into the Digital World. The DigiDestined wake up the next day to find that Control Spires and Digimon are appearing worldwide.
39	"Dramon Power" ("All DigiDestined, In Action! Imperialdramon!"); Transliteration: "Zen'in Shutsudō! Inperiarudoramon" (Japanese: 全員出動! インペリアルドラモン)	Hiroyuki Kakudō	Atsushi Maekawa	January 7, 2001	March 31, 2001
As Davis and Ken fight Triceramon in Tamachi, the DigiDestined receive one of Azulongmon's Digicores from a rejuvenated Gennai, which results in not only restoring the original partner Digimons' ability to reach ultimate level, but also allows Paildramon Digivolve into Imperialdramon. The DigiDestined are instructed to meet Gennai's aides and the international DigiDestined worldwide to send the wild Digimon back into the Digital World.
40	"Digimon World Tour, Part 1" ("New York, Hong Kong Super Melee!"); Transliteration: "Nyū Yōku Honkon Daikonsen!" (Japanese: ニューヨーク香港大混戦!)	Takao Yoshizawa	Hiro Masaki	January 14, 2001	April 7, 2001
As Davis joins up with Mimi and the American DigiDestined, Kari and Izzy receive help from the Poi Brothers in Hong Kong.
41	"Digimon World Tour, Part 2" ("Coral and Versailles, the Rebel Fight"); Transliteration: "Sango to Berusaiyu Dairansen!" (Japanese: サンゴとベルサイユ大乱戦!)	Takenori Kawada	Yoshio Urasawa	January 21, 2001	April 14, 2001
In Australia, Cody and Joe meet with Derek to fight marine Digimon. In Paris, T.K. and Tai receive help from T.K.'s grandfather to save a French DigiDestined held hostage in Versailles by the Mamemon brothers.
42	"Digimon World Tour, Part 3" ("Love and Borscht, The Ferocious Battle"); Transliteration: "Koi to Borushichi Daigekisen!" (Japanese: 恋とボルシチ大激戦!)	Hiroki Shibata	Reiko Yoshida	January 28, 2001	April 21, 2001
Ken and Matt help out a Mexican DigiDestined, while Sora and Yolei help those in Russia and Siberia. Yolei and Sora are successful in Russia, but they are unable to defeat the Mammothmon in Siberia. Just in the nick of time, Imperialdramon rescues them and sends the Mammothmon back to the Digital World. The DigiDestined return home in time for Christmas, but while they were away, Arukenimon and Mummymon have been gathering children.
43	"Invasion of the Daemon Corps" ("Onslaught of the Daemon Army"); Transliteration: "Dēmon Gundan no Shūrai" (Japanese: デーモン軍団の襲来)	Atsutoshi Umezawa	Genki Yoshimura	February 4, 2001	April 28, 2001
The Daemon Corps invade Japan, targeting Ken, and SkullSatamon overwhelms Paildramon. The older DigiDestined Digimon relinquish the power given them by Azulongmon in order to enable Imperialdramon to transform into Fighter Mode to destroy SkullSatamon. Daemon demands the DigiDestined surrender Ken, but Ken is forced to hand himself over to Arukenimon's custody when she reveals the children she and Mummymon abducted.
44	"Dark Sun, Dark Spore" ("The Deadly Battle Against the Dark Digimon"); Transliteration: "Ankoku Dejimon to no Shitō" (Japanese: 暗黒デジモンとの死闘)	Noriyo Sasaki	Hiro Masaki	February 11, 2001	April 28, 2001
Ken meets Yukio Oikawa, who knows his past and wants to copy the data of the Dark Spore embedded in his neck for the kidnapped children. The rest of the DigiDestined fight LadyDevimon and MarineDevimon to catch up to him. Yolei and Cody are both forced to watch their Digimon partners kill other Digimon for the first time.
45	"The Dark Gate" ("The Gate of Darkness"); Transliteration: "Ankoku no Gēto" (Japanese: 暗黒のゲート)	Hiroyuki Kakudō	Atsushi Maekawa	February 18, 2001	May 5, 2001
Having reached his goal, Oikawa hands Ken over to Daemon. Davis and the other DigiDestined intervene, but Imperialdramon and the other Digimon are powerless against him. As Daemon is able to move freely between the Real and Digital Worlds, Ken takes a risk in redirecting the portal to the Dark Ocean. Oikawa lets the kidnapped children return home as he and his followers escape.
46	"Duel of the WarGreymon" ("BlackWarGreymon vs. WarGreymon"); Transliteration: "BurakkuWōGureimon VS WōGureimon" (Japanese: ブラックウォーグレイモンVSウォーグレイモン)	Takao Yoshizawa	Hiro Masaki	February 25, 2001	May 5, 2001
While the DigiDestined monitor the children, BlackWarGreymon confronts Oikawa, who tells him the truth about his creation. BlackWarGreymon is angered by what he hears and tries to attack him. He is stopped by both WarGreymon and Imperialdramon. After a fierce battle, they plead with BlackWarGreymon to befriend them.
47	"BlackWarGreymon's Destiny" ("The Seal of BlackWarGreymon"); Transliteration: "BurakkuWōGureimon no Fūin" (Japanese: ブラックウォーグレイモンの封印)	Takenori Kawada	Genki Yoshimura	March 4, 2001	May 12, 2001
One of the children's Dark Spores blooms into a Dark Flower and is harvested by Oikawa, despite the DigiDestined's best efforts to stop him. When Cody's grandfather fails to dissuade him, BlackWarGreymon takes a fatal blow to protect him. Noticing that Oikawa is possessed, he uses his remaining power to seal Highton View Terrace's portal to the Digital World.
48	"Oikawa's Shame" ("The Terror of BelialVamdemon"); Transliteration: "Kyōfu! BeriaruVandemon" (Japanese: 恐怖! ベリアルヴァンデモン)	Hiroki Shibata	Hiro Masaki	March 11, 2001	May 12, 2001
Oikawa attempts to bring the children to the Digital World, but because BlackWarGreymon sealed Highton View Terrace's portal, they end up in the Dream World. Oikawa's possession manifests as Myotismon, who Digivolves into MaloMyotismon using the Dark Spores and kills Arukenimon and Mummymon in cold blood. The DigiDestined become fearful of Malomyotismon and losing their Digimon, with the exception of Davis, who charges into battle with Exveemon.
49	"The Last Temptation of the DigiDestined" ("The Last Armor Evolution"); Transliteration: "Saigo no Āmā Shinka" (Japanese: 最後のアーマー進化)	Atsutoshi Umezawa	Atsushi Maekawa	March 18, 2001	May 19, 2001
MaloMyotismon tempts the DigiDestined with illusions of their dreams, but Davis, whose dream was that ExVeemon could grow more powerful to defeat him, guides them out. The others follow his example, causing the Digimon to duplicate all Digivolutions. The attacks of all the Digimon send MaloMyotismon into the Digital World, leaving only Imperialdramon fighter mode, Silphymon and Shakkoumon to face him, as he increases his powers.
50	"A Million Points of Light" ("Our Digital World"); Transliteration: "Bokura no Dejitaru Wārudo" (Japanese: ぼくらのデジタルワールド)	Hiroyuki Kakudō	Genki Yoshimura	March 25, 2001	May 19, 2001
Assisted by DigiDestined all over the world and the kidnapped children, the DigiDestined weaken MaloMyotismon with their dreams and Imperialdramon destroys him, ending Myotismon's reign of terror for good. Oikawa sacrifices himself by using the power of the Dream World dimension to become data and restoring the Digital World. Twenty-five years later, everyone in the Real World has a Digimon partner, and the DigiDestined's kids hold the responsibility of protecting the worlds.

== Home media ==
=== Japanese release ===
Toei Video, released a total of 12 DVD compilations of Digimon Adventure 02 in Japan between January 21 and December 7, 2001. The series was also released as a 9-disc boxed set on December 22, 2006, by Happinet Pictures.

Toei Video DVD releases
Volume	Released	Discs	Episodes	Volume	Released	Discs	Episodes
1	January 21, 2001	1	4	7	July 21, 2001	1	4
2	February 21, 2001	1	4	8	August 10, 2001	1	4
3	March 21, 2001	1	4	9	September 21, 2001	1	4
4	April 21, 2001	1	4	10	October 21, 2001	1	4
5	May 21, 2001	1	4	11	November 11, 2001	1	5
6	June 21, 2001	1	4	12	December 7, 2001	1	5

=== North American release ===
New Video Group released the season on March 26, 2013.

- Digimon: Digital Monsters, Volume 4 (Episodes 1–21)
- Digimon: Digital Monsters, Volume 5 (Episodes 22–37)
- Digimon: Digital Monsters, Volume 6 (Episodes 38–50)

=== Australian release ===
Two collections of the season (each containing 25 episodes) were released by Madman Entertainment. The first collection was released on 5 December 2012 with the second collection been released in 2013.

Collection	Release date	Episodes
1	December 5, 2012	25 (1–25)
2	April 17, 2013	25 (26–50)

== See also ==
- Digimon
- List of Digimon Adventure episodes
