= List of Digimon Adventure episodes =

List of Digimon Adventure episodes may refer to:

- List of Digimon Adventure (1999 TV series) episodes
- List of Digimon Adventure (2020 TV series) episodes

== See also ==
- Digimon Adventure (disambiguation)
