= List of Digimon Adventure (1999 TV series) episodes =

Digimon Adventure
- Cover of the 2007 DVD boxset by Happinet.
- No. of episodes: 54

Release
- Original network: Fuji Television
- Original release: March 7, 1999 – March 26, 2000

Season chronology
- ← Previous; Series 1998 Next → Digimon Adventure 02

Digimon Adventure is an anime series produced by Toei Animation. It began broadcasting in Japan on Fuji Television on March 7, 1999, and ended on March 26, 2000. The series was directed by Hiroyuki Kakudō and produced by Keisuke Okuda, featuring music composition by Takanori Arisawa and character designs by Katsuyoshi Nakatsuru. The story revolves around a group of elementary school students known as the DigiDestined, who are transported to a parallel Digital World and find themselves in a quest to save it from evil forces with the help of their partner creatures. The series was followed in 2000 with a sequel titled Digimon Adventure 02.

Digimon Adventure was broadcast with English dubbing under the title Digimon: Digital Monsters in the United States on Fox Kids and in Canada on YTV. The series premiered on August 14, 1999, in the United States. Overall licensing of English-language material of the series was managed by Saban Entertainment, which was eventually acquired by The Walt Disney Company. Digimon Adventure has been compiled into DVD box sets by Bandai Visual and Happinet in Japan and by Cinedigm in North America. On August 1, 2013, the show became available for streaming in both its English and Japanese versions on Netflix in North America.

Two pieces of theme music were used in the original version of the series. Kōji Wada's song "Butter-Fly" was used as the opening theme for the series, and Ai Maeda's (later credited as AiM) songs "I wish" and "Keep on" were used as ending themes. The English opening featured an original composition by Paul Gordon.

Digimon Adventure was licensed by Saban Entertainment in North America under the name Digimon: Digital Monsters. The show initially aired on Fox Kids Network and Fox Family Channel before distribution rights were sold to Disney through BVS and ABC Family Worldwide, later airing on Toon Disney from the teenage block Jetix and the rebranded ABC Family.

== Episode list ==
No.	English version title / Translated title	Directed by	Written by	Original release date	English air date
1	"And So It Begins..." ("Adrift? The Island of Adventure!"); Transliteration: "Hyōryū? Bōken no Shima!" (Japanese: 漂流? 冒険の島!)	Hiroyuki Kakudō	Satoru Nishizono	March 7, 1999	August 14, 1999
At summer camp, a group of seven children—Tai Kamiya, Matt Ishida, Sora Takenouchi, Izzy Izumi, Mimi Tachikawa, Joe Kido and T.K. Takaishi—are each given a strange device called a Digivice and are transported into the Digital World, a world inhabited by digital monsters called Digimon, where they are found by seven Digimon of their own. The children's Digimon include Koromon, Tsunomon, Yokomon, Motimon, Tanemon, Bukamon and Tokomon. When they are attacked by Kuwagamon, the Digimon Digivolve into their Rookie forms—Agumon, Gabumon, Biyomon, Tentomon, Palmon, Gomamon and Patamon, respectively—and defeat him. However, Kuwagamon causes the cliff to collapse underneath them and they fall into the river.
2	"The Birth of Greymon" ("Explosive Evolution! Greymon"); Transliteration: "Bakuretsu Shinka! Gureimon" (Japanese: 爆裂進化! グレイモン)	Hiroyuki Kakudō	Satoru Nishizono	March 14, 1999	August 21, 1999
Surviving Kuwagamon's attack, the children find themselves at a beach, where they find non-functioning telephone booths. Hoping to find a way home, they are suddenly attacked by Shellmon. Agumon is the only Digimon capable of fighting due to eating, and when Tai is captured by Shellmon, Agumon Digivolves into Greymon and throws Shellmon into the ocean.
3	"Garurumon" ("The Blue Wolf! Garurumon"); Transliteration: "Aoki Ōkami! Garurumon" (Japanese: 蒼き狼! ガルルモン)	Takenori Kawada	Reiko Yoshida	March 21, 1999	August 28, 1999
The group discover a trolley car by a lake, where they decide to spend the night. Tai accidentally awakens Seadramon by burning his tail, who pulls the island that the trolley car sits on into the middle of the lake. Sensing that T.K. is in danger, Matt confronts Seadramon and is captured. Gabumon Digivolves into Garurumon and defeats Seadramon, rescuing him.
4	"Biyomon Gets Firepower (Note: Episode 4 originally aired with the title "Fireman's Ball" and was renamed "Biyomon Gets Firepower" for subsequent reruns.)" ("Scorching Heat! Birdramon"); Transliteration: "Shakunetsu! Bādoramon" (Japanese: 灼熱! バードラモン)	Takahiro Imamura	Genki Yoshimura	March 28, 1999	September 4, 1999
The group leave the forest and reach a desert, where they find a village of Yokomon. They are taken to a nearby water spring, which is connected to Mount Miharashi, but they discover that the spring has dried up due to Meramon coming under control of a Black Gear, a gear that mind-controls Digimon. Biyomon Digivolves into Birdramon to protect Sora and the village, destroying the Black Gear and restoring Meramon's usual self.
5	"Kabuterimon's Electro Shocker" ("Lightning! Kabuterimon"); Transliteration: "Denkō! Kabuterimon" (Japanese: 電光! カブテリモン)	Hiroki Shibata	Hiro Masaki	April 4, 1999	September 11, 1999
The group explore a factory, with Izzy uncovering coding while Matt, T.K., and Mimi examine the assembly line. Tai, Sora, and Joe find Andromon caught in machinery, who attacks them after a Black Gear enters his leg from when the group frees him. Izzy uses the coding to Digivolve Tentomon into Kabuterimon, who destroys the Black Gear. As an apology, Andromon shows the children the exit, which takes them to the sewers.
6	"Togemon in Toy Town" ("Togemon Angrily!"); Transliteration: "Togemon Ikari" (Japanese: トゲモン怒り!)	Tetsuo Imazawa	Yoshio Urasawa	April 11, 1999	September 20, 1999
While escaping a group of Numemon in the sewers, the children are split up. Mimi and Palmon end up in Toy Town after being attacked by Monzaemon, the town's mayor, and they find that the other children have been placed under a spell to play with the toys while their partner Digimon have been captured. Mimi confronts Monzaemon, and when the Numemon are hurt trying to protect her, Palmon Digivolves into Togemon. Togemon destroys the Black Gear controlling Monzaemon, returning the other children to normal as well.
7	"Ikkakumon's Harpoon Torpedo" ("Roar! Ikkakumon"); Transliteration: "Hōkō! Ikkakumon" (Japanese: 咆哮! イッカクモン)	Harume Kosaka	Akatsuki Yamatoya	April 18, 1999	September 21, 1999
When Tai and Matt argue about climbing Infinity Mountain to get a better view of their surrounding, Joe and Gomamon decide to climb the mountain by themselves. While on the mountain, they encounter Unimon, which begins attacking them when a Black Gear controls it. Tai and Sora come to their rescue, and Gomamon Digivolves into Ikkakumon to save Joe and destroy the Black Gear controlling Unimon. The three children soon reach the peak and learn they are on an island.
8	"Evil Shows His Face" ("Devimon: the Emissary of Darkness!"); Transliteration: "Yami no Shisha Debimon" (Japanese: 闇の使者デビモン!)	Hiroyuki Kakudō	Satoru Nishizono	April 25, 1999	September 22, 1999
After the children regroup, they are attacked by Leomon, who has fallen under the control of a Black Gear, and Ogremon. After escaping, the children and their Digimon find a mansion to stay for the night, which they discover to be an illusion created by Devimon. Devimon separates the children by breaking up File Island, and when Tai's Digivice frees Leomon from the Black Gear, Leomon sacrifices himself to allow him to escape.
9	"Subzero Ice Punch!" ("Clash! The Freezing Digimon"); Transliteration: "Gekitotsu! Reitō Dejimon" (Japanese: 激突! 冷凍デジモン)	Takenori Kawada	Atsushi Maekawa	May 2, 1999	September 23, 1999
Tai and Agumon land on a snow-covered island and free Frigimon from a Black Gear. Frigimon proceeds to help Tai and Agumon cross over to the island where Matt and Gabumon landed. Meanwhile, Matt gets hypothermia from searching for T.K., but Gabumon nurses him back to health. Tai and Matt reunite the following day, but they get into a fight over their next course of action. When Mojyamon attacks them, Agumon and Gabumon are able to Digivolve and expel the Black Gears from Mojyamon and the island, causing them to move back towards Infinity Mountain.
10	"A Clue from the Digi-Past" ("Kentarumon the Protector!"); Transliteration: "Shugosha Kentarumon" (Japanese: 守護者ケンタルモン!)	Keiji Hayakawa	Genki Yoshimura	May 9, 1999	September 24, 1999
After fleeing Sukamon and Chuumon, Mimi and Palmon locate Izzy and Tentomon. Mimi becomes frustrated with Izzy, who occupies himself with decoding the writing in the ruins, causing her to run off and get lost in the labyrinth with Tentomon. They are attacked by Centarumon, but Izzy and Palmon find them and help destroy Centarumon's Black Gear. When Centarumon tells Izzy and Mimi about their Digivices, Leomon attacks them, but they use the Digivices to drive him off. Mimi causes the island to move back towards Infinity Mountain.
11	"The Dancing Digimon" ("The Dancing Ghosts! Bakemon"); Transliteration: "Odoru Bōrei! Bakemon" (Japanese: 踊る亡霊! バケモン)	Hiroki Shibata	Yoshio Urasawa	May 16, 1999	September 25, 1999
After an encounter with Ogremon at sea, Joe and Gomamon find themselves on an island with Sora and Biyomon before they are captured by a cult of Bakemon intent on eating them. Gomamon and Biyomon manage to escape and Digivolve to fight Lord Bakemon, while Joe uses a Buddhist mantra to weaken it. After Birdramon and Ikkakumon destroy Lord Bakemon, they ride across the sea to find their friends.
12	"DigiBaby Boom" ("Adventure! Patamon and Me"); Transliteration: "Bōken! Patamon to Boku" (Japanese: 冒険! パタモンと僕)	Takahiro Imamura	Hiro Masaki	May 23, 1999	September 30, 1999
T.K. and Patamon arrive in Primary Village, the place where all Digimon are born. When the baby Digimon start to cry, T.K. and Patamon are confronted by Primary Village's caretaker, Elecmon, which they settle with a tug-of-war match. Patamon wins and earns Elecmon's respect and trust, as he allows them both to stay. Meanwhile, Devimon sends Leomon to attack T.K. and Patamon before the latter can Digivolve.
13	"The Legend of the Digi-destined" ("Angemon Wakes!"); Transliteration: "Enjemon Kakusei!" (Japanese: エンジェモン覚醒!)	Hiroyuki Kakudō	Satoru Nishizono	May 30, 1999	October 1, 1999
T.K. is attacked in Primary Village by Leomon and Ogremon, until Tai, Matt, Izzy, Mimi, and their Digimon arrive to his rescue, where they use their Digivices to free Leomon from the Black Gears. Leomon later explains the legend of the "DigiDestined", a group of children from another world who will save the Digital World from evil forces. The group fights Devimon, who absorbs Black Gears and Ogremon. Devimon defeats the DigiDestined, even when Joe and Sora rejoin them. Patamon Digivolves into Angemon when T.K. is in danger and sacrifices himself to defeat Devimon. Angemon's data reconstitutes into a DigiEgg, and File Island begins to reform itself. The DigiDestined are then suddenly contacted via hologram by a mysterious elderly man named Gennai.
14	"Departure for a New Continent" ("Departure for a New Continent!"); Transliteration: "Tabidachi Shintairiku e!" (Japanese: 出航・新大陸へ!)	Tetsuo Imazawa	Reiko Yoshida	June 6, 1999	October 2, 1999
Gennai urges the group to travel to the continent of Server in order to defeat another enemy, informing them about the Crests, which will allow their Digimon to Digivolve to the next level. While traveling on the ocean using a raft, the DigiDestined are swallowed up by Whamon, who is under the control of a Black Gear. Tai frees him with his Digivice, and as gratitude, Whamon takes the DigiDestined into an undersea store where the Crest Tags are located. They fall under attack to Drimogemon and free him from a Black Gear. After recovering the Tags, Whamon proceeds to take them to Server.
15	"The Dark Network of Etemon" ("Etemon! The Stage Mounting of Evil"); Transliteration: "Etemon! Aku no Hanamichi" (Japanese: エテモン! 悪の花道)	Keiji Hayakawa	Satoru Nishizono	June 13, 1999	October 4, 1999
On Server, the DigiDestined arrive at a Koromon village, only to find a group of evil Pagumon living there. Despite the Pagumon's warm welcome, they are allied with Etemon and abduct Tokomon at night, imprisoning him with the Koromon. The DigiDestined rescue them, but Etemon uses his Dark Network to defeat them and destroy the village. The group take refuge in a cave, where Tai finds the Crest of Courage, allowing them to escape from Etemon into the desert.
16	"The Arrival of Skullgreymon" ("Dark Evolution! SkullGreymon"); Transliteration: "Ankoku Shinka! SukaruGureimon" (Japanese: 暗黒進化! スカルグレイモン)	Takenori Kawada	Hiro Masaki	June 20, 1999	October 5, 1999
Joe's Tag leads the DigiDestined to a coliseum, where Etemon traps them and forces Greymon to fight an evil Greymon clone. After Joe finds the Crest of Reliability, the group escapes and Tai attempts to force Greymon to Digivolve to his Ultimate form by deliberately putting himself in harm's way. Instead, Greymon Dark Digivolves into SkullGreymon, who defeats the evil Greymon but also attacks everyone. Realizing the results of his selfish behavior, Tai calms him down and apologizes.
17	"The Crest of Sincerity" ("Cockatrimon, the Captain of Illusions!"); Transliteration: "Maboroshi Senchō Kokatorimon!" (Japanese: 幻船長コカトリモン!)	Hiroki Shibata	Yoshio Urasawa	June 27, 1999	October 6, 1999
After getting lost in the desert, the group is taken aboard a cruise ship traveling in the desert, headed by Kokatorimon, who works for Etemon. Kokatorimon captures all the boys and petrifies their partners. Biyomon and Palmon Digivolve and defeat him, and his ship crashes into a giant cactus, wrecking it and destroying Kokatorimon. Mimi finds the Crest of Sincerity on top of the cactus.
18	"The Piximon Cometh" ("The Fairy! Picklemon"); Transliteration: "Yōsei! Pikkoromon" (Japanese: 妖精! ピッコロモン)	Takahiro Imamura	Atsushi Maekawa	July 4, 1999	October 7, 1999
When the group is attacked by Kuwagamon, Tai and Agumon are hesitant to fight since Digivolving into SkullGreymon. A pixie Digimon named Piximon rescues and trains the DigiDestined at his facility, where Tai and Agumon are stranded in a cave as the others do manual labor. At night, Matt and Izzy sneak away to find their respective Crests of Friendship and Knowledge. However, they are detected by the Dark Network as Etemon sends a Tyrannomon after them. Tai and Agumon regain the courage to fight, allowing Agumon to Digivolve into Greymon to defeat Tyrannomon.
19	"The Prisoner of the Pyramid" ("Nanomon of the Labyrinth!"); Transliteration: "Meikyū no Nanomon" (Japanese: 迷宮のナノモン)	Hiroyuki Kakudō	Satoru Nishizono	July 11, 1999	October 8, 1999
After T.K. finds the Crest of Hope, Izzy receives an e-mail from Datamon, who asks them to rescue him from Etemon's pyramid in exchange for Sora's Crest. Tai, Sora, Izzy, and Joe infiltrate the pyramid, with Tai being overconfident that the Digital World is a virtual reality. However, once Datamon is freed, he kidnaps Sora and Biyomon. Tai becomes too frightened to pursue Datamon after Izzy warns him that if they die in the Digital World, they will die in the Real World as well.
20	"The Earthquake of MetalGreymon" ("Evolution to Perfect! MetalGreymon"); Transliteration: "Kanzentai Shinka! MetaruGureimon" (Japanese: 完全体進化! メタルグレイモン)	Keiji Hayakawa	Satoru Nishizono	July 25, 1999	October 9, 1999
While the rest of the DigiDestined distract Etemon's forces, Tai and Izzy infiltrate the pyramid to save Sora, where Datamon plans on cloning her to use her Crest and Biyomon to enact revenge on Etemon. Tai musters his courage and saves Sora, foiling Datamon's plan. As an alternative, Datamon activates the Dark Network to absorb data, including Etemon. Though Datamon is destroyed, this ploy fails as Etemon instead fuses with the Dark Network, who then fights the DigiDestined, but Tai's Crest allows Greymon to Digivolve into MetalGreymon. When Etemon is defeated, a portal swallows him while Tai and Koromon are sent to Tokyo.
21	"Home Away from Home" ("Koromon, the Great Clash in Tokyo!"); Transliteration: "Koromon Tōkyō Dai-gekitotsu!" (Japanese: コロモン東京大激突!)	Mamoru Hosoda	Reiko Yoshida	August 1, 1999	October 16, 1999
Tai and Koromon arrive home, where they meet Tai's younger sister, Kari, who somehow recognizes Koromon, and also learn that not much time has passed since they were in the Digital World. Later, Tai receives a message on his computer from Izzy telling him not to return, and discovers that Digimon are appearing in the Real World. He concludes that they must return to the Digital World and help their friends. After Koromon Digivolves into Agumon to battle Ogremon, a portal opens and transports both of them back to the Digital World.
22	"Forget About It!" ("The Small Devil, PicoDevimon"); Transliteration: "Sasayaku Ko-akuma PikoDebimon" (Japanese: ささやく小悪魔ピコデビモン)	Takenori Kawada	Hiro Masaki	August 8, 1999	October 23, 1999
Tai and Koromon return to the Digital World to find Tokomon, who reveals that everyone has split up to find them after weeks since their disappearance. Meanwhile, DemiDevimon causes a rift between T.K. and Tokomon and secretly plans on feeding T.K. amnesic mushrooms. Agumon exposes DemiDevimon, and Tokomon Digivolves into Patamon to drive DemiDevimon away.
23	"WereGarurumon's Diner" ("Oh Friend! WereGarurumon"); Transliteration: "Tomo yo! WāGarurumon" (Japanese: 友よ! ワーガルルモン)	Junji Shimizu	Genki Yoshimura	August 15, 1999	October 30, 1999
Matt finds Joe working at Digitamamon's diner to pay off his debt and agrees to help. DemiDevimon bribes Digitamamon to keep them while setting off accidents that makes Matt question Joe. However, once Digitamamon's scheme is exposed, they battle him with Tai and T.K. Joe sacrifices himself to save T.K., leading Matt to see Joe as a true friend and allowing Garurumon to Digivolve into WereGarurumon. After Digitamamon's defeat, the four children splits up into two groups and continue their search for the remaining DigiDestined.
24	"No Questions, Please" ("Break Through! AtlurKabuterimon"); Transliteration: "Gekiha! AtorāKabuterimon" (Japanese: 撃破! アトラーカブテリモン)	Tetsuo Imazawa	Yoshio Urasawa	August 22, 1999	November 6, 1999
Izzy falls into Vademon's pocket dimension and is forced to give up his curiosity. Tentomon snaps Izzy out of his trance, but by that time, DemiDevimon tries to buy Izzy's Crest from Vademon. In the confusion, Izzy recovers his Crest and his curiosity as he causes Kabuterimon to Digivolve into MegaKabuterimon, defeating Vademon and freeing themselves from the pocket dimension. Izzy and Motimon are found by Matt and T.K. soon afterwards.
25	"Princess Karaoke" (Note: Episode 25 originally aired with the title misspelled with "Karoake", which was corrected with "Karaoke" for subsequent reruns.) ("The Sleeping Tyrant! TonosamaGekomon"); Transliteration: "Nemureru Bōkun! TonosamaGekomon" (Japanese: 眠れる暴君! トノサマゲコモン)	Hiroki Shibata	Akatsuki Yamatoya	August 29, 1999	November 6, 1999
Tai and Joe find Mimi in a large castle with the Gekomon and Otamamon, who treat her like a princess hoping that her singing voice will awaken ShogunGekomon. However, Mimi becomes too consumed in being pampered to give it up and imprisons Tai and the others after they attempt to record her voice. After a nightmare, Mimi apologizes and awakens ShogunGekomon with her singing. ShogunGekomon, however, attacks Mimi, causing MetalGreymon to defeat him. A regretful Mimi reconciles with her friends and rejoins them.
26	"Sora's Crest of Love" ("Shining Wings! Garudamon"); Transliteration: "Kagayaku Tsubasa! Garudamon" (Japanese: 輝く翼! ガルダモン)	Hiroyuki Kakudō	Atsushi Maekawa	September 5, 1999	November 13, 1999
After Birdramon defeated Flymon, the DigiDestined find Sora, realizing that she had been secretly helping them. Sora is convinced by DemiDevimon that her Crest would never glow, recalling her troubled relationship with her mother. At night, Myotismon appears, defeating the Digimon. Sora tries to stop an injured Biyomon from fighting for her well-being and realizes that her mother's actions towards her were the same. Birdramon is able to Digivolve into Garudamon, who attacks Myotismon before carrying the rest of the group to safety.
27	"The Gateway to Home" ("Vamdemon, the Castle of Darkness"); Transliteration: "Yami no Shiro Vandemon" (Japanese: 闇の城ヴァンデモン)	Keiji Hayakawa	Hiro Masaki	September 12, 1999	November 20, 1999
Gennai appears as a hologram and reveals to the group that there is an eighth DigiDestined living in Japan and that Myotismon is planning to go to the Real World with an army of evil Digimon to find the child. The DigiDestined infiltrate Myotismon's castle to stop him from entering the Real World, but they fail when Gatomon, one of Myotismon's loyal servants, distracts them with a horde of Devidramon, preventing the DigiDestined from passing through the gate to the Real World before it closes.
28	"It's All in the Cards" ("The Chase! Hurry to Japan"); Transliteration: "Tsuigeki! Nippon e Isoge" (Japanese: 追撃! 日本へ急げ)	Takahiro Imamura	Hiro Masaki	September 19, 1999	November 27, 1999
Gennai summons the DigiDestined to his home, where he informs them that Myotismon has arrived in Tokyo. He then gives the children ten cards with Digimon on them, explaining that in order to open the gate to the Real World in Myotismon's castle, they must place nine of these cards in the correct order. The next day, the group return to Myotismon's castle and battle the last remaining Devidramon guards, as well as the spider Digimon Dokugumon. The fight causes the castle to crumble as WereGarurumon destroys Dokugumon, but they manage to open the gateway and escape through it.
29	"Return to Highton View Terrace" ("Mammon: The Great Clash at Hikarigaoka!"); Transliteration: "Mammon Hikarigaoka Daigekitotsu!" (Japanese: マンモン光が丘大激突!)	Takenori Kawada	Satoru Nishizono	September 26, 1999	December 11, 1999
The DigiDestined find themselves back at summer camp, along with their partner Digimon, learning they were gone for merely a few minutes. They head towards Highton View Terrace (Note: Originally referred to as Hikarigaoka in the Japanese version.) in search of the eighth child. Gatomon is also searching the area for the eighth DigiDestined, using a copy of the child's Tag and Crest provided by Myotismon, who is in possession of the original. As the DigiDestined watch Garudamon battle Mammothmon, they recall witnessing a battle four years earlier between a Greymon and a Parrotmon in Highton View Terrace, where they all used to live at the same time. They surmise that the eighth child must have also seen the battle.
30	"Almost Home Free" ("Digimon: The Great Crossing of Tokyo"); Transliteration: "Dejimon Tōkyō Daiōdan" (Japanese: デジモン東京大横断)	Junji Shimizu	Atsushi Maekawa	October 3, 1999	December 11, 1999
While Myotismon's servants continue searching for the eighth child, the DigiDestined try to return to their homes in Odaiba after missing their subway stop and spending all their money on food. They eventually hitch a ride from Sora's cousin Duane, (Note: A stranger picks them up in the Japanese version.) who later becomes enraged after Koromon excretes in his car and accidentally pushes Izzy off a bridge, forcing Motimon to Digivolve into Tentomon to save him. After defeating Gesomon in the water, Ikkakumon carries the DigiDestined towards Odaiba, unaware that DemiDevimon has found them.
31	"The Eighth Digivice" ("Raremon! Surprise Attack on Tokyo Bay"); Transliteration: "Reamon! Tōkyōwan Shūgeki" (Japanese: レアモン! 東京湾襲撃)	Hiroki Shibata	Hiro Masaki	October 10, 1999	December 18, 1999
As the DigiDestined return home, Tai wonders if Kari might be the eighth child, since she also witnessed the Digimon battle four years earlier. The Kamiya family's cat, Miko, finds the eighth child's Digivice under Kari's bed and carries it all over town. That night, after detecting the presence of an unidentified Digimon in Tokyo Bay, (Note: Originally referred to as Shibaura in the Japanese version.) Izzy goes there to investigate. While Kabuterimon battles Raremon, Izzy and DemiDevimon both chase a signal from the eighth Digivice, still being carried by Miko before a crow carries it away. After defeating Raremon, Kabuterimon rescues Izzy from DemiDevimon.
32	"Gatomon Comes Calling" ("Tokyo Tower Is Hot! DeathMeramon"); Transliteration: "Atsui ze Tōkyō Tower! DesuMeramon" (Japanese: 熱いぜ東京タワー! デスメラモン)	Tetsuo Imazawa	Satoru Nishizono	October 17, 1999	December 18, 1999
While the DigiDestined continue their search for the eighth child, Sora and Mimi head to Tokyo Tower and are ambushed by SkullMeramon, prompting Birdramon and Togemon to battle him. Tai and Izzy come to their aid, with Greymon Digivolving into MetalGreymon and defeating him while Kabuterimon prevents the Tower from collapsing. Meanwhile, Gatomon meets Kari and suspects that she is the eighth child. Following Kari home, Gatomon prepares to kill her but hesitates and flees in confusion.
33	"Out on the Town (Note: Starting with this episode, an updated version of the intro is used due to the inclusion of Gatomon.)" ("Pump and Gotsu Are Shibuya-Type Digimon"); Transliteration: "Panpu to Gotsu wa Shibuya-kei Dejimon" (Japanese: パンプとゴツは渋谷系デジモン)	Hiroyuki Kakudō	Yoshio Urasawa	October 24, 1999	January 29, 2000
T.K. and Patamon get into a fight on their way home, and when Patamon flies off, Matt and T.K. follow him into Shibuya. They encounter Pumpkinmon and Gotsumon, who are more interested in having fun rather than following Myotismon's orders to search for the eighth child. When they refuse to fight Matt and T.K., Myotismon punishes them. (Note: In the original version, Pumpkinmon and Gotsumon are killed by Myotismon. Their demise is changed to banishment in the English dub.) Angered, WereGarurumon and Angemon drive Myotismon away, before T.K. apologizes to Patamon for their earlier argument.
34	"The Eighth Child Revealed" ("The Bond of Destiny! Tailmon"); Transliteration: "Unmei no Kizuna! Teirumon" (Japanese: 運命の絆! テイルモン)	Takenori Kawada	Genki Yoshimura	October 31, 1999	February 5, 2000
With the help of her close friend Wizardmon, Gatomon realizes that she is the partner of Kari, who is the eighth DigiDestined. Entrusting Kari's Digivice to Tai, Wizardmon and Gatomon infiltrate Myotismon's lair to steal the Crest of Light. Myotismon catches them in the process and discovers that Gatomon is the eighth Digimon, throwing Wizardmon into the ocean while holding Gatomon captive, intending to use her as bait for the eighth child.
35	"Flower Power" ("Odaiba's Fairy! Lilymon Blossoms"); Transliteration: "Odaiba no Yōsei! Ririmon Kaika" (Japanese: お台場の妖精! リリモン開花)	Takahiro Imamura	Hiro Masaki	November 7, 1999	February 5, 2000
Myotismon surrounds Odaiba in fog and has his henchmen capture all families living in the area. Among the prisoners, Sora and Mimi try to devise an escape, using Joe's Buddhist mantra to weaken the Bakemon. However, Phantomon is unaffected and DarkTyrannomon overpowers Togemon. After Togemon Digivolves into Lillymon to tame DarkTyrannomon, she finds herself facing Myotismon while Biyomon Digivolves into Birdramon to drive off Phantomon.
36	"City Under Siege" ("Break through the Barrier! Zudomon Spark!"); Transliteration: "Kekkai Toppa! Zudomon Spāku!" (Japanese: 結界突破! ズドモンスパーク!)	Tetsuharu Nakamura	Atsushi Maekawa	November 14, 1999	February 12, 2000
Sora escapes, but Mimi is recaptured, while Izzy heads to Fuji TV Station. Joe and T.K. travel back through Odaiba Bay and find Wizardmon, but they are attacked by MegaSeadramon, who is defeated by Ikkakumon's Ultimate form, Zudomon. Tai entrusts Kari to Matt before heading towards the convention center, but Phantomon follows Sora to them, resulting Phantomon to summon Tuskmon and Snimon to attack Sora and Matt. Kari reveals herself as the eighth child and offers herself to Phantomon in exchange for their safety.
37	"Wizardmon's Gift" ("Perfects Attack Together! Sparkling Angewomon"); Transliteration: "Kanzentai Sō-shingeki! Kirameku Enjiwomon" (Japanese: 完全体総進撃! きらめくエンジェウーモン)	Hiroki Shibata	Genki Yoshimura	November 21, 1999	February 12, 2000
The DigiDestined reunite at Fuji TV Station to fight Myotismon and Phantomon. Myotismon tries to kill Kari and Gatomon, Wizardmon sacrifices himself to protect them. Distraught, Kari causes Gatomon to Digivolve into Angewomon, destroying Myotismon with a combined attack. However, fog still remains around Odaiba.
38	"Prophecy" ("Revival! The Demon Lord VenomVamdemon"); Transliteration: "Fukkatsu! Maō VenomuVandemon" (Japanese: 復活! 魔王ヴェノムヴァンデモン)	Hiroyuki Kakudō	Hiro Masaki	November 28, 1999	February 19, 2000
Myotismon is reborn as VenomMyotismon, empowering himself by consuming his defeated army before advancing to the convention center for the humans. Recalling Gennai's prophecy from earlier, Izzy discovers that Angemon and Angewomon must strike Tai and Matt in order to bring about a miracle that will allow them to defeat VenomMyotismon. Tai and Matt risk their lives and fulfill the prophecy, allowing Agumon and Gabumon to Warp Digivolve into WarGreymon and MetalGarurumon.
39	"The Battle for Earth" ("Two Ultimate Evolutions! Get Rid of the Darkness!"); Transliteration: "Nidai kyūkyoku Shinka! Yami o Buttobase!" (Japanese: 二大究極進化! 闇をぶっとばせ!)	Junji Shimizu	Atsushi Maekawa	December 5, 1999	February 19, 2000
VenomMyotismon is defeated after he exposes his weak point, which WarGreymon and MetalGarurumon exploit. The fog clears to reveal the Digital World reflected in the sky, and the DigiDestined realize that the boundaries between both worlds have begun to intersect, as years have passed in the Digital World since their departure. The DigiDestined decide to return to the Digital World, leaving their families.
40	"Enter the Dark Masters" ("The Four Kings of the Devilish Mountain! The Dark Masters!"); Transliteration: "Ma no Yama no Shitennō! Dāku Masutāzu" (Japanese: 魔の山の四天王! ダークマスターズ)	Tetsuo Imazawa	Satoru Nishizono	December 12, 1999	February 26, 2000
As the DigiDestined return to the Digital World, they encounter Chuumon, who tells them that the Dark Masters (consisting of MetalSeadramon, Puppetmon, Machinedramon and Piedmon) have taken over the Digital World while they were in Tokyo, reforming the world into Spiral Mountain. When the Dark Masters turned the whole Digital World into Spiral Mountain, Chuumon became devastated when he lost Sukamon. The DigiDestined face the Dark Masters, who overpower their Digimon, and Chuumon sacrifices himself to protect Mimi. Pixiemon arrives to save the DigiDestined, sacrificing himself to allow them to escape.
41	"Sea-Sick and Tired" ("The Hardened King of the Seas! MetalSeadramon"); Transliteration: "Araburu Umi no Ō! MetaruShīdoramon" (Japanese: 荒ぶる海の王! メタルシードラモン)	Takenori Kawada	Yoshio Urusawa	December 19, 1999	February 26, 2000
The children manage to escape MetalSeadramon's minion, Scorpiomon. They attempt to escape by sea, but they are immediately stopped by MetalSeadramon.
42	"Under Pressure" ("Silent Whamon on the Bottom of the Sea"); Transliteration: "Chinmoku no Kaitei Hoēmon" (Japanese: 沈黙の海底ホエーモン)	Takahiro Imamura	Akatsuki Yamatoya	December 26, 1999	March 4, 2000
Under attack from MetalSeadramon, Whamon comes to the DigiDestined's rescue and they flee to the bottom of the ocean from the Divermon. (Note: Whamon's arrival to save the children took place at the end of the previous episode in the Japanese version.) Unfortunately, MetalSeadramon and his army of Divermon find them. Whamon and Zudomon destroy the Divermon, while WarGreymon battles MetalSeadramon.
43	"Playing Games" ("The Dangerous Game! Pinocchimon"); Transliteration: "Kiken na Yūgi! Pinokkimon" (Japanese: 危険な遊戯! ピノッキモン)	Hiroki Shibata	Genki Yoshimura	January 9, 2000	March 25, 2000
Whamon sacrifices himself while saving WarGreymon, allowing WarGreymon to defeat MetalSeadramon. (Note: Whamon's sacrifice and MetalSeadramon's death took place at the end of the previous episode in the Japanese version.) MetalSeadramon's death causes Spiral Mountain's ocean to disappear. The DigiDestined proceed to Puppetmon's forest, where he separates them using voodoo dolls, causing Matt to become overprotective of T.K. Puppetmon forces T.K. to play a deadly game of hide-and-seek in exchange for the DigiDestined's safety, but T.K. tricks him and sabotages his control room. After the other DigiDestined regroup and defeat Kiwimon, Matt becomes discouraged seeing that T.K. has escaped without his help.
44	"Trash Day" ("Jureimon of the Lost Forest"); Transliteration: "Mayoi no Mori no Jureimon" (Japanese: 迷いの森のジュレイモン)	Hiroyuki Kakudō	Atsushi Maekawa	January 16, 2000	April 1, 2000
While Puppetmon orders the Garbagemon to attack the DigiDestined, Matt withdraws and meets Cherrymon. Cherrymon convinces him to defeat Tai, who he claims is the source of Matt's self-doubt. Matt returns to the DigiDestined and demands Tai to fight him, while Cherrymon is killed by Puppetmon after warning him not to underestimate an advantage that the DigiDestined have over him.
45	"The Ultimate Clash" ("Clash of the Ultimates! WarGreymon vs. MetalGarurumon"); Transliteration: "Kyūkyokutai Gekitotsu! WōGureimon tai MetaruGarurumon" (Japanese: 究極体激突! ウォーグレイモンVSメタルガルルモン)	Tetsuo Imazawa	Hiro Masaki	January 23, 2000	April 8, 2000
Tension runs high as a fight breaks out between Matt, Tai, and their Digimon. Kari's body is taken over a strange entity, who explains why the DigiDestined were chosen to save the Digital World. Uncertain, Matt leaves the group. Upset from all of the conflict, Mimi leaves as well, with Joe accompanying her. The rest of the DigiDestined continue their journey to fight the Dark Masters.
46	"Etemon's Comeback Tour" ("MetalEtemon's Counterattack"); Transliteration: "MetaruEtemon no Gyakushū" (Japanese: メタルエテモンの逆襲)	Takenori Kawada	Hiro Masaki	January 30, 2000	April 15, 2000
Joe and Mimi rescue an injured Ogremon, while Etemon returns as MetalEtemon to take revenge on them. Meanwhile, Tai's group infiltrate Puppetmon's mansion with the help of two of his playmates Floramon and Deramon, keeping Puppetmon at bay with his own cannon.
47	"Ogremon's Honor" ("Oh Wind! Oh Light! SaberLeomon"); Transliteration: "Kaze yo! Hikari yo! SāberuReomon" (Japanese: 風よ! 光よ! サーベルレオモン)	Takao Yoshizawa	Atsushi Maekawa	February 6, 2000	April 22, 2000
SaberLeomon, Leomon's advanced form, rescues Joe and Mimi, but they are found by MetalEtemon again. Tai's group come face to face with the RedVegiemon. SaberLeomon destroys MetalEtemon with Joe and Zudomon's help but dies from a fatal wound from protecting Mimi. At the same time, Puppetmon turns his mansion into a giant wooden robot to attack the DigiDestined, but is destroyed by Matt and MetalGarurumon upon escaping, resulting in his mansion collapsing and his forest disappearing. Recognizing Puppetmon's defeat and Leomon's sacrifice, Mimi regains her will to fight as she and Joe decide to gather more reinforcements while Tai's group fights the remaining Dark Masters.
48	"My Sister's Keeper" ("Bombing Mission! Mugendramon"); Transliteration: "Bakugeki Shirei! Mugendoramon" (Japanese: 爆撃指令! ムゲンドラモン)	Hiroki Shibata	Satoru Nishizono	February 13, 2000	April 29, 2000
While approaching a city, Kari falls ill, and Tai becomes nearly hysterical as he and Izzy search for medicine. However, the DigiDestined learn too late that the city they are in is under Machinedramon's control, surrounded by Mechanorimon and Tankmon. Although they dismantle the tracking system, Tai and Izzy return and are nearly killed by Megadramon and Gigadramon, but Angemon saves them. However, Machinedramon fires at the building the children are in, sending them into the sewers below.
49	"The Crest of Light" ("Farewell, Numemon"); Transliteration: "Saraba Numemon" (Japanese: さらばヌメモン)	Takahiro Imamura	Yoshio Urasawa	February 20, 2000	May 6, 2000
Kari recovers, and, along with Sora and T.K., begins searching for the others. Encountering WaruMonzaemon, Kari frees the Numemon he has enslaved and her Crest re-energizes the Digimon. Tai and Izzy are found by Andromon, and once they are reunited, they battle Machinedramon. After the Numemon sacrifice themselves to save Kari, WarGreymon destroys Machinedramon, causing the city to disappear.
50	"Joe's Battle" ("Battle Between Women! LadyDevimon"); Transliteration: "Onna no Tatakai! RedīDebimon" (Japanese: 女の戦い! レディデビモン)	Hiroyuki Kakudō	Atsushi Maekawa	February 27, 2000	May 13, 2000
As Joe goes off on his own to find Matt, Tai's group encounters LadyDevimon, one of Piedmon's servants. Tai sends Sora and T.K. to locate the rest of the missing DigiDestined while the rest remain to face LadyDevimon. LadyDevimon and Angewomon square off in an intense one-on-one battle. LadyDevimon eventually defeats Angewomon after a brutal fight. However, just as LadyDevimon is about to finish Angewomon off, MegaKabuterimon saves her, allowing her to defeat LadyDevimon, clearing the path for a final confrontation with Piedmon.
51	"The Crest of Friendship" ("Piemon: The Clown from Hell"); Transliteration: "Jigoku no Dōkeshi Piemon" (Japanese: 地獄の道化師 ピエモン)	Takao Yoshizawa	Genki Yoshimura	March 5, 2000	May 20, 2000
Piedmon and WarGreymon battle, but WarGreymon cannot stop him alone. Matt falls into a dark cave, but he escapes once he confronts his feelings. Joe finds Matt and they encounter T.K. after Sora has fallen into her own dark cave. After rescuing Sora, they return to reunite with Tai and the others. Matt makes up with Tai, activating the Crest of Friendship. With all of the DigiDestined but Mimi reunited, both WarGreymon and MetalGarurumon prepare to battle Piedmon.
52	"Piedmon's Last Jest" ("The Holy Swordsman! HolyAngemon"); Transliteration: "Seikenshi! HōrīEnjemon" (Japanese: 聖剣士! ホーリーエンジェモン)	Takenori Kawada	Hiro Masaki	March 12, 2000	May 20, 2000
Piedmon turns the DigiDestined and their Digimon into doll keychains. With T.K. and Kari remaining, T.K. imagines Matt giving him advice, regaining hope and activating his Crest. Angemon Digivolves into MagnaAngemon and saves the rest of the DigiDestined. Mimi arrives with reinforcements and together, they defeat Piedmon and a horde of Vilemon. With all Dark Masters defeated, the last of Spiral Mountain disappears. The DigiDestined are unable to celebrate their victory when they receive an e-mail from Gennai, who reveals that another enemy is the true cause for the destruction of the Digital World.
53	"Now Apocalymon" ("The Final Dark Digimon"); Transliteration: "Saigo no Ankoku Dejimon" (Japanese: 最後の暗黒デジモン)	Hiroki Shibata	Genki Yoshimura	March 19, 2000	June 24, 2000
The DigiDestined face Apocalymon, the creator of the evil Digimon, and during battle, he destroys their Crests and deletes them and their Digimon. In the data space, the Digimon encourage the DigiDestined to continue fighting, and they learn that the true Crest power had been inside of them all along. The DigiDestined regain their will to fight and return to the Digital World to confront Apocalymon again.
54	"The Fate of Two Worlds" ("A New World"); Transliteration: "Arata na Sekai" (Japanese: 新たな世界)	Takahiro Imamura	Hiro Masaki	March 26, 2000	June 24, 2000
The DigiDestined defeat Apocalymon and save both the Digital and Real Worlds. The Digital World begins reformatting, and since time in both worlds is now synchronized, the DigiDestined have two hours to return to their world, as the portal will close forever and they will be stuck there. The DigiDestined say goodbye to their Digimon partners before leaving.

== Home media ==
=== Japanese release ===
The series was released on 13 VHS volumes by Toei Video. The series was also released as a 9-disc DVD boxed set by Bandai Visual on July 25, 2006, with each disc containing six episodes. Happinet also released its own 9-disc set on December 21, 2007. And an 8-Disc Standard Definition Upscaled Blu-ray set, in March 2015. Each disc contained 7 episodes. Also comes with a limited edition drama CD, and art booklet.

=== North American release ===
The first 13 episodes were released in 1999 & 2000 by Fox Kids Video under license by 20th Century Fox Home Entertainment. The entire first season was released on October 9, 2012, by New Video. An "English Language Version" Blu-ray set featuring the dub was released on December 27, 2022, by Discotek Media with an "Original Japanese Version" released on July 25, 2023.

- Digimon: Digital Monsters, Volume 1 (Episodes 1–21)
- Digimon: Digital Monsters, Volume 2 (Episodes 22–39)
- Digimon: Digital Monsters, Volume 3 (Episodes 40–54)

=== United Kingdom release ===
The first 20 episodes were released on four DVD sets by Maximum Entertainment between 2004 and 2008. The entire first season was released as one set on October 3, 2016, by Manga Entertainment.

- Digimon: Digital Monsters – Volume 1 (2004)
- Digimon: Digital Monsters – Volume 2 (2006)
- Digimon: Digital Monsters Collection (2007)
- Digimon: Digital Monsters – Subzero Ice Punch (2008)
- Digimon: Digital Monsters – Complete Season 1 (2016)

=== Australian release ===
Collection 1, containing 27 episodes was released on the August 17 in Australia by Madman Entertainment. Collection 2, was released on 11 October containing the remaining 27 episodes of the season.

Collection	Release date	Episodes
1	August 17, 2011	27 (1–27)
2	October 19, 2011	27 (28–54)

== See also ==
- Digimon
- List of Digimon Adventure 02 episodes
