= Digimon Adventure 02 =

Japanese anime television series

- デジモンアドベンチャー02
- Genre: Adventure; Science fantasy
- Created by: Akiyoshi Hongo
- Developed by: Atsushi Maekawa; Genki Yoshimura
- Directed by: Hiroyuki Kakudō
- Music by: Takanori Arisawa
- Country of origin: Japan
- Original language: Japanese
- No. of episodes: 50 (list of episodes)

Production
- Production companies: Fuji Television; Yomiko Advertising; Toei Animation

Original release
- Network: Fuji Television
- Release: April 2, 2000 – March 25, 2001

Related
- Anime film

Hurricane Touchdown!!
- Directed by: Shigeyasu Yamauchi
- Studio: Toei Animation
- Licensed by: NA: Discotek Media
- Released: July 8, 2000
- Runtime: 65 minutes
- Anime film

Revenge of Diaboromon
- Directed by: Takahiro Imamura
- Studio: Toei Animation
- Licensed by: NA: Discotek Media
- Released: March 3, 2001
- Runtime: 30 minutes
- Digimon franchise
- Digimon Adventure; Digimon Adventure tri.; Digimon Tamers; Digimon Frontier; Digimon Data Squad (Savers); Digimon Fusion (Xros Wars); Digimon Universe: App Monsters; Digimon Adventure (2020); Digimon Ghost Game; Digimon Beatbreak

Digimon Adventure 02 (デジモンアドベンチャー02, Dejimon Adobenchā Zero Tsū), originally released as Digimon: Digital Monsters Season 2 in English-speaking territories, is a Japanese anime television series produced by Toei Animation. It is the sequel to Digimon Adventure, and the second anime series in the Digimon franchise. The series aired in Japan from April 2000 to March 2001. It was originally licensed in North America by Saban Entertainment and aired in the US from August 2000 to May 2001.

Adventure 02 was followed by the film series Digimon Adventure tri., which was released between 2015 and 2018.

== Plot ==
Years after the events of Digimon Adventure, (Note: In the Japanese version, Digimon Adventure 02 takes place three years after Digimon Adventure. The English version changed it to take place after four years.) the Digital World is invaded by the Digimon Emperor, who is enslaving Digimon with the Dark Rings while building Control Spires that negate Digivolution. (Note: Digivolution (進化, Shinka) is the process by which a Digimon evolves into a higher-leveled, more powerful form.) To fight him, three new DigiDestined are recruited, each gaining an ancient Digimon for a partner. The three, along with T.K. and Kari, each possess a D-3, a new type of Digivice that allows them to open a gate to be transported to the Digital World through any computer. They are also given D-Terminals that hold Crest-themed Digi-Eggs that allow their Digimon partners to undergo Armor Digivolution to counter the presence of Control Spires. The Digimon Emperor, revealed to be boy genius Ken Ichijoji, flees to the Digital World. Assisted by Ken's partner, Wormmon, the DigiDestined defeat Ken.

While the DigiDestined rebuild the Digital World, Davis, Yolei, and Cody unlock normal Digivolution. At the same time, they ally themselves with a reformed Ken, who joins the team to fight Arukenimon, a Digimon who revives the Control Spires as other Digimon. When the Control Spire Digimon prove to be stronger than them, the DigiDestined learn DNA Digivolution, (Note: DNA Digivolution (ジョグレス進化, Joguresu Shinka; lit. 'Jogress Evolution') is a type of Digivolution that merges two Digimon.) which enable two champion-level Digimon to merge into a stronger ultimate-level one. When Arukenimon creates BlackWarGreymon, he begins to destroy each Destiny Stone, hoping to fight Azulongmon, who appears when each Stone is destroyed. After BlackWarGreymon flees, Azulongmon warns the DigiDestined about an impending threat behind Arukenimon and Mummymon.

During Christmas, Control Spires appear across the human world, bringing Digimon with them. While the DigiDestined set off with Imperialdramon to destroy them with the help of the international DigiDestined, Arukenimon and Mummymon begin kidnapping several children for Yukio Oikawa, a friend of Cody's father who dreams of entering the Digital World. Once the DigiDestined return to Japan, they fight the Daemon Corps, and their leader, Daemon, while Oikawa uses the Dark Spore inside Ken to implant them into the children. After Daemon is imprisoned in the Dark Ocean, BlackWarGreymon sacrifices himself to seal the portal to the Digital World at Highton View Terrace, before Oikawa and the kids can transport there.

The DigiDestined are transported to a Dream World with Oikawa and the kids and learn he was controlled by Myotismon. Myotismon splits from Oikawa and uses the energy from the Dark Spores to be reborn as MaloMyotismon. With help from the DigiDestined all over the world, the DigiDestined defeat MaloMyotismon, and Oikawa sacrifices himself to rebuild the Digital World. Twenty five years later, humans and Digimon live together.

== Development ==
Toei Animation produced Digimon Adventure 02 as a sequel to the 1999 television series Digimon Adventure. Hiroyuki Kakudō returned as the series director, and Atsushi Maekawa and Genki Yoshimura were responsible for the series composition. Katsuyoshi Nakatsuru returned as the character designer and Takanori Arisawa composed the music. Hiromi Seki was one of the producers involved in planning the series.

According to Seki, one of the main differences between the original series and Digimon Adventure 02 was the relationship between the human world and the Digital World. While the original series portrayed entering the Digital World as a dangerous journey from which the children could not easily return, the sequel allowed its protagonists to travel freely between the two worlds. Seki compared this new approach to going on a picnic rather than the more arduous adventure depicted in the first series.

Screenwriter Chiaki J. Konaka wrote the thirteenth episode, "His Master's Voice", drawing upon elements of H. P. Lovecraft's Cthulhu Mythos. In a 2026 interview, Konaka said that his work on the episode led to his appointment as the series composer for Digimon Tamers.

== Media ==
=== Anime ===
Digimon Adventure 02 aired with fifty episodes on Fuji TV between April 2, 2000, and March 25, 2001. The opening theme is "Target ~Akai Shōgeki~" (ターゲット～赤い衝撃～, Tāgetto ~Akai Shōgeki~) by Kōji Wada, which peaked at #85 on the Oricon Weekly Singles Chart. The ending themes are performed by AiM, the first half of the show being "Ashita wa Atashi no Kaze ga Fuku" (アシタハアタシノカゼガフク) and the second half being "Itsumo Itsudemo" (いつもいつでも). "Ashita wa Atashi no Kaze ga Fuku" peaked at #50 on the Oricon Weekly Singles Chart, while "Itsumo Itsudemo" charted at #93. Insert songs featured in the show include "Break up!" by Ayumi Miyazaki as the Armor Digivolution theme and "Beat Hit!" by Miyazaki as the DNA Digivolution theme. The Japanese version was streamed with English subtitles on Crunchyroll in 2008, followed by Funimation Entertainment in April 2009.

Saban Entertainment licensed the show in North America. Its English dub aired on Fox Kids in the US and YTV in Canada between August 19, 2000, and May 19, 2001, as the second season to Digimon: Digital Monsters. Much like the English version of Digimon Adventure, which was dubbed as the first season of Digimon: Digital Monsters, the original soundtrack of the show was replaced by music composed by Udi Harpaz and Shuki Levy, and the opening theme is "Digimon Theme" by Paul Gordon. Other songs featured in the show include "Let's Kick it Up", "Change into Power", and "Hey Digimon", also by Gordon. Jasan Radford also performed songs to the show, including "Run Around", "Going Digital", and "Strange." The songs, including "Digimon Theme", were released on the original soundtrack of Digimon: The Movie.

After the success of season 1 of Digimon: Digital Monsters, the producers requested the writers to add more North American jokes to the script, resulting in several revisions. Eventually, along with the result of Digimon: The Movie, this caused writers Jeff Nimoy and Bob Buchholz to leave the writing team near the end of the series' run.

Digimon Adventure 02 was streamed by Netflix along with Digimon Adventure from August 3, 2013, to August 1, 2015, in separate English dubbed and Japanese subtitled versions. Crunchyroll acquired streaming rights to the English dubbed versions, while Funimation acquired rights to the English subtitled versions. The English dubbed version of Adventure 02 briefly returned to Netflix while the English subtitled version was exclusive to Funimation.

==== Home media release ====
In Japan, Happinet released Digimon Adventure 02 in a 15th anniversary Blu-ray collection on March 2, 2016. The digitally remastered set included all 50 episodes, opening and ending sequences without credits, and a special booklet based on materials from the 2006 Digimon Chronicle Box 01 DVD release.

In North America, the New Video Group released a complete DVD collection of the English-language version on March 26, 2013. On May 28, 2024, Discotek Media released the English dub on Blu-ray, featuring all 50 episodes in a remastered edition. The original Japanese-language version with newly produced English subtitles was released on February 25, 2025, marking its first subtitled North American home video release.

In Australia and New Zealand, Madman Entertainment released a DVD collection on July 23, 2014.

=== Films ===
Several short films were screened in Japanese theaters during the show's run. A two-part featurette, Digimon Adventure 02: Hurricane Touchdown!! (デジモンアドベンチャー02 前編 デジモンハリケーン上陸！！ / 後編 超絶進化！！ 黄金のデジメンタル, Dejimon Adobenchā Zero Tsū Dejimon Harikēn Jōriku!!/Chōzetsu Shinka!! Ōgon no Digimentaru; lit. 'Digimon Adventure 02: Part 1 – Digimon Hurricane Landing!! / Part 2 – Supreme Evolution!! The Golden Digimentals') was released on July 8, 2000, as part of Toei Animation Summer 2000 Animation Fair. The film was featured along with Ojamajo Doremi#: The Movie, which was screened in between. In the film, the older DigiDestined are abducted by Wendigomon. The younger DigiDestined investigate their disappearance along with American DigiDestined Willis and his partner, Terriermon, who share a common past with Wendigomon. The July 2000 theatrical program that paired the film with the Ojamajo Doremi film grossed 1.27 billion yen in Japan. The film's ending theme song is "Stand By Me: Hitonatsu no Bōken" (スタンド・バイ・ミー～ひと夏の冒険～, Sutando Bai Mī Hitonatsu no Bōken), performed by AiM.

Hurricane Touchdown was released in North America on October 6, 2000, as the third part of Digimon: The Movie, which included Digimon Adventure (1999) and Digimon Adventure: Our War Game! (2000). The film was heavily altered, one of the cuts including the subplot where the older DigiDestined are kidnapped by Wendigomon, because Saban Entertainment lacked funding to produce a full two-hour movie. Scriptwriter Jeff Nimoy had wanted to release the movie separately as a television film, but the idea was overruled. In addition to Japanese elements being removed and North American jokes added, Willis' backstory was slightly rewritten to include that he had created Diaboromon in order to draw a connection to Digimon Adventure: Our War Game!

Digimon Adventure 02: Revenge of Diaboromon (デジモンアドベンチャー02 ディアボロモンの逆襲, Dejimon Adobenchā Zero Tsū Diaboromon no Gyakushū) was released on March 3, 2001. The story follows the DigiDestined fighting against a resurrected Diaboromon. The film was released in the United States on August 5, 2005, and was dubbed by Studiopolis and was distributed by BVS Entertainment. Discotek Media released the film on Blu-ray on December 30, 2025.

Digimon Adventure 02: The Beginning (デジモンアドベンチャー02: THE BEGINNING, Dejimon Adobenchā Zero Tsū: THE BEGINNING) was announced in late 2021. The film is set two years after Digimon Adventure: Last Evolution Kizuna, and introduces the Digidestined to Lui Owada, a boy who falls from Tokyo Tower and who claims to be the first DigiDestined, though he does not have a Digimon with him. The film premiered on October 27, 2023.

=== CD dramas ===
Various audio dramas were released onto CD in Japan, with the cast reprising their roles from the television series.

The first drama CD, Digimon Adventure 02: Drama CD: The Unknown Armor Digivolutions (デジモンアドベンチャー02 ドラマCD 未知へのアーマー進化, Dejimon Adobenchā Zero Tsū: Dorama Shīdī: Michi e no Āmā Shinka) was released on February 7, 2001, and is centered on the DigiDestined fighting Boltmon, who captures Sora, Mimi, and Kari on Valentine's Day.

Afterwards, Tobira Door (扉 DOOR) was released on April 4, 2001, and as a single from the Teen-age Wolves and features a drama track where Matt receives a letter from a fan who is about to undergo eye surgery.

The third drama CD, Digimon Adventure 02: Drama CD: The Door to Summer (デジモンアドベンチャー02 ドラマCD 夏への扉, Dejimon Adobenchā Zero Tsū: Dorama Shīdī: Natsu e no Tobira) was released on October 3, 2001, and is centered around Davis visiting Mimi and Willis during summer vacation.

Digimon Adventure 02: Original Story Spring 2003 (デジモンアドベンチャー02 オリジナル ストーリー 2003年－春－, Dejimon Adobenchā Zero Tsū: Orijinaru Sutōrī 2003nen Haru) was released on April 23, 2003, and follows the lives of each DigiDestined after the events of Digimon Adventure 02.

== Reception ==
Along with Power Rangers, Digimon Adventure 02 was one of the most popular shows on Fox Kids during its run and also contributed to the channel's high ratings, beating out competitors such as ABC, Kids' WB, and Nickelodeon.

In a retrospective review by Anime UK News in November 2016, the series received an 8 out of 10 score. The reviewer considered it an improvement over the original Digimon Adventure, praising its more focused storyline, the development of its new protagonists, and the characterization of the Digimon Emperor. The review commended BlackWarGreymon's storyline but criticized the later antagonists as less compelling. It also considered the computer-generated animation dated.
