= Digimon Adventure =

Digimon Adventure may refer to:

- Digimon Adventure (1999 TV series), the first anime series of the Digimon franchise
- Digimon Adventure (2020 TV series), the eighth anime series of the Digimon franchise and a reboot of the 1999 series
- Digimon Adventure (film), a 1999 Japanese short film
- Digimon Adventure (video game), a 2013 PSP role-playing video game
