= Hiroyuki Kakudō =

Japanese anime director (born 1959)

Hiroyuki Kakudō (角銅博之, Kakudō Hiroyuki; born September 28, 1959) is a Japanese anime director from Kitakyūshū, Fukuoka Prefecture. He graduated from Toyo University's Faculty of Letters. In 1978, while in college, he was a founding member of Group Ebisen, an independent animation production and screening group. He began working for Toei Animation in 1983, where he trained under Yugo Serikawa. He is best known for directing the first two Digimon series.

== Works ==
=== Television ===
| Year | Title | Series Director | Episode Director | Storyboard | Notes |
|---|---|---|---|---|---|
| 1984 | Wing-Man | | Yes | | |
| 1986 | Maple Town | | Yes | Yes | |
| 1986 | Okubyo na Venus | | Yes | Yes | OVA |
| 1987 | New Maple Town Stories: Palm Town Chapter | | Yes | Yes | |
| 1988 | Bikkuriman | | Yes | Yes | |
| 1989 | Shin Bikkuriman | | Yes | Yes | |
| 1990 | Be-Bop High School | | Yes | Yes | OVA |
| 1990 | RPG Densetsu Hepoi | | | Yes | |
| 1990 | Magical Taruruto | | Yes | Yes | |
| 1991 | Genji Tsūshin Agedama | | | Yes | |
| 1991 | Dragon Quest: The Adventure of Dai | | Yes | Yes | |
| 1992 | Super Bikkuriman | | Yes | Yes | |
| 1993 | NG Knight Ramune & 40 DX | Yes | Yes | Yes | OVA |
| 1993 | Slam Dunk | | Yes | Yes | |
| 1993 | Aoki Densetsu Shoot! | | Yes | Yes | |
| 1993 | Orguss 02 | | Yes | Yes | OVA |
| 1993 | Mega Man: Upon a Star | | | Yes | OVA |
| 1994 | Sailor Moon S | | Yes | Yes | OP and ED only |
| 1994 | The Legend of Snow White | | | Yes | |
| 1994 | Blue Seed | | | Yes | |
| 1994 | DNA² | | | Yes | |
| 1995 | Ninku | | | Yes | |
| 1995 | 3×3 Eyes: Legend of the Divine Demon | | | Yes | OVA |
| 1995 | The Silent Service | | | Yes | TV Special |
| 1996 | GeGeGe no Kitarō | Yes | Yes | Yes | |
| 1996 | Bakusō Kyōdai Let's & Go!! | | | Yes | |
| 1996 | Rurouni Kenshin | | | Yes | |
| 1996 | Dragon Ball GT | | Yes | Yes | |
| 1996 | Jigoku Sensei Nūbē | | Yes | Yes | |
| 1996 | Saber Marionette J | | | Yes | |
| 1997 | Cutie Honey Flash | | Yes | Yes | |
| 1997 | Pokémon | | | Yes | |
| 1997 | Slayers Try | | | Yes | |
| 1997 | あずみマンマ・ミーア | | Yes | Yes | |
| 1997 | Master of Mosquiton | | | Yes | |
| 1997 | Berserk | | | Yes | |
| 1998 | 春庭家の3人目 | | Yes | Yes | |
| 1998 | Lost Universe | | | Yes | |
| 1998 | Yu-Gi-Oh! | Yes | Yes | Yes | |
| 1998 | Himitsu no Akko-chan | | Yes | Yes | |
| 1998 | Serial Experiments Lain | | | Yes | |
| 1998 | Sorcerous Stabber Orphen | | | Yes | |
| 1998 | Gakko no Kaidan G | | | | TV Special, credited for animation |
| 1998 | Gasaraki | | | Yes | |
| 1998 | Saber Marionette J to X | | | Yes | |
| 1999 | Digimon Adventure | Yes | Yes | Yes | |
| 1999 | Turn A Gundam | | | Yes | |
| 1999 | Magic User's Club | | | | CG Animation (Avant Title) |
| 1999 | One Piece | | Yes | Yes | |
| 2000 | Boogiepop Phantom | | | Yes | |
| 2000 | Digimon Adventure 02 | Yes | Yes | Yes | |
| 2000 | Argento Soma | | | Yes | |
| 2000 | Invincible King Tri-Zenon | | | Yes | |
| 2001 | Angelic Layer | | | Yes | |
| 2001 | Digimon Tamers | | Yes | Yes | |
| 2001 | Hellsing | | | Yes | |
| 2002 | Kanon | | Yes | Yes | |
| 2002 | Digimon Frontier | | Yes | Yes | |
| 2002 | Wild 7: Another | | | Yes | |
| 2002 | Kiddy Grade | | | Yes | |
| 2003 | D.N.Angel | | | Yes | |
| 2003 | Zatch Bell! | | Yes | Yes | |
| 2003 | Hoop Days | | Yes | Yes | |
| 2003 | Requiem from the Darkness | | | Yes | |
| 2004 | Koi Kaze | | | Yes | |
| 2004 | Initial D: Fourth Stage | | | Yes | |
| 2004 | Beet the Vandel Buster | | Yes | Yes | |
| 2004 | Rockman EXE Stream | | | Yes | |
| 2004 | Black Jack | | | Yes | |
| 2005 | Transformers: Cybertron | Yes | | Yes | |
| 2005 | Beet the Vandel Buster: Excellion | | Yes | Yes | |
| 2006 | BakéGyamon | | | Yes | |
| 2006 | Higurashi When They Cry | | | Yes | |
| 2006 | Kamisama Kazoku | | Yes | Yes | |
| 2006 | Powerpuff Girls Z | Yes | Yes | Yes | Unaired pilot version only |
| 2006 | Super Robot Wars Original Generation: Divine Wars | Yes | | Yes | |
| 2006 | 独占取材！私だけが知っている小泉純一郎 | | | Yes | TV Special |
| 2007 | GeGeGe no Kitarō | | Yes | Yes | |
| 2007 | Skull Man | | | Yes | |
| 2008 | Hakaba Kitarō | | Yes | Yes | |
| 2008 | Negibozu No Asataro | | Yes | Yes | |
| 2009 | Marie & Gali | | | Yes | |
| 2009 | Kaidan Restaurant | | Yes | Yes | |
| 2009 | Welcome to Irabu's Office | | Yes | Yes | |
| 2010 | Marie & Gali ver.2.0 | | | Yes | |
| 2010 | Digimon Xros Wars | | Yes | Yes | |
| 2011 | Toriko | | Yes | Yes | |
| 2011 | Ring ni Kakero (Season 4) | | Yes | Yes | |
| 2011 | C (TV series) | | | Yes | |
| 2012 | Saint Seiya Omega | | Yes | Yes | |
| 2012 | Tsuritama | | | Yes | |
| 2012 | Tanken Driland | | | Yes | |
| 2013 | Saint Seiya Omega (season 2) | | Yes | Yes | |
| 2013 | Gatchaman Crowds | | | Yes | |
| 2013 | Kyousougiga | | Yes | Yes | |
| 2014 | Majin Bone | | Yes | Yes | |
| 2014 | Marvel Disk Wars: The Avengers | | Yes | Yes | |
| 2014 | The Kindaichi Case Files R | | Yes | Yes | |
| 2014 | World Trigger | | Yes | Yes | |
| 2015 | Dragon Ball Super | | | Yes | |
| 2015 | The Kindaichi Case Files R (season 2) | | Yes | Yes | |
| 2016 | Grimgar of Fantasy and Ash | | | Yes | |
| 2016 | Tiger Mask W | | Yes | Yes | |
| 2017 | Kirakira Pretty Cure a la Mode | | Yes | Yes | |
| 2018 | Hug! Pretty Cure | | Yes | Yes | |
| 2018 | GeGeGe no Kitarō | | Yes | Yes | |
| 2018 | Kiratto Pri Chan | | | Yes | |
| 2019 | Star Twinkle PreCure | | Yes | Yes | |
| 2020 | Healin' Good Pretty Cure | | Yes | Yes | |
| 2020 | Dragon Quest: The Adventure of Dai | | Yes | Yes | |
| 2021 | Tropical-Rouge! Pretty Cure | | Yes | Yes | |
| 2021 | Digimon Ghost Game | | Yes | Yes | |
| 2023 | Ippon Again! | | | Yes | |
| 2023 | Tōsōchū: The Great Mission | | Yes | Yes | |

=== Films ===
| Year | Title | Director | Storyboard | Notes |
|---|---|---|---|---|
| 1983 | Patalliro! Stardust Keikaku | | | Production Assistant |
| 1988 | Bikkuriman: Taiichiji Seima Taisen | Yes | Yes | |
| 1991 | Magical Taruruto-kun: Moero! Yūjō no Mahō Taisen | Yes | Yes | |
| 1993 | Rokudenashi Blues 1993 | Yes | Yes | |
| 1995 | Slam Dunk: Shohoku's Greatest Challenge! | Yes | Yes | |
| 2002 | Turn A Gundam I: Earth Light | | Yes | Compilation Film |
| 2002 | WXIII: Patlabor the Movie 3 | | Yes | |
| 2005 | Digital Monster X-Evolution | Yes | Yes | |
| 2006 | Origin: Spirits of the Past | | Yes | |
