= Digimon Adventure (1999 TV series) =

1999 television anime created by Akiyoshi Hongo

- デジモンアドベンチャー
- Genre: Adventure, isekai
- Created by: Akiyoshi Hongo
- Developed by: Satoru Nishizono
- Directed by: Hiroyuki Kakudō
- Music by: Takanori Arisawa
- Country of origin: Japan
- Original language: Japanese
- No. of episodes: 54 (list of episodes)

Production
- Production companies: Fuji Television; Yomiko Advertising; Toei Animation

Original release
- Network: Fuji Television
- Release: March 7, 1999 – March 26, 2000

Related
- Related articles
- Digimon Adventure (film); Digimon Adventure: Our War Game!; Digimon: The Movie; Digimon Adventure 02; Digimon Adventure tri.; Digimon Adventure: Last Evolution Kizuna; Digimon Adventure (2020)

Digimon Adventure (Japanese: デジモンアドベンチャー, Hepburn: Dejimon Adobenchā), also known as Digimon: Digital Monsters Season 1 in English-speaking territories, is a 1999 Japanese anime television series produced by Toei Animation in cooperation with WiZ, Bandai and Fuji Television. It is the first anime series in the Digimon media franchise, based on the Digital Monster virtual pet released in 1997.

Digimon Adventure began production 1.5 months after the film of the same name was being produced, and it began broadcast in Japan a day after the film's theatrical release on March 7, 1999, airing until its conclusion on March 26, 2000. It was then followed up with the 2000 film Digimon Adventure: Our War Game!. Both films were adapted and released in North America as Digimon: The Movie on October 6, 2000.

With the success of Digimon Adventure, a sequel television series, Digimon Adventure 02, was broadcast from 2000 to 2001. For the series' 15th anniversary, a six-part film series titled Digimon Adventure tri. was released between 2015 and 2018, and a final film titled Digimon Adventure: Last Evolution Kizuna was released in 2020. In 2020, the series was rebooted and released under the title Digimon Adventure.

== Plot ==
On August 1, 1999, seven children from Odaiba, Tokyo, Japan, are transported into the Digital World by Digivices that appeared before them at summer camp, where they befriend several Digimon (Digital Monsters). The children's Digivices (Note: A Digivice (デジヴァイス, Dejivaisu), based on Bandai's Digital Monster virtual pet toy, is a digital device that the DigiDestined use to enter the Digital World and help their Digimon partners Digivolve.) allow their partner Digimon to Digivolve (Note: Digivolution (進化, Shinka) is the process by which a Digimon evolves into a higher-leveled, more powerful form.) into stronger forms and combat enemies. As the children explore to find a way home, they learn that they are "DigiDestined", children chosen to save the Digital World. During their adventure, the DigiDestined are hunted by Devimon, who uses black gears to corrupt various Digimon into attacking the group. After defeating Devimon, the DigiDestined are contacted by Gennai and instructed to reach the Server Continent to retrieve artifacts called Crests, allowing their Digimon partners to Digivolve into their Ultimate forms. During this time, they are targeted by Etemon.

After Etemon is defeated, the DigiDestined learn from Gennai that there is an eighth DigiDestined child, who Myotismon is entering the real world to kill. The DigiDestined follow after Myotismon to the real world. After discovering that the eighth child is Tai's younger sister, Kari, and that Myotismon's lieutenant Gatomon is her Digimon partner, the DigiDestined are able to defeat Myotismon. However, the boundaries between the real world and Digital World are intersecting, forcing them to return to the Digital World.

The DigiDestined face the Dark Masters, a quartet of mega-level Digimon who each took control of a part of the Digital World in their absence. In the midst of their battles, they learn that they were chosen to save the real and Digital Worlds from intersecting four years ago. Tension leads to infighting within the group and causes them to temporarily separate. After reflecting, the DigiDestined reunite to defeat the last Dark Master, and confront Apocalymon, the mastermind who plotted to destroy both worlds. Apocalymon destroys their Crests, but the DigiDestined realize the power of their Crests was inside them all along as they have already unlocked their powers and manage to defeat him. With the Digital World restored, Tai and his friends leave their Digimon partners behind and return to their normal lives.

== Development ==
Digimon Adventure originated from a proposal by Bandai to Toei Animation to produce a television series based on the Digital Monster virtual pet toys developed by WiZ. According to producer Hiromi Seki, Bandai hoped that an anime adaptation would improve sales of the toys. Seki proposed introducing human protagonists who could interact with the monsters, allowing audiences to relate to the characters and develop an emotional attachment to the Digimon. The production team also decided to link the Digimon's evolution to the personal growth of their human partners, making character development a central element of the narrative.

Seki was assigned to the project while simultaneously preparing another original Toei Animation series, Ojamajo Doremi. She later recalled that the assignment presented a significant production challenge because she was responsible for developing two television series concurrently.

The series was directed by Hiroyuki Kakudō, with Satoru Nishizono responsible for series composition and Katsuyoshi Nakatsuru designing the human characters. Monster designs were developed in collaboration with Kenji Watanabe, one of the creators of the original virtual pets. Seki recalled holding regular meetings with Watanabe about the monsters, while consulting Nakatsuru approximately once a week about the human characters.

== Media ==
=== Anime ===
Digimon Adventure was produced by Toei Animation and ran for 54 episodes on Fuji TV between March 7, 1999, and March 26, 2000. The main opening theme for all episodes aired in Japan is "Butter-Fly" by Kōji Wada, which peaked at #47 on the Oricon Weekly Singles Chart. "I Wish" by Ai Maeda, Mimi's voice actress, is used as the ending theme from episodes 1–26, while "Keep On", AiM's fifth single, served as the ending theme from episodes 27–54. The series also uses three insert songs: "Brave Heart" by Ayumi Miyazaki as the Digivolution theme, "Seven" by Kōji Wada, and "Yūki o Tsubasa ni Shite" (勇気を翼にして) by Toshiko Fujita, Tai's voice actress, as Tai's theme song. On August 1, 2014, during the series' 15th anniversary, a Blu-ray Disc box of the original series was announced was released in Japan on March 15, 2015, by Happinet Pictures.

Saban Entertainment licensed the series in North America and produced an English-language version under the title Digimon: Digital Monsters. It premiered on Fox Kids Network on August 14, 1999. The series was also broadcast in Canada on YTV. The English version featured an original soundtrack and made changes to character names, as well as edits pertaining to certain aspects such as violence to make the series more suitable for younger audiences. Wendee Lee, Michael Sorich and David Walsh became the voice directors. The original soundtrack of the show was replaced by music composed by Udi Harpaz and Shuki Levy, which recycled several music soundtracks from Starcom: The U.S. Space Force, Masked Rider and Spider-Man: The Animated Series. The opening theme for all episodes is "Digimon Theme" by Paul Gordon. "Hey Digimon" by Gordon, an insert song featured in the show, was released on the original soundtrack of Digimon: The Movie along with "Digimon Theme".

==== Home media release ====
To commemorate the series' 15th anniversary, Happinet released a digitally remastered Blu-ray collection of Digimon Adventure in Japan on March 3, 2015. The collection included all 54 episodes, promotional commercials, opening and ending sequences without credits, selected original broadcast episode previews, and a booklet. The limited first-production edition also included a newly recorded drama CD with two stories featuring members of the original Japanese voice cast.

In North America, the complete English-language version was released on DVD by New Video Group on October 9, 2012. Discotek Media subsequently released a remastered Blu-ray edition of the English dub on December 27, 2022, followed by the original Japanese-language version with English subtitles on July 25, 2023.

On March 6, 2021, a combined Japanese Blu-ray collection containing all 104 episodes of Digimon Adventure and Digimon Adventure 02, together with four associated theatrical productions, was released.

=== Films ===
Several short films based on the series were released in theaters in Japan. Digimon Adventure was originally released on March 6, 1999. The story focuses on Tai and Kari finding a Digi-egg from their computer, which hatches and quickly Digivolves, culminating in a battle. The film grossed ¥650 million.

Digimon Adventure: Our War Game! was originally released on March 4, 2000. In the film, the DigiDestined find a virus Digimon who Digivolves into who infects the Internet. The film introduces DNA Digivolution. The film grossed ¥2.166 billion. Our War Game! later served as the inspiration for director Mamoru Hosoda's film Summer Wars.

The two short films were combined with Digimon Adventure 02: Part 1: Digimon Hurricane Landing!! / Part 2: Supreme Evolution!! The Golden Digimentals and was released as Digimon: The Movie in North America on October 6, 2000. Digimon: The Movie was altered from the original script to remove "culturally awkward" Japanese elements and introduced jokes suitable for a North American audience. Originally, scriptwriter Jeff Nimoy wanted to combine Digimon Adventure and Our War Game! while releasing Digimon Hurricane Landing / Supreme Evolution!! The Golden Digimentals as a direct-to-television movie, but the idea was overruled. In order to connect the film's stories, the script was rewritten.

Digimon Adventure 3D: Digimon Grand Prix! (デジモンアドベンチャー3D デジモングランプリ!, Dejimon Adobenchā: Dejimon Guran Puri), a stereoscopic 3D short film, was shown at Toei Animation Festival on October 3, 2009, and was later included on a set of DVD works released on February 21, 2010.

=== Video games ===
Characters and Digimon from Adventure appear throughout many video games based on the franchise, such as Digimon Rumble Arena.

An RPG based on the original storyline of Adventure developed by Prope and published by Namco Bandai Games, also title Digimon Adventure, was released for the PlayStation Portable on January 17, 2013, part of the line-up of video games of the 15th-anniversary celebration of the franchise. The game covers the entire series as well as the second Japanese film, Bokura no War Game, and sees the return of all the main voice actors. The game also features original story elements and an unlockable dungeon mode featuring sequel protagonists in the franchise.

=== Other media ===
Other media adaptions include a manhua released in 2000, drawn by Yu Yuen-wong, and its sequel. The manhua was originally published in Hong Kong, by Rightman. In total it was published in five volumes. Tokyopop published the series in English in the United States, while Chuang Yi did so in Singapore.

A North American 12 issue adaption of the first arc of the show was published by Dark Horse Comics. A novelization was written by the Digimon Adventure screenwriter, Hiro Masaki and series director Hiroyuki Kakudō. The light novels were separated into three parts. Four Drama CDs were also released between 1999 and 2003.

== Reception ==
On its initial release, the series found a rather large success in the United States. When it was first released in North America, the series was seen as an attempt to imitate the success of Nintendo's Pokémon franchise. Entertainment Weekly magazine named Digimon as the "Worst Pokémon/Net Crossbreeding Attempt" in 2000. However, praise was later directed towards the realistic interactions and development of its child characters compared to those of the contemporary Pokémon anime, as well as the improved English dubbing and complex science fiction and social themes introduced in later seasons.

Despite the criticism, it placed first at the start of the May 2000 Nielsen ratings sweeps, surpassing Pokémon: Adventures on the Orange Islands among viewers aged 2–11 and 6–11. Retailers and businesses such as snack food company Jel Sert and toy store chain Toys "R" Us capitalized on the popularity of the series by licensing it for promotion with their own products. Web search engine Lycos listed Digimon as the number five fad of 2000, and it ranked 35th on the list of the year's top searches.

In TV Asahi's poll of the Top 100 Anime, Digimon came in 54th. On Anime News Network, Luke Carroll gave the Digimon: Digital Monsters - Collection 2 DVD an overall grade of D+.

== Legacy ==
In 2024, Toei Animation organized a series of events in Japan to commemorate the 25th anniversary of the series, including an exhibition in Tokyo and Osaka, revival screenings of the original theatrical films, and a newly animated commemorative video set to Koji Wada's opening theme song "Butter-Fly". The video premiered in Shinjuku, Tokyo, on August 1, 2024, coinciding with the franchise's annual Odaiba Memorial Day celebrations.
