= Zeno Robinson =

American voice actor (born 1993)

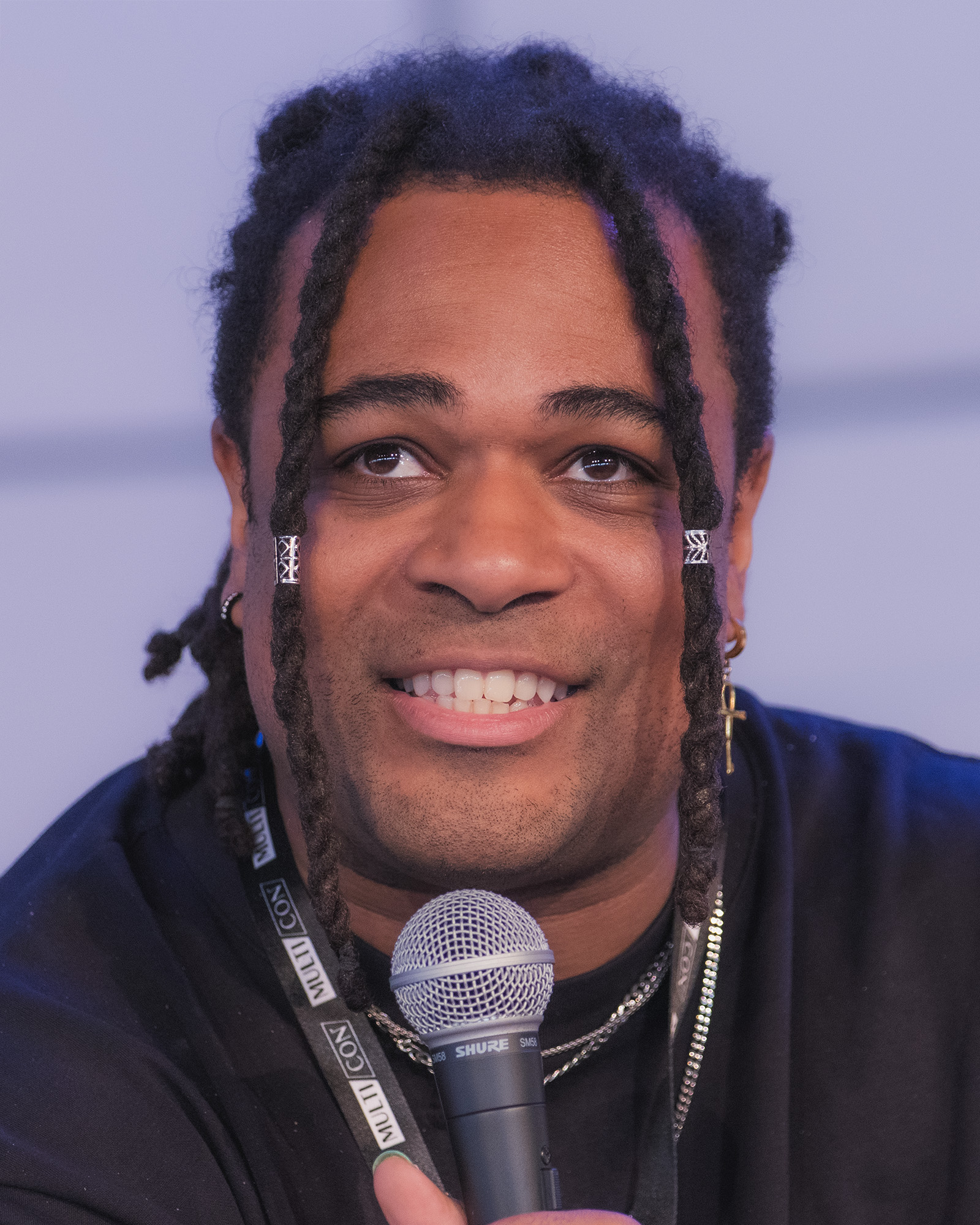
- Robinson in 2026
- Born: Zeno Anthony Robinson; October 25, 1993 (age 33); Los Angeles, California, U.S.
- Occupation: Voice actor
- Years active: 2008–present
- Notable credits: Young Justice as Cyborg / Victor Stone; My Hero Academia as Keigo Takami / Hawks; Pokémon Journeys: The Series as Goh; The Owl House as Hunter / Golden Guard; Akudama Drive as Brawler; Street Fighter 6 as Dee Jay; Gachiakuta as Jabber Wonger
- Awards: Best English voice actor performance at the 2021 Crunchyroll Anime Awards

Zeno Anthony Robinson (born October 25, 1993) is an American voice actor. His most notable roles include Cyborg/Victor Stone in Young Justice, Hawks in My Hero Academia (for which he won Best Voice Artist Performance (English) at the 2021 Crunchyroll Anime Awards), Goh in Pokémon Journeys: The Series, Sethos in Genshin Impact, Remy Remington in Big City Greens, Hunter/Golden Guard in The Owl House, and as Jabber Wonger in Gachiakuta.

== Filmography ==
=== Anime ===
Year	Title	Role	Notes	Ref.
2016	One-Punch Man	Superalloy Blackluster		
2018	Aggretsuko	Bakkun, Game Store Clerk		
2019	Cannon Busters	Kelby		
2019	Fire Force	Ogun Montgomery		
2019–24	Demon Slayer: Kimetsu no Yaiba	Genya Shinazugawa		
2020–23	Pokémon Journeys: The Series	Goh		
2020–25	My Hero Academia	Deidoro Sakaki, Keigo Takami / Hawks		
2020	The Misfit of Demon King Academy	Zepes Indu		
2020	Fire Force	Ogun Montgomery		
2020–21	I'm Standing on a Million Lives	Yūsuke Yotsuya		
2021–present	Re:Zero − Starting Life in Another World	Garfiel Tinzel		
2021–present	Black Clover	Zenon Zogratis		
2021–present	Tokyo Revengers	Shuji Hanma		
2021	Kuroko's Basketball	Taiga Kagami		
2021	SK8 the Infinity	Shokichi Oka		
2021	Sakura Wars: The Animation	Reiji Shiba		
2021	High-Rise Invasion	Rika Honjō		
2021	The Hidden Dungeon Only I Can Enter	Noir Stardia		
2021	Shironeko Project Zero Chronicle	Prince of Darkness		
2021	B: The Beginning	Kazan		
2021	Bungo and Alchemist	Osamu Dazai		
2021	86	Kiriya Nouzen		
2021	Resident Evil: Infinite Darkness	Zombies, additional voices		
2021	Scarlet Nexus	Kaito Sumeragi		
2021	King's Raid: Successors of the Will	Riheet		
2021	2.43: Seiin High School Boys Volleyball Team	Kohei Tokura		
2021	Super Crooks	Forecast		
2021–23	Horimiya	Toru Ishikawa		
2021–24	Attack on Titan	Onyankopon		
2021–22	The Case Study of Vanitas	Vanitas		
2022	LBX Girls	Nate		
2022	Odd Taxi	Taichi Kabasawa		
2022	Tokyo 24th Ward	Ran Akagi		
2022	Bastard!! Heavy Metal, Dark Fantasy	Lars Ul Metallicana, Maron		
2022–23	One Piece	Charlotte Raisin		
2022–present	Bleach: Thousand-Year Blood War	Nanana Najahkoop, Pepe Waccabrada, Yūshirō Shihōin		
2023	Digimon Adventure	Tai Kamiya		
2023	Zom 100: Bucket List of the Dead	Akira Tendo		
2024–present	Pokémon Horizons: The Series	Roy's Fuecoco / Crocalor / Skeledirge, Rotom Phone		
2024–25	Go! Go! Loser Ranger!	Fighter D		
2025–present	Beyblade X	Ciel Kaminari / Blader Z		
2025–present	Gachiakuta	Jabber Wonger		
2025–present	Tougen Anki	Shiki Ichinose		
2025–present	Digimon Beatbreak	Tomoro Tenma		
2025	Digimon Ghost Game	GulusGammamon, Regulusmon, Petermon, additional voices		
2026–present	Jujutsu Kaisen	Hajime Kashimo		
2026–present	Witch Hat Atelier	Custas		

=== Animation ===
Year	Title	Role	Notes	Ref.
2008	Ben 10: Alien Force	Alan Albright	Recurring role	
2010	Ben 10: Ultimate Alien	Alan Albright	Recurring role	
2017	Spider-Man	Randy Robertson	Recurring role	
2018	Craig of the Creek	Carter, Omar / Green Poncho		
2018	Lego Star Wars: All Stars	Lando Calrissian	Episode: "Dealing with Lando"	
2018–present	Big City Greens	Remy Remington	Recurring role	
2019	Young Justice	Cyborg / Victor Stone, Holocaust / Leonard Smalls, Steel / John Henry Irons, Dale Gunn, Marv Evers	Recurring role	
2020	Zuzubaland	Rocky Cocoa		
2020	Animaniacs	Jay-Pac, Defensive Fan 1, Gordon		
2020, 2022	The Casagrandes	Chuck	2 episodes	
2021–2022	Supa Strikas: Rookie Season	Shakes Mokena	12 episodes	
2021–2022	Mermaid High	Josh	Recurring role; webseries	
2021–2023	The Owl House	Hunter / Golden Guard, Derwin	Recurring role	
2021–present	Miraculous: Tales of Ladybug & Cat Noir	Nino Lahiffe / Carapace, Max Kanté / Pegasus	Recurring role; replaced Benjamin Diskin for both roles.	
2022	Amphibia	Young Andrias	Episode: "The Core & the King"	
2022	Baymax!	Ali	Episode: "Sofia"	
2022	Link Click	Lu Guang	Chinese donghua; English dub	
2022	The Loud House	Male Student, Boy Stealing Chips, Kid Chewing Gum, Chet	3 episodes	
2022	Cars on the Road	Lance the Writer, Additional voices		
2022	Transformers: EarthSpark	Thrash Malto	Main Role	
2022	Interrupting Chicken	Aladdin	Episode: "Where's the Party/Chicken Out West"	
2022, 2025	Chibiverse	Remy Remington, Pebble	3 episodes	
2023	Harley Quinn	Deliveryman, Dock Worker, The Flash		
2024	Star Wars: Tales of the Empire	Ahmar	Episode: "Devoted"	
2024–2026	Max & the Midknights	Simon, Harold, Samuel, Bingo Caller, Villager #1		
2025	Your Friendly Neighborhood Spider-Man	Harry Osborn	7 episodes	
2026	X-Men '97	Synch	Season 2	
2026	Knights of Guinevere	Krash/Isaiah	Episode: "Wolves Around the Corner"	
2026	Strawberry Vampire	Preston	Episode: "Bat Franny"	

=== Live-action ===
Year	Title	Role	Note	Ref.
2023	Ultraman Z	Haruki Natsukawa	English dub	
2023	Yu Yu Hakusho	Karasu	English dub	
2025	The Comic Shop	Keith Hendricks		

=== Video games ===
Year	Title	Role	Notes	Ref.
2017	Friday the 13th: The Game	Brandon Wilson		
2019	Fire Emblem Heroes	Ross, Zihark, Fogado		
2020	My Hero One's Justice 2	Keigo Takami / Hawks		
2020	Monster Prom 2: Monster Camp	Abdu		
2020	Crash Bandicoot 4: It's About Time	Ika-Ika (downer half)		
2020	Marvel's Spider-Man: Miles Morales	The Underground		
2020	Puyo Puyo Tetris 2	Squares		
2021	Ys IX: Monstrum Nox	Tito		
2021	Scarlet Nexus	Kaito Sumeragi		
2021	Cris Tales	Cristopher		
2021	Nier Reincarnation	Rion		
2021	Cookie Run: Kingdom	Mint Choco Cookie, Eclair Cookie		
2021	Tales of Arise	Nayth		
2021	Demon Slayer: Kimetsu no Yaiba – The Hinokami Chronicles	Genya Shinazugawa		
2021	Solar Ash	Ahrric		
2022	Horizon Forbidden West	Vetteh		
2022	Rune Factory 5	Cecil		
2022	Neon White	Raz		
2023	Fire Emblem Engage	Fogado		
2023	Mato Anomalies	Pointed Hat		
2023	Street Fighter 6	Dee Jay		
2023	The Texas Chain Saw Massacre	Sonny Williams		
2023	Disgaea 7: Vows of the Virtueless	Yeyasu		
2023	Silent Hope	Archer		
2023	Asgard's Wrath 2	Wahka		
2024	Granblue Fantasy Versus: Rising	Vane		
2024	Granblue Fantasy: Relink	Vane		
2024	Persona 3 Reload	Junpei Iori		
2024	Genshin Impact	Sethos		
2024	Sand Land	Additional voices		
2024	Demon Slayer: Kimetsu no Yaiba – Sweep the Board	Genya Shinazugawa	DLC	
2024	The Legend of Heroes: Trails Through Daybreak	Leon Balthazar, citizens		
2024	My Hero Ultra Rumble	Keigo Takami / Hawks	DLC	
2024	Stranger Things VR	Lucas Sinclair		
2024	Batman: Arkham Shadow	Ben Turner / Bronze Tiger, Doody, CO Scott		
2025	Dragon Ball: Sparking! Zero	Majuub, Gamma 2	DLC	
2025	The Legend of Heroes: Trails Through Daybreak II	Leon Balthazaar, citizens		
2025	Rune Factory: Guardians of Azuma	Lord Ura, Sora, additional voices		
2025	Yakuza 0 Director's Cut	Additional voices		
2025	Shadowverse: Worlds Beyond	Hnikar of the Firestorm Duo		
2025	Date Everything!	Henry Hoove		
2025	Demon Slayer: Kimetsu no Yaiba – The Hinokami Chronicles 2	Genya Shinazugawa		
2025	Towa and the Guardians of the Sacred Tree	Enka, Tengen, Male 2		
2026	The Legend of Heroes: Trails Beyond the Horizon	Leon Balthazar		
2026	My Hero Academia: All's Justice	Keigo Takami / Hawks		
2026	Yakuza Kiwami 3 & Dark Ties	Rikiya Shimabukuro, additional voices		
2026	Monster Hunter Stories 3: Twisted Reflection	Len		
2026	Halloween: The Game	Thomas Armitage		
2026	Fire Emblem: Fortune's Weave	Cai		
2026	Grand Theft Auto VI	The Local Population		

=== Films ===
Year	Title	Role	Notes	Ref.
2016	Cyborg 009: Call of Justice	Cyborg 008		
2019	Mobile Suit Gundam Narrative	Delao		
2020	Dragon Quest: Your Story	Prince Harry		
2020	My Hero Academia: Heroes Rising	Keigo Takami / Hawks		
2021	The Mitchells vs. the Machines	Sean (Unboxer)		
2021	Burn the Witch	Roy B Dipper		
2021	Stand by Me Doraemon 2	Middle School Students		
2021	Josee, the Tiger and the Fish	Hayato Matsūra		
2021	Diary of a Wimpy Kid	Pete Hosey		
2022	Dragon Ball Super: Super Hero	Gamma 2		
2022	Batman and Superman: Battle of the Super Sons	Jimmy Olsen, Melvin Masters		
2022	Turning Red	Additional voices		
2023	Legion of Super-Heroes	Invisible Kid, Brainiac 3		
2023	Ladybug & Cat Noir: The Movie	Nino Lahiffe, Max Kanté	English dub	
2023	The First Slam Dunk	Kiminobu Kogure		
2024	Big City Greens the Movie: Spacecation	Remy Remington, additional voices		
2024	Mobile Suit Gundam SEED Freedom	Shura Serpentine		
2024	Godzilla Minus One	Additional voices	English dub	
2024	Inside Out 2	Additional voices		
2025	Elio	Additional voices		
2025	Demon Slayer: Kimetsu no Yaiba – The Movie: Infinity Castle	Genya Shinazugawa	English dub	

== Awards and nominations ==
Year	Award	Category	Work/Recipient	Result	Ref.
2021	5th Crunchyroll Anime Awards	Best Voice Artist Performance (English)	Hawks (My Hero Academia)	Won	
2023	7th Crunchyroll Anime Awards	Best Voice Artist Performance (English)	Gamma 2 (Dragon Ball Super: Super Hero)	Nominated	
