= Digimon Adventure (2020 TV series) =

Japanese anime television series

- Promotional poster
- デジモンアドベンチャー
- Genre: Adventure; Science fantasy
- Created by: Akiyoshi Hongo
- Developed by: Atsuhiro Tomioka
- Directed by: Masato Mitsuka
- Music by: Toshihiko Sahashi
- Country of origin: Japan
- Original language: Japanese
- No. of episodes: 67 (list of episodes)

Production
- Producers: Matsuki Ebana (Fuji TV); Naoko Sagawa (Yomiko); Hiroyuki Sakurada (Toei Animation); Gyo Takami (Toei Animation)
- Production companies: Fuji Television; Yomiko Advertising; Toei Animation

Original release
- Network: Fuji Television
- Release: April 5, 2020 – September 26, 2021

Related
- Digimon franchise
- Digimon Adventure; Digimon Adventure 02; Digimon Adventure tri.; Digimon Tamers; Digimon Frontier; Digimon Data Squad (Savers); Digimon Fusion (Xros Wars); Digimon Universe: App Monsters; Digimon Ghost Game; Digimon Beatbreak

Digimon Adventure (Japanese: デジモンアドベンチャー:, Hepburn: Dejimon Adobenchā; stylized as Digimon Adventure:) is a Japanese anime television series. It is the eighth anime series in the Digimon franchise and a reboot of the 1999–2000 anime television series of the same name that follows the adventures of children in the world of Digimon, struggling to prevent a series of disasters spreading into the real world.

It was broadcast for 67 episodes on Fuji TV from April 2020 to September 2021, while the series was simulcasted worldwide through Crunchyroll. In February 2022, it was announced that the series would receive an English dub. All 67 episodes of the dub were made available for purchase on the Microsoft Store in April 2023 and on VOD with Hulu in July 2023.

== Plot ==
In 2020, a series of cyber-attacks across Tokyo are the result of catastrophic events in another world within the internet, the Digital World, where creatures called Digimon roam. Taichi "Tai" Kamiya, a young boy gets transported to the internet and meets Agumon while they are attacked by a swarm of Argomon. They meet up with Yamato "Matt" Ishida and his partner Gabumon and together they defeat a Mega-level Argomon as Omnimon with help from Koushirou "Izzy" Izumi.

While getting ready for summer camp, Tai, Matt, Izzy, Sora Takenouchi, Mimi Tachikawa and Joe Kido are transported to the Digital World's Cloud Continent where they acquire Digivices and Digimon partners while learning of an ancient war that the Dark Digimon Army have resurfaced from their defeat to take over the Digital World with their Soundbirdmon corrupting Digimon into their service. They learn that they have been chosen as DigiDestined to stop the Dark Digimon army and save two captive Celestial Digimon they need to fight alongside with. A member of the Dark Digimon Army named Ogremon pursues the group out of a grudge towards Tai and Agumon, only to sacrifice himself to protect them while directing their group to the place where one of the Celestial Digimon were held. Due to a pool of miasma, the Digidestined and their partner Digimon separate in two groups to reach the other side and unlock their partners' ultimate forms along the way.

The DigiDestined regroup as they are lured into a fake Tokyo dimension created by Eyesmon, a Digimon whose attack on the Network is affecting the real Tokyo. The DigiDestined battle Eyesmon as it digivolves to Orochimon and then Nidhoggmon while commencing a countdown to annihilate Tokyo. Omnimon was able to destroy Nidhoggmon in time, but are separated by the Dark Digimons' commander Devimon. Tai and Matt find Takeru "T.K." Takaishi, Matt's younger brother, while aiding a freedom fighter named Leomon in taking out Devimon's minons. They are then join Celestial Digimon Angemon, revealed to be T.K.'s Digimon partner before his Digiegg is kidnapped by SkullKnightmon, a subordinate of Devimon's who later Digivolves to AxeKnightmon to battle them. Tai's group mount an assault of Devimon's castle, revealed to be an enslaved Digimon named Eldradimon, to rescue the Digiegg that hatched into Patamon while Agumon manages to destroy Devimon in an epic battle that nearly turned him into Machinedramon.

Meanwhile, back in the Real World, the remaining Digidestined track their Digimon Partners inside the internet on Izzy's computer where they battle a Calmaramon and several more Argomon who are hijacking the internet. They are joined by Kari, Tai's younger sister, as she helps reunite them with Tai and Matt as they all end up on the Eternal Continent. But they encounter AxeKnightmon, who takes an interest in Kari while separating the group after a brief fight with Angemon. Tai and Sora learn of a plot to resurrect the Dark Digimons' powerful weapon Millenniumon from Lopmon, a reincarnation of Cherubimon, who provides them with a Komondomon as their transport. The Digidestinated gradually reunite while preventing Kari and AxeKnightmon from being used a vessel for Millenniumon, AxeKnightmon revealed Gatomon to be the other Celestial Digimon. Becoming Kari's Digimon partner, Gatomon offers his aid in leading the DigiDestined to the Sealed Grounds where the largest fragment containing Millenniumon's essence is located.

As Tai and Matt unlock their partners' their ability to assume mega form, they, T.K. and Izzy are abducted by Sakkakumon, a servant of Millenniummon who pits them against replicas of previous opponents. T.K. and Angemon were confronted by a reconstituted Devimon, revealed to be Angemon's darkness as he is absorbed so Angemon would regain his full power and free everyone. But by the time the DigiDestined reached the Sealed Grounds, the Vademon cultists use Sakkakumon's collected data on Agumon to create Machinedramon to fight the children while releasing the miasma from Cloud so Sakakkumon can absorb it and transform into Millenniumon's vessel. The restored Millenniummon attempts to destroy the entire Digital World, but was defeated by WarGreymon when he receives additional power from his comrades along with the hopes of the friendly Digimon the DigiDestined befriended in their adventure.

Despite Millenniummon's defeat, the DigiDestined learn they must discover the true power of the Crests in their Digivices to stop Negamon, the mastermind behind of the ancient war and recent events who evolved beyond its programming from the data it had Argomon and Eyesmon gather from the humans, who seeks to destroy everything in The Great Catastrophe. The group unlock their Digimons' mega forms while learning they need to consciously manifest Omnimon. Tai and Agumon were suddenly ambushed by the Argomon again, and this time meet a humanoid Argomon sent by Negamon to test Tai and Agumon's bond. The children reunite as they face a swarm of Soundbirdmon that digivolve to their true form, the Dark Army's leader Ghoulmon. After Ghoulmon's defeat, Negamon was freed and commences the Great Catastrophe. The DigiDestined confront Negamon after defeating Argomon, engaging with the Digimon as it digivolves to Abbadomon and deletes half of the Digidestined with Tai, Kari, T.K. and Matt continuing to fight Negamon. The hopes of the humanity restore the four children back into their physical forms and enable Agumon and Gabumon to fuse into Omnimon. Tai, Matt, and Omnimon enter Abaddomon where they confront the core body. After a great battle, assuming a new form his opponent cannot counter, Omnimon reduces Abaddomon to a Digi-Egg and peace of both worlds were restored.

In the epilogue, upon Abaddomon's defeat, the Digimon in the Digital World celebrate the victory. The DigiDestined return home accompanied by their Digimon partners in secret, with Izzy and Mimi working hard on an interdimensional portal program allowing transit between both worlds, while Tai chose to remain in the Digital World to explore it there with Agumon.

== Production ==
=== Background ===
The series was officially announced in the March issue of Shueisha's V Jump magazine in January 2020. The project was developed independently and in the same period of time as the theatrical release of Digimon Adventure: Last Evolution Kizuna, by producer Hiroyuki Sakurada and series director Masato Mitsuka, initially together behind Digimon Fusion and Dragon Ball Super. Matsuki Hanae and Naoko Sagawa are also the producers, Atsuhiro Tomioka is supervising the series scripts, Katsuyoshi Nakatsuru returns from Digimon Adventure to design the characters, Akihiro Asanuma is the chief animation director, Ryouka Kinoshita is the art director, Toshiki Amada is in charge of art setting.

The opportunity of a reboot of the original Digimon Adventure series was hoped for since the days of Digimon Adventure tri. by Hiroyuki Sakurada, then producer of Dragon Ball Super. Sakurada expressed that the stopping point of the original Adventure series reached on its twentieth anniversary by Last Evolution Kizuna was "sad", but opportune to be able to propose, produce this reboot and deliver it in its current form, terming it as a proper Digimon entry that wasn't for the "children of the past", but for a new generation of children "And in order to introduce it to them, what better way to do it than to start from the beginning one more time with Digimon Adventure?" while mentioning the difficulties encountered to find the right timing back then, as the production team wanted to broadcast Digimon again on Fuji TV at 9 a.m. on Sunday morning "To secure that timeslot and produce content for it, you need the right timing and right elements for all sorts of things. Without such a close gamble, it's difficult to produce a TV anime". The franchise was dropped from Fuji TV after its initial popularity waned in 2001, as well as tougher commercial competition over the years.

The original Digimon Adventure staff, working on the movie Last Evolution Kizuna, was not consulted for this project. Masato Mitsuka was referred to as a director "representing the younger generation"; "He ensures the future of Toei Animation, as well as the rest of its staff," said Hiroyuki Sakurada.

=== Development ===
Hiroyuki Sakurada indicated that the highlights of this series would be the battle scenes, the "special trait" of each Digimon and how they would deal with the abilities of the Digimons that will attack them. Atsuhiro Tomioka announced that as many different Digimon as possible will be shown, defining it as a festival "according to the situation, without holding back".

"Our important task is to make sure things come across to the viewer as cool" stated Masato Mitsuka and specified that, although they were very enthusiastic about wanting to show off the pride of a Digimon of the Champion-level, they had trouble thinking about how to portray "cool" action sequences using the physics of the Digimon and especially Greymon, compared to Son Goku and his panoply of attacks in the director's work on Dragon Ball Super; Mitsuka also claimed in August 2020 that the Digimon will reach the Ultimate-level very quickly, so in the long run, the time Agumon will actively spend as a Greymon will be gone; calling Omnimon one of the most impressive "symbols" of Digimon to this very day with many derivatives. Its appearance and the when and how in the series were determined even before Mitsuka was brought into the project.

In response to the Japanese media outlet What's In, calling the first three episodes "A start close to be a cinematic project, yet chaotic" by the story developments; Sakurada said that the intention behind it was to display freshness without waiting. For Mitsuka, the overuse of privileged segments in the animation for a TV anime was to show Greymon; and Omnimon looking "cool" from its first fight, in order to leave just as much of a strong impression on those new viewers as on the old ones, a proper action-like depiction of it being uncommon in the previous projects, special circumstances protecting it for very particular moments, this production aimed to depict Omnimon as the miracle that appears after overcoming great difficulties "May each of its appearances in this new TV series be a chance to make it fight powerful enemies, while displaying his strength and a status of crisis saviour". Mitsuka wanted to portray children actively fighting in the fights, a story in which the children participate with a keen awareness of what they have to save. "The children feel an obligation and a determination to "do something" ... The central theme of the series' direction is "a person and a creature" in both battle and adventure. It is the "way of life" that seduces me, my vision of the link between the two".

Producer Sakurada invited children to have the feeling of traveling through this anime "even if they are stuck at home ... From the jungle to the oceans, discover a vast world without constraints"; by experiencing things that had become difficult due to the COVID-19 pandemic, in August 2020. Atsuhiro Tomioka has been called to be the main screenwriter of the project, with the request of Toei Animation to take the manga Digimon Adventure V-Tamer 01 as a reference. "Of course, [Tai] still works together with other allies, but we want him to be a heroic figure with a strong sense of responsibility and dependability. It's a willingness with the director and the production team to mix influences".

The show premiered on April 5, 2020, on Fuji TV. In mid-2020, Toei Animation Europe listed Adventure for 66 episodes. On September 2, 2021, a 67th episode was announced. Two weeks later it was confirmed the series would end with 67 episodes and be succeeded by Digimon Ghost Game.

=== Marketing ===
On March 30, 2020, Toei Animation organized an advertising campaign at Shibuya Stream, a retail complex in Tokyo's Shibuya district and in the Shibuya Station with posters and animations. On March 19, 2021, Toei Animation unveiled a new key visual that hinted at new digivolved forms appearing within the series; with new taglines: "Everything of 'Digimon Adventure:' is Epic! The story reaches its climax!" and a marketing campaign based on the buzzword "Epic" (アツい, atsui) on social media.

== Broadcast and distribution ==
Digimon Adventure: premiered on Fuji TV on April 5, 2020; On April 19 of the same year, Toei Animation announced that the fourth scheduled episode and new episodes would be delayed due to the COVID-19 pandemic. A delay of about two months occurred until the return of the show; from April 26 to May 31, 2020, GeGeGe no Kitarō reruns in Digimon Adventure: timeslot. Episodes were rebroadcast from the first episode beginning June 7. Toei Animation later announced on June 19 that the series would resume broadcasting new episodes starting with episode 4 on June 28. The series ended on September 26, 2021, with a total of 67 episodes and was succeeded by Digimon Ghost Game, at the same time slot on Fuji TV.

Crunchyroll began streaming the series starting April 4, 2020. On February 26, 2022, the Digimon Con 2022 event announced that the series is getting an English dub that would star Zeno Robinson as Tai and Ben Diskin as Agumon, through a dubbed trailer and two videos of the voice actors. Tai's original English actor, Joshua Seth, revealed that the cast was informed by the producers months ago that they would be recasting everyone and that no one from the old cast would be returning. The first two episodes aired as a special preview at Toei Animation's booth at the Anime NYC 2022 event on November 19, 2022. In February 2023, it was announced the English dub had finished production; and all episodes were made available for purchase in one batch at once on the Microsoft Store on April 13 of the same year. On July 1, 2023, Digimon Adventure in English becomes available on Hulu.

=== Soundtrack ===
Composer Toshihiko Sahashi was commissioned to write forty compositions by the director of the series. The idea explored was sounds played by a large orchestra. A first recording was conducted on February 25, 2020. Two soundtrack albums were released by Nippon Columbia. The first volume on September 30, 2020, featuring 34 tracks and the second volume on August 25, 2021, for 31 tracks.

The opening theme for the series is "Mikakunin Hikousen", performed by Takayoshi Tanimoto in Japanese and Hans Hessburg in English. Tanimoto also sung three Insert Songs. The first is "Be The Winners", which is the theme song for the Champion level digivolutions, the second is "X-treme Fight", which is the theme song for the Ultimate level digivolutions and the third is "Break the Chain", which is the theme song for the Mega level digivolutions.

In Japanese, the first ending theme during episodes 1–13 is "Kuyashisa wa Tane" by Chiai Fujikawa. The second ending theme during episodes 14–26 is "Q?" by Reol. The third ending theme during episodes 27–38 is "Mind Game" by Maica n. The fourth ending theme during episodes 39–54 is "Overseas Highway" by Wolpis Carter, with lyrics co-written with and music composed by Orangestar. The fifth ending theme during episodes 55–67 is "Dreamers" by the K-pop boy band Ateez.

The English version, for the first time in series history, dubbed over opening and ending theme songs from the original Japanese version rather than make their own songs. Rather than dub over all of them though, they only dubbed over two of the five ending songs and used those two songs during its duration rather than the five. "Kuyashisa wa Tane", sung by Cristina Vee, was used in episode 1–38, while "Overseas Highway", sung by Jenny Karr, were used in episode 39–67. The other three ending themes were not used due to licensing issues.

=== DVD/Blu-ray ===
Digimon Adventure: was distributed in Japan on DVD and Blu-ray by Happinet: in a first box set on December 2, 2020, containing the first 12 episodes. Episodes 13 to 24 were released in a second box set on March 3, 2021. Episodes 25 to 36 were released in a third box set on June 2, 2021. Episodes 37 to 48 were released in a fourth box set on September 3, 2021. Episodes 49 to 67 were released in a fifth, and final, box set on February 2, 2022.

== Reception ==
=== Critical response ===
First impressions of the series' debut episodes were mostly positive-to-mixed with production values being praised; although criticized for noticeably recycled plot beats from previous productions and specifically the Digimon movie Our War Game!, Polygon's Karen Han felt that Masato Mitsuka's take lacked a sense of character, both in terms of the world it takes place in, and the characters themselves. and Joshua Graves of Comic Book Resources feels that "it comes across more as a disservice to fans". Most critics were puzzled by the general approach and shared some concerns about the way the show can keep the stakes presented meaningful, due to the pace, the lack of introductions and exposition about the overall concept and the digivolutions as anything other than regarded as a "senseless plot boost" in this early stage. As the series goes on, these apprehensions were reflected more factually in the opinions of pop culture and anime media.

Throughout its simulcast, Digimon Adventure received harsh responses and criticism through its run and, getting panned due to the narrative structure and the lack of motivating ideas of the plot, as well as the writing of its characters and their dynamics developments throughout more than forty episodes. An excessive focus on the protagonist Tai Kamiya was emphasized. Writing for Comic Book Resources, Laura Thornton criticized its reintroduction of some talking Digimon after thirty episodes for essentially portraying them as victims to be protected by Tai rather than making them proper characters with a culture or unique problem and stated it as fatigued story "not only for its characters but for the audience as well", by a lack of "light-hearted" episodes, considering that constant spectacle of over-the-top fights "has long grown stale" compared to models such as My Hero Academia or Avatar: The Last Airbender; Some late "filler" episodes received a more favorable critical reception for their more episodic, calm and humorous tone.

Digimon Adventure was regarded as based on stylistic references for an acquired audience; the commercial target was considered ambiguous; Manga-News then questioned the legitimacy of such regarding the intentions of Last Evolution Kizuna. For Alex Cline of AIPT Comics, the cause was the public responses to the iterations that followed the first series and differed from the usual formulas; Cline pointed out the presence of monsters and antagonists that have "never been animated before" while deploring their anecdotal usage. Digimon Adventure was named one of "The Worst Anime of 2020" by Anime News Network in their year-end selection; termed as a failure and a wasted attempt, criticizing the lack of planning of the staff behind it. The marketing positioning was compared to that of the Dragon Ball brand in the 2010s. Adventure was part of the reboots & revivals craze seen in the early 2020s.

==== Public response ====
Responses from fans and spectators would be observed by various media and the international broadcaster as very mixed through its run. Promotional images of episode 38 "The Blazing Blue Friendship", depicting crucifixions; went viral; spreading via memes from fans and nostalgics.

Daniel Dockery, senior writer for Crunchyroll expressed his understanding of viewers' disappointment due to, among other things, the excessive focus on Tai and said that the series doubled down on the aspects that the creators found to be the most appealing "Namely the idea of [Tai] as a hero and the Digimon as combatants. I understand it if isn't everyone's cup of tea".

Although the producer's ambition was to bring the franchise back "for a new generation of children"; Toei Animation declared that the series "struggled to acquire new audiences of children" in May 2021, the official reason given was the COVID-19 pandemic.

=== TV ratings ===
Six episodes can be seen in the TV Rankings of Japanese Animation: Episode 6 "The Targeted Kingdom", on July 12, 2020 (for 2.9% rating), episode 11 "The Wolf Standing Atop the Desert", on August 16, 2020 (for 2.3% rating), episode 40 "Strike! The Killer Shot", on March 21, 2021 (for 2.6% rating), episode 58 "Hikari New Life", on July 25, 2021 (for 1.9% rating), episode 59 "Bolt, HerakleKabuterimon", on August 1, 2021 (for 2.3% rating), and episode 60 "Vikemon Ventures the Glaciers", on August 8, 2021 (for 1.5% rating). Due to the spread of COVID-19, from April 26 to May 31, 2020, it was Kitarō (2018) that was temporarily rerun in the slot of Digimon; the repeats of the first episodes of Adventure: and its pilot aired from June 7, 2020, with unranked ratings.
