= Tai Kamiya =

Fictional character in the Digimon franchise

Taichi "Tai" Kamiya
- Digimon character
- Taichi in the 1999 Digimon Adventure anime television series.
- First appearance: Digimon V-tamer (1998)
- Portrayed by: Gaku Matsumoto (stage play)
- Voiced by: English: Joshua Seth; Jason Spisak (Revenge of Diaboromon (2005)); Zeno Robinson (2020 TV series); Japanese: Toshiko Fujita (1999 TV series & 02); Natsuki Hanae (tri. & Last Evolution Kizuna); Yuko Sanpei (2020 TV series)

In-universe information
- Nationality: Japanese

Taichi "Tai" Kamiya, known as Taichi Yagami (Japanese: 八神 太一, Hepburn: Yagami Taichi) in Japan, is a fictional character in the multimedia franchise Digimon. He first appeared in the Digimon Adventure V-Tamer 01 manga, where he is sent to the Digital World to meet his Digimon companion Zeromaru, in order to save it from multiple enemies. An alternate version of Tai appears in Toei Company's 1999 series as the main protagonist of Digimon Adventure, a supporting character in Digimon Adventure 02 and once again as the protagonist of the films Digimon Adventure tri. and Digimon Adventure: Last Evolution Kizuna. In this timeline, Tai is the leader of the first season DigiDestined. He is adventurous and a born leader, and is usually the first to spring into action. He is partnered with the dinosaur-like Agumon in the Digimon Adventure anime series.

Tai was created by manga author Tenya Yabuno from V-Tamer 01. Multiple voice actors have voiced him across the franchise. Critical reception to Tai has been positive by writers from manga and anime websites. While his role and personality in the first Digimon series has been positive, writers expressed mixed thoughts about Tai's characterization in Tri due to lacking his hotblooded personality.

== Conception and development ==
Tai's original character was designed by Tenya Yabuno, one of the authors of manga V-Tamer 01. He was based on Kentarou Kamon, the protagonist of the Digimon manga pilot, C'mon Digimon. While creating the Digimon Adventure short, director Mamoru Hosoda wanted to focus on Tai and Kari's relationship with Koromon, the Digimon that appeared in their house, but did not want to portray it as friendship, instead portraying Digimon as dangerous creatures.

Satoru Nishizono and the other staff members picked Tai's name using a name analysis software, where they chose kanji that related to "luck." While Tai was conceptualized as the main character, Toei wanted to focus on all the Digidestined children at the same time resulting in an ensemble cast. Nishizono stated that with the exception of Tai and Agumon, Toei was told to make in-depth young characters to fit the series' viewers. The staff considered Tai to remain as a protagonist for Digimon Adventure 02, but he ended up as a supporting character instead. For Digimon Adventure: Our War Game!, Hosoda wanted to focus on Tai's naivete through his nervousness on interacting with Sora despite needing her help. While finding Tai's actions out of character, Hosoda wanted Tai to try his best to apologize with Sora.

For tri., Keitaro Motonaga stated the staff at Toei devised multiple scenarios to compare how he aged with his previous appearances. The staff also focused on his rivalry with Matt Ishida, due to how differently the two matured. Motonaga also commented that Tai was in a stage where he thought he would not be a teenager, which changed his characterization. In the Digimon Adventure tri. series, Tai's teenage appearance was designed by Atsuya Uki.

In Japan, Tai's appearances were voiced by Toshiko Fujita. During auditions, the staff immediately chose her as they were fans of her work. Fujita liked Tai's character, due to how he cares for his sister and for his clumsy personality. She did not find difficulty in voicing Tai for the first series. She also liked the relationship between Tai and Agumon, believing it to be one of the best from the anime based on their similarities For tri, Fujita was replaced by Natsuki Hanae, who had been a fan of the series since he was a child and enjoyed Tai's character based on his bravery and sense of justice. He rewatched the first anime and the film before auditioning. at the same time pressured. When reading the script, Hanae noted Tai was different due to how he aged and felt this change was natural.

In the North American English dub, the character was renamed to Tai Kamiya. Rita Majkut, one of the producers of the English dub, stated that the change from Tai's original last name, Yagami, was not intentional and that it had resulted from a translation error. Joshua Seth provides his voice. He did not find any impressions, during his audition for the character with comments on how he was close to the people in the cast. He felt Tai was similar to him so he "pitched up [his voice] little bit younger". Additionally, he stated he enjoyed voicing the character. However, by the time the film Revenge of Diaboromon was dubbed in English, he had retired from the voice acting industry in 2005, causing casting director Jeff Nimoy to cast Jason Spisak as his replacement, remarking how similar he sounded to Seth. Seth commented that his regular is very similar to the one from Tai in Tri was not difficult as he initially thought he had to "warm" up to the character.

== Appearances ==
In the V-Tamer 01 story line, Tai is a V-Pet trainer whose Digimon partner is a Veedramon that is named Zeromaru. Ending up in the Digital World after being summoned by MagnaAngemon, Tai accepts to aid in saving the Digital World from Daemon. During his adventures, Tai encounters Davis after he ended up in his universe, Ryo Akiyama, and Takuya Kanbara. Nearly two decades after his manga series ended, a one shot cross over was released in which this Tai meets the 2020 Tai.

In the anime, Tai first appears in the 1999 film Digimon Adventure before appearing in the television series of the same name. In the television series, he is transported to the Digital World with six other children, where they learn that they are "DigiDestined", children who were selected to save both worlds. He becomes the DigiDestined's leader. His aggressive and impulsive personality often puts him in danger, but he learns that empathy and compassion are the keys to being a successful leader. He is partnered with Agumon and holds the Crest of Courage (勇気の紋章, Yūki no monshō). In Tai's daily life, he is the star player on the school's soccer team.

In Digimon Adventure 02, Tai becomes a middle school student. He passes his goggles to Davis Motomiya, as he and the original group act as mentors and support to the new DigiDestined. In the series epilogue, set in 2027, Tai becomes a United Nations diplomat for the Digital World. In the Digimon Fusion series, 11-year old Tai appears in the final arc of the series when summoned from his universe in his eleven-year-old form to aid the Fusion Fighters.

In Digimon Adventure tri., Tai and his friends attend Tsukishima General High School. They learn from their teacher and agent, Daigo Nishijima, that a mysterious virus is infecting every Digimon, and causing distortions between the human world and the Digital World.

In Digimon Adventure Last Evolution - Kizuna, Tai attends college and is twenty-two.

In the 2020 reboot of Digimon Adventure, Tai plays a similar role to his original series counterpart. At the end of the series, he chooses to remain in the Digital World with Agumon.

Tai appears in several Digimon video games released by Namco Bandai.

In Japan, several image songs were released under Tai's name. "Yuki wo Tsubasa ni Shite" (勇気を翼にして) was performed by Toshiko Fujita and released on March 24, 2000, on the compilation CD album Digimon Adventure: Best Hit Parade. For Digimon Adventure 02, a character CD single was released on June 21, 2000, under Tai's name and contained his theme song, "Atarashi Taiyo" (新しい太陽) and a duet with Agumon titled "Team", with Fujita providing Tai's voice once again. On August 1, 2009, a CD album titled Digimon 10th Anniversary: The Bridge to Dreams (デジモン 10th ANNIVERSARY -夢への架け橋-) was released to celebrate the show's 10th anniversary, with Fujita returning to perform "Towa ni Tsuzuke!!" (永久に続け!!) under Tai's name. For Digimon Adventure Tri, Tai's theme song, "Eien no Puzzle" (永遠のパズル), was performed by Natsuki Hanae and was released in the compilation album Digimon Adventure tri. Character Songs: DigiDestined version (デジモンアドベンチャー tri.キャラクターソング「選ばれし子どもたち編」) on April 10, 2017, which peaked at #74 on the Oricon Weekly Charts.

Tai appears in the audio dramas, Digimon Adventure Original Story: 2½ Year Break and Digimon Adventure 02 Original Story: 2003 -Spring- (both released only in Japan).

Tai is portrayed by Gaku Matsumoto in the 2.5D musical stage play.

Angela Anaconda features Angela wearing a caricature of Tai's attire in the episode "Good Seats", which first appeared in Digimon: The Movie.

== Critical reception ==
In a series of online polls conducted on Toei Animation's Digimon website, Tai was ranked 3rd by Japanese voters as their favorite DigiDestined. When the same question was asked three more times, his rank fell to 6th, rose to 4th, and finally landed at 5th. IGN listed him as 62nd best animated character, praising his ability to admit his mistakes and his relationship with his Digimon partner, Agumon, which made one of the most popular characters from the '90s. In a poll he was voted as the 5th "Which catcher/trainer would take home the gold?"

Multiple writers for manga and anime have commented on Tai's character. IGN listed how Tai forces Agumon to evolve into SkullGreymon as one of the best moments from the first Digimon anime. Additionally, Tai and Koromon's brief return to the real world as listed as another moment due to Tai's brief interactions with his younger sister, Kari. Crunchyroll agreed, finding this episode showed Tai's flaws for the first time in the anime and how it resulted in SkullGreymon's evolution. Anime News Network highly praised Tai's character in the first series due to how he matures as a kid due to how he takes care of his sister, most notably when she was sick and he got tired of seeing her inside the house while her parents were busy at work. Additionally, the site commented on Tai and Yamato's misrelationship due to their multiple differences that made them often clash. Retro Junk liked how he looks after his group and that despite his issues, his friends respect him. THEM Anime Reviews liked the rivalry between Tai and Yamato, citing that at the same time both are similar characters due to the two of them being big brothers who are often worried about their siblings. The same site also praised Joshua Seth for making Tai more appealing. Adam "OMEGA" Arnold from Animefringe praised the amount of focus given to Tai's character in the trilogy film Digimon: The Movie alongside other present characters. Shamus Kelley from Den of Geek also acclaimed Seth's acting in the movie due to the multiple emotions Tai shows across the trilogy as well as how the character tries to handle his relationship with Sora. In the book Anime Classics Zettai!: 100 Must-See Japanese Animation Masterpieces, Brian Camp stated that Tai's apparent relationship with Sora who is later revealed to be interested into Matt was well handled as due to the characters' ages in contrast to other Western series.

Tai's characterization in Tri. resulted in mixed comments by Jacob Hope Chapman from Anime News Network due his new hesitations which might not appeal to viewers of the series. While feeling it as part of Tai's character arc, Christian Chiok from Japanator found Tai's traits out of character contrasting previous Digimon main characters. However, there were positive comments by Shamus Kelley from Den of Geek, who approved of Tai's new character arc, noting that Tri focuses on personal responsibility and his potential for character growth. DVDTalk's writer Chris Zimmerman praised the still ongoing arguments between Tai and Yamato in Tri as fans from the first Digimon series would still find it memorable due to the history between these two characters. Otaku USA noted the arguments between these two characters as well and stated "Tai is actually the character who seems to be suffering from arrested development the most". Kelley complained about Tai and Yamato's still ongoing conflict in the next films, commenting there were already enough in the first film and the possibility that Tai did not have character development in such movie. For the next film, Kelley readdressed such issues that were more present in the movie. In a Coexistence review, Anime Now's Richard Eisenbeis believes Tai managed to fully mature during the climax of the film due to his decisions in regards to who is the enemy, contrasting the original series where it was more obvious where Tai, as a kid, could easily be the enemy.
