= Maica n =

Japanese pop singer

Maica_n
- Born: September 14, 2000 (age 25); Saga Prefecture, Japan
- Genres: J-Pop, Rock, Pop-rock
- Years active: 2019-
- Label: Victor Entertainment (2019-)
- Website: maica-official.jp

YouTube information
- Channel: Maica_n
- Years active: 2020 -
- Subscribers: 15 thousand
- Views: 3.9 million
- Last updated: August 4, 2026

Maica_n (マイカ, Maika), is a Japanese singer-songwriter, who made major debut in 2020 and is currently signed under B Zone company, however releasing music through Victor Entertainment.

In 2019, she released mini album Himitsu through recording store Tower Records's recording label On the same year she made stage appearance on the free-live session Onto. In 2020, she made major debut with the EP Unchained. Her 2020 single Mind Game served as a theme song to the television series Digimon Adventure. In 2021, she released her full-length album replica. In November 2023, Maica made guest appearance at the Japan Culture-Con festival held at Dubai, United Arab Emirates. It became her first oversea stage appearance since debut.

== Discography ==
As of the 2023, she has released 10 digital singles, 1 mini album, 1 EP and 1 studio album.

=== Digital singles ===
Year	Single	Reference
2020	"Flow"	
2020	"Love and Wash"	
2020	"Missing angel rock/acoustic version"	
2020	"Memo Kaki" (メモ書き)	
2020	"Mind Game"	
2021	"Replica"	
2021	"Bloody Mary"	
2022	"Tsuki ga Namida wo Nagasu Yoru" (月が涙を流す夜)	
2022	"Love song"	
2023	"Kiss and Kiss"	
2024	"The bumpy road anthem"	
2025	"Sakura Hitohira" (サクラヒトヒラ)	

=== Albums ===
Title	Album details	Peak chart positions
Title	Album details	JPN Oricon
Himitsu (秘密)	Released: 5 June 2019; Label: Tower Record; Formats: CD, digital download, streaming	268
Replica	Released: 17 February 2021; Label: Victor Entertainment; Formats: CD, digital download, streaming	149

=== EP ===
Title	Album details	Peak chart positions
Title	Album details	JPN Oricon
Unchained	Released: 20 May 2020; Label: Victor Entertainment; Formats: CD, digital download, streaming	92
