= Digimon Ghost Game =

Japanese anime television series

- Promotional poster
- デジモンゴーストゲーム
- Genre: Adventure; Horror; Supernatural
- Created by: Akiyoshi Hongo
- Developed by: Masashi Sogo
- Directed by: Masatoshi Chioka; Masato Mitsuka
- Voices of: Mutsumi Tamura; Miyuki Sawashiro; Yū Kobayashi; Kazuya Nakai; Akira Ishida
- Music by: Kow Otani
- No. of episodes: 67 + 1 special (list of episodes)

Production
- Producers: Matsuki Ebana (Fuji TV); Koya Watanabe (Fuji TV); Naoko Sagawa (Yomiko); Hiroyuki Sakurada (Toei Animation); Shintaro Hashimoto (Toei Animation)
- Production companies: Fuji Television; Yomiko Advertising; Toei Animation

Original release
- Network: Fuji Television
- Release: October 3, 2021 – March 26, 2023

Related
- Digimon franchise
- Digimon Adventure; Digimon Adventure 02; Digimon Adventure tri.; Digimon Tamers; Digimon Frontier; Digimon Data Squad (Savers); Digimon Fusion (Xros Wars); Digimon Universe: App Monsters; Digimon Adventure (2020 TV series); Digimon Beatbreak

Digimon Ghost Game (Japanese: デジモンゴーストゲーム, Hepburn: Dejimon Gōsuto Gēmu) is a Japanese anime television series produced by Toei Animation, and the ninth anime series in the Digimon franchise. The series was broadcast on Fuji TV from October 2021 to March 2023. An English dub of the series premiered on BBC iPlayer in the United Kingdom in December 2025.

== Plot ==
In the near future, new, innovative, and more advanced technology has emerged. On social networks, rumors are circulating about strange phenomena caused by beings known as "Hologram Ghosts". Hiro Amanokawa is a middle school freshman at Hazakura Academy, who, after activating a mysterious device left behind by his father called the "Digivice -V-", can now see creatures called Digimon that cannot be seen by ordinary people.

After meeting Gammamon, a mischievous Digimon entrusted to him by his father Hokuto, Hiro becomes caught up in various strange phenomena. A man with a sewn mouth steals time from humans, a mummy wanders around at night and kidnaps humans... the Hologram Ghosts are all around us and are targeting us. Alongside their friends Ruli Tsukiyono and Angoramon, and later Kiyoshirō Higashimitarai and Jellymon, Hiro and Gammamon dive into the mysterious world where these creatures live—a side of the world nobody is aware of.

== Characters ==
=== Main characters ===
Hiro Amanokawa (天ノ河 宙, Amanokawa Hiro)
Voiced by: Mutsumi Tamura (Japanese); Greg Vinciguerra (English)
A thirteen-year-old boy and a first-year middle school student who attends the private Hazakura Academy. He is reliable and never turns down requests, and because he can do most things independently, others often rely on him. He is also curious and inquisitive, and becomes interested in Digimon after meeting Gammamon through his father Hokuto. Due to his upbringing, he tends to suppress his childish side while being energetic and caring around others. He has a scar on his left ear.
Gammamon (ガンマモン, Ganmamon)
Voiced by: Miyuki Sawashiro (Japanese); Deneen Melody, Zeno Robinson (GulusGammamon) (English)
Hiro's partner, a white Triceratops Rookie-level Digimon with small wings on his back. Gammamon possesses three Champion-level forms: the Ceratopsian BetelGammamon, the blue Ceratopsian KausGammamon, and the cannon-horned quadrupedal Certaopsian WezenGammamon, each with their own strengths and weaknesses. He later gains the power to evolve further into the Certatopsian/dragon Ultimate-level Canoweissmon and the Ceratopsian/dragon/Tyrannosaurus Mega-level Siriusmon. Gammamon also has a dark Champion-level Ceratopsian form called GulusGammamon, revealed to the original personality that manifests whenever the rookie is consumed by sadness or rage. Near the end of the series, digivolving into the dragon-like Ultimate-level Regulusmon, GulusGammamon is revealed to be the series antagonist as he created the corruptive GRB (Gulus Realm Burst) particles with the intent to create an army of empowered Digimon to ravage the Digital World. Thanks to Gammamon's quick thinking, he managed to split off from Regulusmon and defeats his other half as Siriusmon. With his ideals used against him, GulusGammamon accepts the conditions of surrender and undoes the GRB infection while absorbed by Siriusmon.
Ruli Tsukiyono (月夜野 瑠璃, Tsukiyono Ruri)
Voiced by: Yū Kobayashi (Japanese); Cat Protano (English)
A first-year middle school student attending a combined middle and high school for girls. A friendly and outgoing thirteen-year-old who runs a popular occult-related social media account, she is sociable and has many friends. She looks for things that suit her taste, and one of her hobbies is playing the piano, which Angoramon likes to listen to. Although she is skilled at many things, she struggles to find a main passion and therefore feels bored with life.
Angoramon (アンゴラモン)
Voiced by: Kazuya Nakai (Japanese); Ryan Colt Levy (English)
Ruli's partner, an Angora rabbit-like Rookie-level Beast Digimon with a pacifistic personality, who enjoys the sound of Ruli playing the piano. He can evolve into the humanoid rabbit Champion-level SymbareAngoramon, the rabbit/owl Ultimate-level Lamortmon, and the rabbit-masked humanoid Mega-level Diarbbitmon.
Kiyoshirō Higashimitarai (東御手洗 清司郎, Higashimitarai Kiyoshirō)
Voiced by: Akira Ishida (Japanese); Sean Chiplock (English)
A 14-year-old genius who graduated from an American school and currently attends Hazakura Academy to enjoy living as a regular boy. He is afraid of ghosts and is always looking for talismans to ward them off. Although usually condescending and cowardly, he occasionally becomes brave and level-headed when in a crisis.
Jellymon (ジェリーモン, Jerīmon)
Voiced by: Yū Shimamura (Japanese); Triya Leong (English)
A jellyfish-like Rookie-level Mollusk Digimon and Kiyoshirō's partner, whom she likes to scare and cause mischief towards. She can evolve into the humanoid jellyfish Champion-level TeslaJellymon, the humanoid jellyfish Ultimate-level Thetismon, and the cyborg Mega-level Amphimon.
Espimon (エスピモン, Esupimon)
Voiced by: Yumiko Kobayashi (Japanese); Analesa Fisher (English)
A jetpack-themed Rookie-level Digimon who helps Gammamon rescue Hiro when he is under the influence of a Doumon. Hokuto tasked him with helping Hiro, and so he is looking for Hiro going off of his student ID. Even after meeting Hiro, he keeps looking for him since he is convinced he is not the real Hiro, but is unaware that he has already found him. When Hiro reveals that he is who Espimon is looking for, Espimon becomes Hiro's second partner, able to evolve into the Champion-level HoverEspimon.

=== Digimon ===
The following Digimon have appeared as ghosts that the group have to deal with.

==== Supporting Digimon ====
Clockmon (クロックモン, Kurokkumon)
Voiced by: Mitsuo Iwata (Japanese); Joe Hernandez (English)
A clock-themed Champion-level Digimon who initially targeted humans using his time-based abilities that forwards a creature's lifespan. This ability works on animals and plants. He is also known as the "Sewn-Lip Man" by people online. He becomes an ally to Hiro's group after he is defeated.
Mummymon (マミーモン, Mamīmon)
Voiced by: Takayuki Sugō (Japanese); Blythe Melin (English)
A mummy Ultimate-level Digimon who becomes an ally to Hiro's group after a misunderstanding about his methods of healing humans is resolved.
Bokomon (ボコモン)
Voiced by: Yūsuke Numata (Japanese); Sean Burgos (English)
A Rookie-level Digimon who aids Hiro's group before being killed by Sealsdramon. His death causes Gammamon to fall into despair, which is what first triggers his ability to Digivolve to GulusGammamon.
Tapirmon (バクモン, Bakumon)
Voiced by: Dorah Fine
A Baku-themed Rookie-level Digimon who is Bokomon's protégé.
MoriShellmon (モリシェルモン, Morisherumon)
Voiced by: Taiki Matsunos (Japanese); Paul Ganus (English)
A Sazae-oni-themed Digimon who resembles a green version of Shellmon. It lives near the Fuji West Campsite.
Monzaemon (もんざえモン, Monzaemon)
Voiced by: Miyu Irino
A teddy bear-themed Digimon.
Ryudamon (リュウダモン, Ryūdamon)
Voiced by: Masami Kikuchi (Japanese); Brian Anderson (Ryudamon, Gyukimon), Clifford Chapin (Ginryumon) (English)
A dragon/samurai-themed Rookie-level Digimon who became the ushi-oni-themed Gyuukimon (ギュウキモン, Gyūkimon) after entering the Human World. Gammamon is able to defeat Gyukimon and revert him back to his original form. Later on in the series, he permanently Digivolves to the samurai-armored dragon-themed Ginryumon (ギンリュウモン, Ginryūmon).
Airdramon (エアドラモン, Eadoramon)
Voiced by: Ryōtarō Okiayu (Japanese); Sean Burgos (English)
An Amphiptere Champion-level Digimon who Ruli befriends. He is also used as transportation for Hiro's group.
Pumpkinmon (パンプモン, Panpumon)
Voiced by: Yasuhiro Takato (Japanese); Jacob Browning (English)
A pumpkin/stuffed toy-themed Digimon that wishes to be seen and make friends with humans.
Candlemon (キャンドモン, Kyandomon)
Voiced by: Yuuki Hirosi (Japanese); Emi Lo (English)
A candle-themed Digimon that assists Pumpkinmon.
Ekakimon (エカキモン, Ekakimon)
Voiced by: Keitaro Tanaka (Japanese); Blythe Melin (English)
A colored pencil-themed Digimon that assists Pumpkinmon.
Terriermon Assistant (テリアモン助手, Teriamon Joshu)
Voiced by: Aoi Tada (Japanese); Abby Espiritu (English)
A terrier/scientist-themed Rookie-level Digimon who was Hokuto's partner during his time in the Digital World.
Quantumon (クオンタモン, Kuontamon)
Voiced by: Saori Hayami
A Mega-level Digimon who is the ruler of the Digital World and seeks peace between it and the human world. She is also known as the "voice", who was calling Digimon into the human world.

==== Antagonistic Digimon ====
Dracmon (ドラクモン, Dorakumon)
Voiced by: Kōki Miyata (Japanese); Javier Prusky (English)
A Dracula/imp-themed Rookie-level Digimon who caused trouble before aligning himself with Myotismon, only for Myotismon to destroy him after he defies his orders to not harm Ruli.
Majiramon (マジラモン, Majiramon)
Voiced by: Katsuhisa Hōki
A Chinese dragon-themed Digimon with a centaur-like build.
Quetzalmon (クアトルモン, Kuatorumon)
A Quetzalcōātl-themed Digimon who works for Majiramon.
Oryxmon (ゴートモン, Gōtomon)
A goat-themed Digimon who works for Majiramon.
Rabbitmon (ビットモン, Bittomon)
A rabbit-themed Digimon who works for Majiramon.
Sirenmon (セイレーンモン, Sairēnmon)
Voiced by: Nana Mizuki (Japanese); Abby Espiritu (English)
A siren-themed Digimon.
Crowmon (ヤタガラモン, Yatagaramon)
Voiced by: Yasunori Masutani
A Yatagarasu-themed Ultimate-level Digimon who controls birds at night and flies away after being defeated by KausGammamon.
MetalPhantomon (メタルファントモン, Metarufantomon)
Voiced by: Hisao Egawa (Japanese); Blythe Melin (English)
A floating robotic Grim Reaper-themed Digimon.
Weedmon (ザッソーモン, Zassōmon)
Weedmon Voiced by: Mitsuki Nakamura (Japanese); Joe Hernandez (English)
Patriarch Weedmon Voiced by: Tomomichi Nishimura (Japanese); Ken Clement (English)
A weed-themed Champion-level Digimon which is a grayish-green version of Vegiemon. They spread by hacking into computers, and fought Gammamon as WezenGammamon until their elder leader intervenes.
Kinkakumon (キンカクモン, Kinkakumon) and Ginkakumon (ギンカクモン, Ginkakumon)
Kinkakumon Voiced by: Yuka Komatsu (Japanese); Jesse Vilinsky (English)
Ginkakumon Voiced by: Tetsu Inada (Japanese); Brent Mukai (English)
A Kinkaku-themed Digimon and Ginkaku-themed Digimon duo.
Sealsdramon (シールズドラモン, Shīruzudoramon)
Voiced by: Nobutoshi Canna (Japanese); Talon Warburton (English)
A cyborg dragon-themed Champion-level Digimon who is an infamous serial killer responsible for the deaths of many innocent Digimon, including Bokomon. He is ultimately killed by Gammamon as GulusGammamon to avenge Bokomon's death.
Monmon (コエモン, Koemon)
Voiced by: Mokoto Tsumura (Japanese); Anne Yatco (English)
An infant monkey-themed Digimon.
Feresmon (フェレスモン, Feresumon)
Voiced by: Ryo Horikawa (Japanese); Gabriel Warburton (English)
A Mephistopheles-themed Digimon.
Boogiemon (ブギーモン, Bugīmon)
Voiced by: Shunsuke Kanie, Daiki Takeuchi
A group of Bogeyman-themed Digimon who work for Feresmon.
Cherrymon (ジュレイモン, Jureimon)
Voiced by: Shin Aomori (Japanese); Ken Clement (English)
A cherry tree-themed Digimon.
Petermon (ピーターモン, Pītāmon)
Voiced by: Kenji Nojima (Japanese); Zeno Robinson (English)
A Peter Pan-themed Digimon who tried to take young children and Rookie-level Digimon away.
DarkLizardmon (ダークリザモン, Dākurizamon)
Voiced by: Ryota Takeuchi (Japanese); Sean Burgos (English)
A fiery lizard-themed Digimon who is a darker version of Flarerizamon.
Saberdramon (セーバードラモン, Sēbādoramon)
Voiced by: Masaya Takatsuka (Japanese); Joe Hernandez (English)
A Phoenix-themed Digimon and companion of DarkLizardmon who resembles a black version of Birdramon.
Frozomon (フロゾモン, Furozomon)
Voiced by: Rikiya Koyama (Japanese); Brent Mukai (English)
A snowplow-themed machine Ultimate-level Digimon armed with a fiery sword. He attacks the power plant the group is staying in while attempting to find a home for the Digimon he rescued. After being defeated by TelsaJellymon, Frozomon and his allies were forced to leave to find a new home.
Arukenimon (アルケニモン, Arukenimon)
Voiced by: Wakana Yamazaki (Japanese); Erin Lundquist (English)
A jorōgumo-themed Ultimate-level Digimon, who is known for her intelligent and temperamental personality. She feeds on human brains before being destroyed by Gammamon as GulusGammamon.
Dokugumon (ドクグモン, Dokugumon)
A swarm of giant wolf spider-themed Digimon who work for Arukenimon.
Ajatarmon (アヤタラモン, Ayataramon)
Voiced by: Takako Honda (Japanese); Heather Gonzales (English)
A humanoid plant-themed Ultimate-level Digimon who attempts to turn humans into more of her kind, before killing herself after a battle between Hiro and friends upon realizing she will never be able to be with Yuto.
SkullGreymon (スカルグレイモン, Sukarugureimon)
A skeletal dinosaur-themed Digimon.
Myotismon (ヴァンデモン, Vandemon)
Voiced by: Toshiyuki Morikawa (Japanese); Brian Anderson (English)
An evil vampire-themed Ultimate-level Digimon who aspires to take over the human world, acquiring followers by founding the trendsetter company Scarlatto Vento under the guise of Kyogoku Aviel. Dracmon used to work for Myotismon until he was killed by Myotismon for harming Ruli. Myotismon is defeated by Gammamon as Canoweissmon and turns back into a bat.
Matadormon (マタドゥルモン, Matadurumon)
A matador/Flamenco dancer-themed Digimon who works for Myotismon.
Sangloupmon (サングルゥモン, Sangurūmon)
An eyeless wolf-themed Digimon who works for Myotismon.
Splashmon (スプラッシュモン, Supurasshumon)
Voiced by: Hiroaki Miura (Japanese); Clifford Chapin (English)
A humanoid white tiger-themed Ultimate-level Digimon who can turn humans into water. He is defeated by SymbareAngoramon and taken back to the Digital World by BlackGatomon Uver.
Digitamamon (デジタマモン, Dejitamamon)
Voiced by: Rie Kugimiya (Japanese); Anne Yatco (English)
An Ultimate-level Digimon who dwells in an egg. He used to be good friends with Angoramon when they were in the Digital World, but upon coming to the human world began to eat humans. He was knocked out by Canoweissmon and reluctantly killed by SymbareAngoramon.
Asuramon (アシュラモン, Ashuramon)
Wrath Face Voiced by: Tessyo Genda (Japanese); Sean Burgos (English)
Blessings Face Voiced by: Toshihiko Seki (Japanese); Sean Burgos (English)
Mercy Face Voiced by: Takumi Yamazaki (Japanese); Sean Burgos (English)
An Asura-themed Digimon.
Mushroomon
Voiced by: Naoki Tatsuta
A mushroom-themed Digimon who works for Asuramon.
Kongoumon (コンゴウモン, Kongōmon)
A gold beetle-themed Digimon.
ExTyrannomon (エクスティラノモン, Ekusutiranomon)
Voiced by: Tetsu Shiratori (Japanese); Javier Prusky (English)
A plush Tyrannosaurus-themed Digimon who emerged from Kayou Aramaki's closet and implored her to have anyone who does not like her turned into dolls. ExTyrannomon was the one who turned people into dolls. Both of them were apprehended by Monzaemon upon their defeat.
WaruMonzaemon (ワルもんざえモン, WaruMonzaemon)
Voiced by: Takashi Matsuyama (Japanese); Gabriel Warburton (English)
A wicked teddy bear-themed Digimon with claws on its left hand. As a companion of ExTyrannomon, he emerged from Kayano Aramaki's closet and implored her to have anyone who does not like her turned into dolls. While ExTyrannomon did most of the work turning people into dolls, WaruMonzaemon intimidated anyone who threatened Kayano. Both of them were apprehended by Monzaemon upon their defeat.
Musyamon (ムシャモン, Mushamon)
Voiced by: Masashi Ebara (Japanese); Blythe Merlin (English)
A Champion-level samurai-themed Digimon who was Zubamon's rival. After traveling to the human world, it was sealed inside its cursed sword, and possessed those in control of the sword to be released from it. It is ultimately defeated after a sword duel against SymbareAngoramon and taken back to the Digital World by BlackGatomon Uver.
Betsumon (ベツモン, Betsumon)
Voiced by: Daisuke Kishio, Wasabi Mitsuta, Ryuhei Kitsunai, Mitsuki Nakamura, Ryusuke Asano, Reimi, Chihaya Terasaki (Japanese); Jacob Browning, Kdin Jenzen (English)
A group of cosplay-themed Ultimate-level Digimon who put on costume to steal other identities, with their base forms modeled after Gatomon. One stole Gammamon's identity, making Hiro think the imposter Betsumon was the real Gammamon. The group began to take the place of the other students in the dorms. Gammamon was able to snap Hiro out of it and defeated the group as Canonweissmon. Clockmon takes them away to clean up their act, where one now works in a doctor's clinic.
Sepikmon (セピックモン, Sepikkumon)
Voiced by: Ayako Saito (Japanese); Maihan (English)
A monkey/Aborigine-themed Digimon.
Salamandermon (サラマンダモン, Saramandamon)
Voiced by: Misa Watanabe (Japanese); Heather Gonzales (English)
A salamander-themed Digimon who turned children into human geckos.
Gigasmon (ギガスモン, Gigasumon)
Voiced by: Ken Uo (Japanese); Clifford Chapin (English)
A troll/giant-themed Digimon.
RareRaremon (レアレアモン, Reareamon)
An Ultimate-level Digimon who resembles a zombified pile of green decayed flesh. It resides in an illegal waste dump and infects humans and animals with its sludge, turning them into zombies. It was destroyed by the combined attacks of Canoweissmon, Thetismon, and Lamortmon.
Doumon (ドウモン, Dōmon)
Voiced by: Hikaru Midorikawa (Japanese); Grant George (English)
An anthropomorphic fox-themed Ultimate-level Digimon resembling Taomon who was possessed by vengeful spirits who make him do evil deeds, but was freed from their control after being defeated by Canoweissmon.
Calmaramon (カルマーラモン, Karumāramon)
Voiced by: Kaori Nazuka (Japanese); Ariana Nicole George (English)
A sea witch-themed Digimon with an upside-down giant squid below the waist who can create spirals out of objects. She fights Canoweissmon, and upon her defeat, undoes the spirals. It is implied that entering the human world through the gate caused her behavior to change.
Piedmon (ピエモン, Piemon)
Voiced by: Kazuhiro Yamagi (Japanese); Craig Lee Thomas (English)
A Mega-level pierrot Digimon who runs a twisted circus and can transform humans into cards if they do their stunts incorrectly. He challenges Ruli to a card duel, and upon being defeated turns the cards back to humans.
Mephistomon (メフィスモン, Mefisumon)
Voiced by: Jiro Saito (Japanese); Gabriel Warburton (English)
A Mephistopheles-themed Digimon who works for Piedmon while posing as a circus announcer.
Opossumon (オポッサモン, Opossamon)
Voiced by: Ryoko Shiraishi (Japanese); Kristen McGuire (English)
An opossum-themed Digimon who works for Piedmon while posing as a circus mascot.
FlameWizardmon (フレイウィザーモン, Fureiwizāmon)
Voiced by: Takayuki Kondo (Japanese); Darrel Delfin (English)
A fiery wizard-themed Digimon who works for Piedmon while posing as a lion tamer.
TobuCatmon (トブキャットモン, Tobukyattomon)
Voiced by: Cocoro Kikuchi (Japanese); Ariana Nicole George (English)
A cat/Grumman F-14 Tomcat-themed Digimon who works for Piedmon while posing as a lion.
Lynxmon (ランクスモン, Rankusumon)
Voiced by: Taro Yamaguchi (Japanese); Brenk Mukai (English)
A fiery lynx-themed Digimon who works for Piedmon while posing as a lion.
Oboromon (オボロモン, Oboromon)
Voiced by: Volcano Ota (Japanese); Sean Burgos, Grant George, Brent Mukai, Gabriel Warburton (English)
Several Oboroguruma-themed Ultimate Digimon who hunt down humans in order to guess the colors for each. The red Oboromon kidnaps Hiro and imprisons him in his scarf. Enraged, Gammamon was forced to Digivolve to GulusGammamon, and kills the red Oboromon in order to free Hiro, as well as stripping the colors of the four remaining Oboromon, defeating them.
Eyesmon (アイズモン, Aizumon)
Voiced by: Ryusei Nakao (Japanese); Darrel Delfin (English)
A Champion-level Digimon who resembles a shadowy dragon with eyes all over its body. It possessed an American girl named Emma Haynes, but was defeated by Canoweissmon.
Antylamon Evil (アンティラモン, Antiramon)
Voiced by: Kenichi Suzumura (Japanese); Adam McArthur (English)
A tall rabbit-themed Digimon.
Publimon (パブリモン, Paburimon)
Voiced by: Kappei Yamaguchi (Japanese); Bryce Papenbrook (English)
A seashell-helmeted publicist-themed Champion-level Digimon who publishes dangerous stunts in an attempt to kill people. He fights KausGammamon in an aerial battle, but falls to his death after his parachute is destroyed.
Oleamon (オウリアモン, Ōriamon)
Voiced by: Haruna Ikezawa (Japanese); Emi Lo (English)
An olea-themed Digimon.
Datamon (ナノモン, Nanomon)
Voiced by: Bin Shimada (Japanese); Adam McArthur (English)
A small robot-themed Digimon.
Chamblemon (シャンブルモン, Chanburumon)
Voiced by: Setsuji Sato, Mitsuaki Madono, Yusuke Handa, Hirokazu Miyahara (Japanese); Jacob Browning, Sean Burgos, Clifford Chapin, Bryce Papenbrook (English)
A group of champignon-themed Champion-level Digimon who plant spores on humans so they can eat the mushrooms on their bodies. They fought against Thetismon, and after their defeat, they are taken away by the Geremon.
Bucchiemon (プッチーモン, Putchīmon)
Voiced by: Kaede Hondo (Japanese); Kristen McGuire (English)
A pixie-themed Digimon who befriends a human boy named Riku Fukastu, only to become obsessed with getting payback for anything she did for him. She later Digivolves to the Maine Coon-themed Ultimate-level Meicrackmon: Vicious Mode (メイクラックモン：ヴィシャスモード, Meicrackmon: Vicious Mode) to modify his body to be more like her, only for him to flee in terror. She later fights Gammamon and Jellymon, and upon her defeat, breaks off her and Riku's friendship before running away.
AxeKnightmon
Voiced by: Kenta Miyake (Japanese); Joe Hernandez (English)
An Ultimate-level black knight-themed Digimon who lost its head and is now searching the human world for it. Once it regains its head, it attacks the Ghost Game team, but is defeated by Canoweissmon.
Shawjamon (シャウジンモン, Shaujinmon)
Voiced by: Hiroaki Hirata (Japanese); Joe Hernandez (English)
An Ultimate-level Sha Wujing-themed Digimon who lived in a lake with three Gwappamon, and becomes savage and aggressive after several beads on its necklace were cracked. After being defeated by Lamortmon, it was subdued and healed by Thetismon, restoring its beads to normal.
Bastemon (バステモン, Basutemon)
Voiced by: Hitomi Nabatame (Japanese); Emi Lo (English)
A Bastet/Nekomata-themed Digimon.
Kuzuhamon (クズハモン, Kuzuhamon)
Voiced by: Mayumi Asano (Japanese); Anne Yatco (English)
A fox-armored humanoid Digimon who resembles a recolored version of Sakuyamon.
Lilithmon (リリスモン, Ririsumon)
Voiced by: Mie Sonozaki (Japanese); Elizabeth Maxwell (English)
A Lilith-themed Mega-level Digimon who infected several humans and Digimon. Gammamon is able to hold her off as Siriusmon, and the fight between the two ends in a draw. Lilithmon decides to call off her attack and offers Siriusmon a place at her side. When Siriusmon refuses, she retreats while wondering if he will ever accept her offer.
Cerberumon (ケルベロモン, Keruberomon)
Voiced by: Tomoyuki Shimura (Japanese); Sean Burgos (English)
A Cerberus-themed Digimon who worked for Lilithmon. It is able to become Cerberumon Werewolf Mode (ケルベロモン：人狼モード, Keruberomon: jinrō mōdo) to fight Thetismon and Lamortmon, but was defeated in the end, retreating with Lilithmon.
AncientSphinxmon (エンシェントスフィンクモン, EnshentoSufinkumon)
Voiced by: Hiroyuki Kinoshita (Japanese); Brent Mukai (English)
A Mega-level sphinx-themed Digimon who turns humans into slab stones if they fail to answer his riddles. Angoramon fights him as Lamortmon, but is overpowered until he becomes Darabbitmon for the first time and defeats AncientSphinxmon, who is then killed by its own vortex.
Pharaohmon (ファラオモン, Faraomon)
Voiced by: Brent Mukai
A Pharaoh-themed Digimon who AncientSphinxmon tried to revive.
ShogunGekomon (トノサマゲコモン, TonosamaGekomon)
Voiced by: Show Hayami (Japanese); Sean Burgos (English)
A gigantic red frog-themed monster who sucks in humans inside him through the horns on his back. He kidnaps Kiyoshiro and has an Gekomon assistant. He fights Gammamon and Angoramon, and later Gammamon becomes GulusGammamon, violently assaulting him and forcing his Gekomon assistant to release the human victims from his master's back, freeing Kiyoshiro. His life was spared, thanks to Hiro stopping GulusGammamon from killing him.
Gekomon (ゲコモン, Gekomon)
Voiced by: Adam McArthur
A green frog-themed Digimon who works for ShogunGekomon.
Cthyllamon (クティーラモン, Kutīramon)
Voiced by: Shizuka Ishigami (Japanese); Adam McArthur (English)
A Mega-Level blue clione-themed Digimon who dwells in the ocean and resembles demonic version of MarineAngemon. He challenges Jellymon to a fight, and Jellymon becomes Amphimon for the first time and defeats Cthyllamon, then accepts his defeat after some encouragement from Amphimon.
Divermon (ハンギョモン, Hangyomon)
Voiced by: Yoshiyuki Kano (Japanese); Jacob Browning (English)
A piscine humanoid-themed Digimon in diving attire who works for Cthyllamon.
Moon=Millenniumon (ムーンミレニアモン, MūnMireniamon)
Voiced by: Atsuki Tani (Japanese); Talon Warburton (English)
An evil crystal-themed Mega-level Digimon where its insides contain a two-headed spirit with the heads of Kimeramon and Machinedramon. He killed a researcher named Jinno Minami, then took over her corpse and became ZeedMillenniummon (ズィードミレニアモン, ZīdoMireniamon). It is defeated by Siriusmon and Darabbitmon and then reverts back to Moon=Millenniummon.
Vilemon (イビルモン, Ebirumon)
An imp-themed Digimon who works for Moon=Millenniumon.
Tsumemon (ツメモン, Tsumemon)
A claw-shaped Fresh Digimon who works for Moon=Millenniumon.
ClavisAngemon (クラヴィスエンジェモン, Kuravisuenjemon)
Voiced by: Tomokazu Sugita (Japanese); Sean Burgos (English)
A key-wielding angel-themed Digimon.
Quartzmon (クオーツモン, Kuōtsumon)
Voiced by: Juurouta Kosugi (Japanese); Brent Mukai (English)
A Mega-level Digimon with four arms who wears a yellow mask and has a single purple eye. It was responsible for spreading its clones across Japan disguised as food, causing people to eat ravenously and the food they eat to be transferred to its copies. It battles Siriusmon and Amphimon, and after being defeated, it is revealed it was trying to feed several Fresh and In-Training Digimon it was sheltering.
Dragomon (ダゴモン, Dagomon)
Voiced by: Takashi Matsuyama (Japanese); Brent Mukai (English)
A Cthulhu-themed Ultimate-level Digimon who calls humans to become his minions, turning them into Gill-men. After he is defeated by Siriusmon, he is swallowed by a digital gate.
Rafflesimon (ラフレシモン, Rafureshimon)
Voiced by: Akeno Watanabe (Japanese); Elizabeth Maxwell (English)
A mega level Rafflesia/fairy-themed Digimon who tries to consume Hiro and his friends when they arrive at the Digital World.
BloomLordmon (ブルムロードモン, Burumurōdomon)
Voiced by: Shūichi Ikeda (Japanese); Sean Burgos (English)
A Mega-level flower/knight-themed Digimon who guards the entrance to Quantumon's domain. Initially attacking intruders like Hiro and his friends, it later fights against the appearing Regulusmon.

==== Other Digimon ====
BlackGatomon Uver (ブラックテイルモン Uver., Burakkuteirumon Uver.)
A black cat/courier-themd Digimon who makes errands throughout the series. It is the first Digimon Hiro ever met as it delivered the Digivices from Hokuto.
Sistermon Ciel (シスタモン シエル, Shisutamon Shieru)
Voiced by: Yukana (Japanese); Anjali Kunapaneni (English)
A sky blue nun-themed Digimon.
Hawkmon (ホークモン, Hōkumon)
Voiced by: Arisa Sekine, Rika Nagae (Japanese); Lizzie Freeman, Anne Yatco (English)
Two bald eagle-themed Digimon who befriended Kazuma Kitagawa.
Piximon (ピッコロモン, Pikkuromon)
Voiced by: Konami Yoshida (Japanese); Lizzie Freeman (English)
A pixie-themed Digimon.
Pillomon (ピロモン, Piromon)
Voiced by: Ayaka Saito (Japanese); Dorah Fine (English)
A pillow/sheep-themed Digimon.
Shadramon (シェイドラモン, Sheidoramon)
Voiced by: Nobuyuki Hayama (Japanese); Clifford Chaplin (English)
A fiery butterfly-themed Digimon.
Geremon (ゲレモン, Geremon)
Voiced by: Megumi Urama (Japanese); Laura Chatterjee (English)
A group of yellow slug-themed Digimon who operated near where the Chamblemon were kidnapping people.

=== Other characters ===
Akane
Ruli's teacher, who has brown eyes and brown hair and wears a yellow t-shirt with a star on it.
Aoi Uwada (宇和田 アオイ, Uwada Aoi)
Voiced by: Arisa Sekine
Ruli's friend and classmate, who has yellow eyes and brown hair.
Mika Kashiwagi (柏木 ミカ, Kashiwagi Mika)
Voiced by: Kanami Taguchi
Ruli's friend and classmate, who has blue eyes and black hair worn in a ponytail.
Nana
Ruli's friend and classmate, who has brown eyes and dark brown hair worn in twintails.
Moe
Ruli's friend and classmate, who has blue eyes and black hair.
Yuina
A little girl who Kiyoshiro saves.
Kayono Aramaki (荒巻 カヨノ, Aramaki Kayono)
Voiced by: Satomi Satō
A little girl who was once Aoi's friend.
Hokuto Amanokawa (天ノ河 北斗, Amanokawa Hokuto)
Voiced by: Hiroki Takahashi
Hiro's father who has been in the Digital World since he mysteriously disappeared.

== Production ==
=== Background ===
Digimon Ghost Game teaser visual

Digimon Ghost Game was officially announced at Bandai's DigiFes 2021 event on August 1, 2021 with a first teaser visual for the series, by Tenya Yabuno. The series is directed by Kimitoshi Chioka and Masato Mitsuka, with Masashi Sogo supervising the series' scripts, Tenya Yabuno as character designer and Mariko Itō adapting their designs for animation, and Kenji Watanabe designing the Digimon and Cho Shinozuka adapting their designs for animation.

In the October issue of Shueisha's V Jump magazine on August 19, 2021, the presentation stated that Ghost Game is going to be the franchise's first horror-themed entry. The creation of this series required putting thought into how to reinterpret the Digimon and the background lore that Bandai has created, in the context of the horror genre. New Digimon have been created specifically for this series, but old Digimon also appear and play an active role in this story through their background and aspects. In this series, Digimon are compared to poltergeists from Japanese folklore; the first promotional poster introduced them as "Hologram...?" and "Ghost...? ". The series is produced for an episodic format.

Toei Animation decided to make Digimon Ghost Game a villain of the week show as they found that children of the generation the series came out have low attention spans due to the prevalence of YouTube and TikTok. They were worried that if they made a show with an extended plot, children would get bored quickly and stop watching the show entirely.

=== Development ===
The announcement was originally leaked on Chinese social media on July 28, 2021. On August 7, 2021, the teaser visual was updated on the official website with the only difference being, Kiyoshirō's left hand covered with bandages. On September 3, 2021, Shueisha's Saikyo Jump magazine announced Digimon Dreamers, unrelated to the anime, with a first illustration from the monthly illustrated by Yabuno featuring Hiro, the main character of Ghost Game, with goggles. The design of the protagonist wasn't finalized at the time of submission, and then changed to an original character in a new illustration revealed by the author via Twitter on September 4, 2021. On September 10, 2021, the official website revealed the cast, the airing date, as well as the main visual featuring the characters in their school uniforms, design by Mariko Itō.

== Broadcast and distribution ==
The first trailer for the series was shown during the 65th episode of Digimon Adventure:. The series premiered on Fuji TV on October 3, 2021, set to start after Adventure: in the same timeslot. Digimon Ghost Game is broadcast on Fuji Television, and available for streaming on TVer, U-NEXT, Bandai Channel, Anime Hodai and Docomo Anime Store in Japan. The series ended with its 68th episode on March 26, 2023.

Digimon Ghost Game is distributed and streamed simultaneously by Crunchyroll in North America, Central America, South America, Europe, Africa, Oceania, the MENA and CIS zones with English, Spanish, French, Portuguese, Arabic, Italian, German and Russian (1–21) subtitles for premium members within the first week of release. Starting in spring 2022, new episodes are available by subscription only, with the first twenty-one episodes remaining available to all users. The anime was also simulcast on VRV in the United States. In France, the anime is also available on Anime Digital Network and J-One.

On March 6, 2022, Toei Animation announced that the series would not air the following Sunday due to the Nagoya Women's Marathon. On March 7, 2022, Toei Animation and Digimon Ghost Game's social network revealed that they had been affected by a computer hacking attack, with all media produced by the studio facing postponements starting on March 20, 2022. In Japan, Fuji TV decided to rebroadcast the first episode of Digimon Ghost Game on March 20 and a selection of episodes in the following weeks during the hiatus.

An English dub of the series premiered on BBC iPlayer in the United Kingdom on December 1, 2025.

=== Soundtrack ===
The composer of the Japanese version is Kow Otani. Wienners performs the opening theme "FACTION", and Aiiro Apollo performs the series' first ending theme "Pedal" (episodes 1–12). BMK performs the second ending theme, "Because I've Been Lovesick" (episodes 13–21). Bye-Bye-Hand performs the third ending theme, "Hikariau Monotachi" (episodes 22–31). The fourth ending theme, "Monster Disco" (episodes 32–44), was written and sung by Shikao Suga and arranged by Hyadain. Kobore performs the fifth ending theme, "Strawberry" (episodes 45–57). Penthouse performs the sixth and final ending theme, "Take Me Maybe" (episodes 58–67).
