= Digimon Beatbreak =

Japanese anime television series

- Key visual for the series
- デジモンビートブレイク
- Genre: Adventure, cyberpunk
- Created by: Akiyoshi Hongo
- Developed by: Ryōta Yamaguchi
- Directed by: Hiroaki Miyamoto
- Voices of: Miyu Irino; Megumi Han; Tomoyo Kurosawa; Mutsumi Tamura; Arisa Sekine; Misaki Kuno; Yōhei Azakami; Daiki Hamano
- Music by: Alisa Okehazama
- Country of origin: Japan
- Original language: Japanese
- No. of episodes: 49

Production
- Production companies: Fuji Television; Yomiko Advertising; Toei Animation

Original release
- Network: Fuji Television
- Release: October 5, 2025 – September 27, 2026

Related
- Digimon franchise
- Digimon Adventure; Digimon Adventure 02; Digimon Adventure tri.; Digimon Tamers; Digimon Frontier; Digimon Data Squad (Savers); Digimon Fusion (Xros Wars); Digimon Universe: App Monsters; Digimon Adventure (2020 TV series); Digimon Ghost Game

Digimon Beatbreak (Japanese: デジモンビートブレイク, Hepburn: Dejimon Bītobureiku; stylized in all caps) is a Japanese anime television series produced by Toei Animation, part of the Digimon franchise. It is directed by Hiroaki Miyamoto, with series composition by Ryota Yamaguchi, with Takahiro Kojima as character designer and Alisa Okehazama composing the music. The series premiered on October 5, 2025, on Fuji TV and other networks, as part of the Anime Sunday 9 programming block. The opening theme song is "Mad Pulse", performed by MADKID. The first ending theme song is "Beat Up", performed by Tomioka Ai, the second ending theme song "Brave Groove" is performed by iLiFE!, the third ending theme "Mira Mira" is performed by Korean idol singer Choi Ye-na, and the fourth ending theme "Break It" is performed by Korean girl group Kiss of Life.

The series ended on September 27, 2026, and was succeeded by Digimon: World's Best Picks (デジモン僕らが選んだベストアドベンチャー, Dejimon Bokura ga Eranda Best Adventure), a rebroadcast program for past entries in its timeslot while a new Digimon anime series is scheduled to be released in 2027.

The series is simulcast on Crunchyroll worldwide (excluding Italy) and on Hulu in the United States.

The first episode aired as an early preview during the Digimon Expo event on September 20.

An English dub for the series premiered on Crunchyroll with its first five episodes on December 27, 2025. Episodes 6–10 was released on January 31, 2026. The English dub ended on November 21, 2026. The first ten episodes of the English dub became available on Hulu on March 24, 2026.

== Production ==
Producer Nobuharu Takada stated Digimon Beatbreak is aimed at an older audience than previous shows, saying it is aimed at older teens and adults in their twenties. He stated kids like to watch shows aimed at adults, so figured kids would watch it as well. He also stated Beatbreak was made as there was a gap that needed to be filled in the 9am Fuji TV time slot. As the producer of that time slot, he suggested Digimon – which was accepted.

== Plot ==
In a futuristic time, human thoughts and emotions are used as an energy source called e-Pulse to power the AI support device Sapotama. The Sapotama was developed by the World Union who also act as an authoritative force across the world, responsible for various fields and resources, including the arcologies called Shangri-La Eggs. The World Union however hides the fact that the Sapotama can generate Digimon, digital lifeforms that evolve by consuming humans' e-Pulse. It is also shown that a "cold heart" can happen when a human's e-Pulse is drained and their bodies get frozen. The Ministry of Civil Protection serves to protect the World Union's interests by using bounty-hunting teams known as Cleaners to eliminate Digimon. They also force individuals that summoned their Digimon to become Cleaners or be a target themselves.

In 2050, Tomoro Tenma has an extraordinary e-Pulse that causes Hitomi Shinomiya's Sapotama to malfunction. This draws the attention of a group of Hyemon, who "cold heart" Hitomi while finding the e-Pulse's source. Tired and confused from his older brother Asuka for not explaining the situation, Tomoro throws his Sapotama in frustration, causing it to malfunction and summoning Gekkomon. Tomoro chases after Gekkomon, allowing the Hyemons to spot Tomoro and hunt him down. Asuka protects Tomoro from the Hyemons but gets "cold hearted" from one of them. Gekkomon asks Tomoro for his e-Pulse to fight off the Hyemons, and obliges. While fighting however, Gokuwmon kills the Hyemon that took Asuka's e-Pulse and takes its Sapotama before running off.

Tomoro is taken in by the Cleaner team Glowing Dawn, led by Kyo Sawashiro. Alongside Reina Sakuya and Makoto Kuonji, the four of them engage in bounty-hunting to make credit, the currency used in this world. However because their team does not delete Digimon and instead rehouse them in a secret shelter in Nirinso, they earn less credit than other Cleaner teams. While living together under Glowing Dawn, Tomoro gradually renews his resolve and begins to bond with Gekkomon and the other Glowing Dawn members. Unbeknownst to Tomoro and Glowing Dawn, they are secretly being manipulated by Genjo Kanada and his Digimon Gokuwmon, part of the highest ranked Cleaner team Five Stars, who serve World Union chairman Wong. After being reminded of the Kano Island Incident where Wong and other researchers' experimentation on e-Pulse caused a world-ending disaster that killed millions, Wong accelerates the Shangri-La Project to end the "cold heart" incidents.

Glowing Dawn find themselves caught up with Klay Arslan, the Five Star of Earth leading an illegal underground operation involving Digimon. Klay also leads an global militaristic Cleaner team named TACTICS, whose Team Seven often clash against Glowing Dawn. Genjo secretly pushes Glowing Dawn to undermine Klay's operation, leading to his defeat and forced out of the Five Stars, with his TACTICS organization disband. Following that, Glowing Dawn encounters a terrorist group called GIFT, led by Miharu Kagemori who is motivated to take down the World Union for the Digimon cause. In reality, Miharu had been taken under control by Mephistomon after her own sister's suicide due to her attempted whistle-blowing efforts about Digimon to the World Union. Tomoro defeats Mephistomon and frees Miharu, while Kanchi Kishiwada takes the White Core embedded in Mephistomon, and gives it to Souji Kuroshio, the former Five Star of Water. Souji hopes to re-enact a feeling he got from Kyo back when he was the Five Star of Gold and was on the verge of killing him after Souji murdered a family and their Digimon that had discovered Kyo and took him under their care. Kyo is able to overcome his fear of losing his new family and defeats Souji, while also demonstrating his humanity towards him.

Kanchi takes back the White Core and hands it to Wong, scoring a seat as the new Five Star of Earth. The White Core houses HeliosBoamon, whose Mega-form Albatusmon is able to absorb e-Pulse from those around her. Wong and Genjo begins the Shangri-La Project by taking Asuka from the World Union Hospital and placing him and HeliosBoamon under mind control. Genjo tricks Tomoro to emanate his negative e-Pulse, allowing HeliosBoamon to digivolve to Albatusmon. In Glowing Dawn's struggle to escape Albatusmon, Kyo tries to save Asuka, only to lose his right arm to Gokuwmon and have his partner Digimon Murasamemon killed by Albatusmon. Undeterred by the loss, the remaining Glowing Dawn members, including members from the former TACTICS Team Seven, team up to stop the Shangri-La Project. Wong loses support from the other Five Star members, excluding Genjo and Kanchi, as well the new Five Star of Wood Senka Nishino.

While attempting to stop Wong and save Asuka, Senka "cold hearts" Tomoro, triggering an emotional response from Gekkomon that causes him to digivolve to Atratusmon, the counterpart to Albatusmon who emanates energy. Genjo betrays and "cold hearts" Wong, revealing he, Kanchi, and Senka were the Digimon Sanzomon, Sagomon, and Cho-Hakkaimon respectively. Sanzomon merges Gokuwmon and the others to SeitenGokuwmon, and uses Albatusmon and Atratusmon in a loop to force every Sapotama to generate a Digimon and kill all the humans. Tomoro is revived thanks to leftover e-Pulse from his Sapotama, and he and the others stop Sanzomon's plans and frees Atratusmon, Asuka, and Albatusmon. Enraged, Sanzomon, using SeitenGokuwmon, engages battle with the now freed Albatusmon and Atratusmon. Realizing his needs as a Digimon and a partner to Tomoro, Atratusmon begins to create his own e-Pulse, which other Digimon follow suit, while others like Murasamemon return to life to their partners. This empowerment allows Albatusmon and Atratusmon to fuse into Volvemon and defeat SeitenGokuwmon. Sanzomon accepts defeat and takes off, promising to watch over everyone's efforts to make a world where humans and Digimon can co-exist. Sometime later, the Ministry of Civil Protection is renamed to the Ministry of Digimon, and Nirinso is recognized as an orphanage for Digimon to train and create their own e-Pulse. Due to the rise in criminal activity involving Digimon however, the Cleaner system remains, though Glowing Down are now considered heroes and earn more recognition.

== Episodes and story arcs ==
- Glowing Dawn arc (episodes 1–12)
- TACTICS arc (espisodes 13–24)
- Interlude arc (episodes 25–27)
- GIFT arc (episodes 28–37)
- Kyo arc (episodes 38–41)
- Asuka arc (episodes 42–49)

== Reception ==
The show received acclaim from critics and audiences, who described it as a returned to form for the franchise.

=== Accolades ===
Year	Award	Category	Recipient	Result	Ref.
2026	10th Crunchyroll Anime Awards	Best Original Anime	Digimon Beatbreak	Nominated	
2026	21st AnimaniA Awards	Best TV Series: Online	Digimon Beatbreak	Nominated	
2026	21st AnimaniA Awards	Best Anime Song	"Mad Pulse" by MADKID	Nominated	
