= Shibuya Stream =

Skyscraper in Tokyo, Japan

- 渋谷ストリーム
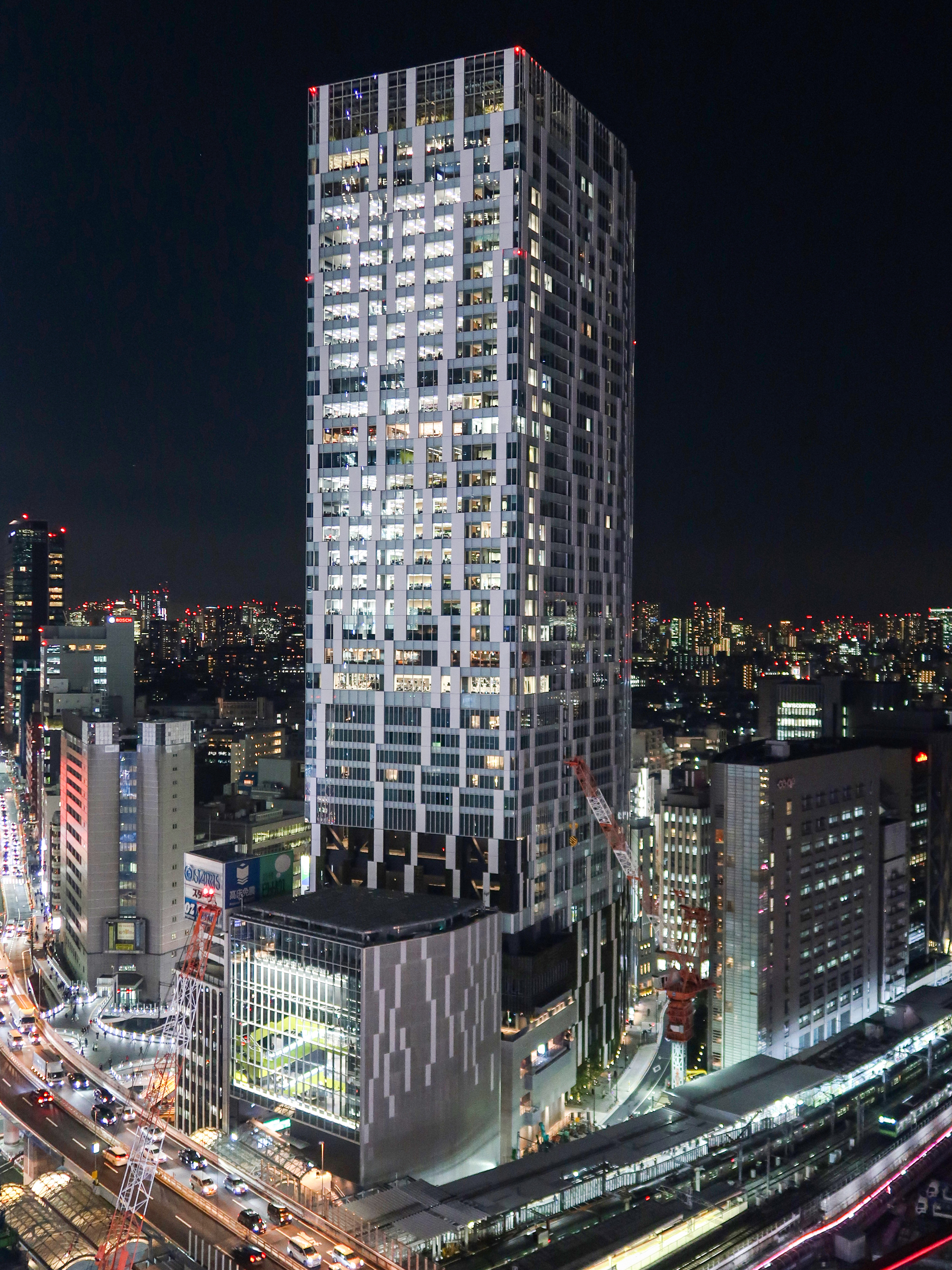
- View in 2019
- Interactive map of the Shibuya Stream area

General information
- Status: Completed
- Location: Shibuya, Tokyo, Japan
- Coordinates: 35°39′25.8″N 139°42′11.4″E
- Construction started: 2015
- Completed: 2018
- Opening: September 13, 2018

Height
- Roof: 180 m (590 ft)

Technical details
- Floor count: 35
- Floor area: 118,379.92 m^{2}
- Lifts/elevators: 33

Design and construction
- Architect: Kazuko Akamatsu
- Architecture firm: Coelacanth and Associates

Other information
- Public transit: Shibuya Station

Website
- shibuyastream.jp

Shibuya Stream (Japanese: 渋谷ストリーム) is a skyscraper and retail complex completed in 2018 in the Shibuya shopping district of Tokyo, Japan. The building is located in the space vacated when the Tōkyū Tōyoko Line terminal in Shibuya was relocated underground in 2013.

Shibuya Stream hosts Google's Japan head office as well as the Excel Tokyu Shibuya Stream hotel.

== Gallery ==
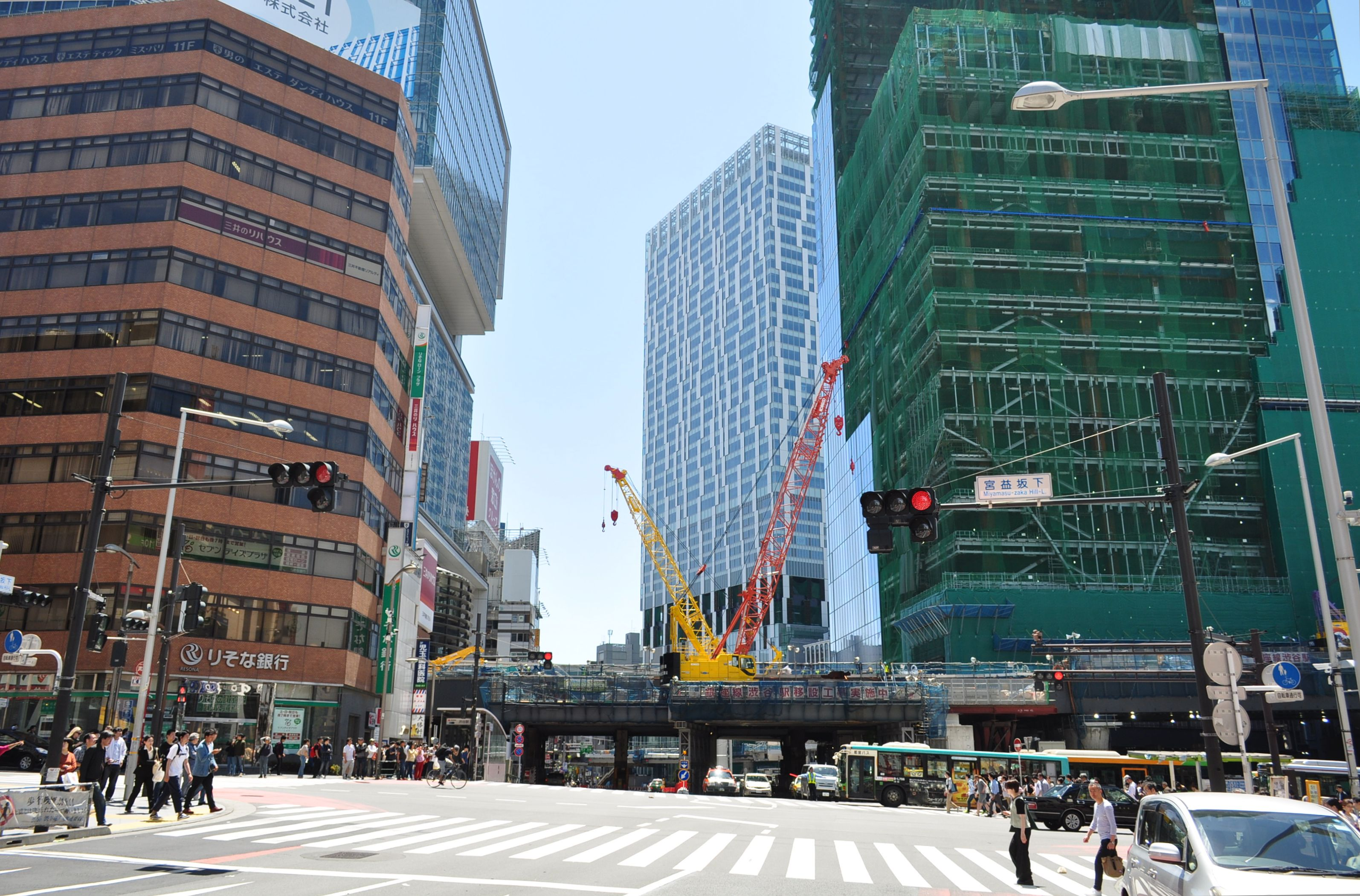
View from Dogenzaka in central Shibuya

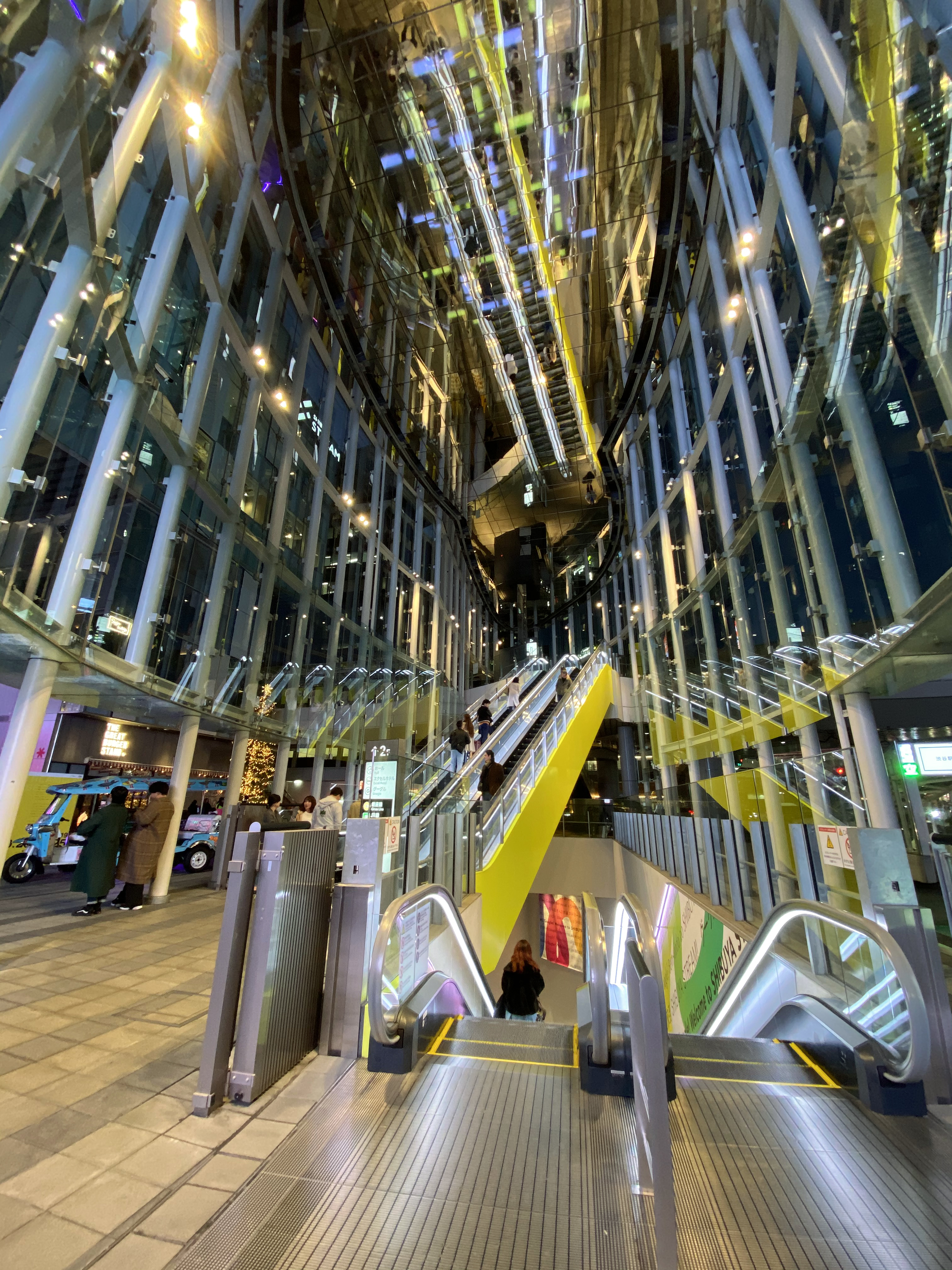
View from 1st floor towards entrance

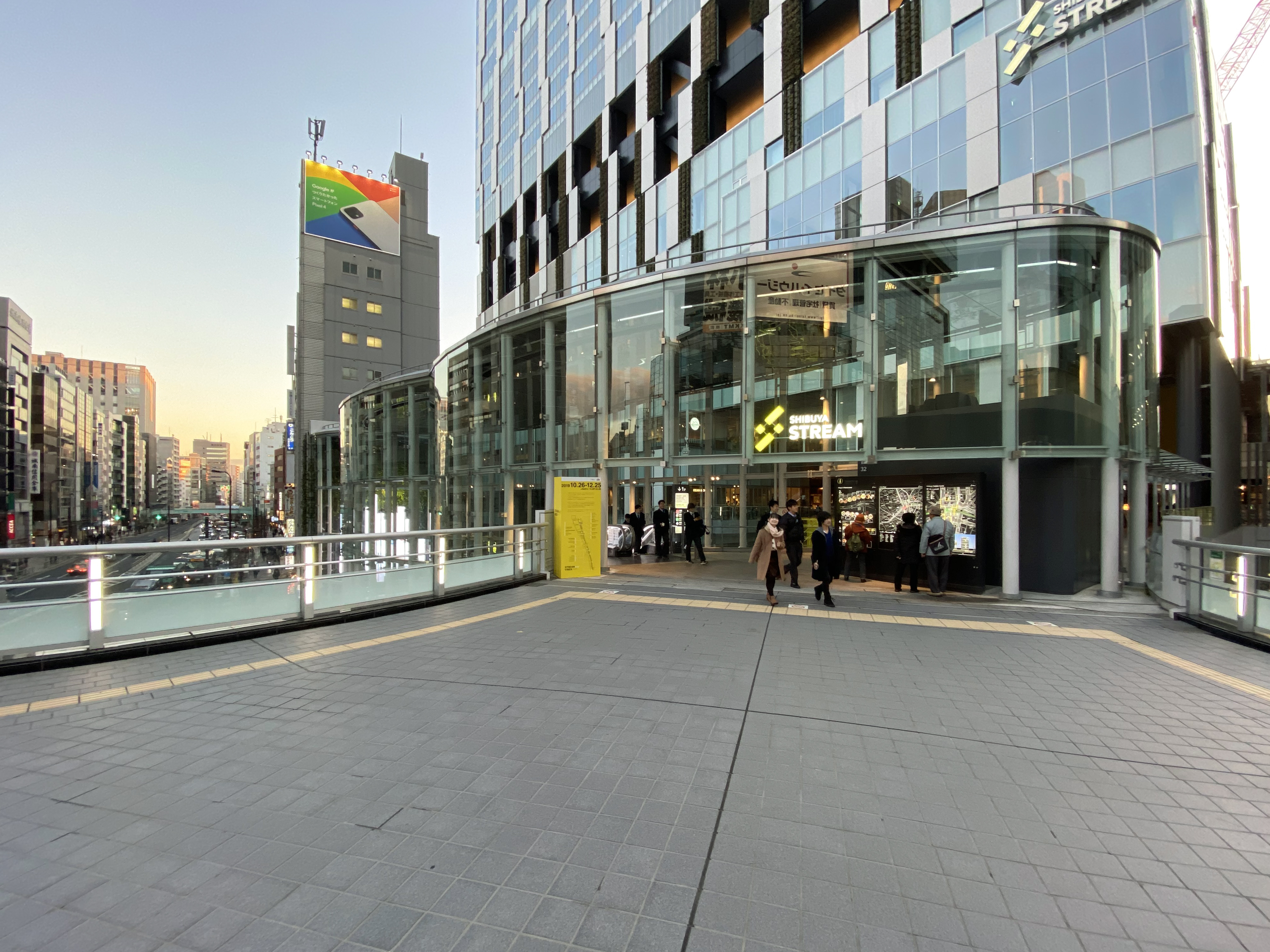
View from the 2nd floor pedestrian deck

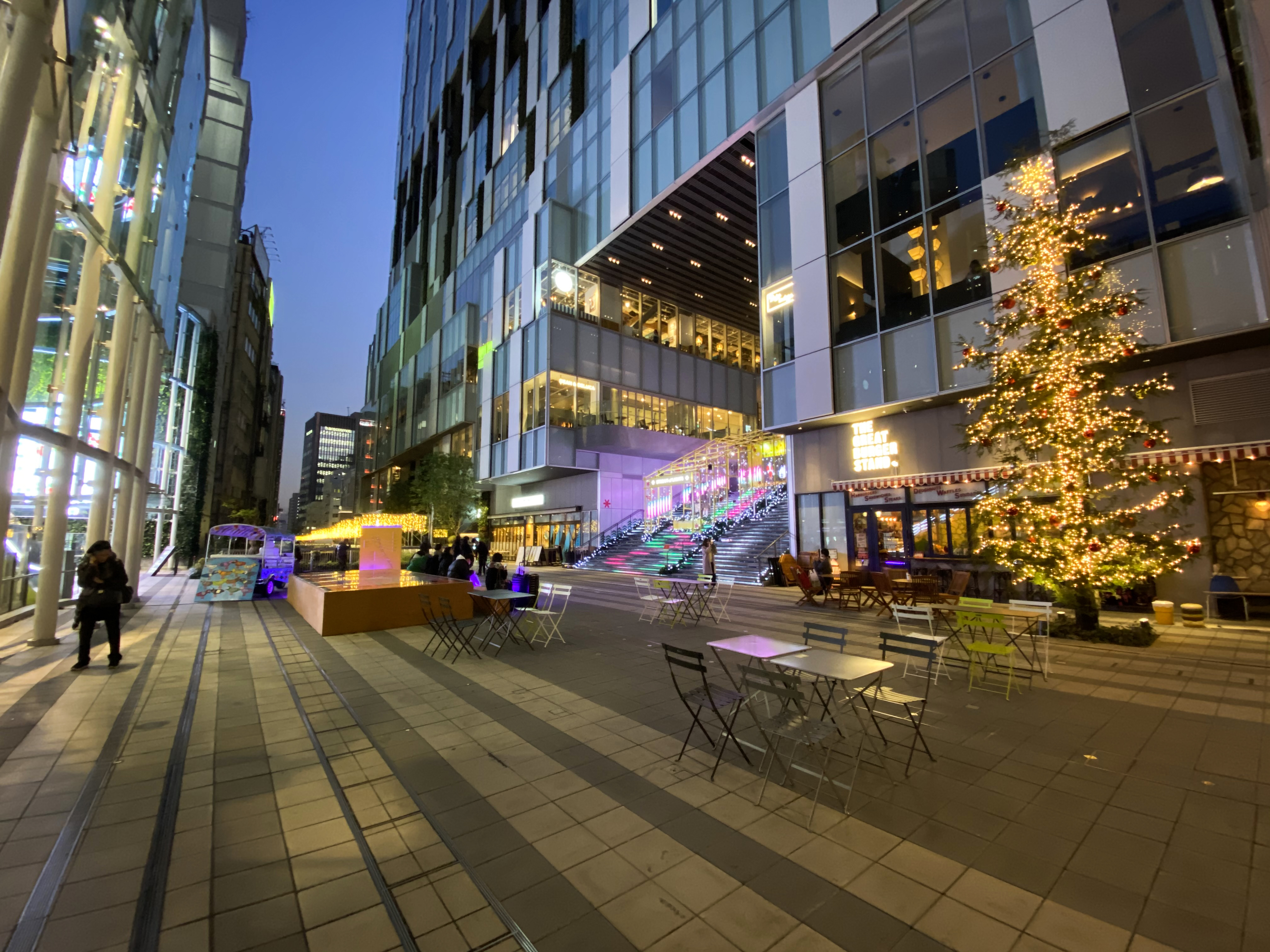
Inari Bridge Square

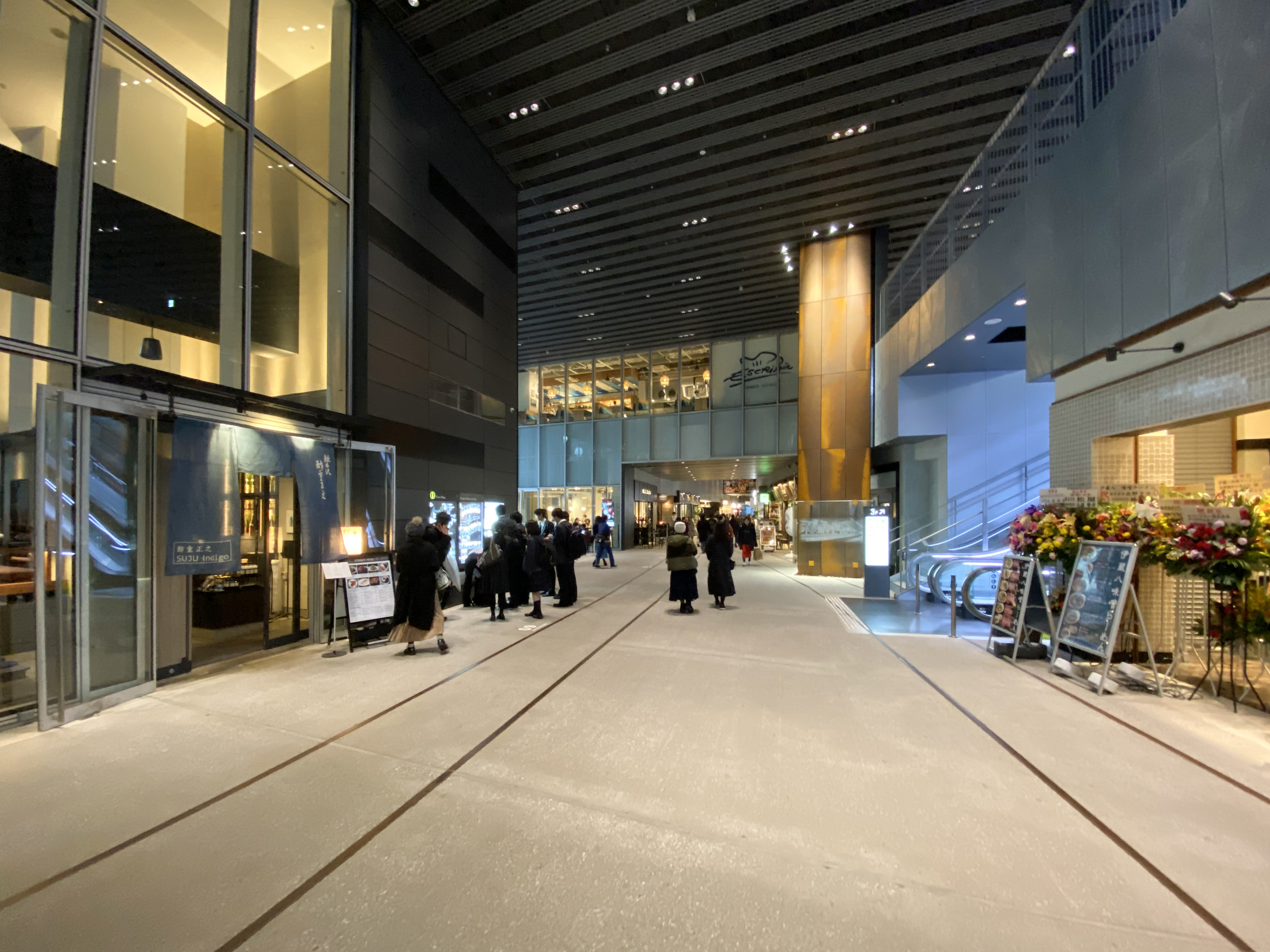
Level 2 Stream Line

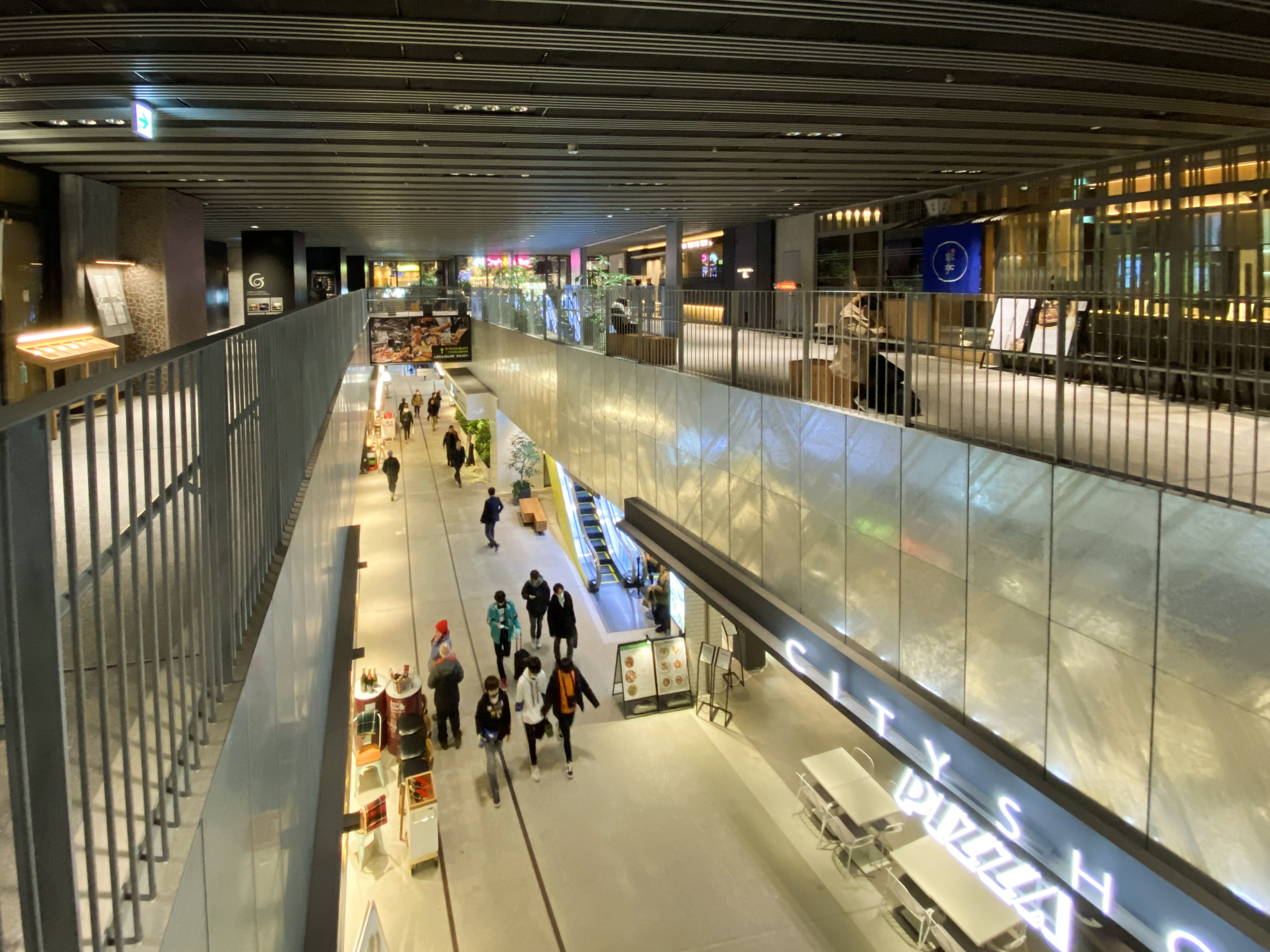
Level 3 Restaurants

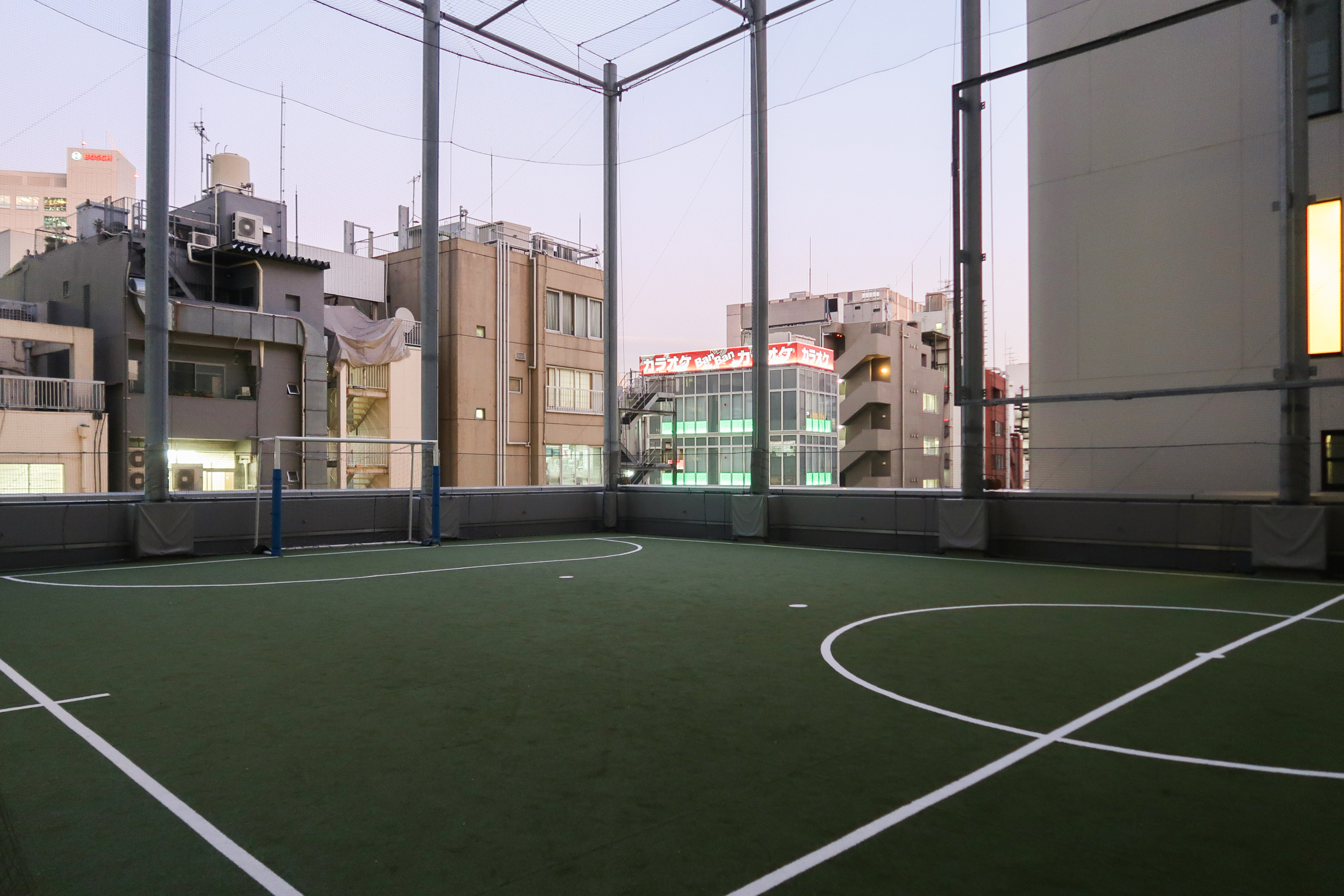
Level 4 Activity Court

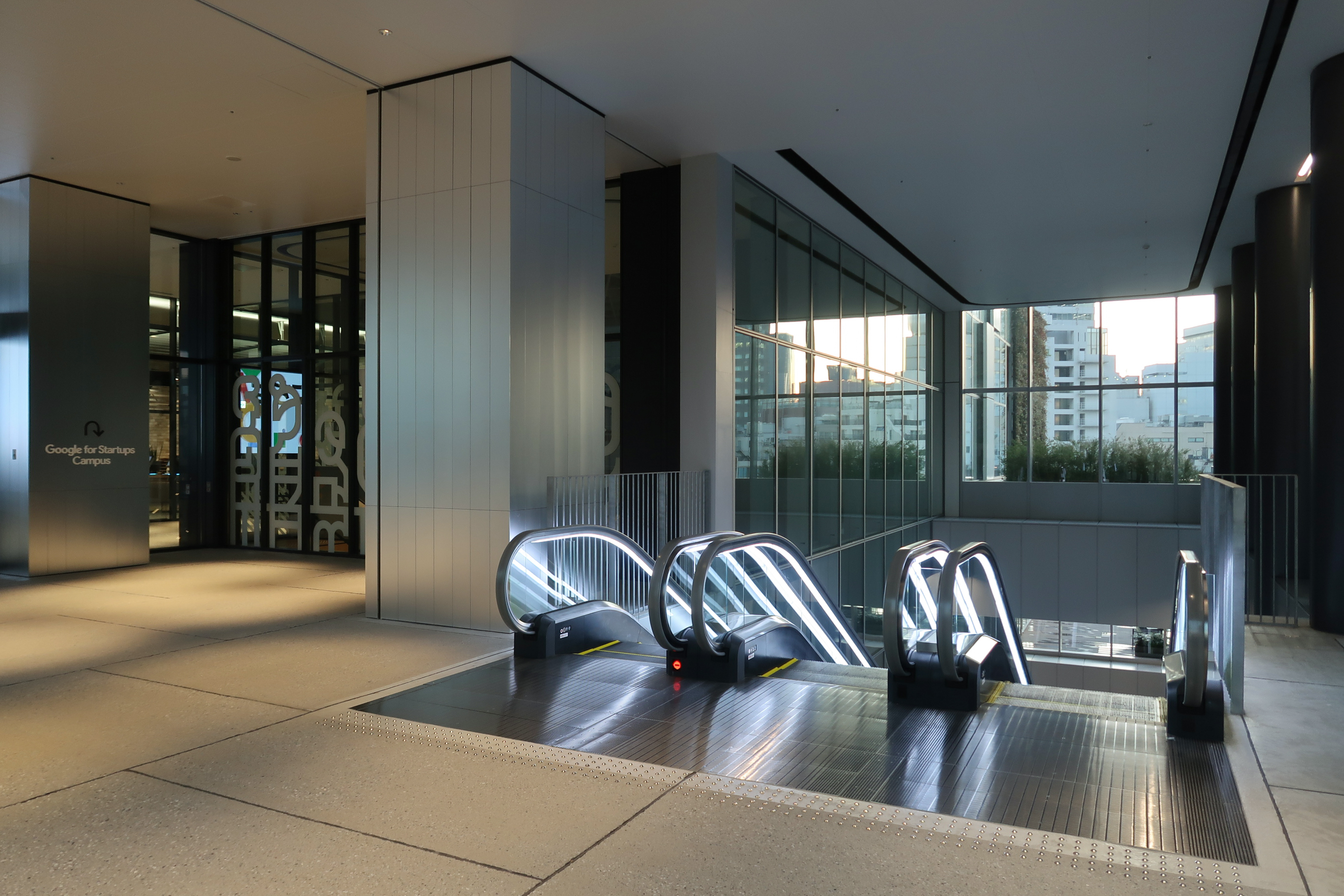
Office Entrance

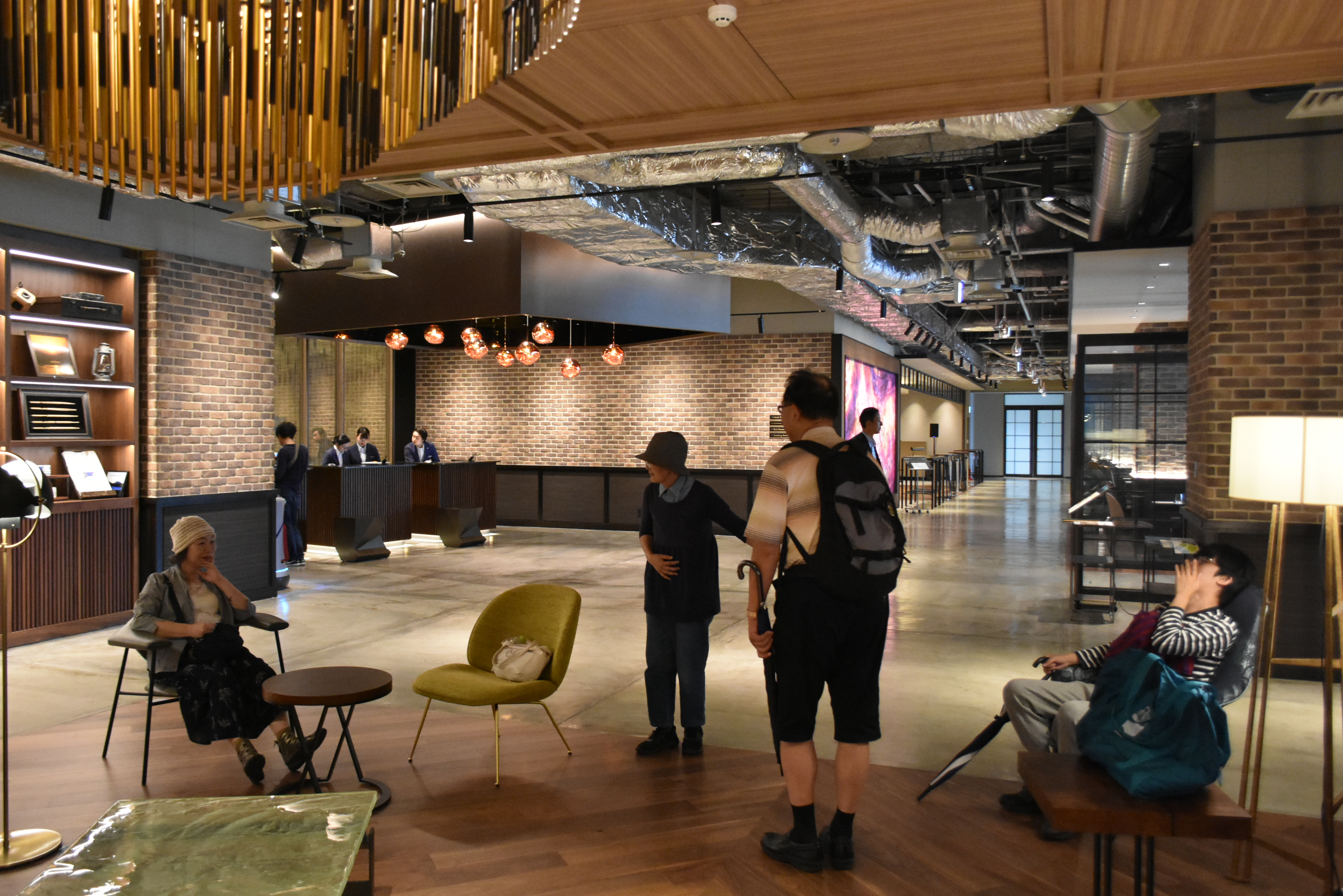
Lobby of the Excel Tokyu Shibuya Stream

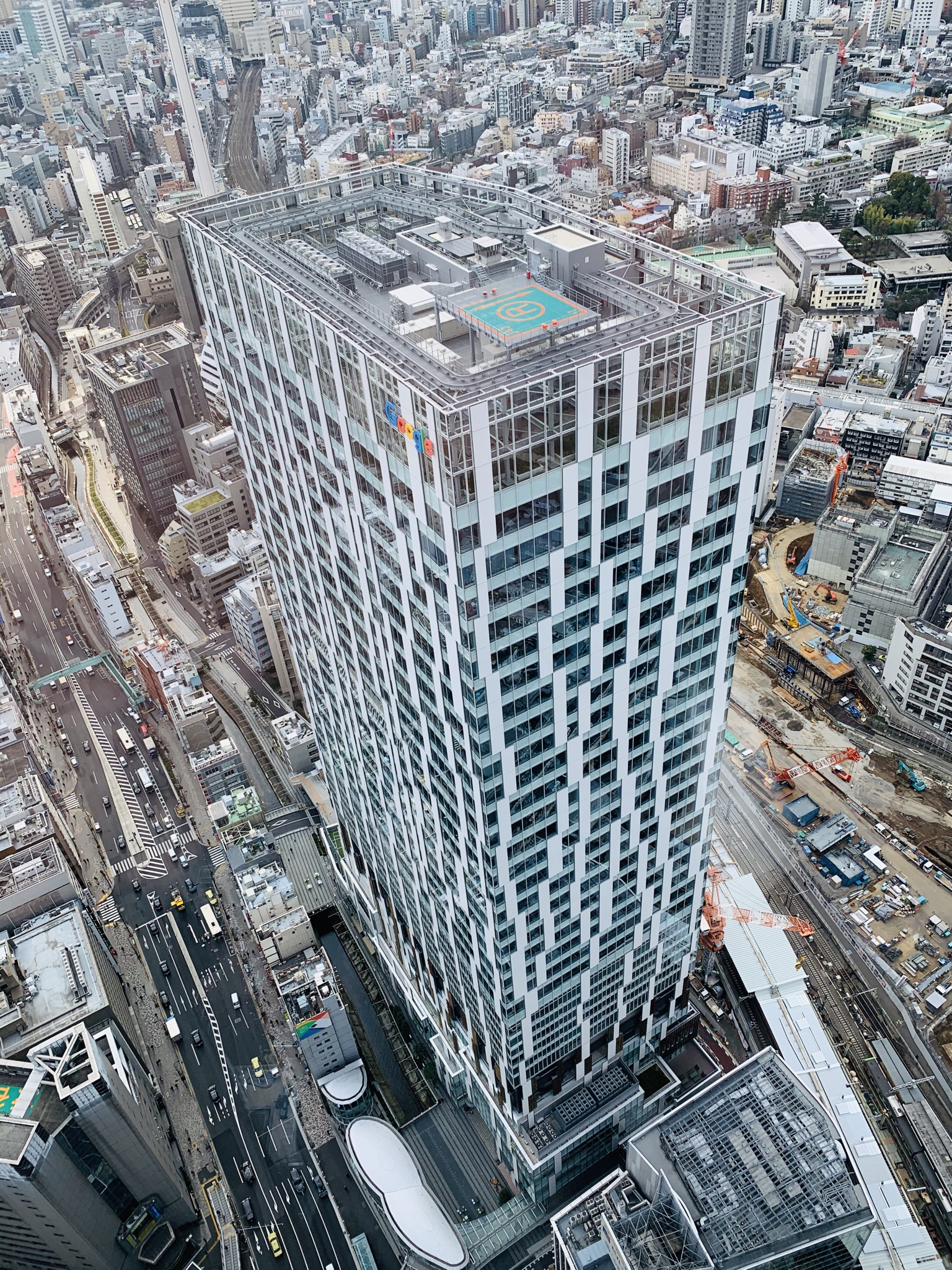
overlooking from SHIBUYA SKY
