= List of Digimon Ghost Game episodes =

Digimon Ghost Game
- No. of episodes: 67 + 1 special

Release
- Original network: Fuji TV
- Original release: October 3, 2021 – March 26, 2023

Season chronology
- ← Previous; Digimon Adventure: (2020 series) Next → Digimon Beatbreak

Digimon Ghost Game is a Japanese anime series and the ninth incarnation of the Digimon franchise, which aired on Fuji TV in Japan from October 3, 2021, to March 26, 2023, replacing Digimon Adventure: in its timeslot. Wienners performs the opening theme, "FACTION". The ending themes are "Pedal" by Aiiro Apollo (episodes 1–12), "Because I've Been Lovesick" by BMK (episodes 13–21), "Hikariau Monotachi" by Bye-Bye-Hand (episodes 22–31), "Monster Disco", written and sung by Shikao Suga and arranged by Hyadain (episodes 32–44), "Strawberry" by Kobore (episodes 45–57), and "Take Me Maybe" by Penthouse (episodes 58–67).

Digimon Ghost Game is distributed simultaneously by Crunchyroll in North America, Central America, South America, Europe, Africa, Oceania, the MENA and CIS zones with English, Spanish, French, Portuguese, Arabic, Italian, German and Russian subtitles.

An English dub of the series premiered on BBC iPlayer in the United Kingdom on December 1, 2025.

== Episode list ==
No.	English version titles (Note: All English episode titles taken from Crunchyroll and BBC.)	Directed and storyboarded by (Note: Information is taken from the ending credits of each episode.)	Written by	Original release date	English release date
1	The Sewn-lip Man; Transliteration: "Kuchi Nui Otoko" (Japanese: 口縫男)	Directed by : Ayaka Noro; Storyboarded by : Masatoshi Chioka, Ayaka Noro & Naotoshi Shida	Atsuhiro Tomioka & Masashi Sogo	October 3, 2021	December 1, 2025
Amidst rumors of a ghost with a sewn mouth stealing time from students and causing them to age rapidly, Hiro Amanokawa's father, Hokuto, mysteriously disappears, leaving behind a message entrusting him with looking after the ceratopsian Digimon Gammamon. He also learns of the existence of Digimon after receiving a Digivice, which allows him to see them. Hiro and Gammamon confront the culprit, the Digimon Clockmon, and defeat him, but he flees.
2	The Mystery of the Museum; Transliteration: "Hakubutsukan no Kai" (Japanese: 博物館ノ怪)	Directed by : Ryōta Nakamura; Storyboarded by : Ryōta Nakamura & Masato Mitsuka	Masashi Sogo	October 10, 2021	December 1, 2025
Hiro and Gammamon investigate rumors of a mummy kidnapping people at night and encounter the culprit, the Digimon Mummymon, who believes that he is saving the kidnapped people. During the fight, Gammamon Digivolves into BetelGammamon for the first time, and the situation is resolved when Hiro convinces Mummymon that humans are different from Digimon and that he should modernize his way of helping people. Later, Hiro and Gammamon see Ruli Tsukiyono being followed by an unknown Digimon.
3	Scribbles; Transliteration: "Rakugaki" (Japanese: ラクガキ)	Yōko Ikeda	Masashi Sogo	October 24, 2021	December 1, 2025
People are being afflicted with a curse that causes red scribbles to appear in their digital pictures, with the body part that was scribbled on slowly disappearing. Hiro and Gammamon contact Ruli, one of the victims, whose hands are disappearing, learns from Angoramon, a rabbit Digimon who had been following her, that the curse is the work of the vampire Digimon Dracmon, who seeks to fully materialize into the human world. After receiving a Digivice from Hiro, Ruli materializes Angoramon and defeats Dracmon, who removes the curse and falsely promises to behave before leaving.
4	The Doll's Manor; Transliteration: "Ningyō no Yakata" (Japanese: 人形ノ館)	Akihiro Nakamura	Tomohiro Nakayama	October 31, 2021	December 1, 2025
While Hiro is helping Ruli prepare for her school's Halloween party, the Digimon Pumpkinmon begins abducting students and faculty. They confront him and his companions, a pack of Ekakimon and Candlemon, and learn that he has been lonely since he arrived in the human world. After seeing people putting up jack-o'-lantern decorations that resembled him, he decided to forcibly put decorations on their heads to make them his friends. After convincing him that what he is doing is wrong, Hiro and Ruli rescue the captives and the Halloween party continues.
5	Divine Anger; Transliteration: "Kami no Ikari" (Japanese: 神ノ怒リ)	Yū Kamatani	Masashi Sogo	November 7, 2021	December 1, 2025
Hiro's schoolmate and dorm manager, Kiyoshirō Higashimitarai, claims that he is being haunted by ghosts and, in hopes of warding them off, hacks into computers across the city to install digital talismans. The ghost is revealed to be the mischievous jellyfish Digimon Jellymon, who forces Kiyoshirō to become her partner and converts the digital talismans into malware that take down the city's online transaction system. This attracts the wrath of the dragon Digimon Majiramon and his followers, Goatmon, Quetzalmon, and Rabbitmon. While Hiro and Ruli keep them occupied, Kiyoshirō and Jellymon remove the talismans, restoring the system, and apologize to Majiramon, who spares them.
6	The Cursed Song; Transliteration: "Norowareta Uta" (Japanese: 呪ワレタ歌)	Directed by : Ippo Takatoya, Ryōta Nakamura & Nozomu Shishido; Storyboarded by : Naotoshi Shida	Masashi Sogo	November 14, 2021	December 1, 2025
Hiro and Ruli investigate rumors of a karaoke box being haunted by a ghost, which leads them to meet the Digimon Sirenmon, whose attempts to cheer up others with her music instead scare them. With Kiyoshirō's help, they set a trap for Sirenmon and confront her, convincing her to travel in order to perfect her singing.
7	Birds; Transliteration: "Tori" (Japanese: 鳥)	Hiroyuki Kakudō	Natsumi Moriuchi	November 21, 2021	December 1, 2025
Bird owners are being attacked by a group of crows that release their birds. After Ruli's friend Mika asks her to help her find her missing sparrow, she and Hiro, certain that a Digimon is involved, investigate where the attacks have occurred. Kiyoshirō uncovers the pattern behind the attacks and discovers that the next target is a bird sanctuary that keeps birds of prey. To stop this, they confront the Digimon responsible, the crow Digimon Crowmon, who proves to be too strong for them until Gammamon Digivolves into KausGammamon for the first time and forces Crowmon to flee. After the battle, some of the birds return to their owners, including Mika's, much to her joy.
8	Nightly Procession of Monsters; Transliteration: "Hyakki Yakō" (Japanese: 百鬼夜行)	Directed by : Ayaka Noro; Storyboarded by : Masao Suzuki	Hiroshi Yamaguchi	November 28, 2021	December 1, 2025
Amidst sightings of a group of monsters running through the streets at night, Ruli takes Hiro and Kiyoshirō to a go-kart track, where the Digimon Sistermon Ciel steals one of the karts. As they pursue her, they become involved in a race for survival against MetalPhantomon, who forces participants to race and absorbs those he catches or who try to escape. After learning that the race was Sistermon Ciel's idea, Ruli tricks her into fighting MetalPhantomon until an unknown black cat Digimon appears and opens a portal that returns the participants to the Digital World.
9	Warped Time; Transliteration: "Nejireta Toki" (Japanese: 捻レタ時)	Directed by : Ippo Takatoya; Storyboarded by : Ippo Takatoya & Naotoshi Shida	Masashi Sogo	December 5, 2021	December 1, 2025
Hiro becomes afflicted with a condition that affects his sense of time. In search of an answer, he, along with Ruli and Kiyoshirō, visits a library that has become the subject of rumors of ghost sightings and meets Bokomon and Bakumon, Digimon who have begun researching nearby. They are interrupted when Clockmon attacks Hiro as revenge for his defeat, revealing that he caused his condition. When Gammamon confronts him to protect Hiro, a mass of dark energy from him reflects Clockmon's attack at him, threatening to delete him. In an act of mercy, Gammamon Digivolves into BetelGammamon and uses his powers to reverse the effects of Clockmon's attacks on him, saving his life. After the battle, Clockmon reforms, apologizes to the children for the trouble he caused, and decides to stay with Bokomon and Bakumon at the library to learn to control his powers.
10	Game of Death; Transliteration: "Shi no Yūgi" (Japanese: 死ノ遊戯)	Directed by : Tsutomu Murakami; Storyboarded by : Naotoshi Shida	Toshiaki Satō	December 12, 2021	December 1, 2025
Players of an online fighting game start disappearing after being defeated by an unknown female character. After Hiro's friend Kotaro disappears, they consult with Bokomon and learn that the Digimon siblings Kinkakumon and Ginkakumon are responsible for the kidnappings, containing the players in Ginkakumon's gourd to transform them into saké. Kiyoshirō plays the game to attract Kinkakumon's attention and Jellymon fights Kinkakumon with his help. However, she is overpowered until Kiyoshirō briefly overcomes his cowardice, causing Jellymon to Digivolve into TeslaJellymon for the first time. After defeating Kinkakumon, she and Ginkakumon release the captive players and promise not to abduct people again.
11	Kamaitachi; Transliteration: "Kamaitachi" (Japanese: カマイタチ)	Directed by : Yōko Ikeda; Storyboarded by : Hiroyuki Kakudō	Natsumi Moriuchi	December 19, 2021	December 1, 2025
Following a situation with Angoramon, Ruli wanders off and meets the kamaitachi Digimon Reppamon, who conflicts with his tail, which has a mind of its own.
12	Chain Letter; Transliteration: "Fukō no Tegami" (Japanese: 不幸ノ手紙)	Directed by : Kimiharu Mutō & Michihiro Satō; Storyboarded by : Masao Suzuki	Tomohiro Nakayama	December 26, 2021	December 1, 2025
After Kiyoshiro deletes a chain email he receives from a professor he knows, a swarm of the plant Digimon Weedmon emerges from his video game. They spread throughout the city as more people delete the chain email, growing in size as they consume water. Kiyoshiro opens a lake field in the pseudo-Digital World to lure the Weedmon, who merge into a giant Weedmon that they defeat after Gammamon Digivolves into WezenGammamon for the first time. Another Weedmon with a cane appears and explains that it was the original Weedmon, who created a clone of himself to have a friend after arriving in the human world, but the clone went out of control. Weedmon and his clones leave after promising not to bother humans again.
13	Executioner; Transliteration: "Shokeinin" (Japanese: 処刑人)	Directed by : Akihiro Nakamura; Storyboarded by : Yoshitaka Yashima	Masashi Sogo	January 9, 2022	December 1, 2025
The group investigates an urban legend about a Digimon known as "the Executioner" who is killing other Digimon indiscriminately. They formulate a plan to defeat the Executioner and discover that it is Sealsdramon, who seeks to kill 1,000 Digimon. In the resulting confrontation, Bokomon is deleted while protecting Gammamon, causing Gammamon to fall into despair and Digivolve into the violent GulusGammamon, who kills Sealsdramon before reverting back to Gammamon. Afterwards, a mysterious black Agumon is seen to have been watching the battle.
14	Zashiki-warashi; Transliteration: "Zashiki Warashi" (Japanese: 座敷童)	Hiroyuki Kakudō	Natsumi Moriuchi	January 16, 2022	December 1, 2025
Hiro and Ruli accompany Kiyoshiro to a resort where he is attending a conference, with Hiro trying to cheer up Gammamon following Bokomon's death. However, the resort is haunted by the monkey Digimon Monmon, whose pranks are becoming more frequent.
15	The Fortuneteller's Manor; Transliteration: "Uranai no Yakata" (Japanese: 占イノ館)	Directed by : Ayaka Noro; Storyboarded by : Tetsuya Endō	Hiroshi Yamaguchi	January 23, 2022	December 1, 2025
Ruli helps her friend Mika find Mephisto, a traveling fortune-teller who can solve any problem. Meanwhile, Jellymon rummages through junk in search of a bargain and finds a petrified statue of a young woman. Mephisto is revealed to be Feresmon, a demon Digimon who has been turning people to stone to keep ideal specimens for his collection. During the fight, Angromon Digivolves into Symbare Angoramon for the first time to defeat him.
16	The Maneater's Forest; Transliteration: "Hitokui no Mori" (Japanese: 人喰ノ森)	Directed by : Norio Kajima; Storyboarded by : Akira Nishimori	Toshiaki Satō	January 30, 2022	December 1, 2025
Hiro takes Gammamon camping with him and learns from the campground manager that recently, campers have been leaving without paying, as if they had been spirited away. While camping, Hiro and Gammamon hear a scream from the nearby forest and enter it, where people who enter are led astray by an eerie mist and go missing. While surrounded by the mist, Hiro's group becomes involved in a turf war between the turtle mollusk Digimon MoriShellmon and cherry tree Digimon Cherrymon.
17	Icy Hell; Transliteration: "Gokkan Jigoku" (Japanese: 極寒地獄)	Directed by : Ippo Takatoya; Storyboarded by : Hiroyuki Kakudō & Ippo Takatoya	Masashi Sogo	February 6, 2022	December 1, 2025
Kiyoshiro takes the group to visit a geothermal power plant that he helped set up when they find themselves in freezing temperatures. With Hiro and Kiyoshiro frozen solid, Ruli and TeslaJellymon must work together to stop the snowplow Digimon Frozomon from freezing over the plant.
18	The Land of Children; Transliteration: "Kodomo no Kuni" (Japanese: 子供ノ国)	Directed by : Noriyo Sasaki; Storyboarded by : Tetsuji Nakamura	Tomohiro Nakayama	February 13, 2022	December 1, 2025
The group encounters a pair of eagle Digimon, Hawkmon, who are looking for their missing human friend, Kazuma. While Kiyoshiro and Jellymon investigate in Hiro's stead, they learn that the Digimon Petermon is abducting human children and rookie-level Digimon.
19	The Witching Hour; Transliteration: "Ōmagatoki" (Japanese: 逢魔ガ時)	Hiroyuki Kakudō	Natsumi Moriuchi	February 20, 2022	December 1, 2025
After Gammamon disappears while on an errand for Hiro, Hiro and Ruli are sent back into the past by the Digimon Piximon.
20	Prison of Fire; Transliteration: "Honō no Kangoku" (Japanese: 炎ノ監獄)	Yūta Tanaka	Toshiaki Satō	February 27, 2022	December 1, 2025
While at an amusement park, the group encounters the fire dragon Digimon DarkLizardmon and the giant bird Digimon Saberdramon, who are looking for BlackGatomon, who has been delivering packages to Hiro. When Hiro is unable to answer them, they attack him and reveal that they wish to return home to the Digital World after humans shunned them for accidentally killing a human that they attempted to save from a house fire.
21	The Spider's Lure; Transliteration: "Kumo no Yūwaku" (Japanese: 蜘蛛ノ誘惑)	Directed by : Ayaka Noro; Storyboarded by : Kōnosuke Uda	Hiroshi Yamaguchi	March 6, 2022	December 1, 2025
Hiro meets a scientist who claims to be a colleague of his mother and knows of Gammamon's existence, inviting him and his friends to an insect exhibit at the mall. However, this is revealed to be a trap, as the woman reveals her true identity as Arukenimon, a sadistic arachnid Digimon who feeds on human brains. In the ensuing fight, Gammamon kills Arukenimon as GulusGammamon and warns Hiro to keep his distance from him before reverting to Gammamon.
22	Nightmare; Transliteration: "Akumu" (Japanese: 悪夢)	Directed by : Kyōsuke Yamazaki; Storyboarded by : Yōko Ikeda	Ryō Yamazaki	April 17, 2022 (Note: Episode 22 was originally scheduled to air on March 20, 2022, but the series' entire schedule was subsequently delayed until further notice shortly after Toei Animation revealed their internal servers had been hacked by an unauthorized third party.)	December 1, 2025
Jellymon starts a new business, "Cherry Blossom Sleep Therapy", with the pillow Digimon Pillowmon, a Digimon that brings restful sleep, in order to provide restful sleep beneath cherry blossoms. However, the participants begin to suffer from pain and injuries in their sleep. Ruli and Angoramon, who participated in the sleep therapy, are attacked by the skeleton Digimon SkullGreymon in their dreams and attempt to escape. However, they return to SkullGreymon in a looping nightmare and, in the real world, injuries begin to appear on their bodies.
23	Moaning Bug; Transliteration: "Umeku Mushi" (Japanese: ウメク蟲)	Nozomu Shishido	Natsumi Moriuchi	April 24, 2022	December 1, 2025
Hiro and his friends learn from Clockmon of a phenomenon where Digimon turn violent during red moon nights, with Gammamon, Angoramon, and Jellymon running off after attacking their partners. After visiting Mummymon on the possibility that their Digimon could be sick, Clockmon's surveillance reveals that they are affected by the empathy-inducing scales of the butterfly Digimon Morphomon, who is being held captive by a scientist.
24	Twisted Love; Transliteration: "Yuganda Ai" (Japanese: 歪ンダ愛)	Directed by : Michihiro Satō; Storyboarded by : Masao Suzuki	Tomohiro Nakayama	May 1, 2022	December 1, 2025
Hiro is visited by Yuuto Takanashi, a high school student who is afflicted by a phenomenon that causes those who interact with him to have their limbs transformed into ivy. The group investigates and learn that the culprit is Ajatarmon, a plant Digimon in love with Yuuto who seeks to turn him into a Digimon like herself.
Special	A Strange World As Told By Naoto Takenaka; Transliteration: "Takenaka Naoto ga Kataru Kaiki no Sekai" (Japanese: 竹中直人が語る怪奇の世界)	Unknown	Unknown	May 8, 2022	N/A
25	The Crimson Banquet; Transliteration: "Kurenai no Kyōen" (Japanese: 紅ノ饗宴)	Directed by : Akihiro Nakamura; Storyboarded by : Akira Nishimori	Masashi Sogo	May 15, 2022	December 1, 2025
Ruli is invited to the trendsetter company Scarlatto Vento and encounters Dracmon, who is killed for his defiance by its CEO Aviel Kyogoku. Aviel is revealed to be the vampire Digimon Myotismon, who is transforming women influencers into vampires to have them convert other humans. Ruli flees to the roof as the group arrives to save her, only to be overpowered by Myotismon's minions while BetelGammamon is infected by one of Myotismon's bats. However, Hiro Digivolves BetelGammamon into the draconic Canoweissmon for the first time and drives off Myotismon and his servants, breaking the spell over his victims.
26	Cannibal Mansion; Transliteration: "Kiga Yashiki" (Japanese: 飢餓屋敷)	Hiroyuki Kakudō	Hiroshi Yamaguchi	May 22, 2022	December 1, 2025
Angoramon reunites with his friend, the egg Digimon Digitamamon, who lives alone in an empty house. Angoramon brings Ruli with him to visit, but notices that Digitamamon is acting strangely while the group learns of a rumor about the vacant house where Digitamamon lives. When Angoramon finds him attempting to eat Ruli, Digitamamon reveals that his arrival to the human world caused him to develop an uncontrollable hunger for human souls. After a battle, SymbareAngoramon is forced to kill Digitamamon, who, before dying, questions if Angoramon is still a Digimon or if he is a human now.
27	Monster's Beauty Serum; Transliteration: "Biyōeki" (Japanese: 美妖液)	Directed by : Noriyo Sasaki; Storyboarded by : Azuma Tani	Toshiaki Satō	May 29, 2022	December 1, 2025
Hiro investigates a rumor of people disappearing when the sound of water dripping is heard, with his dorm's caretaker, Niijima, being transformed into an orb of water by the Digimon Splashmon.
28	Face Taker; Transliteration: "Kao Tori" (Japanese: 顔取リ)	Directed by : Tomohiro Matsukawa; Storyboarded by : Masao Suzuki	Ryō Yamazaki	June 5, 2022	December 1, 2025
The group checks in on their classmate Kotaro Nomura, who has isolated himself in his dorm for several days. They learn that his face was stolen by the four-armed Digimon Asuramon, who went rogue from his desire to experience human emotions and steals Ruli and Kiyoshiro's faces.
29	Monster Pollen; Transliteration: "Yō Kafun" (Japanese: 妖花粉)	Directed by : Kohei Hatano; Storyboarded by : Azuma Tani	Natsumi Moriuchi	June 12, 2022	December 1, 2025
One afternoon, Kiyoshiro and Jellymon meet a lost girl named Yuina at a department store. Kiyoshiro attempts to take her to a lost child center, but is stopped as a swarm of spider KoDokugumon attacks, and a poisonous fog surrounds the store. Hiro and Ruli hear about the commotion and investigate, but due to being unable to contact Kiyoshiro, Angoramon investigates from the skies when he senses the presence of the plant dragon Digimon Toropiamon.
30	Bad Friend; Transliteration: "Akuyū" (Japanese: 悪友)	Directed by : Kyōsuke Yamazaki; Storyboarded by : Morio Hatano	Tomohiro Nakayama	June 19, 2022	December 1, 2025
Stuffed animal Digimon ExTyranomon and WaruMonzaemon befriend student Kayono Aramaki, who warms up to them when they turn her father and homeroom teacher into dolls. As their friendship grows, ExTyranomon and WaruMonzaemon grow in stature and turn Kayono's childhood friend, Aoi, into a doll. This attracts the attention of a concerned Ruli as the group investigates and encounters the teddy bear Digimon Monzaemon, while ExTyranomon and WaruMonzaemon talk Kayono into helping them expand their doll collection for a game.
31	Killer Blade; Transliteration: "Tsujigiri" (Japanese: 辻斬リ)	Hiroyuki Kakudō	Hiroshi Yamaguchi	June 26, 2022	December 1, 2025
Angoramon learns of a tsujigiri Digimon who is attacking humans and Digimon and encounters it, learning that it is being controlled by the spirit of Musyamon. Musyamon is a samurai Digimon that was absorbed into his Shiratorimaru katana when he entered the human world, who he is using it to help reconstruct his body with Digimon data. After receiving the katana, despite Angoramon's willpower, he falls under Musyamon's control while being challenged by Musyamon's rival, Zubamon.
32	Who Are You? Transliteration: "Omae wa Dareda" (Japanese: オマエハ誰ダ)	Directed by : Ayaka Noro; Storyboarded by : Hiroyuki Kakudō & Ayaka Noro	Shinzō Fujita	July 3, 2022	December 1, 2025
Gammamon's daily routine is disrupted when he is stood up by his friend, the golem Digimon Gotsumon, and then informed by Hiro of being somewhere supposed to be. The next day, Gammamon learns his identity was stolen by a Betsumon, whose fellow Betsumon intend to take over the dormitory by stealing the students' identities.
33	Whispers of the Dead; Transliteration: "Shiryō no Sasayaki" (Japanese: 死霊ノ囁キ)	Ippo Takatoya	Toshiaki Satō	July 10, 2022	December 1, 2025
Following a near-death experience, Kiyoshiro is haunted by a voice while experiencing a series of dangerous incidents that seem to be trying to kill him. After one accident succeeds, Kiyoshiro learns that the voice was Sepikmon, a masked monkey Digimon that lives between life and death and seeks to befriend him.
34	Wall Crawlers; Transliteration: "Kabe Hau Mono" (Japanese: 壁這ウ者)	Directed by : Akihiro Nakamura; Storyboarded by : Azuma Tani	Hiroshi Yamaguchi	July 17, 2022	December 1, 2025
Hiro and Gammamon return home to clean house and encounter a gecko-like human who Hiro recognizes as a neighborhood friend he knew from elementary school. The next morning, Hiro goes to his friend's house to search for clues and learns that a Salamandermon is transforming kids, including Ruli, into lizard-people to steal diamonds and fuel her flames.
35	Werewolf; Transliteration: "Hito Ōkami" (Japanese: 人狼)	Yōko Ikeda	Natsumi Moriuchi	July 24, 2022	December 1, 2025
Hiro's group visits Ruli's relatives in Hitoyo-machi to investigate a rumor of a werewolf sighting, learning that Ruli's family has ties to a local legend where a member of the Tsukiyono family is offered as a sacrifice to appease a werewolf that attacks the townsfolk every century. The culprit is revealed to be Manticoremon, a pet of the angel Digimon D'Arcmon that acted out the Hitoyo legend after accidentally consuming data on it. However, it is defeated after Angoramon Digivolves into Lamortmon, for the first time.
36	Labyrinth of Grief; Transliteration: "Nageki no Meikyū" (Japanese: 嘆キノ迷宮)	Directed by : Ryō Nanba; Storyboarded by : Masao Suzuki	Tomohiro Nakayama	July 31, 2022	December 1, 2025
The group investigates a rumor about "disappearing buildings", with their search taking them to a cave along with Kazu, Piyochin, Iizuka, and Niko, online friends that they met through an urban legend forum. However, the group is trapped in a cave-in and the members begin to disappear as sobbing is heard. The culprit is revealed to be Gigasmon, who was turning people to stone to preserve them after taking the film trailer of an environmental disaster film literally and believed that disaster would soon strike.
37	Horde of the Dead; Transliteration: "Shiryō no Mure" (Japanese: 死霊ノ群レ)	Hiroyuki Kakudō	Shinzō Fujita	August 7, 2022	December 1, 2025
The group visits a lakeside town to refresh Kiyoshiro after he did programming work for a global corporation. However, their vacation is interrupted with rumors of skeletal zombies in the nearby mountains that zombify whatever they touch. The group fights off the zombified townfolk before pursuing the skeletal zombies to an illegal industrial waste dump in the mountains. They find the culprit to be RareRaremon, who implanted parts of itself in the zombies and has been feeding on zombified wildlife and humans in an attempt to repair its damaged body. Though reluctant to kill, they kill it to put it out of its misery.
38	The Diviner; Transliteration: "Onmyōji" (Japanese: 陰陽師)	Directed by : Kenta Nishi; Storyboarded by : Azuma Tani	Masashi Sogo	August 14, 2022	December 1, 2025
Hiro heads with Kotaro to Kamakura to help their sister school, Youoh Academy, which is located in Kamakura, in its traditional Wakagimi Dance, with Hiro becoming an understudy after the girl who had the role of the wakagimi falls ill. During the production of the dance, Hiro encounters the onmyōji Digimon Doumon, who is possessed by spirits of the Hojo Clan that seek to re-establish the bakufu period in Kamakura. They possess Hiro to use as a vessel for their young lord, and Gammamon gets help from the wandering Digimon Espimon to break Doumon's spell.
39	Contagion Island; Transliteration: "Kansen Kotō" (Japanese: 感染孤島)	Directed by : Kohei Hatano; Storyboarded by : Hiroyuki Kakudō	Natsumi Moriuchi	August 21, 2022	December 1, 2025
Hiro and Gammamon are visited by the Digimon Gyukimon, who seeks their help. Though Angoramon reveals that Gyukimon are a dreaded Digimon species that turn those they bite into more Gyukimon, Gyukimon reveals that he was a Ryudamon who assumed this form. He assures them that he has no intention of harming them, despite considering leaving them for their own safety. However, after coming with the group to their field trip on an island facility, Gyukimon begins losing control of himself and bits some of Hiro's classmates while growing in size. The group manages to restore him to his rookie form, with Bakumon restoring the injected humans and altering their memories of the incident.
40	Spiral Beach; Transliteration: "Rasen Kaigan" (Japanese: 螺旋海岸)	Ayako Hiraike	Hiroshi Yamaguchi	August 28, 2022	December 1, 2025
Gammamon refuses to speak to Hiro after being blamed for biting his tablet. During their argument, Espimon returns, revealing that his arms and several objects around a beach have been twisted. They leave with Jellymon, as everyone else is unavailable. Upon arriving, Gammamon befriends a local girl and considers leaving Hiro, but he and Hiro must reconcile after discovering that culprit is the squid-like Digimon Calmaramon, who finds beauty in spirals.
41	Clown; Transliteration: "Dōkeshi" (Japanese: 道化師)	Directed by : Kyōsuke Yamazaki; Storyboarded by : Morio Hatano	Toshiaki Satō	September 4, 2022	December 1, 2025
While watching a show from the Pierre Dream Circus, Ruli picks a pamphlet with a QR code for a special show. After scanning the QR code at night, TobuCatmon and FlameWizardmon arrive and kidnap Angoramon, who witnesses the clown Digimon Piedmon transforming children into playing cards. Hiro, Gammamon, and Ruli return to the circus and fight Piedmon's lackeys before Ruli defeats Piedmon in a card game and orders him to return the children to normal, which he does before leaving with the Pierre Dream Circus.
42	Human Hunter; Transliteration: "Hito Gari" (Japanese: 人狩リ)	Hiroki Fukuoka	Shinzō Fujita	September 11, 2022	December 1, 2025
After learning from Ruli, who sent him a message that the sister of her friend Miori was abducted by oni, Hiro and the group head to a nearby city to investigate. They learn that a group of Oboromon are responsible, hunting humans as part of a color game where the winner becomes the group's new leader.
43	Red Eye; Transliteration: "Akame" (Japanese: 赤目)	Directed by : Ayaka Noro; Storyboarded by : Hiroyuki Kakudō & Ayaka Noro	Ryō Yamazaki	September 18, 2022	December 1, 2025
Kiyoshiro is visited by Emma Haynes, an acquaintance from his time studying abroad, and fears that she might learn of the existence of Digimon. While taking her on a tour of Tokyo, she feels pain when she pries into someone, as she is one of several people possessed by the Digimon Eyesmon.
44	Rust; Transliteration: "Akasabi" (Japanese: 赤錆)	Ippo Takatoya	Tomohiro Nakayama	September 25, 2022	December 1, 2025
A rumor spreads in Hazakura Academy that first-year student Riku Fukatsu can get you whatever you ask for, while Hiro learns from Espimon of a phenomenon that when those living in a condo hear whispering in the middle of the night, the building shakes. Hīrō investigates the building, where he finds rust and cracks, and begins to suspect a connection between Fukatsu and the "Reward Elves", who Ruli tells him are dwarves who deliver things that people want. After he finds the website that Fukatsu had found, the Reward Elves are revealed to be a trio of the rabbit Digimon Antylamon, who are unintentionally destroying buildings in order to create items that humans request.
45	Ghost Newspaper; Transliteration: "Yūrei Shinbun" (Japanese: 幽霊新聞)	Directed by : Satoshi Takafuji; Storyboarded by : Masao Suzuki	Natsumi Moriuchi	October 2, 2022	December 1, 2025
The group receives the mysterious news e-mail "Bubbly News", which contains an article describing what will happen the next day. Though initially harmless, these accidents soon escalate, with people named in the articles ending up in accidents, including Kiyoshiro and Ruli's friends. They learn from a new article that a member of the idol group D★topics has died and Kiyoshiro, who is a fan of D★topics, is shocked by this news and becomes determined to protect its members. The group infiltrates the TV station and learn that the "Bubbly News" editor is the Digimon Publimon, who was making his predictions a reality while taking out critics.
46	The Queen's Banquet; Transliteration: "Joō no Bansan" (Japanese: 女王ノ晩餐)	Akihiro Nakamura	Hiroshi Yamaguchi	October 9, 2022	December 1, 2025
Hiro notices that Kotaro is becoming increasingly afraid of water, which he learns is because, ever since he went swimming in the pool, he has been experiencing hallucinations whenever he sees water. Thinking that this could be the work of a Digimon, the group investigates and learns that the Digimon Oleamon was responsible, preparing Kotaro as a meal due to a misunderstanding she had with Hokuto.
47	Eternal Memories; Transliteration: "Eien no Kioku" (Japanese: 永遠ノ記憶)	Hiroyuki Kakudō	Toshiaki Satō	October 16, 2022	December 1, 2025
The moth Digimon Shadramon is dying and fears losing his memories from being reset back into a Digiegg, only for a voice to offer him a way to survive. The next day, at a university laboratory, Kiyoshiro notices that his friend Tamotsu Ihara is acting strangely and follows him, learning of an experiment conducted by Datamon to reincarnate Shadramon through a human body.
48	The White Bride; Transliteration: "Shiroi Hanayome" (Japanese: 白イ花嫁)	Directed by : Kohei Hatano; Storyboarded by : Masao Suzuki	Shinzō Fujita	October 23, 2022	December 1, 2025
The group arrives at a wedding venue in the highlands to help Ruli's friend Akane Kubota with her wedding. Ruli models for the wedding venue's brochure and puts on a wedding dress for the photo shoot, but spores start falling from her and mushrooms grow out of her body. This is the work of the mushroom-like Chamblemon, who are using happy brides to grow mushrooms that they eat for sustenance. Hiro, Gammamon, and Kiyoshiro fall victim to the spores, but the Chamblemon are defeated after showing a surprising reaction when they eat the mushrooms growing from Kiyoshiro's body.
49	The Crimson Harvest Festival; Transliteration: "Shinku no Shūkakusai" (Japanese: 真紅ノ収穫祭)	Directed by : Ryō Nanba; Storyboarded by : Hiroyuki Kakudō	Tomohiro Nakayama	October 30, 2022	December 1, 2025
The group prepares for a Halloween party, but it is crashed by Witchmon, who appear every Halloween to turn those who wear witch costumes into real witches and those in other costumes into mice.
50	Payback; Transliteration: "Okaeshi" (Japanese: オカエシ)	Yoshihiro Ueda	Natsumi Moriuchi	November 6, 2022	December 1, 2025
Riku Fukazu is lonely after having recently moved from Osaka to Hazakura Academy, which attracts the Digimon Pucchiemon, who helps him open up with his peers. While Hiro and Kiyoshiro are glad they are getting along, Hiro realizes that Pucchiemon is in love with Riku. After Pucchiemon Digivolves into Meicrackmon Vicious Mode to force Riku into loving her back, the group subdues her and explains that romantic relationships between humans and Digimon are impossible. However, she misinterprets their intent and runs off, heartbroken.
51	Headless; Transliteration: "Kubi Nashi" (Japanese: 首ナシ)	Yōko Ikeda	Hiroshi Yamaguchi	November 13, 2022	December 1, 2025
A rumor spreads about headless ghosts wearing suits of armor that are targeting students of Hazakura Academy. After Kiyoshiro is attacked and rushed to the hospital, Hiro investigates and learns that culprit is DarkKnightmon, who turns the souls of those he attacks into his helpers to aid in retrieving his missing head.
52	Mysterious Lake; Transliteration: "Ayakashi no Mizuumi" (Japanese: 妖ノ湖)	Directed by : Kenta Nishi; Storyboarded by : Hiroki Fukuoka	Masashi Sogo	November 20, 2022	December 1, 2025
Ruli convinces the group to visit a lake rumored to have kappa that abduct visitors. However, the kappa are revealed to be Gwappamon, who kidnap Ruli for their boss, Shaujinmon.
53	King of Knowledge; Transliteration: "Chishiki Ō" (Japanese: 知識王)	Directed by : Ayaka Noro; Storyboarded by : Hiroyuki Kakudō & Ayaka Noro	Toshiaki Satō	November 27, 2022	December 1, 2025
During a group school trip in Kyoto, Kiyoshiro visits a shrine where he shares his knowledge. This attracts the attention of Baalmon, a Digimon that resides in a book. He forces Kiyoshiro to come to a deserted shrine and accept his challenge; a game of riddles where the winner gains knowledge or loses it from not answering.
54	Second Sight; Transliteration: "Senrigan" (Japanese: 千里眼)	Directed by : Kohei Hatano; Storyboarded by : Morio Hatano	Shinzō Fujita	December 4, 2022	December 1, 2025
Hiro is afflicted by a Fujitsumon that attaches itself to his head, which gives him clairvoyance, but also a migraine and a horn from the resulting symbiosis. Ruli and Kiyoshiro call Octomon for help, who reveals that he and his Fujitsumon had a falling out, with the Fujitsumon attaching themselves to various humans and Digimon. The only way to save Hiro and the others from turning into Octomon is to convince the Fujitsumon's leader, who attached to Espimon and forces him to attack the group.
55	Bakeneko; Transliteration: "Bakeneko" (Japanese: 化ケ猫)	Ippo Takatoya	Tomohiro Nakayama	December 11, 2022	December 1, 2025
While Hiro sees a news report of a young girl who was rescued after awakening atop a rooftop billboard on a multi-tenant building, Gammamon helps Riku care for stray cats Choro and Noro. That night, Choro appears, having been transformed into a nekomata, and bewitches the sleeping Kiyoshiro into hopping along the rooftops. Hiro witnesses this before he and Gammamon are also bewitched into making their way to a pet cemetery. There, they learn that the culprit is Beastmon, who is rooting an ideal pet from the bewitched victims in a series of life and death scenarios.
56	Impurity; Transliteration: "Kegare" (Japanese: 穢レ)	Nozomu Shishido	Hiroshi Yamaguchi	December 18, 2022	December 1, 2025
People begin to display a compulsion for cleanliness, including Kiyoshiro, and Hiro and Ruli discover that they are being transformed into wooden puppets. Ruli is captured by the culprit, Kuzuhamon, who intends to remove "impurities" from people by extracting their souls and preparing a ritual to "purify" them. Kuzuhamon attacks Hiro, but he and Gammamon fight back, with Gammamon Digivolving into his Mega evolution, Siriusmon, for the first time, and defeat her. After recognizing that Hiro and Gammamon's bond is special, Kuzuhamon gives up on the ritual and returns her victims to normal.
57	Ghost Taxi; Transliteration: "Yūrei Takushī" (Japanese: 幽霊タクシー)	Directed by : Ryō Nanba; Storyboarded by : Yōko Furuya	Natsumi Moriuchi	December 25, 2022	December 1, 2025
After attending a Christmas held at a church with Hiro, Gammamon leaves with Kotaro and they take a black taxi back to the dormitory. However, they learn that the taxi is a front as they find themselves trapped while being interrogated by the demonic Digimon Lilithmon over the location of angel-type Digimon she is hunting along with her pet Cerberumon. As Lilithmon subjects Gammamon and Kotaro to her miasma to force their compliance, Hiro finds her previous victim lying outside the church.
58	Pyramid; Transliteration: "Kinjitō" (Japanese: 金字塔)	Hiroyuki Kakudō	Toshiaki Satō	January 8, 2023	December 1, 2025
Kaoru, a friend from the piano class Ruli that once attended, has gone missing. While searching for her, Hiro is asked a mysterious riddle that he fails to answer and is turned into a golden brick. Kaoru's disappearance is revealed to be the work of the sphinx Digimon AncientSphinxmon, who has been turning people into bricks in order to build a pyramid and revive his master, Pharaohmon. During the fight, Angoramon Digivolves into Diarbbitmon for the first time and unsuccessfully attempts to save AncientSphinxmon from a portal he created.
59	Jiraiya; Transliteration: "Jiraiya" (Japanese: 児雷也)	Directed by : Takao Kiriyama; Storyboarded by : Hiroki Fukuoka	Tomohiro Nakayama	January 15, 2023	December 1, 2025
Kiyoshiro goes out of town for work and meets Meru. After seeing a sentai action show together, Kiyoshiro encounters the Digimon TonosamaGekomon, who forces him to accompany him as Jiraiya and vanquish evil.
60	Water Ghost; Transliteration: "Mizu no Yūrei" (Japanese: 水ノ幽霊)	Akihiro Nakamura	Shinzō Fujita	January 22, 2023	December 1, 2025
The passengers aboard a cruise ship are soaked in a strange water that causes them to expel data in the form of water. The group arrives at a nearby city to participate in a local festival, only for the inhabitants to suffer from the same phenomena. As the city floods, they run to higher ground and encounter Submarimon, who reveals that the water was created by a group of Divermon. He accompanies them to a nearby shrine, where they discover a mummified body that is actually a dehydrated Cthyllamon, the leader of the Divermon. Refusing to restore the villagers, Cthyllamon and the Divermon attack Hiro and Ruli and put them under their control, leaving Kiyoshiro to fight them alone. During the fight, Kiyoshiro's bond with Thetismon allows her to Digivolve into Amphimon for the first time. She defeats them and convinces them to restore the humans they attacked, which they agree to.
61	Resurrection; Transliteration: "Yomi Gaeri" (Japanese: ヨミガエリ)	Directed by : Ayaka Noro; Storyboarded by : Masao Suzuki	Natsumi Moriuchi	January 29, 2023	December 1, 2025
At the Madarius Physics Research Center, Manami Jinno is studying warped space when an accident kills her. One night, Kotoha, the sister of Toru Igashira, whom Manami was to marry, awakens and sees Manami walking around the house. The group goes to investigate, during which more strange events begin to happen. Toru eventually returns home, causing Manami to start moving and talking. As Kotoha tries to convince Toru of Manami's death, Manami notices the group and absorbs energy from Toru, Kotoha, and Kiyoshiro while groups of Vilemon and Tsumemon watch. ZeedMillenniummon emerges from within Manami and her voice appears from inside ZeedMillenniummon, revealing that Moon=Millenniummon emerged from a gate during the accident that killed her and hid in her body, using her memories to trick Toru in order to absorb energy from him its revival. Though reluctant to kill her, Manami reveals that she is ZeedMillenniummon's weak spot and Siriusmon and Diarbbitmon defeat ZeedMillenniummon, who reverts to Moon=Millenniummon. Afterwards, Toru accepts Manami's death and, though Moon=Millenniummon is now dormant, Hiro decides to keep an eye on it.
62	The Strange Floor; Transliteration: "Maboroshi no Kai" (Japanese: 幻ノ階)	Directed by : Kohei Hatano; Storyboarded by : Morio Hatano	Hiroshi Yamaguchi	February 5, 2023	December 1, 2025
Strange events occurring at Aoi's apartment are causing people to move away, with it being rumored to be haunted. Espimon decides to move out of Hiro's room in order to find the real Hiro and enters Aoi's apartment, where he sees a room filled with sand. Ruli goes to Aoi's apartment to investigate, but a Hiyarimon calling the elevator causes Aoi to become trapped on the 13.5th floor. A voice asks Aoi for a key, but, as she is unable to give the correct answer, keyholes start appearing in her body. The group goes to investigate the building and learn that Digimon are living in rooms abandoned by humans. The Digimon accuse them of interfering with their homes, and the voice throws them away, deciding to separate the 10th to 18th floors from the human world. Espimon finds Aoi and lends her his key, helping her get to the entrance. This causes a contract violation with the voice, ClavisAngemon, who attacks the group. Hiro tries to reason with ClavisAngemon, but he ignores him and seals away Lamortmon and Amphimon with "The Key". As he is about to seal Siriusmon, Espimon begs Hiro to prove that he is the real one by Digivolving him. Hiro synchronizes with Espimon, who Digivolves to HoverEspimon, and helps Siriusmon defeat ClavisAngemon, who returns the floors to normal and agrees to only use the space between floors as Digimon homes.
63	Gluttony; Transliteration: "Bōshoku" (Japanese: 暴食)	Directed by : Tomohiro Matsukawa; Storyboarded by : Hiroki Fukuoka	Masashi Sogo	February 12, 2023	December 1, 2025
After Ruli goes to a cake buffet with her friends, she begins to suffer because no matter how much she eats, nothing satisfies her hunger. This is revealed to be the work of Quartzmon, who was sheltering baby Digimon and sent its copies to masquerade as food that humans would eat in order to give the baby Digimon their energy. After Quartmon leaves, Clockmon informs the group of a mass of Digimon entering the human world.
64	The Call; Transliteration: "Yobigoe" (Japanese: 呼ビ声)	Ippo Takatoya	Natsumi Moriuchi	February 19, 2023	December 1, 2025
Hiro goes fishing with the group and Kotaro. As they head back to the dorm on a ship, they hear chanting as the dorm is shrouded in fog and students begin to act strangely. This is revealed to be the work of Dagoman, who was infected by the GRB particles. After it is returned to the Digital World, Hokuto returns and it is revealed that the Digital World is on the brink of destruction due to the GRB particles.
65	The Black Zone of Death; Transliteration: "Kuro no Kesshiken" (Japanese: 黒ノ決死圏)	Yōko Ikeda	Toshiaki Satō	February 26, 2023	December 1, 2025
As digital communication goes down around the world and Digimon flee to the human world, Hiro learns of a corrosion infecting the Digital World that causes infected Digimon to go berserk and attack other Digimon. The group travels to the Digital World, where a corrupted Rafflesimon attacks them, intent on gaining immortality, and infects them with her spores. However, she is destroyed after GulusGammamon emerges from within Siriusmon and destroys her from the inside. Afterwards, the group heads for an aerial city, but are stopped by BloomLordmon.
66	The Black Dragon of Destruction; Transliteration: "Hametsu no Shikkokuryū" (Japanese: 破滅ノ漆黒竜)	Directed by : Nozomu Shishido; Storyboarded by : Morio Hatano, Nozomu Shishido, Hiroki Fukuoka & Akihiro Nakamura	Masashi Sogo	March 19, 2023	December 1, 2025
BloomLordmon, who has defeated many corrupted Digimon before, confronts the group, refusing to let them pass and meet with the "voice". As he proves to be too powerful for them, Gammamon turns to GulusGammamon's power to defeat him. Though Hiro is able to separate GulusGammamon from Gammamon by synchronizing with him, he Digivolves into Regulusmon and mortally wounds Siriusmon, revealing that he was responsible for spreading the GRB particles in the Digital World.
67	The Devourer of All; Transliteration: "Subete o Kurau Mono" (Japanese: スベテヲ喰ラウモノ)	Directed by : Ryō Nanba; Storyboarded by : Ippo Takatoya, Hiroki Fukuoka, Masato Mitsuka & Akihiro Nakamura	Masashi Sogo	March 26, 2023	December 1, 2025
Regulusmon attempts to absorb an injured Siriusmon, but Hiro, with help from the "voice", who is revealed to be Quantumon, enters Gammamon's mind and heals him. Siriusmon confronts Regulusmon, who reverts to GulusGammamon, and absorbs him into his body, with him and Gammamon sharing a body. Afterwards, Quantumon reveals that she is the ruler of the Digital World, who was responsible for calling the Digimon into the human world, creating the Digivices with help from Hokuto, and sending the black Digimon to monitor GulusGammamon due to them being immune to the GRB particles. As she seeks coexistence between humans and Digimon, she entrusts the group with this task. With Gammamon's consent, GulusGammamon briefly takes control to explain that he's from another planet that was destroyed by an entity that GulusGammamon calls the Endbringer. GulusGammamon warns that the Endbringer will be coming after Earth too, although it won't arrive for another 2,000 years.
