= List of Digimon Adventure (2020 TV series) episodes =

Digimon Adventure:
- Cover of the first Blu-ray box release by Happinet, featuring Tai and Agumon
- No. of episodes: 67

Release
- Original network: Fuji TV
- Original release: April 5, 2020 – September 26, 2021

Season chronology
- ← Previous; Digimon Universe: App Monsters Next → Digimon Ghost Game

Digimon Adventure: is a Japanese anime television series, the eighth incarnation of the Digimon franchise, and a reboot of the original 1999 anime television series of the same name. The series is animated by Toei Animation.

The anime adaptation of the series began airing on Fuji TV in Japan on April 5, 2020. Crunchyroll began streaming the series, starting on April 4. On April 19, Toei Animation announced that new episodes would be delayed due to the COVID-19 pandemic. Toei Animation later announced on June 19 that the series would resume broadcasting new episodes starting with Episode 4 on June 28 after episodes were rebroadcast from Episode 1 beginning June 7.

In February 2022, it was announced that the series would receive an English dub. The first two episodes aired as a special preview at Toei Animation's booth at the Anime NYC 2022 event on November 19, 2022. All episodes were made available for purchase on the Microsoft Store on April 13, 2023.

The opening theme for the series is "Mikakunin Hikousen", performed by Takayoshi Tanimoto in Japanese and by Hans Hessburg in English.

In Japanese, the first ending theme from episodes 1–13 is "Kuyashisa wa Tane", performed by Chiai Fujikawa. The second ending theme from episodes 14–26 is "Q?", performed by Reol. The third ending theme from episodes 27–38 is "Mind Game", performed by Maica n. The fourth ending theme from episodes 39–54 is "Overseas Highway", performed by Wolpis Carter and Orangestar. The fifth and final ending theme from episodes 55–67 is "Dreamers", performed by Ateez. The English version, for the first time in series history, dubbed over songs from the original Japanese version rather than make their own songs. Rather than dub over all of them though, they only dubbed over two of the five ending songs and used those two songs during its duration rather than the five. "Kuyashisa wa Tane" was sung by Cristina Vee (episode 1–38) whilst "Overseas Highway" was sung by Jenny Karr (episode 39–67).

== Episode list ==
No.	English version titles (in brackets, of the subtitled version (Note: All English episode titles taken from Crunchyroll.))	Directed by	Written by	Original release date	English air date
1	"Tokyo Digital Crisis" (Tokyo Digital Crisis); Transliteration: "Tōkyō Dejitaru Kuraishisu" (Japanese: 東京デジタルクライシス)	Masato Mitsuka	Atsuhiro Tomioka	April 5, 2020	November 19, 2022 (preview); April 13, 2023
While preparing for the upcoming school camp, Tai Kamiya is visited by his new neighbor Izzy Izumi when they learn that Tokyo's electronic systems have gone haywire. Realizing that his mother and younger sister, Kari Kamiya, are trapped on an affected runaway train, the two youths run to the nearby station where Tai is suddenly transported to another world inside the internet, encountering a wounded Digimon named Koromon fighting a group of Algomon. A Digivice appears before Tai as Koromon digivolves into Agumon. Another Digivice appears before Izzy and he uses it to inform Tai that the Algomon are responsible for the chaos and Tai and Agumon work together to defeat them. During the fight, Agumon digivolves into Greymon to win the battle, stopping the haywire electronics and saving Tai's family. However, the Algomon take control of the United States Military's network systems. Meanwhile, Tai notices Matt Ishida silently watching the battle from nearby.
2	"War Game" (War Game); Transliteration: "Wō Gēmu" (Japanese: ウォー・ゲーム)	Nozomu Shishido	Atsuhiro Tomioka	April 12, 2020	November 19, 2022 (preview); April 13, 2023
Matt and his partner Garurumon join Tai and Izzy on their mission to stop the Algomon hacking into the U.S. military. The Algomon have hacked into a submarine and are preparing to launch a nuclear missile. Greymon and Garurumon work together to corner the Algomon leader who digivolves into a more powerful form, pushing them back. The missile launches and Izzy learns that its target is Tokyo. With everything on the line, Greymon and Garurumon suddenly combine into Omnimon.
3	"And to the Digital World" (And to the Digital World); Transliteration: "Soshite Dejitaru Wārudo e" (Japanese: そしてデジタルワールドへ)	Hideki Hiroshima	Atsuhiro Tomioka	April 19, 2020	April 13, 2023
Omnimon defeats Algomon and redirects the missile away from Tokyo. Tai and Matt return to their world soon after, with the former befriending Izzy. At summer camp, Tai and Izzy discuss the apparent symbiosis between their world's technology and the Digital World and they meet Tai's childhood friend, Sora Takenouchi. Meanwhile, Eyesmon hatches from a Digi-Egg and causes Tokyo to experience power outages. Izzy estimates that Tokyo's urban functions will cease if the power outages continue for the next 72 hours. Tai, on his way to meet with Izzy to discuss the situation further, suddenly finds himself transported to the Digital World and reunites with Agumon.
4	"Birdramon Soars" (Birdramon Soars); Transliteration: "Bādoramon Hishō" (Japanese: バードラモン飛翔)	Noriyo Sasaki	Ken'ichi Yamashita	June 28, 2020	April 13, 2023
Reunited in the Digital World, Tai and Agumon find Sora, who has also been transported there. After Izzy makes contact from another part of the Network and reveals that he has befriended a Tentomon, Tai's Digivice points a beam of light to a rainbow-colored mountain, indicating their next destination. On the way there, they encounter a Biyomon running from a hostile Snimon. The group escapes their pursuer by jumping into a river and, once at safety, they build a raft to continue their journey. While traveling down the river, a Coelamon ambushes them and Agumon digivolves into Greymon to fight it. Meanwhile, the Snimon returns and captures Biyomon. Sora attempts to rescue her and attains her own Digivice, allowing Biyomon to digivolve into Birdramon and fight Snimon. After both enemies are defeated, Birdramon flies the group to their destination where they find some abandoned ruins. Meanwhile, Izzy and Tentomon are swallowed by a Whamon on their way to the Digital World.
5	"The Celestial Digimon" (The Holy Digimon); Transliteration: "Seinaru Dejimon" (Japanese: 聖なるデジモン)	Kimiharu Mutō	Atsuhiro Tomioka	July 5, 2020	April 13, 2023
At the ruins, Tai and the others are greeted by the spirit of Valdurmon who tells them the story of an ancient war between the Digimon of light and darkness. The Digimon of light won after many sacrifices and brought an era of peace, but the forces of darkness are rising again and Tai and the other children were chosen to stop them, not only to save the Digital World, but the Human World as well. The children are instructed to look for the Holy Digimon at the Cloud Continent before their conversation is interrupted by an army of Dokugumon led by Ogremon. With Birdramon's help, they escape the ambush. Meanwhile, the Whamon transporting Izzy and Tentomon is attacked by a horde of Tylomon. Leaving Whamon's mouth with Tentomon's help, Izzy concludes that the Tylomon are being controlled by a nearby Soundbirdmon and, determined to protect his friend, Tentomon digivolves into Kabuterimon to destroy the Soundbirdmon and free the Tylomon from its control.
6	"The Targeted Kingdom" (The Targeted Kingdom); Transliteration: "Nerawareta Ōkoku" (Japanese: 狙われた王国)	Yō★Nakano	Hiroshi Yamaguchi	July 12, 2020	April 13, 2023
On their way to the ocean, Tai's group is captured by a Palmon who mistakes them for fruit thieves and brings them to Mimi Tachikawa, the self-proclaimed queen of a village of Tanemon. She reveals that the Tanemon are threatened by a pack of Tuskmon who have been stealing their fruits and Tai agrees to help. Izzy contacts them and reveals that time in the Digital World flows much faster than in the Human World, giving them more time to stop the outages in Tokyo than they at first believed. Meanwhile, Ogremon brings the Tuskmon under his control and sends them to attack the village. Tai and Sora confront the invaders while Mimi and Palmon defend themselves against Ogremon, who makes a surprise attack riding a Drimogemon. Palmon is badly hurt while protecting Mimi, whose resolve to stay by Palmon's side causes her to digivolve into Togemon. Togemon defeats the Drimogemon while Greymon breaks one of Ogremon's horns, driving him away. Afterwards, Mimi and Palmon bid farewell to the Tanemon and join the others on their journey. Elsewhere, Ogremon is angry at his defeat.
7	"That Boy is Joe Kido" (That Boy is Joe Kido); Transliteration: "Sono Otoko, Kido Jō" (Japanese: その男、城戸丈)	Matsuda Tetsuaki	Kenji Konuta	July 19, 2020	April 13, 2023
The children finally reach the ocean and take a moment to relax. Birdramon flies Tai, Sora and Agumon to scout the sea but they are knocked out of the sky by a Gesomon lurking beneath the waves. The group is rescued and brought back to shore by Gomamon, an aquatic Digimon who reveals that he is the partner of Joe Kido, another DigiDestined. The group attempts to convince Joe to join them on their quest but he refuses, being more worried about middle school entrance exams than saving the world. Joe tells Gomamon to join Tai's group while he stays behind to study and wait for help. Tai and the others form a plan to lure Gesomon to shore using Gomamon as bait. The plan succeeds but Gomamon is injured, and as Gesomon holds its own against Greymon and Togemon, Joe realizes that Gomamon has always been there for him during his time in the Digital World, triggering Gomamon's digivolution into Ikkakumon. Together, the three Digimon defeat Gesomon and the children ride Ikkakumon to their next destination.
8	"The Children's Attack on the Fortress" (The Children's Attack on the Fortress); Transliteration: "Kodomotachi no Kōjōsen" (Japanese: 子供たちの攻城戦)	Yōko Furuya; Yūichi Tsuzuki	Toshiaki Satō	July 26, 2020	April 13, 2023
Riding on Ikkakumon's back, the children arrive at the other side of the ocean, when they are attacked from afar. They are rescued by Matt and his partner Gabumon, who reveals that there is a Gorimon sniping at them from atop a fortress. Certain that the others will only hinder him, Matt leaves them behind and launches an attack on the fortress alone, with Gabumon digivolves into Garurumon, until a desperate Joe calls for surrender, but fails. This gives Tai and Sora an idea for them to act as decoys for Matt, who takes the opportunity to defeat Gorimon. After all other enemies are defeated, Matt apologizes to the others for not relying on them, and while exploring the fortress, the group finds a stone tablet which Tai affirms to contain information regarding the Holy Digimon.
9	"The Ultimate Digimon Attacks" (The Ultimate Digimon Attacks); Transliteration: "Kanzen-tai Shūrai" (Japanese: 完全体・襲来)	Kenji Setō	Masashi Sogo	August 2, 2020	April 13, 2023
On a cliff, Ogremon receives new orders from his master, Devimon, who warns him not to fail his mission of destroying the children and that he would send Ogremon aid this time around. Meanwhile, back at the fortress, Tai learns from the tablet that the Holy Digimon was captured by the enemy. While the children discuss what to do next, Ogremon arrives and challenges Tai and Agumon for a rematch. During their fight, a pack of Coredramon (controlled by a Soundbirdmon) arrive to attack the other children, until Izzy and Kabuterimon arrive to reunite with the others and Ogremon eliminates half of a pack of coredramon personally and the survivors retreat, wanting a fair fight. Ogremon and Greymon have a fierce duel until a MetalTyrannomon, the 'aid' sent by Devimon, arrives to attack and swiftly defeats both combatants. Feeling himself betrayed and dishonored, Ogremon points out the location of the Holy Digimon to the children, instructing them to escape while he fights MetalTyrannomon alone, sacrificing himself.
10	"The Steel-Solid Super Digivolution (Note: As announced vocally in the teaser at the end of episode 9.)" (The Steel-Solid Super Evolution); Transliteration: "Kōtetsu no Chōshinka" (Japanese: 鋼鉄の超進化)	Hideki Hiroshima	Atsuhiro Tomioka	August 9, 2020	April 13, 2023
With MetalTyrannomon pursuing them, the children take shelter on a cave where Izzy, analyzing the data he obtained at the fortress, pinpoints the location where the Holy Digimon is being held based on Ogremon's directions. After Tai and Matt had a minor disagreement over whether to trust Ogremon's last words, Tai and Agumon decides to stay behind and distract the enemy while the others make their escape, with Izzy also giving Tai some info on MetalTyrannomon's attack patterns. The escape plan fails when the children's advance is cut short by a lake of miasma that blocks their way just as Tai and Greymon's fight against MetalTyrannomon brings the combatants to their location. Despite being at disadvantage, Tai and Greymon refused to give up, with Tai's Digivice reacting to his courage and causing Greymon to digivolve into MetalGreymon who then defeats MetalTyrannomon. Unable to proceed forward due to the miasma, the children decide to circle around the lake while split into two groups, hoping that at least one of them can find a way past it.
11	"The Wolf Standing Atop the Desert" (The Wolf Standing Atop the Desert); Transliteration: "Sabaku ni Tatsu Ōkami" (Japanese: 砂漠に立つ狼)	Kimiharu Mutō	Atsuhiro Tomioka	August 16, 2020	April 13, 2023
Separated from the others, Tai, Izzy and Mimi find some forest ruins and decide to investigate it. Meanwhile, Matt, Sora and Joe are ambushed at the desert by some SandYanmamon when a Scorpiomon appears and attacks both sides. The three escape to a cave, taking some Kyaromon they rescued to Neemon, who is leading a group of refugees in search for Leomon, who is leading the fight against the Digimon possessed by the miasma. Matt affirms that the children already have their own task at hand and refuses to offer help, but Joe and Sora decide to assist them. While Matt leaves alone, the others cross the desert together until the Scorpiomon and more SandYanmamon appear and attack them. Matt, realizing that he needs to trust his companions, returns to defend them, with Garurumon eventually digivolving into WereGarurumon who easily destroys Scorpiomon. After leading the refugees to safety, the children continue their journey together. Back to the ruins, Mimi triggers a trap and falls into a hole with Palmon, much to the others' shock.
12	"Lillymon Blooms" (Lilimon Blooms); Transliteration: "Ririmon Kaika" (Japanese: リリモン開花)	Nozomu Shishido	Hiroshi Yamaguchi	August 23, 2020	April 13, 2023
Tai and Izzy try to locate Mimi and Palmon after the two fell into the depths of the ruins. Meanwhile, Mimi and Palmon wandered about the ruins, eventually coming across a deactivated Guardromon among piles of robotic Digimon parts whom Mimi express sympathy towards. A Soundbirdmon that had been stealthily following them brainwashes an Andromon into attacking Mimi, but Guardromon suddenly reactivated by itself and helped them escape. Mimi and Palmon bonds with Guardromon, who eventually reunites them with the others, but Andromon catches up, easily defeating the other Digimons while matching MetalGreymon's power with its own until the heavily damaged Guardromon sacrifices itself to hold back Andromon. Mimi's grief causes Togemon to digivolve into Lillymon and defeat Andromon, who regained his senses before he and Guardromon's body are enveloped in vegetation caused by Lillymon's attack. After learning that Guardromon and Andromon were former comrades until the latter was brainwashed, Mimi leaves the flower Guardromon had given her as a memorial for the two Digimon before leaving the ruins.
13	"Garudamon of the Crimson Wings" (Garudamon of the Crimson Wings); Transliteration: "Guren no Tsubasa Garudamon" (Japanese: 紅蓮の翼ガルダモン)	Matsuda Tetsuaki	Ken'ichi Yamashita	August 30, 2020	April 13, 2023
Matt's group continue their journey with Birdramon flying them over a jungle when they encounter a swarm of Funbeemon fleeing from an army of Waspmon being led by the fortress-like CannonBeemon before being attacked themselves. In the process, Sora and Matt learns from an escaped Funbeemon that the Waspmon are capturing them to serve as CannonBeemon's army while Joe and Gomamon, separated from the others, gets captured. Sora and Matt managed to infiltrate CannonBeemon's insides to rescue Joe and Gomamon, but the children are forced to escape before they could free the rest of the Funbeemon. Sora and Birdramon then tried to go back and rescue them on their own, but the boys quickly caught on to her plan and began assisting her. Sora's compassion for the others triggers Birdramon's digivolution into Garudamon who then destroys CannonBeemon. As Matt's group part ways with the grateful Funbeemon, Tai's group comes across a maze-like canyon...
14	"The Kings of the Insects Clash" (The Kings of the Insects Clash); Transliteration: "Gekitotsu Konchū no Ōja" (Japanese: 激突 昆虫の王者)	Ryūta Yamamoto	Masashi Sogo	September 6, 2020	April 13, 2023
Tai's group is attacked by a swarm of Kuwagamon led by an Okuwamon as they travel through the canyon, their speed and coordination overwhelming the children's Digimon. Izzy, who had been using his tablet to analyze the enemies they encounter for weaknesses ever since their arrival to the Digital World, becomes distraught as it shuts down at a critical moment. As he and Kabuterimon are separated from the others, the two are cornered by Okuwamon. Sensing his partner's growing self-doubt, Kabuterimon helps Izzy to realize that his over-reliance on his tablet has been stopping him from using his natural intelligence. Regaining his confidence, Izzy causes Kabuterimon to digivolve into MegaKabuterimon. Following Izzy's strategy using the reflective stones scattered around the canyon to disorient the Kuwagamon, MetalGreymon is able to destroy them while MegaKabuterimon destroys Okuwamon. After the battle, Izzy's tablet starts working once again.
15	"Zudomon's Iron Hammer of Lightning" (Zudomon's Iron Hammer of Lightning); Transliteration: "Zudomon Inazuma no Tettsui" (Japanese: ズドモン 稲妻の鉄槌)	Kenji Setō	Toshiaki Satō	September 13, 2020	April 13, 2023
Matt's group arrives on a snowy mountain where they stopped for a rest, during which Matt and Sora make arrangements on how to proceed. Joe, feeling left out, is cheered up by Gomamon. Mammothmon ambushes them, accompanied by several Frigimon. During the escape, Sora is partially frozen by an attack from a Frigimon. A reluctant Joe agrees to draw the enemy away while Matt gets Sora to safety. Finding themselves standing in between their pursuers and the others, a panicked Joe is reminded by Ikkakumon of Sora's predicament, prompting Joe to tell Matt to stay with Sora when asked if he need help. Joe's new-found determination to protect his friends no matter what triggers Ikkakumon's digivolution into Zudomon who defeats Mammothmon and the Frigimon. Once reunited and with Sora having recovered, the group departs on Birdramon again. Meanwhile, Tai's group travels through a cave only to find themselves in Tokyo, Japan.
16	"The Jet-Black Shadow Invades Tokyo" (The Jet-Black Shadow Invades Tokyo); Transliteration: "Tōkyō Shinshoku Shikkoku no Kage" (Japanese: 東京侵食 漆黒の影)	Hideki Hiroshima	Kenji Konuta	September 20, 2020	April 13, 2023
Tai's group arrives in Tokyo and notice that despite the previous problems everything seemed normal. While traveling by subway, Mimi and Palmon leave the group to grab a meal, while Tai and the rest would return to their homes. However, during this time, both groups notice numerous strange irregularities. Upon reuniting, they realize that they are still in the Digital World as this version of Tokyo is a simulation of computer data created by Eyesmon, and the real Tokyo is still in danger and the Eyesmon are responsible for the power failure. In the ensuing battle, the Eyesmon combine into a single form and use their ability to create objects from data to overwhelm MetalGreymon, MegaKabuterimon and Lillymon. Once Matt's group shows up, all six Ultimate Digimon combine their power to defeat Eyesmon. However, Izzy learns that the time of their and the digital worlds have synchronized, as Tokyo is already in its third day of the blackout, just as Eyesmon digivolves into Orochimon.
17	"The Battle in Tokyo Against Orochimon" (The Battle in Tokyo Against Orochimon); Transliteration: "Tōkyō Kessen Orochimon" (Japanese: 東京決戦 オロチモン)	Kimiharu Mutō	Hiroshi Yamaguchi	September 27, 2020	April 13, 2023
Too exhausted to continue the fight, the children and their Digimon retreat. Separated from the others, Tai hears from Matt that his younger brother T.K. Takaishi lives in Shibuya and they must defeat the enemy to ensure his safety. Meanwhile in the real world, Kari gets separated from her mother amidst the confusion. After getting some rest, Tai and Matt launch another attack, soon joined by the others. The other Digimon distract the enemy's other heads until MetalGreymon deals a fatal blow on Orochimon's main head. With Orochimon defeated, the children are certain that Tokyo will be soon back to normal when a 10 minute countdown suddenly appears on several monitors not only before them, but also in the real world.
18	"Countdown to Tokyo's Annihilation" (Countdown to Tokyo's Annihilation); Transliteration: "Tōkyō Shōmetsu Kauntodaun" (Japanese: 東京消滅 カウントダウン)	Yukio Kaizawa	Atsuhiro Tomioka	October 4, 2020	April 13, 2023
As the countdown runs, a massive surge of energy descends from the real world, reviving Orochimon, who digivolves into Nidhoggmon. Izzy concludes that Nidhoggmon was the one responsible for the blackouts in Tokyo, absorbing the city's energy and fears that when the countdown reaches zero, all of the accumulated energy will be liberated, destroying it. Despite being exhausted from the last fight, Tai and Matt confront the enemy by themselves until feathers fall to the sky for T.K. and Kari, and both Greymon and Garurumon merge into Omnimon once more. Omnimon destroys Nidhoggmon along with the digital Tokyo, stopping the countdown and restoring power to the real one. Kari reunites with her mother when suddenly the countdown resumes due to Nidhoggmon's master's intervention. When it reaches zero, a portal opens and carries the group away, except for Tai and Matt who are protected by Omnimon. After the portal closes, the two are briefly confronted by Devimon, who makes contact with them from a distance and the two decide to look for the others.
19	"Fist of the Beast King" (Howl, Jyuoken); Transliteration: "Hoe yo Jūōken" (Japanese: 吠えよ獣王拳)	Michihiro Satō	Masashi Sogo	October 11, 2020	April 13, 2023
Tai and Matt are contacted by Izzy, who informs them that he and the other children returned safely to the real world, but that their Digimon are missing. The two then decide to keep searching for the Holy Digimon when they come across a Valvemon. Dozens of soldiers emerge from the Valvemon and attack the children, who are rescued by Leomon and his companions. Leomon reveals to Tai and Matt that they are fighting Devimon's forces and that there is some important cargo being kept inside Valvemon that is related to the Holy Digimon. The three then join forces to invade Valvemon and retrieve the cargo, but Minotarumon and Bullmon stand in their way. Greymon and Garurumon defeat the Bullmon together while Leomon defeats Minotarumon in a duel. After the battle, Tai and the others check on the container that was in the enemy's possession and discover T.K. inside, much to Matt's surprise.
20	"The Seventh One Awakens" (The Seventh One Awakens); Transliteration: "Shichininme no Kakusei" (Japanese: 七人目の覚醒)	Ryō Nanba	Ken'ichi Yamashita; Atsuhiro Tomioka	October 18, 2020	April 13, 2023
A Velgrmon appears and kidnaps T.K.. Tai and the others escape from inside Valvemon, who is completely destroyed by Velgrmon. As the Velgrmon escapes with T.K., a Megadramon appears to cover for its retreat and Leomon confronts the Megadramon alone, allowing Tai and Matt to chase after Velgrmon. Meanwhile, in the real world, Izzy and Sora make contact with their Digimon partners and learn that they escaped safely to the Network. In a combined effort, MetalGreymon and WereGarurumon stop Velgrmon while Matt rescues T.K.. However, Velgrmon fights back and attempts to capture T.K. again when Angemon, who was restrained somewhere, breaks free and rushes to T.K.'s aid. In the occasion, a Digivice appears for T.K., and Angemon uses his powers to heal and empower MetalGreymon and WereGarurumon, who defeat Velgrmon. Exhausted, Angemon reverts to a Digi-Egg and is stolen by SkullKnightmon.
21	"The Tide-Turning Update" (The Tide-Turning Update); Transliteration: "Gyakuten no Appudēto" (Japanese: 逆転の武装鋼化)	Kenji Setō	Toshiaki Satō	October 25, 2020	April 13, 2023
Tai and the others chase after SkullKnightmon but they are stopped on their tracks by Splashmon. Matt then sends T.K. into hiding and joins Tai against the Splashmon. Meanwhile at the real world, Izzy and the others are informed by their Digimon partners that a Calmaramon is commanding a horde of Algomon who are hacking into a large cargo ship's systems near Singapore, intending to ram it into the city. While hiding from danger, T.K. descends into a hole where he comes across a massive Digimon called Eldoradimon trapped inside an energy cage. The Splashmon drags a wounded MetalGreymon into the miasma with a desperate Tai attempting to set him free until his Digivice shines and transforms MetalGreymon into MetalGreymon Alterous Mode who makes use of the energy cannon on its right arm to destroy Splashmon. Using his Digivice, T.K. breaks Eldoradimon free, who in return allows the children to enter inside of him to look for Angemon's Digi-Egg.
22	"The Unbeatable Blue Sagittarius" (The Unbeatable Blue Sagittarius); Transliteration: "Fukutsu no Aoki Sajitariusu" (Japanese: 不屈の蒼き機翼)	Hideki Hiroshima	Kenji Konuta	November 1, 2020	April 13, 2023
Tai, Matt and T.K. fight their way inside Eldoradimon in search for the Digi-Egg and catch up to SkullKnightmon. While Tai and Matt fight the enemy, T.K. rushes to rescue the egg before it is corrupted by Devimon's power. Devimon uses Moon=Millenniummon's energy to digivolve SkullKnightmon into AxeKnightmon who overpowers MetalGreymon and WereGarurumon. Meanwhile, the rest of the children send their power to digivolve their Digimon so that they can fight Calmaramon and her forces. Matt comes to help his younger brother secure the egg and just when WereGarurumon is about to be defeated, Matt's Digivice shines, transforming him into WereGarurumon Sagittarius Mode, who overpowers AxeKnightmon. The egg hatches into a Poyomon, that T.K. takes in and refusing to let the children escape, Devimon appears before them.
23	"The Messenger of Darkness, Devimon" (The Messenger of Darkness, Devimon); Transliteration: "Yami no Shisha Debimon" (Japanese: 闇の使者デビモン)	Kimiharu Mutō	Hiroshi Yamaguchi	November 8, 2020	April 13, 2023
By controlling the miasma around him, Devimon overpowers MetalGreymon and WereGarurumon. Meanwhile at the real world, Izzy deduces that Calmaramon is sending massive amounts of data to the Digital World and that Tai's group must be in trouble. T.K. steps in and confronts Devimon, with Poyomon digivolving into Tokomon and purifying the miasma. In response, Devimon makes use of the data sent to him to digivolve into NeoDevimon. Despite being in a disadvantage in both fronts, the children refuse to give up and Izzy's group digivolve their Digimon to the Ultimate level, defeating Calmaramon and stopping the tankers from damaging the city. Without his data supply, NeoDevimon is distracted by WereGarurumon Sagittarius Mode and finally destroyed by MetalGreymon. From the castle remains, AxeKnightmon retrieves Moon=Millenniummon, who had been powering up NeoDevimon, and uses it to restore the enemy while making it digivolve further.
24	"The Final Stage, Dandevimon" (The Final Stage, DoneDevimon); Transliteration: "Shūkyoku DanDebimon" (Japanese: 終極 ダンデビモン)	Nozomu Shishido	Masashi Sogo	November 15, 2020	April 13, 2023
NeoDevimon digivolves into Dandevimon and attacks Tai and the others. Meanwhile, although Calmaramon was defeated, the Algomon keep multiplying despite MegaKabuterimon and his team's efforts to stop them while causing naval accidents across the world. When both Tai and Matt are about to be struck by Dandevimon's miasma, Tai pushes Matt away to protect him, with he and MetalGreymon taking serious damage. Matt and WereGarurumon step in to protect them, but are also defeated. When Dandevimon attempts to attack T.K. and Tokomon, both Tai and MetalGreymon are corrupted by the miasma and attack the enemy furiously, which ends with Tai being swallowed by him. Overcome by rage, MetalGreymon forcibly digivolves into Machinedramon, who attacks Dandevimon mindlessly. To calm down Agumon, Tokomon and T.K. use their holy powers to reach him, and by learning that Tai is still alive, Agumon briefly digivolves into WarGreymon, destroying Dandevimon and rescuing his partner. After the battle, Tokomon digivolves into Patamon, but when the group seems out of danger, an earthquake begins.
25	"Dive to the Next Ocean" (Dive to the Next Ocean); Transliteration: "Daibu Tsuginaru Umi e" (Japanese: ダイブ 次なる海へ)	Michihiro Satō	Masashi Sogo	November 22, 2020	April 13, 2023
The earthquake causes Eldoradimon, where Tai and his friends were fighting Devimon, to fall from the Cloud Continent into the ocean below. During their fall, Eldoradimon is attacked by thousands of Mamemon and BigMamemon and the children are rescued by Leomon and his companions. Meanwhile at the real world, tensions are rising between countries due to the naval accidents and Izzy's group learn from their Digimon that a massive horde of Zurumon are causing the problem. While they think of a way to deal with it, Kari approaches them. To save Eldoradimon from the fall, the children with Leomon's help execute a successful plan to use the BigMamemon to soften its landing. Back to the real world, Izzy devises a plan to stop the disturbance caused by the Zurumon.
26	"Break Through the Sea Monster Barricade" (Break Through the Sea Monster Barricade); Transliteration: "Toppa Kaijū Hōimō" (Japanese: 突破 海獣包囲網)	Mana Uchiyama	Toshiaki Satō	November 29, 2020	April 13, 2023
Tai and the others cross the sea on Eldoradimon's back when they come across a Seadramon fighting an Ebidramon. The Seadramon defeats and devours the Ebidramon, digivolving into WaruSeadramon and starts to attack them, later joined by a MegaSeadramon. The two enemies drag Tai and Greymon into the water, where they are forced to fight in disadvantage. Meanwhile at the Real World, Izzy taps into the GMDSS network to send a relay signal across the world which stops the ships from colliding. Running out of data to absorb, the Zurumon scatter. Certain that Tai and Matt are in trouble, the others wonder about how they could return to the Digital World, when Kari claims to being called right before a mysterious light engulfs them all. Tai and Greymon defeat both the WaruSeadramon and the MegaSeadramon, but are surrounded by more Seadramon-like enemies with Agumon too exhausted, until Izzy's group arrives to help defeat them. Now safe from peril and with the situation at the Real World resolved, the children rejoice upon their reunion, when Tai learns much to his surprise that Kari came to the Digital World with the others.
27	"To the New Continent" (To the New Continent); Transliteration: "Shintairiku e" (Japanese: 新大陸へ)	Kenji Setō	Atsuhiro Tomioka	December 6, 2020	April 13, 2023
As the children wonder how Kari came to the Digital World with them, they learn that the Zurumon keep causing trouble on the Real World. Just as they are about to reach the continent, Eldoradimon is hit by a storm, and Leomon's group stays behind to protect him while the children fight an army of Tortamon to land safely. A Groundramon appears and starts eating the Tortamon to accumulate energy on his back and starts attacking the children's Digimon. Despite digivolving their Digimon to the Ultimate Level, they fail to break through the enemy's defenses until MetalGreymon uses the Alterous Cannon to open up its mouth wide open, and all six Digimon fire together to destroy Groundramon from the inside. Exhausted from the battle, the children are surprised when AxeKnightmon appears to fight them, and as they are helpless and to be able to defend their friends, Patamon digivolves into Angemon.
28	"The Children's Fight for Survival" (The Children's Fight for Survival); Transliteration: "Kodomotachi no Sabaibaru" (Japanese: 子供たちのサバイバル)	Noriyo Sasaki	Atsuhiro Tomioka	December 13, 2020	April 13, 2023
Angemon fights AxeKnightmon, who attempts to kidnap Kari, forcing it to revert back into SkullKnightmon, but the energy generated by their confrontation sends the children away, teleporting each of them with their Digimon to a different place. With their Digivices, they manage to communicate with each other, confirming that they are unharmed, but most of them being threatened by rogue Digimon. Tai, Agumon and Kari are attacked by a Volcdramon. MetalGreymon fights the enemy to no avail until both Tai and Kari send more energy to him, which digivolves him briefly into WarGreymon once more to defeat it. After the battle and to Tai's surprise, SkullKnightmon appears and takes Kari away with her.
29	"Escape the Burning Jungle" (Escape the Burning Jungle); Transliteration: "Dasshutsu Moeru Mitsurin" (Japanese: 脱出 燃える密林)	Kimiharu Mutō	Kenji Konuta	December 20, 2020	April 13, 2023
Tai is desperate with Kari kidnapped by SkullKnightmon, but the forest where they are is being burned by an army of Allomon and Megadramon and they are forced to escape, providing assistance to a pack of Digimon who is also running from the fires. To cover for the others' retreat, Tai and Greymon confront the enemy force until a Tankdramon who leads them appear. Greymon digivolves to MetalGreymon, but is at a disadvantage against the enemy until the other Digimon decide to fight back as well and Sora arrives with Garudamon to help them. Together, they defeat Tankdramon and his allies, but they have little to celebrate as another wave of enemy Digimon arrive to attack them.
30	"The Mega Digimon, WarGreymon" (The Mega Digimon, WarGreymon); Transliteration: "Kyūkyoku-tai WōGureimon" (Japanese: 究極体ウォーグレイモン)	Hideki Hiroshima	Hiroshi Yamaguchi	December 27, 2020	April 13, 2023
Far outnumbered, Tai decides to act as a decoy for the enemies while Sora takes the refugees to a safe hideout. Meanwhile, Izzy discovers another crisis in the making with several satellites en route of collision with the International Space Station. A Parrotmon appears and joins the rogue Digimon against MetalGreymon, defeating it after digivolving into Crossmon. Despite being in a disadvantage, Tai and Agumon refuse to give up and return to the fight, with MetalGreymon fully digivolving into WarGreymon, who easily destroys all enemies, including Crossmon.
31	"A New Darkness, Millenniummon" (A New Darkness, Millenniumon); Transliteration: "Arata na Yami Mireniamon" (Japanese: 新たな闇ミレニアモン)	Michihiro Satō	Atsuhiro Tomioka	January 10, 2021	April 13, 2023
After the battle, Lopmon approaches Tai and Sora, revealing that he is the reincarnation of Cherubimon, a Mega-level Digimon who fought and died in the ancient war against the forces of darkness whose memories were awoken by Agumon's digivolution into WarGreymon. An army of Bakemon appears and they are forced to flee. During their run, Lopmon shares his memories of the war with Tai and Sora, revealing that the dark energy sent from the Human World is resonating with the fragments of Milenniummon, a powerful evil Digimon they defeated in the Ancient War. Some of the Bakemon digivolve into MetalPhantomon and the children protect Lopmon while he prepares a way for them to escape. Meanwhile, Izzy deduces that the satellites and the ISS will converge into a huge mass of space debris that will fall on Tokyo, causing widespread destruction. One of the MetalPhantomon digivolve into Gokumon and Agumon digivolves into WarGreymon to defeat it, while Garudamon defeats the other MetalPhantomon. Lopmon finishes his summon, reviving a pack of Komondomon that they use to escape the forest. Before parting ways with the children, Lopmon confirms Tai's suspicions that there is another Holy Digimon who is missing and that its partner is Kari. The Komondomon then split up to look for other Digimon in need while their leader helps Tai and Sora search for their friends and Kari notices that Moon=Millenniummon is in the possession of SkullKnightmon.
32	"Soaring Hope" (Soaring Hope); Transliteration: "Ama Kakeru Kibō" (Japanese: 天駆ける希望)	Ryō Nanba	Masashi Sogo	January 17, 2021	April 13, 2023
T.K. and a weak Patamon are chased by a Fangmon when Tai and Sora arrive to rescue them and drive away the enemy. While sharing their current status, the children learn from Izzy that the incident involving the satellites and the ISS was leaked to the public and the resulting wave of rumors and misinformation across the internet is fueling the dark energy that is powering up the rogue Digimon. Soon after, the Fangmon return in larger numbers and accompanied by a Cerberumon. Agumon and Biyomon digivolve to the Ultimate level to fight them but are in a disadvantage. Sora ends up hurt by an enemy attack and despite being too weak to digivolve into Angemon, Patamon makes a stand with T.K. to protect her, when their bond makes Patamon digivolve to Pegasmon instead, who then helps MetalGreymon and Garudamon to defeat the enemies.
33	"The Kari of Dawn" (The Hikari of Dawn); Transliteration: "Yoake no Hikari" (Japanese: 夜明けのヒカリ)	Kenji Setō	Atsuhiro Tomioka	January 24, 2021	April 13, 2023
Taking Kari and Moon=Millenniummon with her, SkullKnightmon digivolves into AxeKnightmon and begins the ritual to revive Millenniummon. Tai, Sora and T.K. arrive at the ritual site to rescue Kari, but she lets herself be absorbed inside AxeKnightmon instead. Certain that Kari is waiting for him, Tai and the others keep fighting to save her. Inside AxeKnightmon, Kari finally reaches the source of the voice that was always calling for her and finds Gatomon's soul. Tai and WarGreymon disrupt the ritual and break into AxeKnightmon to rescue Kari. Upon being defeated, AxeKnightmon reverts into her true form as Gatomon who reveals herself to be the Holy Digimon that they are searching for. Meanwhile, Millenniummon's followers are sure that there will be another opportunity for them to bring back their master.
34	"Kari and Gatomon" (Hikari and Tailmon); Transliteration: "Hikari to Teirumon" (Japanese: ヒカリとテイルモン)	Ryūta Yamamoto	Atsuhiro Tomioka	January 31, 2021	April 13, 2023
Tai's group dive into the ocean on their way to FAGA, the location of Millenniummon's largest piece, to prevent his resurrection, only to be knocked off course by the ocean current and take shelter in an underwater city led by MarineAngemon. After spending the night in the city, the children are about to resume their journey when the city is attacked by Anomalocarimon and a group of Mantaraymon. While the other Digimon of the group fight alongside their human partners, Gatomon insists on fighting alone to protect Kari, until Kari convinces her that they must fight together and Kari gains her own Digivice, using it to power up Gatomon who leads the others to defeat the invaders. After saving the city, the children depart to continue their quest to prevent Millenniummon's return.
35	"The Glowing Angewomon" (The Glowing Angewomon); Transliteration: "Kirameku Enjeūmon" (Japanese: 煌くエンジェウーモン)	Kimiharu Mutō	Kenji Konuta	February 7, 2021	April 13, 2023
Tai and his companions continue their underwater journey to FAGA when they are ambushed by a horde of Chikurimon led by an Ebidramon. Gatomon defeats most of the Chikurimon, but falters when the Ebidramon digivolves into Gusokumon. MetalGreymon defeats the Gusokumon and the children keep moving forward. Gatomon reveals to Kari that she feels uneasy with the idea of digivolving since she was transformed into SkullKnightmon by Millenniummon's influence, fearing that she will lose herself again. Soon after, a MarineDevimon appears and kidnaps Kari. Gatomon attempts to rescue her partner, only to turn on Greymon when corrupted by MarineDevimon's fragment of Millenniummon. But Kari calms Gatomon down while promising to always be by her side. Encouraged by Kari's words, Gatomon regains her courage and digivolves into Angewomon, destroying MarineDevimon and the Millenniummon fragment. After the battle, Izzy informs Tai that the ISS is about to fall on Tokyo and asks for his help to stop it.
36	"Operation Satellite Sniper" (Operation Satellite Sniper); Transliteration: "Eisei Sogeki Sakusen" (Japanese: 衛星狙撃作戦)	Mana Uchiyama	Masashi Sogo	February 14, 2021	April 13, 2023
Izzy reunites with Tai's group and they arrive at a pillar of light that connects to the network, intending to use it to fire at the Digimon controlling the ISS to alter its trajectory and prevent it from falling on Tokyo. As the city is being evacuated, the children and their Digimon fly to the top of the pillar but a horde of BladeKuwagamon led by a Metallife Kuwagamon attacks them. Sora, T.K. and Kari stay behind to fight the BladeKuwagamon but the Metallife Kuwagamon stops Tai and Izzy until Tai's Digivice reacts to the pillar's energy, digivolving MetalGreymon into BlitzGreymon, who defeats the Metallife Kuwagamon and gives an opening for Izzy and MegaKabuterimon to proceed and successfully make the ISS fall into Tokyo Bay without causing harm to the city.
37	"Mimi Wars" (Mimi-chan Wars); Transliteration: "Mimi-chan Wōzu" (Japanese: ミミちゃんウォーズ)	Michihiro Satō	Hiroshi Yamaguchi	February 21, 2021	April 13, 2023
While searching for food, Tai, Agumon, Sora and Biyomon fall into a river and the four of them are carried away by the current, eventually managing to get to shore and reunite with Mimi. The group finds a castle which Mimi explains is home to Gogmamon, a sovereign Digimon that enslaved the Gottsumon into mining for precious mineral stones. After explaining she has created a workforce together with some Gottsumon and a Golemon whom she and Palmon also saved from Gogmamon, Mimi wants to destroy the castle and liberate everyone working there. Divided into groups as part of Mimi's plan, the tyrant's subjects are all defeated, and encounter Gogmamon chewing some gems, which turn out to be his source of nourishment. Once Mimi notices he does not digest the diamonds, this allows Lillymon to use it to destroy him. In the end, Mimi makes the workers realize how important it is to have good companions as the rest of their group shows up.
38	"The Blazing Blue Friendship" (The Blazing Blue Friendship); Transliteration: "Moeru Aoki Yūjō" (Japanese: 燃える 蒼き友情)	Hideki Hiroshima	Toshiaki Satō	February 28, 2021	April 13, 2023
The evil Mephistomon is casting a mysterious spell that it decides to dedicate to Millenniummon as a worthy sacrifice, while Gabumon has been captured by the enemy. Matt, who has not yet been able to join Tai's group, begins to fight for Gabumon's rescue operation along with Joe and Gomamon. Gabumon is restrained at the top of a dangerous cliff and Matt decides to go up there to free his friend held hostage by Mephistomon. During the climb, the evil Digimon begins to subject the entire area to a powerful magic, separating Matt from Joe and Ikkakumon. However, Matt persists and manages to climb the top of the cliff but Mephistomon continues his ritual and a Salamandamon arrives to attack him. Although Matt is under attack, he still manages to reach Gabumon and remembers their first encounter, so the value of friendship awakens and Gabumon digivolves and defeats Mephistomon with WereGarurumon Sagittarius Mode. In the end, the four friends are reached by the rest of the group and reunite.
39	"Jagamon, Potato Trouble" (Jyagamon, Potato Hell); Transliteration: "Jagamon Poteto Jigoku" (Japanese: ジャガモン ポテト地獄)	Kenji Setō	Atsuhiro Tomioka	March 7, 2021	April 13, 2023
The children and their Digimon arrive at a rest area for traveling Digimon and come across a restaurant which is serving hamburgers offered for free by Burgermon. While they are relaxing, Joe points out to the rest of the group that the other Digimon customers don't eat fries which Gomamon explains they are likely hard for a Digimon to grab. A Potamon soon appears that loves to eat the fries and he quickly makes friends with Joe. At this point, Burgermon reveals that this is the last day which the fries will be served in his restaurant, causing Potamon to run away in tears. Potamon's negative emotions causes him to digivolve into Jyagamon, who then start attacking the whole surrounding area. Joe manages to recognize that Jyagamon is Potamon manages to purify Jyagamon by hitting him with Zudomon's hammer which is empowered by Angewomon's holy power. Jyagamon decides to redeem himself by collaborating with Burgamon to create new potato dishes. The children and their Digimon then head out to continue on their journey.
40	"Strike! The Killer Shot" (Strike! The Killer Shot); Transliteration: "Kimero! Hissatsu Shūto" (Japanese: 決めろ！必殺シュート)	Noriyo Sasaki	Masashi Sogo	March 21, 2021	April 13, 2023
When the group rests and spends some time relaxing and playing soccer, a floating island appears in the skies and some bombs start to rain that hit a part of the field where they are followed by a fruit. Together with Tai and Agumon, Sora and Birdramon fly to the island to look for more fruit. When they arrive, they notice that a Pomumon had been captured by some Flymon. After saving him, Pomumon explains that once this island was once peaceful until one day when the Flymon led by Toropiamon began to turn his friends into fruits and then devour them. During the battle, MetalGreymon and Tai end up inside a strange tree that turns them both into fruits. While Garudamon keeps Toropiamon busy, Pomumon and Sora go to save everyone. With Sora serving as a distraction, Pomumon frees his friends and they defeat Flymon together. After Tai and MetalGreymon are freed all the Digimon join forces to defeat Toropiamon. When peace returns, the Pomumons reward them by giving them many fruits, which they take and then return to the others.
41	"Mon-Mon Park in the Fog" (Mon-Mon Park in the Fog); Transliteration: "Kiri no Monmon Pāku" (Japanese: 霧のもんモンパーク)	Kimiharu Mutō	Hiroshi Yamaguchi	March 28, 2021	April 13, 2023
While looking for food their group, Matt and T.K. with their Digimon arrive at an amusement park Mon-Mon Park which causes the two brothers to recall having gone to one when they were younger with their parents. They have fun until they come across a Xiaomon who reveals the park is dangerous. That is when the park guide Opossummon reveals his true colors and during the battle the brothers are separated and Xiaomon is captured and fed to the park mascot Monzaemon, who then reveals his true form as WaruMonzaemon. Opossummon reveals that WaruMonzaemon is feeding off the energy from Xiaomon and his friends. Wanting to save them, T.K. and Pegasmon enter WaruMonzaemon and are captured with their life force being drained. While WereGarurumon and Matt are struggling against WaruMonzaemon, Matt's voice reminds everyone to not give up hope. The hope of T.K. and the trapped Digimon finally restores Patamon's ability to digivolve to Angemon who frees everybody and destroys the two evil Digimon. Afterwards, the two resume their search for food.
42	"King of Inventors, Garbagemon" (King of Inventors, Gerbemon); Transliteration: "Hatsumei Ō Gābemon" (Japanese: 発明王ガーベモン)	Ryūta Yamamoto	Masashi Sogo	April 4, 2021	April 13, 2023
Tai, Izzy and their Digimon explore an area when they find themselves in a junkyard run by Garbagemon and his assistant Chuumon, who were working on their invention. Garbagemon and Chuumon eventually notice them and, after a brief presentation, Garbagemon explains what they consider garbage he sees as a mountain of precious knowledge that confirms the existence of another world. At this point Garbagemon introduces himself as a local scholar who made the area his place of study after witnessing phenomenon of black lighting that brought trashcans to the area. Garbagemon decides to take the boys to his lab when he believes they may have information, the group soon attacked by a ravenous blob-like Digimon named Raremon. Agumon and Tentomon digivolve in Greymon and Kabuterimon to face Raremon but find their attacks ineffective, with Raremon only fleeing underground to feed. Once at the lab, boys are treated to tea as they explain to Garbagemon that the black lightning he witnessed was the manifestation of Millenniummon's rebirth. Then Izzy notices the presence of a wall full of cups in the laboratory with Garbagemon revealing they belonged to his other Chuumon assistants who Raremon devoured, explaining his intent to avenge them to Izzy as he shows him a bazooka he designed fire a freezing agent. With Raremon about to surface after having devoured a large amount of junk, Garbagemon decides to join forces with Tai and Izzy to defeat his historic nemesis. While Tai and Greymon hold off Raremon, the others transport Garbagemon's freeze machine to complete it while Garbagemon succeeds in freezing Raremon. However, the black lightnings reappear and make the freed Raremon digivolve into RareRaremon. MegaKabuterimon and MetalGreymon hold RareRaremon at bay until Izzy completes Garbagemon's freeze device, with MetalGreymon using it to fully solidify RareRaremon, making him a statue. Garbagemon thanks the boys for their help by giving them an old USB flash drive specifically, while Izzy tells him to continue his research for knowledge rather than revenge, with Chuumon digivolving into the insectoid Digimon Searchmon to better help Garbagemon.
43	"Clash, the King of Digimon" (Clash, the King of Digimon); Transliteration: "Gekitotsu Kingu obu Dejimon" (Japanese: 激突 キング・オブ・デジモン)	Ryō Nanba	Kenji Konuta	April 11, 2021	April 13, 2023
The journey to FAGA continues, Gatomon having some trouble remembering the way there upon noticing profound differences in the surrounding territory. While the USB drive that the group got from Garbagemon proves to be a solution to their dilemma, they and Komondomon are stopped in their tracks by a pair of perfect-level Digimon named Etemon and Volcanomon who are fighting over which of them is worthy of the title of King of Digimon. Izzy deduces the Digimons' musical attacks are disrupting digimon data from all over the area. Etemon and Volcanomon then notice the Chosen Children, deciding that the first one to destroy them wins their dispute. Agumon and Biyomon digivolve in Greymon and Birdramon, but are overpowered with not even MetalGreymon able to hit them. Etemon and Volcanomon express disappointment in fighting the Chosen Children, with Mimi convincing them not to use brute force to settle things. The decide to settle their dispute a rap race. The usual sound waves reappear, and Palmon, holding maracas, seems to begin to resist the enormous upheaval and digivolves into Ponchomon, a ghost-type whose Samba-based fighting style allows her to earn the King of Digimon, but Etemon and Volcanomon continue to reproach each other for failing to win the competition. In the end, the Chosen Children resume their journey on board Komondomon and while Izzy finally uploads the key data of a map that they can use to orient themselves along with Gatomon's memories to reach FAGA.
44	"Kari and the Moving Forest" (Hikari and the Moving Forest); Transliteration: "Hikari to Ugoku Mori" (Japanese: ヒカリと動く森)	Yūichi Tsuzuki	Natsumi Moriuchi	April 18, 2021	April 13, 2023
The Chosen Children continue their expedition and end up in a forest where they look for food, but Kari realizes that the place where they are seems to be somehow alive, shortly after everyone learns that they have ended up on board a humongous Digimon called Petaldramon. After noticing several deforest part of Petaldramon's body, Kari begins to wander into the forest with Gatomon and discovers a group of small insects that are infesting the forest, which attempt to attack both Kari and her Gatomon but are both protected by Petaldramon. The group then encounters a Muchomon and two Puwamons, who explain that their companions were devoured by those insect and an even bigger Digimon, which angered Petaldramon orced him to fight this nemesis several times to avenge them. Kari decides to help Petaldramon, who accepts by offering fruit to both the Chosen Children and their Digimon. By morning, the swarm and their leader Entmon, separates Petaldramon, Kari and Gatomon from the rest to engage with Petaldramon, resulting in a mortal blow. Through her compassion Kari and Angewomon reinvigorates the wounded Digimon and allow him to sacrifice himself to slay Entmon. At the end of the battle, all present see that both Petaldramon and Entmon's bodies have transformed into two statues made of grass but from that of the first they begin to bloom flowers that begin to fill the entire arid area, transforming it into a huge forest.
45	"Activate, MetalGarurumon" (Activate, MetalGarurumon); Transliteration: "Kidō MetaruGarurumon" (Japanese: 起動 メタルガルルモン)	Kenji Setō	Masashi Sogo	April 25, 2021	April 13, 2023
The Chosen Children arrive at a racetrack where a death race called the World Grand Prix Circuit is held. There they meet Machmon, the course's champion. Gabumon, impressed by Machmon's speed, challenges him to a race. During the race, Machmon goes berserk and Garurumon injures himself to prevent Machmon from crashing. Machmon apologizes, but Gabumon demands another race on the condition that they both race fairly. When Machmon attacks Garurumon again during the second race, Izzy discovers the problem: Machmon is being controlled by another Digimon called Parasimon. Long ago, Machmon let Parasimon take control of him so that he could keep his title. Ashamed over it, Machmon intends to commit suicide so as to not let Parasimon control anyone else ever again. Matt and WereGarurumon try to stop him, but Parasimon is too powerful. Upon hearing Matt's encouraging words to Machmon, WereGarurumon Mega-digivolves into MetalGarurumon. MetalGarurumon then freezes Parasimon solid with his Cocytus Breath, and then catches Machmon just as he goes over the cliff. Afterwards, Matt, Gabumon and Machmon finish the race together to the cheers of the rest of the Chosen Children and their partner Digimon.
46	"The Sword of Hope" (The Sword of Hope); Transliteration: "Kibō no Tsurugi" (Japanese: 希望の聖剣)	Kenta Nishi	Hiroshi Yamaguchi	May 2, 2021	April 13, 2023
Tai, Matt, Izzy and T.K. are captured by Millenniummon's servant Sephirotmon. Inside, the boys and their partner Digimon encounter replicas of their previously defeated foes, including Devimon, who accuses Angemon of being weak for allying himself with the Chosen Children. Angemon soon discovers that Devimon is actually a part of himself that splintered off into a separate being during his moment of despair in the event that took place at the end of the ancient war, after awakening from being nearly corrupted by a swamp of dark miasma. Outside, Gatomon surmises that Sephirotmon is gathering data to create a new body for Millenniummon. The remaining four kids try to fight Sephirotmon from the outside, but are shocked when the orb performs attacks used by their own allies. Back inside, Devimon gains the upper hand and nearly corrupts Angemon resulting in him nearly digivolving into NeoDevimon, however, T.K. gives Angemon the strength to break free from his wicked transformation, who in his turn then proceeds to absorb Devimon. Reunited with his "shadow", Angemon digivolves into MagnaAngemon and destroys the Sephirotmon orb with his Excalibur blade, freeing the others. When Devimon's lingering presence questions how long he would cling to hope, MagnaAngemon admits that he would find it out at the end of his journey together with T.K..
47	"The Villains of the Wastelands" (The Villains of the Wastelands); Transliteration: "Kōya no Akutōtachi" (Japanese: 荒野の悪党たち)	Mana Uchiyama	Toshiaki Satō	May 9, 2021	April 13, 2023
The group camps in a desert and during the night Joe and Gomamon seem to have disappeared into thin air and so Tai and Agumon start looking for them in the surrounding area, but they find a water tap and then meet a Digimon named Nohemon, the guardian of the water, which warns them that their friends have split up and have taken different paths. So Agumon and Tai have to split up in turn to look for them, but since the boy would be helpless without his partner, Nohemon decides to escort him. During the journey, Nohemon explains to his companion that his friends must have gotten into trouble looking for water and ended up in the clutches of two bands of Digimon that rule these wastes. Tai and Nohemon enter a lair and discover Gaossmon and his henchmen wanting to punish Joe, so they try to save him but are stopped by Tyranomon, Gaossmon's sworn brother. With a stratagem they manage to hit an internal water reserve that floods the entire cave and they take the opportunity to escape with Joe. Meanwhile Agumon has found Gomamon, ended up in another area where the boss is MiniDekachimon, who is protected by Atamadekachimon, and they too manage to find an escape route. The four friends manage to reunite but all the evil Digimon are on their heels, so Agumon and Gomamon digivolve into Greymon and Ikkakumon to battle the enemies. Crippled by Tyranomon during an earlier battle, Nohemon manages to defeat Tyranomon with Tai's help and Greymon sends Gaossmon and MiniDekachimon down Atamadekachimon's throat, defeating them. After being fished out by Tai and Agumon, Gaossmon and MiniDekachimon decide to redeem themselves and let everyone enjoy their water, after which Tai, Joe and their Digimon are joined by the rest of the group.
48	"The Attack of Machinedramon" (The Attack of Mugendramon); Transliteration: "Mugendoramon no Shūgeki" (Japanese: ムゲンドラモンの襲撃)	Hideki Hiroshima	Masashi Sogo	May 16, 2021	April 13, 2023
The DigiDestined have finally reached FAGA when Izzy gets a message from Leomon, who is situated inside ElDoradimon's castle with Lopmon and the other Digimon. The connection is interrupted by the Vademon, who issue a test of strength between the children and their strongest servant: the Ultimate Machine-type Digimon, Machinendramon. Matt and WereGarurumon instantly recognize Machinedramon as being similar to the form MetalGreymon took during the fight with DoneDevimon. The leader Vademon states that Machinedramon was created using the data collected from Millenniummon's servant Sephirotmon, so that Millenniummon could witness the children fight at their full power. Machinedramon gains the upper hand, knocking out Zudomon, MegaKabuterimon, Lillymon and Garudamon, while even withstanding attacks from WarGreymon and MetalGarurumon. Angewomon uses her holy powers to power up WarGreymon at the cost of her own power, resulting in her reverting to Gatomon. Tai tells the others that he and WarGreymon will stay and fight Machinedramon so that the others can escape in the meantime. WarGreymon manages to destroy Machinedramon, but Vademon force activates Machinedramon's final phase and switches its still-active power reactor into overload mode, sending both Tai and WarGreymon over to Cloud Continent with explosive force. The rest of the children helplessly watch, not knowing whether Tai and WarGreymon are still alive.
49	"The God of Evil Descends, Millenniummon" (The God of Evil Descends, Millenniumon); Transliteration: "Jashin Kōrin Mireniamon" (Japanese: 邪神降臨ミレニアモン)	Kimiharu Mutō	Masashi Sogo	May 23, 2021	April 13, 2023
While dealing with their aftermath with Machinedramon, Kari succumbs to despair over the uncertainty of her big brother and WarGreymon's survival, while Mimi tries her best to comfort her. But it turned out that Machinedramon's attack was meant to release Cloud Continent's sealed miasma, with Sephirotmon absorbing it to mutate into Chimairamon before merging with FAGA to form Millenniummon's body, with the Vademon consumed in the resulting explosion. Despite the completed resurrection of Millenniummon, the DigiDestined happily receive the return of Tai and WarGreymon.
50	"The End, the Ultimate Celestial Battle" (The End, the Ultimate Holy Battle); Transliteration: "Shūketsu Kyūkyoku no Seisen" (Japanese: 終結 究極の聖戦)	Takashi Ōtsuka	Kenji Konuta	May 30, 2021	April 13, 2023
Tai and Agumon have survived their encounter with Machinedramon, but the rest of the DigiDestined are trapped inside of a dimensional prison caused by Millenniummon. As WarGreymon tries to rescue their friends, the others digivolve, slowing down Millenniummon's efforts to crush them. Finally, WarGreymon succeeds and MagnaAngemon and Angewomon digivolve into their Mega forms of Goddramon and Holydramon who defeat Millenniummon. However, Millenniummon digivolves into ZeedMillenniummon who begins destroying the Digital World. Refusing to give up, Tai and WarGreymon attack ZeedMillenniummon with a Gaia Force which all of the Digimon that they have befriended empower with their hope. After Goddramon and Holydramon add their own powers, WarGreymon destroys ZeedMillenniummon once and for all and the DigiDestined rejoice in their victory.
51	"The Mystery Hidden Within the Crests" (The Mystery Hidden Within the Crests); Transliteration: "Monshō ni Kakusareta Nazo" (Japanese: 紋章に隠された謎)	Ryūta Yamamoto	Atsuhiro Tomioka	June 6, 2021	April 13, 2023
Following their last battle with Millenniummon, the DigiDestined receive a call from Garbagemon, who tells them that he has found a giant tree holding a secret base where they meet Wisemon. The DigiDestined then learn more about their upcoming new mission to acquire the secrets of their crests, while fending off a Burpmon seeking to devour the tree. They then proceed to feed Burpmon with the junk data scattered around, with their partner Digimon launching an all-out attack on their enemy blasting it to pieces, resulting in all of the data scattering around anew. As a result of the battle, Izzy decides to stay behind to help Garbagemon recover the rescattered data, whereas the others proceed on their journey to solve the mystery of their crests.
52	"Dance of the Heavens, Phoenixmon" (Dance of the Heavens, Hououmon); Transliteration: "Tenbu Hououmon" (Japanese: 天舞 ホウオウモン)	Noriyo Sasaki	Natsumi Moriuchi	June 13, 2021	April 13, 2023
Tai, Sora and their partner Digimon ride inside a pair of Mechanorimon when they suddenly wind up crashlanding on a volcanic island, where they meet Junkmon and his crew of other Digimon. Despite Junkmon's instincts telling him that the volcano is about to erupt, the other residents of the island are unwilling to abandon their place there since they like the island so much, therefore they are working hard to build and strengthen the walls to change the lava flow. Sora decides with Tai to join with Junkmon and his crew in their hard work. Junkmon tells them to always put safety first when working, and shortly they get into work. The volcano then suddenly starts erupting, spurting out volcanic rocks hitting the wall, causing the ladder and steelpipes to fall down on Biyomon when getting Sora out of harm's way in the process, leaving her left arm injured as a result. Concerned over Biyomon's safety, Sora attempts to keep Biyomon safe by telling her that she is fine on her own, which results in her hurting her partner's feelings. Hurt by Sora's doubts on her, Biyomon runs away crying. After being talked to by Junkmon, Sora then realizes that she needs to apologize to Biyomon just before the volcano starts erupting a second time, with Junkmon having the Digimon evacuated from the site before he takes Sora away from the dangerous place to safety. Elsewhere, Biyomon is hurrying to head off to where Sora is, and shortly after, they find each other through the thick smoke, with the two apologizing to one another before Biyomon digivolves to Birdramon and they both leave the area, taking Junkmon with them to where Tai and MetalGreymon are. Sora then decides with Birdramon to stop the lava from flowing down the island, and Birdramon super-digivolves to Garudamon in her attempt to block the lava flow with a giant stone block where the wall is broken open, but the lava is flowing over the stone block and swallowing Sora and Garudamon. Although being amidst the sea of lava, Sora's love and reforged trust for her partner enable Garudamon to Mega-digivolve to Phoenixmon, and then Sora and Phoenixmon both take off high into the sky and pull the lava up with them forming it into a mass of rope-looking shapes, and solidifying it into a pillar of crystal in the process, followed by Phoenixmon thanking Sora for having trust in her. After the situation settles down, Tai and Agumon are confused about which way they should go next. Junkmon proposes that they visit the hot springs with him for recuperation from their fatigue. As they might be able to find Kari and the others, Tai agrees to his proposal and they move on in their journey to the next destination.
53	"The Geko Hot Springs' Revolt" (The Geko Hot Springs' Revolt); Transliteration: "Geko Onsen no Ran" (Japanese: ゲコ温泉の乱)	Kenji Setō; Michihiro Satō	Toshiaki Satō	June 20, 2021	April 13, 2023
Upon reaching the mountains where the hot springs are located, in the search of the hot springs, an Armor-level Mutant-type Digimon named Kabukimon informs Joe, Kari, T.K. and their partner Digimon that the hot springs have all dried out, and he leads them to the mansion where his lord, ShogunGekomon, resides; in the heart of Shangri-La. However, Kabukimon is tricking them, as he has no intention of letting them go into the hot springs, which only ShogunGekomon is allowed to use, and it is soon revealed by Kabukimon that ShogunGekomon had destroyed all of the other hot springs and now has the only existing hot spring in his possession, and is using it as his own personal bath. He then grabs Gomamon with his tongue and proclaims him as his bride before blasting everyone else out of the mansion, far away into the snow with his Kobushi Tone. In the faraway distance, they meet up with Joe's former acquaintances; Blossomon and the Nanimon. Joe decides that he cannot turn a blind eye to them suffering, and then recklessly charges back into the mansion, but is blasted away by the Gekomon who are standing guard, however, he is saved by Junkmon and Agumon who arrive at the place in the nick of time and reunites with Tai. Now along with Tai, Junkmon, Blossomon and the Nanimon, Joe with help from Gatomon comes up with a new strategy: lure ShogunGekomon out of the mansion and into the fake hot spring. Soon after, Kabukimon informs ShogunGekomon of a new hot spring having emerged, and being enraged over the fact, he decides to go over there personally and destroy it himself. Gomamon personally hears from ShogunGekomon himself that he cannot stand the cold and that a cozy bath is the root of his power, and so he has to be carried over in a wooden tub full of hot spring water to keep himself warm and stable in the cold. ShogunGekomon then jumps into the fake hot spring only to realize that it is a trap set by Joe and his friends. Gomamon digivolves to Ikkakumon and fires off a Harpoon Vulcan into a bank of snow above, causing it to fall down into the fake hot spring and weakening ShogunGekomon. After ShogunGekomon and his servants were led to the fake hot spring, Kabukimon fights Tai and Greymon, however, he is easily defeated by MetalGreymon's Giga Destroyer, after Greymon having super-digivolved to MetalGreymon, and is sent flying into the fake hot spring, joining with his lord. The helpless and freezing Amphibian Digimon then pleads for mercy by offering half of his hot spring to Joe, but they are both responded with a Hammer Spark from Zudomon, having digivolved from Ikkakumon. Some time after, the hot springs are now restored, with everyone bathing and enjoying the warm water pools, including ShogunGekomon and Kabukimon, who both learned the important lesson about "sharing is caring", after being invited by Joe, who believes that hot springs should be available for everybody, and therefore, ShogunGekomon himself, Kabukimon and the rest of his servants now consider Joe to be their lord. Shortly after, Joe's Digivice starts lighting up.
54	"The Vagrant War Demon, Rebellimon" (The Vagrant War Demon, Rebellimon); Transliteration: "Sasurai no Senki Riberimon" (Japanese: さすらいの戦鬼リベリモン)	Nozomu Shishido	Masashi Sogo	June 27, 2021	April 13, 2023
Tai and Greymon are on Cloud Continent protecting a Cutemon from a marauding band of Giromon. Greymon digivolves into MetalGreymon when a hooded figure approaches them. Cutemon and the Giromon instantly recognize the figure as Rebellimon, a reckless Cyborg Digimon, who one by one defeats all but one the Giromon before attacking MetalGreymon. As they fight, MetalGreymon is reminded of Ogremon and their previous fight. Rebellimon leaves, but not before warning Cutemon to stay away from him. Later, Cutemon tells Tai and Agumon that this portion of the continent is a wasteland where strong outlaw Digimon would come to start turf wars and bully the weaker ones. Cutemon first met Rebellimon after he saved her from the Giromon, only for Rebellimon to call her a nuisance for being weak. Cutemon believes that Rebellimon has lost all sense of reason to fight... and to win, as she experienced when Rebellimon took on a Boltmon and ended up badly injured. The three then find Rebellimon fighting three Giromon riding on Boarmon. With the combined strength of Greymon and Rebellimon, they take out the Giromon and Boarmon. That night, Cutemon heals Agumon's wounds as Tai asks Rebellimon what his reason is for fighting. Rebellimon replies that he has no reason to fight, but Tai believes that he has someone whom he wants to protect. Agumon adds that he becomes super strong whenever he protects Tai. Suddenly, the same Boltmon that defeated Rebellimon shows up and attacks the group. Rebellimon charges in by himself, only to be brought down again with a single punch by Boltmon. Rebellimon looks back at the last time he was brought down to defeat and how Cutemon healed his wounds. Suddenly, Rebellimon gets up and saves Cutemon from being crushed under Boltmon's boot. Rebellimon questions why he saved Cutemon before remembering what Tai and Agumon said about protecting someone whom one cares about. Cutemon heals Rebellimon's left arm, followed by Rebellimon firing a Vanquish Missile at Boltmon. Boltmon blocks the missile with his right hand, but the blast causes him to be unable to grab his tomahawk and gets stuck in his chest before knocking it off of himself with another punch. The two Digimon then throw one last punch at each other, with Rebellimon's Maximum Demolisher destroying Boltmon as a result. Victorious, Rebellimon lets out a roar. The following morning, Tai asks Rebellimon what he will do next. Rebellimon replies that he will find another strong Digimon to fight against and asks Cutemon to come along with him. Tai and Agumon tell Cutemon that they are following wherever the Digivice takes them, and when they ask where Cutemon and Rebellimon are heading, Rebellimon simply replies: "Straight ahead..."
55	"The Digimon School Under Attack" (The Digimon School Under Attack); Transliteration: "Nerawareta Dejimon Gakkō" (Japanese: 狙われたデジモン学校)	Kenta Nishi	Hiroshi Yamaguchi	July 4, 2021	April 13, 2023
Mimi and Palmon end up in a forest and stumble upon a Digimon school run by Babamon and Jijimon. Here Babamon offers both of them to be able to enter his institute as long as they sign a document, the two agree but are forced to train like the rest of the Digimon. Then Mimi and Palmon try to rebel by fighting but are quickly defeated by Babamon, so they return to carry out grueling workouts. In the evening the two talk to Jijimon who explains to him that not long before one of their students had managed to get to the mega level but then became a delinquent, so Babamon tried to explain to him how to make good use of his powers but he left school, causing the instructor to become more rigid with her students. The next day Tai and Agumon also sign up but the calm is soon interrupted by the arrival of the former student BanchoMamemon and his henchmen, a group of Mamemon and three BigMamemon. The quartet immediately begins to cause havoc; BanchoMamemon clashes with Babamon as his henchmen battle Agumon who has digivolved into Greymon. Babamon begins to have the worst but Palmon intervenes and transforms himself to become Lillymon who offers him help in the fight. The efforts of the fairy seem not to be enough but Mimi does not lose heart and so Lillymon mega digivolves into Rosemon and turns the situation around. BanchoMamemon is defeated and regrets what he did, so he decides to re-sign up and learn from his mistakes. Eventually Babamon awards Palmon her diploma while Mimi finds confirmation that she obtained the Crest of Purity by looking at her Digivice.
56	"The Gold Wolf of the Crescent Moon" (The Gold Wolf of the Crescent Moon); Transliteration: "Mikazuki no Kinrō" (Japanese: 三日月の金狼)	Mana Uchiyama	Kenji Konuta	July 11, 2021	April 13, 2023
Matt and Gabumon camp in a forest and here the Digimon has a dream that makes him awaken slightly upset. A thick purple fog falls on the place, so the two, sensing the danger, start running but find themselves in front of Zanbamon, a Digimon looking like a samurai on horseback who wields two swords. Shortly afterwards, a Grizzmon and a Hanumon also arrive who attack Zanbamon but are both killed with extreme speed, the next designated victim is Storabimon, one of their companions who had been watching the scene, but Gabumon intervenes, digivolved into Garurumon who tries to save him. With any luck, the three manage to escape from their opponent's clutches and go to a safe area where they converse with a Mojyamon who appears to be one of the weaker Digimon protectors that inhabit that area. During the afternoon Gabumon continues to think about that strange dream and he feels like he has seen the Digimon samurai, so he and Matt offer to help the others defeat the threat. Evening falls and the two break into the forest, Garurumon super digivolves into WereGarurumon and launches the assault against Zanbamon but his attacks have no effect, but when he is about to have the worst Tai and MetalGreymon arrive who provide their support but also them they fail to defeat him. The two Digimon then pass to the mega level but even in this form they cannot do anything, so the next morning all four are found still alive by Storabimon and tell him what happened, he then explains to him that maybe they still had a chance and says to Matt and Gabumon to follow him. He leads them to the ruins of his village and shows them a naginata with which they could beat Zanbamon's fighting spirit, but does not believe it can actually work, Gabumon digivolved into Garurumon takes the weapon with him and says that he is ready to attempt this quest. Back in the forest, Garurumon super digivolves once again into WereGarurumon and fights using the naginata, but it breaks in two. One part is taken by Matt while the other by WereGarurumon and they try to defend themselves from Zanbamon's attack. The strong bond of friendship between the boy and the Digimon awakens the Crest of Friendship on Matt's Digivice and leads the latter to mega digivolve into a new form, CresGarurumon. Zanbamon, remembering the defeat at the hands of CresGarurumon, sets out to attack, but is ultimately defeated with extreme ease by the fighter in the golden armor.
57	"Contact from the Catastrophe" (Contact from the Catastrophe); Transliteration: "Hametsu Kara no Kontakuto" (Japanese: 破滅からの接触)	Kimiharu Mutō	Atsuhiro Tomioka	July 18, 2021	April 13, 2023
After receiving news from T.K. and Kari that Patamon and Gatomon have fully recovered, Tai and Agumon were taken into a pocket realm by a swarm of Baby-Level Algomon, the first Digimon they had faced in the course of this adventure. But the two are amazed that the Algomon are welcoming them as they digivolve into Champion-Level Algomon, with one further digivolving into a humanoid Ultimate-Level Algomon. Ultimate Algomon explains how his kind are a hive mind that have been executing the design of their creator before conducting an experiment by separating Tai from Agumon, with the latter surrounded by a crowd of ensnared Tai copies that Agumon must identity the real one among them while warned that the copies will explode when freed. Agumon nearly falls in depair over repeated failures before regaining his strength upon remembering Tai's courage, destroying all copies with the real Tai revealed to be bound to a nearby rock by an Adult-Level Algomon. After reuniting, Agumon gradually divolves to WarGreymon while wiping out pocket realm with only the Ultimate Algomon surviving the onslaught. Tai demands that Algomon reveal his creator's identity, but tells him that very soon his lord would put an end to everything before taking his leave, leading the boy to assume that it is the Great Catastrophe.
58	"Kari, New Life" (Hikari, New Life); Transliteration: "Hikari Arata na Inochi" (Japanese: ヒカリ 新たな命)	Hideki Hiroshima	Masashi Sogo	July 25, 2021	April 13, 2023
Kari, T.K. and their Digimon return to Petaldramon Forest and here they meet Muchomon and two Puwamon who want to show him something extraordinary. So they take them to a place where the Digitama are kept and cheerfully talk about the birth of the Digimon when Kari notices that one of the Digitama is not moving as it should and is cold. At this point Tai and Agumon arrive who greet them but Gatomon senses the presence of some threat thanks to her Holy Ring. Meanwhile, Kari tries to warm the egg with a scarf and Muchomon reveals that they had found it in the depths of the forest, so Gatomon asks him to lead the way. The group leaves for an expedition and penetrates into the dense vegetation and find other Digitama in the same condition as the other but are attacked by some Soulmon that Gatomon manages to put to flight. So Gatomon decides to get help from Komondomon to protect the eggs along with the support of the others, after which he leaves with Kari to investigate the ghost Digimon. The two go further and further until the Soulmon ambush them but are easily neutralized, however the real enemy is hidden in the shadows and is revealed to be SkullBaluchimon, a Digimon capable of controlling the ice that begins to bomb the area. Gatomon is forced to digivolve into Angewomon to face him; despite the best attacks of him the latter seems to have the worst but continues to not give up. In the course of the battle she ends up in the area where the other Digitama are kept and so she tries to defend them from both SkullBaluchimon and Soulmon, while Kari arrives to support her but once again the efforts seem to be completely in vain. Kari is also hit and the Digitama falls from her hands which hatches thanks to the power of the light of the child and from it a Nyokimon is born who manages to make her understand that she had managed to fulfill her mission. Kari stands up and the Crest of Light appears on her Digivice that she begins to emit a very powerful glow that gives new energy to Angewomon who briefly uses the power of Ofanimon and defeats SkullBaluchimon making him go back to being a Digitama. Eventually Kari and Gatomon meet Tai and Agumon to whom they show they managed to protect the Digitama.
59	"Bolt, HerculesKabuterimon" (Bolt, HerakleKabuterimon); Transliteration: "Denkō HerakuruKabuterimon" (Japanese: 電光ヘラクルカブテリモン)	Ryūta Yamamoto	Natsumi Moriuchi	August 1, 2021	April 13, 2023
Izzy (along with Tai) is challenged by Nanomon to a challenge of knowledge: solve three riddles and tag Nanomon in 30 minutes before a GranKuwagamon eats the Whamon that Izzy came to the Digital World upon. The group fails the first riddle when they take the lower chamber instead of the upper one, and as punishment, Nanomon captures Tai. Izzy solves the second riddle by choosing the right bridge and stomps three times while facing right. Upon failing the third riddle, Agumon is taken, and Izzy begins to question his genius. After some encouragement from Tentomon, Izzy presses forward. After Tentomon digivolves into Kabuterimon, Izzy arrives at the chasm where Whamon is held hostage. GranKuwagamon blocks their way, forcing Kabuterimon to super-digivolve into MegaKabuterimon in response. GranKuwagamon proves to be too powerful, but when Izzy sees his reflection on Whamon, he figures out where Nanomon is hiding. MegaKabuterimon then mega-digivolves into HerakleKabuterimon. Thanks to some edited footage to make it appear that Whamon is on fire, Nanomon is flushed out. HerakleKabuterimon takes out GranKuwagamon with a Giga Blaster, and Izzy wins the challenge by tagging Nanomon. Later, Izzy and Tai find out Nanomon is a research fellow of Garbagemon who was manipulated by the Soundbirdmon into attacking them as the Crest of Knowledge appears on Izzy's Digivice.
60	"Vikemon Ventures the Glaciers" (Vikemon Ventures the Glaciers); Transliteration: "Hyōga o Yuku Vaikumon" (Japanese: 氷河を征くヴァイクモン)	Yūichi Tsuzuki	Hiroshi Yamaguchi	August 8, 2021	April 13, 2023
Joe and his hot spring buddies head south for warmer waters after the hot springs dry up. They meet up with Mimi and her friends from the Digimon School on a Blimpmon. Suddenly, they are attacked by a pirate ship captained by Olegmon, who demands food in exchange for not attacking the ship. Mimi, acting for Joe, refuses and Olegmon opens fire on the unarmed Blimpmon. In the affray, Joe, Gomamon and ShogunGekomon are thrown off Blimpmon and are captured by Olegmon. After escaping, Joe and Gomamon learn from one of the starving crew mates that they are on this ship after their island home became uninhabitable. Joe challenges Olegmon to a battle, with the loser becoming the winner's servant. Olegmon agrees and the two face off on a nearby glacier. Joe starts by having Gomamon digivolves into Ikkakumon, who fires several Harpoon Vulcan shots at Olegmon to no effect. Ikkakumon then super-digivolves into Zudomon. The two engage in close-quarters combat, with Olegmon gaining the upper hand after his battle axes disarms Zudomon. After hearing that Joe is fighting for the same reason as Olegmon, Zudomon mega-digivolves into Vikemon. Vikemon's maces demolish Olegmon's axes, then brings the Ultimate-level Digimon down with an Arctic Blizzard attack. The group finally arrives at a warm beach followed by the Crest of Sincerity appearing on Joe's Digivice.
61	"A Place to Return To" (A Place to Return To); Transliteration: "Kaeritai Basho e" (Japanese: 帰りたい場所へ)	Kenji Setō	Toshiaki Satō	August 15, 2021	April 13, 2023
Tai and Agumon find an uncovered chain and see ElDoradimon's castle, so they decide to go there. Here they meet Leomon, T.K. and Patamon and the latter two explain that they want to help ElDoradimon get to the top of the mountain as they want to return home to Cloud Continent. After discussing what to do, all those present decide to lend a hand to the mighty Digimon to arrive at their destination, so Patamon and Agumon digivolve to Angemon and MetalGreymon respectively and provide their support, however the undertaking proves to be more than difficult. Despite the difficulties, the group does not give up and tries in every way to help their giant friend, even using ropes to pull him up. At one point, after claiming that he has nowhere to return to, Gravimon asks T.K. why he is so stubborn not to give up and the boy explains that there is still hope for ElDoradimon. Gravimon leaves and T.K. continues to direct the operation thanks to the help of everyone else, so in the end he manages to bring the Digimon to the top of the mountain but apparently this cannot support his weight and both ElDoradimon and T.K. begin to fall. Gravimon saves them thanks to his powers and reminds him not to give up, so Angemon digivolves into MagnaAngemon and combines his strength with that of Gravimon and together they manage to create wings for ElDoradimon for a short time to allow it to land safely onto Cloud Continent. The Crest of Hope appears on T.K.'s Digivice and Tai realizes that the compasses leading to the Crests may not be pointing to a location, but events.
62	"The Tears of Shakkoumon" (The Tears of Shakkoumon); Transliteration: "Shakkoumon no Namida" (Japanese: シャッコウモンの涙)	Noriyo Sasaki	Masashi Sogo	August 22, 2021	April 13, 2023
Tai and a hungry Agumon arrive at an agricultural farm where Sora, Biyomon, Junkmon and a few other Digimon are harvesting vegetables. They learn from Neemon that the land was once protected by a benevolent Digimon and plan to develop it into a town later on. When the group removes an old tree stump, they inadvertently awakened Shakkoumon, the Digimon that once protected the area, who proceeds to go on a rampage. Greymon and Birdramon respectively super digivolve into MetalGreymon and Garudamon in an attempt to stop it from attacking, but Shakkoumon suddenly stops by itself. Sora and Biyomon go inside the hole that Shakkoumon came out of and find ancient ruins. Upon touching a small statue of Shakkoumon, Sora and Biyomon are overwhelmed by visions from Shakkoumon's past and faint. Back on the surface, Shakkoumon reactivates and MetalGreymon mega digivolves into WarGreymon to prevent it from destroying anymore of the area. WarGreymon tries to use Gaia Force, but Garudamon blocks the attack. Sora tells Tai that they will stop Shakkoumon. Sora and Garudamon inform Shakkoumon that the battle is over and its current actions are disrespecting the memory of the Cupimon and Puttimon that gave their lives to protect him. Upon promising to restore Shakkoumon's role as a guardian deity, the Crest of Love appears on Sora's Digivice and Garudamon mega digivolves into Phoenixmon. Phoenixmon uses her Starlight Explosion, which causes Shakkoumon to break down in tears after seeing the spirits of the Cupimon and Puttimon.
63	"The Crest of Courage" (The Crest of Courage); Transliteration: "Yūki no Monshō" (Japanese: 勇気の紋章)	Masahiko Suzuki	Atsuhiro Tomioka	August 29, 2021	April 13, 2023
Tai, Agumon, Sora and Biyomon are led to a castle from the ancient war with Millenniummon where Tai is separated from the others and meets with the spirit of Valkyrimon who reveals that a great power exists that could stop the Great Catastrophe. To test if Tai is worthy of learning about this power, Valkyrimon sends him into a desolate forest where he rescues a Botamon that Tai has to protect from various enemy Digimon. Surrounded by three Allomon, Tai stays behind to hold them off while Botamon escapes, but his bravery causes the Crest of Courage to appear before Botamon who summons a manifestation of Greymon to destroy the Allomon, revealing Botamon to be a dedigivolved Agumon. With Tai having passed her test, Valkyrimon reveals that the great power that can stop the coming Great Catastrophe is the same power that had destroyed Millenniummon the first time: Omnimon whom the DigiDestined have already managed to summon to defeat Algomon and Nidhoggmon. Valkyrimon reveals that Seraphimon and Ofanimon caused the first DNA digivolution into Omnimon who only holds shape in any world it appears to as long as Tai, Agumon, Matt and Gabumon maintain their determination, resoluteness and courage to save the worlds, and multitude hearts of humans, Digimon, or any other living creatures keep praying and wishing for salvation. Valkyrimon assures Tai that if the DigiDestined keep this in mind, Omnimon's power could unlocked again to stop the Great Catastrophe. Tai awakens to discover that his experiences have been a vision and he is reunited with his friends before the Crest of Courage appears on Tai's Digivice.
64	"The Angels' Determination" (The Angels' Determination); Transliteration: "Tenshi-tachi no Ketsui" (Japanese: 天使たちの決意)	Hideki Hiroshima	Masashi Sogo	September 5, 2021	April 13, 2023
Devimon appears to T.K. and Patamon in a dream, warning them that the Great Catastrophe approaches which will suck everything into a white void which Devimon believes is impossible to stop. The two reunite with Kari and Gatomon who realizes that Devimon, who was studying pushing the limits of digivolution, was being pushed by a greater force and that Millenniummon was also a part of the Great Catastrophe. The DigiDestined receive a distress call from Garbagemon that Wisemon's Tree is being attacked by a huge swarm of Soundbirdmon and their brainwashed minions and they all rush to help fight them off. As the monoliths of the Crests begin reacting with the children, the Soundbirdmon suddenly fuse together into Ghoulmon, the King of the Army of Darkness from the ancient war who they realize is simply an omen for the Great Catastrophe. As Ghoulmon attacks, Wisemon finally understands that the answer to the mystery of the Crests is the actions that the DigiDestined have taken throughout their entire adventure and the qualities that they shared with those that they had encountered. The hope and light of all of the Digimon causes MagnaAngemon and Angewomon to digivolve into Seraphimon and Ofanimon who destroy Ghoulmon and with him, all of the Soundbirdmon. However, Ghoulmon's destruction also releases Negamon, the Digimon behind the Great Catastrophe. As the Crest monoliths suddenly fly away, a crack appears in the sky leading into a white void containing Negamon, causing T.K. and Patamon to remember Devimon's warning about this being the Great Catastrophe.
65	"The Great Catastrophe, Negamon" (The Great Catastrophe, Negamon); Transliteration: "Kyodai na Hametsu Negāmon" (Japanese: 巨大な破滅ネガーモン)	Mana Uchiyama	Masashi Sogo	September 12, 2021	April 13, 2023
With Negamon freed, it begins to suck the Digital World into a white void as the DigiDestined receive messages from their various Digimon friends about the unfolding of the Great Catastrophe. The children are then sucked into the void, their Digivices protecting them from dissolving as Ultimate Algomon appears. Algomon explains Negamon's purpose and how the Digital World's survival instinct summoned the children to oppose Negamon as it use the network data's to prep disaster, joined by like-minded Digimon. But after Izzy notes the chaotic nature of the network data corrupted Negamon into overriding its programming to destroy everything, Algo transitions into his Worm Phase and then his mega form to kill the children. At the same time, the partner Digimon attempt to get into the void with the help of Garbagemon, Wisemon, Searchmon and Komondomon, but they are blocked by several Adult Algomon. Eventually, Komondomon manages to fling the Digimon past the blockade and they rescue their partners, gradually digivolving while destroying the Algomon before destroying Mega Algomon. Algomon accepts his demises while revealing that the time has come for Negamon to destroy everything and Negamon begins attacking the human world as well.
66	"The Last Miracle, The Last Power" (The Last Miracle, The Last Power); Transliteration: "Saigo no Kiseki Saigo no Chikara" (Japanese: 最後の奇跡 最後の力)	Yūichi Tsuzuki	Hiroshi Yamaguchi	September 19, 2021	April 13, 2023
As both worlds fall into peril, the DigiDestined battle Negamon who digivolves into Negamon (Giant) that WarGreymon and MetalGarurumon destroy. But the Giant Negamon is a decoy as the real one digivolves into Abbadomon instead. Abbadomon turns Izzy, Mimi, Sora, Joe and their partners into ghostly forms, swallows Seraphimon and Ofanimon and proves to be more than a match for WarGreymon and MetalGarurumon. As everything seems lost, people from around the world send their hopes to the DigiDestined, restoring them, while Devimon and SkullKnightmon unexpectedly appear to save Seraphimon and Ofanimon. The Digimon channel the hopes of the entire world to WarGreymon and MetalGarurumon who fuse into Omnimon again. Omnimon, Tai and Matt break into the heart of Abbadomon to destroy the evil Digimon and end the Great Catastrophe once and for all.
67	"The End of the Adventure" (The End of the Adventure); Transliteration: "Bōken no Hate" (Japanese: 冒険の果て)	Nozomu Shishido	Atsuhiro Tomioka	September 26, 2021	April 13, 2023
As the other Digimon battle Abbadomon's orb, Omnimon faces its core body, but is nearly defeated. The DigiDestined's determination causes Omnimon to Mode Change into Omnimon Alter-S who proves to be more than a match for Abbadomon, finally destroying it and ending the Great Catastrophe. Abbadomon reformats into a Digi-Egg that vanishes while the children's Digivices restore the damage that was done to both worlds. The Digimon celebrate their world being saved and spread the legend of the DigiDestined. Back in the real world, the Digidestined are revealed be joined by their Digimon partners. Kari sneaks home with Gatomon, Sora goes on a run while being watched over by Biyomon, Joe returns to school with a hidden Gomamon helping him when he drops something, Mimi runs her own company with Palmon's help while Izzy works on creating a gateway between the two worlds with Tentomon's help and T.K. and Matt meet up, bringing with them the hidden Gabumon and Patamon. Tai chooses to remain in the Digital World to explore it with Agumon.
