= Saint Seiya Omega season 2 =

Season of television series

Saint Seiya Omega
- Season 2
- Cover of the first Saint Seiya Omega New Cloth compilation
- No. of episodes: 46

Release
- Original network: TV Asahi
- Original release: April 7, 2013 – March 30, 2014

Season chronology
- ← Previous; Season 1

The second and final season of the Saint Seiya Omega anime series is produced by Toei Animation. It began broadcasting on TV Asahi in Japan on April 7, 2013. As with the rest of the series, the season follows the adventures of Pegasus Kōga and his friends, along with Athena's Saints, in their fight against the Goddess Pallas and her army of Pallasites, assisted by the brand new Steel Saint Subaru.

This season is directed by Tatsuya Nagamine and Kohei Kureta and written by Yoshimi Narita. Toshihiko Sahashi is the returning composer of the anime. From episode 52 to 77, otherwise known as "Chapter New Cloth" (新生聖衣(ニュークロス)編, Nyū Kurosu Hen), the opening theme is "Saint Evolution Omega" (未来聖闘士(セイントエボリューション)Ω, Seinto Eboryūshon Omega) performed by the band Nagareda Project. From episode 78 to 97, comprising the "Chapter Omega Awakens" (Ω覚醒編, Omega Kakusei Hen), the opening theme is "Senkō Strings" (閃光ストリングス, Senkō Sturingusu; "Flashing Strings") performed by the band Cyntia.

This season's first twenty-six episodes were collected in both a Blu-ray and a DVD box released on January 29, 2014. The following episodes are set to be released in two boxes to be released on July 25, 2014.

== Episodes ==
No. overall	No. in season	Title	Original release date
52	1	"The New Cloth! Take Flight, New Pegasus!"; Transliteration: "Aratana Kurosu! Tobe, Nyū Pegasasu!" (Japanese: 新たな聖衣（クロス）！翔べ、新生（ニュー）ペガサス！)	April 7, 2013
One year after the defeat of Abzu, peace has returned to the world. However, a new threat rises with the advent of Pallas, an old enemy of Athena. Despite knowing that, Seiya can't find the resolve to kill the young Pallas as she is still an innocent child although she is destined to eventually come after Saori's life. Meanwhile, Kōga, training while still recuperating after his final battle against Abzu, meets Subaru, a Steel Saint who is eager to challenge him in order to become a God. However, Kōga refuses to fight him and claims that with the world in peace and his cloth destroyed, there is no reason for him to fight anymore. However, a Class-3 Pallasite named Tarvos, one of Pallas' minions armed with a Morning Star as his weapon, attacks the three of them. Watching Tatsumi take the hit in his stead and Subaru quickly being outmatched, Kōga burns his Cosmo, and the Pegasus Cloth is revived into a New Cloth. At the same time, Kiki and Raki are confronted by the Class-2 Pallasite Whip Dione who flees when Kiki unleash Starlight Extinction. Equipping his New Cloth, Kōga easily overpowers Tarvos and defeats him.
53	2	"The Reunion! Souma, Let Your Spirit's Flame Burn!"; Transliteration: "Saikai! Sōma yo, Tamashii no Honō o Moyase!" (Japanese: 再会！蒼摩よ、魂の炎を燃やせ！)	April 14, 2013
With the Gold Saints protecting Athena and the Silver Saints looking for clues about the new enemies, Kōga is instructed by Seiya and Saori to assemble the other Bronze Saints. Followed by Subaru, Kōga reunites with Sōma at the Palaestra, where he is now working as a substitute teacher. However, when the Class-3 Pallasite Loge, a master of spear combat appears at the Palaestra, Kōga, Sōma, and Subaru work together to protect the students by taking out the bees while Sōma engages Loge, despite not having fixed his Cloth since the battle against Abzu. Before he is defeated, however, Kōga arrives in the nick of time and defeats Loge with his Pegasus Meteor Fist. Sōma decides to quit his position as substitute teacher and go with Kōga in order to fix his Cloth for the new battle.
54	3	"Strengthen My Courage! Cloth, Be Reborn!"; Transliteration: "Yūki o Chikara ni! Kurosu yo, Umarekaware!" (Japanese: 勇気を力に！聖衣（クロス）よ、生まれ変われ！)	April 21, 2013
Sōma, Kōga, and Subaru travel to meet Kiki and Raki in order to have Sōma's cloth fixed. Yuna arrives there first, but upon having her Cloth restored, she finds herself unable to use it and Kiki claims that it is due to her indecision that is wavering her Cosmo. However, when Raki is attacked by the two Class-3 Pallasite Claw twins Methone and Ymir, Yuna finally gains the resolve to awaken her new Aquila Cloth and fight once more as the Aquila Saint with the help of Sōma in his new Lionet Cloth. Together, they easily defeat the Pallasite twins, who flee afterwards.
55	4	"The Irreplaceable One! Dragon, Awake!"; Transliteration: "Kakegaenonaimono! Mezame yo, Doragon!" (Japanese: かけがえのないもの！目覚めよ、龍（ドラゴン）！)	April 28, 2013
Unaware of the advent of the Pallasites, Ryūhō believes that there is no reason to fight anymore and wants to return the Dragon Cloth to his father Shiryū, whose senses were restored after their fight against Abzu, and live peacefully with his family. Meanwhile, Kōga and the others learn that a Pallasite is after Ryūhō and rush to assist him, but when Ryūhō finds himself struggling to protect his mother Shunrei from the Class-3 Pallasite Twinrod Halimede, his renewed determination awakens his true power as the Dragon Saint and the new Dragon Cloth, with which he defeats Halimede with his Rising Dragon.
56	5	"Resound in my Heart! Haruto's Shout!"; Transliteration: "Kokoro ni Hibike! Haruto no Shauto!" (Japanese: 心に響け！栄斗のシャウト！)	May 5, 2013
With Yuna, Sōma, and Ryūhō leaving ahead to the Sanctuary, Kōga and Subaru look for Haruto in Japan and find, much to their surprise, that he is now a singer in a rock band. Haruto rejects Kōga's pleas to return, claiming that to him, his music is now more important than being a Saint. However, during a concert, Haruto watches Kōga and Subaru being attacked by Pallasites led by the Class-3 Pallasite Dagger Hati, and to protect his friends and his fans, he dons his brand new Wolf Cloth to join the battle. When Haruto finally finds a weakness to Hati's senses and uses a wolf howling to temporarily weaken his enemy, Kōga unleash a Pegasus Meteor Fist. However, his attack is easily deflected by the Class-2 Pallasite Servant Rhea. Realizing a new enemy indeed has approached and with his fans frozen in time, Haruto joins his friends to the Sanctuary.
57	6	"Defeat Pegasus! Eden, the Warrior of Solitude!"; Transliteration: "Pegasasu o Taose! Kokō no Senshi Eden!" (Japanese: ペガサスを倒せ！孤高の戦士エデン！)	May 12, 2013
Koga and Subaru are sent by Shaina to investigate the disappearance of a Silver Saint. Upon finding their missing companion, they are approached by the Class-2 Pallasite Chakram Europa and the Class-3 Pallasite Hammer Thebe and learn, much to their surprise that Eden is now working with them as the Class-3 Club Pallasite, with the promise of having Aria and the rest of his family revived. With orders to kill Kōga, Eden attacks him mercilessly until Thebe decides to intervene. Taunting Eden, Thebe unleash his Gigantic Meteor, shattering his Chronotector. Eden, unharmed, insults the Chronotector he wore while faking his allegiance to the Pallasites, before revealing his new Orion Cloth, easily defeating Thebe with his Tonitrui Saltare.
58	7	"The Four Great Kings Arrive! Athena vs. Pallas Complete Showdown!"; Transliteration: "Shiten'ō Arawaru! Atena Tai Parasu Zenmen Taiketsu!" (Japanese: 四天王現わる！アテナ対パラス全面対決！)	May 19, 2013
In several locations around the globe, time is stopped by the work of the Pallasites. Meanwhile, the four Class-1 Pallasites known as the Four Heavenly Kings, are reunited before their master. To restore peace to the world, Athena assembles her Saints and declares war on Pallas' forces. Knowing that Saori's life is in danger, a desperate Kōga meets Tarvos, who is eager to have a rematch with him, eventually defeating him once more after getting hold of his emotions.
59	8	"The Bond between Brothers! Andromeda Shun Joins the Battle!"; Transliteration: "Kyōdai no Kizuna! Andoromeda Shun, Sansen!" (Japanese: 兄弟の絆！アンドロメダ瞬、参戦！)	May 26, 2013
Ryūhō, Sōma, and Yuna arrive to a village whose survivors of Halimede's attack are under Shun's protection, who is now able to wear his Cloth again after Abzu's defeat. Among them is Rey, a child whose brother was frozen by Halimede and blames Shun for it. Halimede instructs Rey to steal the Andromeda Cloth Stone from Shun with the promise of having his brother return to normal, but when the enemy intends to kill both, Shun's Cloth evolves into the Andromeda New Cloth, and he easily defeats Halimede.
60	9	"The Star of Steel! Subaru, Embrace your Fighting Spirit of Steel!"; Transliteration: "Kōtetsu no Hoshi! Subaru yo, Hagane no Tōshi o Idake!" (Japanese: 鋼鉄の星！昴よ、鋼の闘志を抱け！)	June 2, 2013
The Steel Saints training facility is stormed by the Pallasites led by Hati. Kōga and Subaru arrive soon after and they learn that the residents had previously evacuated with former Bronze Saints Lionet Ban and Wolf Nachi, now trainers for the Steel Saints. While investigating, Kōga learns about Subaru's origins from his fellow Steel Saint Erna, and it is revealed that among the Steel Saints, Subaru has the strongest Cosmo, and that one day he may find his own Guardian Constellation and become a proper Saint. Hati attacks the Saints again, killing Erna during the battle. Subaru, donning his friend's Steel Cloth, manages to overpower Hati's Cosmo, causing the Pallasite to flee.
61	10	"A Great Army Approaches! The Battle to Defend Palaestra!"; Transliteration: "Semaru Daigunzei! Paraisutora Bōei Sen!" (Japanese: 迫る大軍勢！パライストラ防衛戦！)	June 9, 2013
Kōga and Subaru return to the Palaestra which has many refugees from the villages attacked by the Pallasites and rendezvous with their friends. Genbu approaches the Bronze Saints and, noticing how much their Cloths have been damaged, reprimands them for relying too much on them instead of their own abilities. When a large enemy force, led by the Class-2 Pallasite Gauntlet Aegir, surrounds the Palaestra, Genbu decides to face it head on by himself, defeating Thebe in one hit, before taking on Aegir. Easily dominating the battle and about to deal the final blow, Genbu is interrupted when the Holy Sword Tenchi Destruction Slash suddenly appears between him and Aegir.
62	11	"Genbu's Deadly Battle! Excalibur vs. the Sword of Libra"; Transliteration: "Genbu no Shitō! Ekusukaribā tai Raibura no Sōdo!" (Japanese: 玄武の死闘！聖剣（エクスカリバー）対天秤（ライブラ）の剣（ソード）！)	June 23, 2013
Aegir fails to defeat Genbu by himself and the Class-1 Pallasite Hyperion lends his own sword, Tenchi Destruction Slash, to assist him. Overwhelmed by the massive Cosmo flowing from the sword, the Gold Saint decides to forfeit his own life in an attempt to destroy it, managing to inflict a little crack on the sword. Kōga, in retaliation, defeats Aegir with his Pegasus Meteor Fist. Before dying, Genbu reveals to Kōga the ultimate Cosmo greater than the Seventh Sense, Omega.
63	12	"Seiya, Head to the Frontlines! Athena's Decision!"; Transliteration: "Seiya, Shutsujin! Atena no Ketsui!" (Japanese: 星矢、出陣！アテナの決意！)	July 7, 2013
As the Saints mourn Genbu's death, Hati appears to resume the assault on the Palaestra until Seiya and Athena appear to drive the enemies away. Having finally decided to confront her sister, Saori takes advantage of the curse placed on her to find out where Pallas is hiding.
64	13	"Go Forward, Saint! The Innaccesible Road to Pallasvelda!"; Transliteration: "Susume Seinto! Parasu Beruda e Kewashiki Michi!" (Japanese: 進め聖闘士（セイント）！パラスベルダへ険しきへ道！)	July 14, 2013
Now knowing where Pallas is located, Seiya decides to lead an attack on her stronghold with the intention to kill her. On the way to meet him there, Kōga and his friends are ambushed by the Class-3 Pallasite Cyllene and Haruto stays behind to confront him. Subaru decides to assist him ignoring his friends' warning and the two are confronted by Cyllene's twin brother Greip. Retreating, Haruto and Subaru escape to a forest where Haruto heals Subaru's wound before they are confronted by the Pallasites again. Working together, Subaru and Haruto defeat Cyllene and Greip who flees shortly afterwards.
65	14	"Break Down the Gate of the Iron Wall! Pegasus's Spear and Dragon's Shield!"; Transliteration: "Yabure Teppeki no Mon! Pegasasu no Hoko to Doragon no Tate!" (Japanese: 破れ鉄壁の門！天馬（ペガサス）の矛と龍（ドラゴン）の盾！)	July 21, 2013
Once the Saints infiltrate the city, Seiya draws the attention of the enemy allowing Kōga and the others to push forward. However, Tarvos appears in his new Chronotector. Challenging Kōga to a final battle to the death, he almost wins until Ryūhō arrives to assist Kōga. Teaming up, the Bronze Saints destroy Tarvos' Chronotector before Kōga kills him with the Pegasus Rolling Crash.
66	15	"The Steel Struggle! The Nameless Warriors!"; Transliteration: "Kōtetsu Funtō! Namonaki Yūsha-tachi!" (Japanese: 鋼鉄奮闘！名もなき勇者たち！)	July 28, 2013
As the battle intensifies, Sōma and Subaru fall back to assist the other Steel Saints in time to rescue only two of them, Kerry and Emma. Soon after, they are attacked by Loge and are forced to retreat once Sōma is injured. Surrounded by the enemy forces, Sōma and the Steel Saints work together to break Loge's siege, before Sōma finally kills Loge. Their victory is short-lived when a final bee kills Kerry, who sacrificed himself to defend Sōma.
67	16	"Subaru, the Cosmo of Wonder! Eden's Mission!"; Transliteration: "Subaru, Kyōi no Kosumo! Eden no Shimei!" (Japanese: 昴、驚異の小宇宙（コスモ）！エデンの使命！)	August 4, 2013
Eden wanders through the city drawn by a strange Cosmo when he meets Europa. Engaging the Class-2 Pallasite in unequal combat, Eden is saved by Seiya. Inspired by the Gold Saint to look for a reason to fight, Eden pursues Europa who was sent in a mission to kill Kōga. He struggles to fight the Class-2 Pallasite while defending the others. Just then, Subaru unleashes an impressive power that was dormant within him, leaving Europa vulnerable for Eden to finally land a hit, causing him to flee. Curious about who Subaru truly is, Eden decides to accompany Kōga and his friends in order to keep an eye on him.
68	17	"Koga and Pallas! Encounter on the Battlefield!"; Transliteration: "Kōga to Parasu! Senjō no Deai!" (Japanese: 光牙とパラス！戦場の出会い！)	August 11, 2013
The Bronze Saints rescue civilians who were unaffected by Pallas' curse when Kōga has an encounter with a young girl, unaware that she is none other than Pallas herself who has sneaked out of her castle. The Bronze Saints are shortly after confronted by Titan who immobilize them with his Holy Sword, Tenjin Genesis Sword. Seiya arrives to save them and kill Pallas, but Titan reflects the arrow. Kōga, despite being affected by the sword, steps between, taking the arrow to his shoulder. Meanwhile, Saori's body grows weaker due to her Cosmo being drained as Shiryū, Hyōga, and Shun approach the battlefield.
69	18	"Stir the Storm of Flames! Yuna and Souma's Friendship!"; Transliteration: "Honō no Arashi o Okose! Yuna to Sōma no Yūjō!" (Japanese: 炎の嵐を起こせ！ユナと蒼摩の友情！)	August 18, 2013
To increase his power for his rematch against Yuna and Sōma, Methone uses a dreadful item given to him by Europa to kill his sister Ymir and drain her Cosmo, and the two Bronze Saints must combine their strengths against the empowered Pallasite, as they reminisce upon the day they first met. Realizing the true power of friendship, Sōma and Yuna eventually overpower Methone and defeat him, him being killed by Ymir's spirit moments later.
70	19	"The Cloth Destroyer! The Stray Pallasite Attack!"; Transliteration: "Kurosu no Hakaisha! Hagure Parasaito Raishū!" (Japanese: 聖衣（クロス）の破壊者！はぐれパラサイト来襲！)	September 1, 2013
The second day of battles begin, and Kōga, Ryūhō, Haruto, and Subaru take a chance to make a beeline for the Palace until they are intercepted by Mira, a Pallasite of unknown rank who fights without donning his Chronotector. Despite seemingly at a disadvantage, Mira easily overpowers the party with his speed and his Alchemy Glove's mysterious power to destroy Cloths just by touching them, until Haruto realizes his trick and comes up with a way to fight back, but Mira is barely scathed by the counter. Just as he is about to don his Chronotector, he is interrupted by Europa.
71	20	"The Accursed Cloth!? The Equuleus Saint!"; Transliteration: "Norowareta Kurosu!? Ekureusu no Seinto!" (Japanese: 呪われた聖衣（クロス）!?小馬座（エクレウス）の聖闘士（セイント）！)	September 15, 2013
On their way to the palace, Kōga and his friends meet Celeris, who fights to protect the refugees with the Equuleus Cloth, despite taking heed of the dreaded curse that befalls whoever dons it. They also meet Selene, a young girl who takes care of all the humans who hide underground who has not been frozen in time, and Eden has to fight Thebe once again, while Subaru and Celeris encounter Hati and have a short battle with him. Following a vicious battle, Eden finally kills Thebe.
72	21	"The Inherited Cloth! The Birth of Equuleus Subaru!"; Transliteration: "Kurosu, Keishō! Ekureusu no Subaru, Tanjō!" (Japanese: 聖衣（クロス）、継承！小馬座（エクレウス）の昴、誕生！)	September 22, 2013
Kōga's party departs to the palace through the secret passage shown by Celeris. However, worried about him, Subaru returns to assist the Equuleus Saint, but can do nothing to stop him from sacrificing himself to kill Hati. Before passing away, Celeris entrusts the damaged Equuleus Clothstone to Subaru, and upon rejoining his fellow Bronze Saints, Subaru unlocks its true power to protect them from Cyllene and Greip's assault, becoming the new Equuleus Bronze Saint. Easily blocking their attacks, Subaru kills them both before collapsing when the Cloth suddenly leaves his body.
73	22	"Tears of Equuleus!? Awakening Two Cloths!"; Transliteration: "Ekureusu no Namida!? Kakusei-suru Futatsu no Kurosu!" (Japanese: 小馬座（エクレウス）の涙!?覚醒する二つの聖衣（クロス）！)	September 29, 2013
Raki arrives at the city surrounding Pallasvelda to assist the others with a delivery of Cloth-restoring Stardust Sand but is attacked by Halimede, armed with a new triple rod. Kōga and Subaru appear to protect her, but while Kōga's cloth is too damaged, Subaru's suddenly stops moving out of grief for all the Saints who died wearing it. Eventually, he manages to help Equuleus overcome its sorrow and he kills Halimede with a Pleiades Tempest. Meanwhile, Saori awakens and retrieves the Cloth of Athena to join the battle as well, accompanied by Kiki, Fudō, and Harbinger, the last to whom she has entrusted the protection of the Cloth. Meanwhile, Professor Asamori decides to send Daichi, Ushio, and Shō, the original Steel Saints to the battlefield.
74	23	"Kiki's Battle! The Friends That Surpass Generations!"; Transliteration: "Kiki no Tatakai! Sedai o Koeta Nakama!" (Japanese: 貴鬼の闘い！世代を越えた仲間！)	October 6, 2013
Kōga and his friends keep traveling in order to find Kiki and fix their Cloths, as only Eden and Subaru can clear a path for the others. They rendezvous with Shaina and Kiki who repairs their Cloths while explaining to each of them what they must focus on the most while fighting. However, Dione appears, and while the legendary Steel Saints Shō, Daichi and Ushio buy some time fending of the Pallasites with the other Saints, Kiki soon arrives to kill Dione himself, before Kōga and his friends, with reinforced and fixed Cloths, head off continuing their quest to defeat Pallas.
75	24	"The Destined Encounter! The Return of Gemini!"; Transliteration: "Sadame no Kaigō! Jemini, Futatabi!" (Japanese: 定めの邂逅！双子座（ジェミニ）、再び！)	October 13, 2013
As Saori and her escorts advance through the city overcoming all opposition, Ryūhō is separated from his fellow Bronze Saints by Paradox, who returns as the Class-2 Staff Pallasite for a rematch. Paradox's sister Integra appears to assist him as the new Gemini Gold Saint, while the last of the legendary Saints, Phoenix Ikki, prepares himself to join the battle as well.
76	25	"The Legendary Bird! Phoenix Ikki Arrives!"; Transliteration: "Fushichō! Fenikkusu no Ikki, Kenzan!" (Japanese: 不死鳥！鳳凰座（フェニックス）の一輝、見参！)	October 20, 2013
As Kōga and his friends approach Pallas' fortress, Mira appears before them again in his Chronotector, but Ikki arrives in the nick of time to protect them. After the Pallasite flees, Ikki reveals to the other Bronze Saints that Pallas is not their greatest enemy, but an even greater foe who is manipulating the whole conflict from the shadows.
77	26	"Move Time! Athena's Saints Gather!"; Transliteration: "Toki yo Ugoke! Tsudoishi Atena no Seinto!" (Japanese: 刻よ動け！集いしアテナの聖闘士（セイント）！)	October 27, 2013
The Bronze Saints finally arrive at the front of Pallas' castle, which is sealed by the "Gate of Time", a massive door reinforced with Titan's powers. Kōga attempts to break through the gate by himself but his own life is put in danger instead, until Athena and her Saints arrive to lend a hand.
78	27	"The Deciding Battle Begins! To Determine the Fate of the Goddesses!"; Transliteration: "Kessen no Hajimari! Shukumei no Megami no Moto e!" (Japanese: 決戦の始まり！宿命の女神のもとへ！)	November 3, 2013
Once inside the castle, Saori and the Saints are informed by Europa that only one of the four separate paths ahead of them lead to Pallas, and flees soon after, thus they decide to split up: Kōga, Sōma, Yuna and Shun choose Alfheim; Eden, Subaru, Haruto and Hyōga take Niflheim; Ryūhō and Shiryū enter Dvergr; Athena and the Gold Saints take Vanaheim. Meanwhile, the Heavenly Kings conspire together not only against Athena, but against Pallas as well.
79	28	"The Offense and Defense Assassin! Shun's Secret Chain!"; Transliteration: "Kōbō Ittai no Shikaku! Shun, Hisaku no Chēn!" (Japanese: 攻防一体の刺客！瞬、秘策の鎖（チェーン）！)	November 10, 2013
Kōga, Yuna, and Sōma advance through the first path while Shun stays behind to deal with the enemy reinforcements. However, the Class-2 Pallasite Mystic Stone Surtr blocks their path enveloped in a defensive barrier that seems impenetrable. The Bronze Saints are about to lose the battle until Shun catches up with them and realizes the secret behind the enemy's trick. Combining their powers, Kōga breaks Surtr's Mystic Stone before Shun is forced to kill the Pallasite with his Nebula Storm technique.
80	29	"The King of Time! Hyoga's Absolute Zero Air!"; Transliteration: "Toki no Ō! Hyōga, Zettai Reido no Tōki!" (Japanese: 時の王！氷河、絶対零度の凍気！)	November 24, 2013
Tokisada, the former Aquarius Gold Saint who was supposed to be defeated by Haruto at the End of Time, appears before him, Eden and Subaru as the Class-2 Deathwatch Pallasite at the second path, donning a Chronotector that enhances his time-controlling abilities. Haruto, Eden and Subaru struggle against his near invincible technique until Hyōga appears to battle him in their place. Facing the One Thousand Wars due to an equal strength, Hyōga eventually turns the outcome and emerge victorious after placing Tokisada inside the Freezing Coffin.
81	30	"Putting On the Chronotector! The Four Heavenly Kings' Attack!"; Transliteration: "Kuronotekutā Sōchaku! Shiten'ō no Shōgeki!" (Japanese: 刻衣（クロノテクター）装着！四天王の衝撃！)	December 1, 2013
While Eden questions Subaru who he really is, Kōga, Sōma, Yuna, and Shun encounter the Class-1 Pallasite Aegaeon who wants to test the Bronze Saints' powers himself. Drawing his sword Graviton Lightning Slash Blade, and telling the Saints about how Ikki put his life on the line to crack Aegaeon's sword, he accepts Shun's challenge. Despite using his best attacks, Aegaeon easily defeats him, before turning his attention towards Kōga, Sōma, and Yuna, who keep fighting him to defend Shun. Burning his Cosmo to the maximum, Kōga manages to give Aegaeon a crack to his sword, before Ikki arrives to save the Bronze Saints, taking over the battle.
82	31	"The Peak Fighting Spirit! Ikki vs. Aegaeon!"; Transliteration: "Tōshi no Kiwami! Ikki tai Aigaion!" (Japanese: 闘志の極み！一輝対アイガイオン！)	December 8, 2013
Ikki fights Aegaeon alone while Kōga, Sōma, Yuna, and Shun keep moving onward. During the battle, Ikki and Aegaeon sustain grievous wounds, while Ikki is successful in finally destroying Aegaeon's Holy Sword. Meanwhile, the Gold Saints discuss Harbinger's loyalty to Athena since she gave the Athena Cloth to him for safekeeping, telling the Gold Saint that Athena trusts him. At the same time, Titan tries to calm down Pallas as she snaps after a Class-4 Pallasite informs her of Ikki fighting Aegaeon. At the end of their battle, Ikki sacrifices himself to kill Aegaeon and all his fellow Saints grieve over his death, while Gallia and Hyperion comment on the Saint's strength, and Titan mourns over Aegaeon's death. For some mysterious reason, Europa appears at the place where Ikki and Aegaeon fought, taking the remaining hilt of the Graviton Lightning Slash Blade with him.
83	32	"Shiryū and Ryūhō! Spirit of the Five Old Peaks!"; Transliteration: "Shiryū to Ryūhō! Gorōhō no Tamashii!" (Japanese: 紫龍と龍峰！五老峰の魂！)	December 15, 2013
After mourning the death of Ikki, Shiryū and Ryūhō face off against Rhea. Fighting alone, Shiryū shows Ryūhō his strength before being defeated by a hidden attack from Rhea which pierces his Gold Cloth, leaving Ryūhō to fight alone. Being easily outmatched by the Pallasite, Ryūhō suddenly burns his Cosmo and surpass the Seventh Sense, almost defeating Rhea. However, he collapses before that due to the massive amount of energy he used. Shiryū, revealing that he allowed Rhea to take him down in order to evaluate Ryūhō's Cosmo, easily kills Rhea with his Rozan Rising Dragon. Later, after having recovered from the battle, Ryūhō realizes that he managed to awaken a portion of the Omega during the fight.
84	33	"The Approaching Shadow! The Gold Saints Protecting Athena!"; Transliteration: "Semaru Kage! Atena Mamorishi Gōrudo Seinto!" (Japanese: 迫る影！アテナ守りし黄金聖闘士（ゴールドセイント）！)	December 22, 2013
Athena, Seiya, Kiki, Fudō and Harbinger are attacked by their former Gemini Gold Saint ally Paradox. Integra, the new Gemini Gold Saint and Paradox's twin sister, arrives to protect Athena and settle their score. Once defeated, Paradox is forgiven by Saori and reforms, just to be later fatally wounded by the Class-1 Pallasite Gallia.
85	34	"Fighting Destiny! The Confession of Rebellion!"; Transliteration: "Unmei ni Aragae! Hangyaku no Kokuhaku!" (Japanese: 運命に抗え！反逆の告白！)	January 5, 2014
After dealing with Paradox, Gallia turns her attention to Athena and the Gold Saints, easily deflecting all their attacks with her Holy Sword Bushin Photon Sword, until she reveals her Photon Tector. Meanwhile, the other three groups figure out the meaning of their endless running, figuring out that someone has put them into an endless corridor. As Seiya's attacks are easily deflected, and Gallia is about to kill him, Pallas informs her to stand back, with Gallia mocking Pallas for receiving no love in spite of being the Goddess of Love. However, Integra and Paradox combine their Cosmos, and destroy Europa's trick with the Another Dimension, allowing the other Saints to reach the battlefield. However, Paradox succumbs to her wounds and dies in Integra's arms, fulfilling her destiny as the Gemini Gold Saint.
86	35	"The Secret of the Cloths! A New Power Is Activated!"; Transliteration: "Kurosu no Himitsu! Hatsudō-suru Aratana Chikara!" (Japanese: 聖衣（クロス）の秘密！発動する新たな力！)	January 12, 2014
Kōga, Sōma, Yuna, Ryūhō, Haruto, Eden and Subaru face off against Gallia on their own, allowing the Gold Saints and Athena to move forward towards Pallas. Although Gallia's Photon Tector and Bushin Photon Sword seem impervious to harm, Subaru once more calls on the mysterious powerful Cosmo to break through Gallia's offensive and actually damage the sword before being defeated, convincing the others to call upon their own Cosmo, transforming their New Cloths into the more powerful Omega Cloths, and together the six Omega Saints finally kill Gallia.
87	36	"The Gold Union! The Forbidden Mystery!"; Transliteration: "Gōrudo Danketsu! Kinjirareta Ōgi!" (Japanese: 黄金（ゴールド）団結！禁じられた奥義！)	January 19, 2014
Fudō, Kiki, and Shiryū face off against Hyperion, allowing Athena, Seiya, and Harbinger to move forward. Hyperion's Destruction Tector and Tenchi Destruction Slash holy sword prove too powerful for the three Gold Saints' attacks on their own. In a final show of strength, they combine their Cosmo into a single forbidden attack: Athena Exclamation. The Saints and Pallasites throughout Pallasvelda react to the outpouring of Cosmo, and as the Tenchi Destruction Slash is destroyed, the three Saints' Cosmo vanishes.
88	37	"The Remaining Determination! The Great Saints' Teachings!"; Transliteration: "Nokosareta Ishi! Ōinaru Seinto no Oshie!" (Japanese: 残された意志！大いなる聖闘士（セイント）の教え！)	January 26, 2014
The Omega Saints investigate what they believe to be the final resting place of Shiryū, Kiki, and Fudō, who sacrificed themselves to defeat Hyperion, but they discover that while the Tenchi Destruction Slash has been destroyed, Hyperion has survived with barely a scratch. Kōga and his friends burn their Cosmos and attempts to use the power of their new Omega Cloths to take down Hyperion for good. During the battle, Subaru's great and powerful Cosmo once again surfaces to everyone's surprise, along with the proclamation that he is a god. However, after seemingly defeating Hyperion, a strange voice talks to him from within and he starts to lose it until Hyperion launches Subaru into a wall, stealing his time with the Chrono Destruction, horrifying Kōga and the others.
89	38	"Awaken! The Ultimate Omega!"; Transliteration: "Mezamero! Kyūkyoku no Omega!" (Japanese: 目覚めろ！究極のΩ（オメガ）！)	February 2, 2014
As Subaru's time is taken away by the Chrono Destruction, Kōga, Sōma, Yuna, Ryūhō, Haruto, and Eden confront Hyperion in a desperate battle while Subaru's mind awakens in an unknown place, greeted by a mysterious figure. Meanwhile, his friends keep fighting to protect Subaru despite Hyperion attacking them with full power, shattering their Bronze Cloths. Still capable of fighting back, they burn their Cosmos together and finally attain the true power of Omega by elevating their Cosmo to the next level, the Macro Cosmo. Donning their new Omega Cloths, the Saints overpower Hyperion and guided by their light, Subaru returns to life and launches Hyperion to the air, where he is killed by his own suicide attack. However, once the Pallasite is defeated for good, the shadow following Subaru warns him of the risks of mere humans attaining a power equal to the gods before leaving, and Subaru recognizes the mysterious figure as himself, much to his astonishment.
90	39	"Taurus Charge!! Reaching Pallas's Chamber!"; Transliteration: "Taurusu Tosshin!! Tōsatsu, Parasu no Ma!" (Japanese: 牡牛（タウルス）突進!!到達、パラスの間！)	February 9, 2014
Accompanied only by Seiya and Harbinger, Saori finally comes face to face with Pallas. Titan steps in to protect his master and Harbinger challenges the Pallasite, using Athena's cloth to draw his attention. Treating him as a mere ruffian, Titan is surprised by the true might of the Taurus Saint, who proves himself far more powerful and noble than he claims to be. Following a brutal battle, Harbinger manages to burn his Cosmo to a level powerful enough to shatter Titan's Holy Sword, earning his praise. Now exhausted and grievously wounded, Harbinger gives Athena her Cloth so she may fight Pallas. The two Goddesses equip their Cloth and Chronotector respectively, ready for their battle.
91	40	"Athena and Pallas! Showdown of the Goddesses!"; Transliteration: "Atena to Parasu! Megami no Kessen!" (Japanese: アテナとパラス！女神の決戦！)	February 16, 2014
The long awaited confrontation between Athena and Pallas begins. Saori tries her best to dissuade Pallas, but her drive to enact revenge on Athena is stronger. However, even while draining her sister's energy and donning the strongest of all Chronotectors, Pallas is defeated by Athena and Titan stands between them to protect her in the last moment. To protect Saori, Seiya, bringing forth the true power of the Sagittarius Cloth, steps in to confront the Pallasite.
92	41	"Seiya's True Feelings! The Lie From His Return!"; Transliteration: "Seiya no Honshin! Itsuwari kara no Kikan!" (Japanese: 星矢の本心！偽りからの帰還！)	February 23, 2014
After donning his Sagittarius God Cloth, Seiya battles Titan, who questions his loyalty to Athena and the Gold Saint reveals that his drive to follow Saori comes from his true feelings for her. Knowing how he feels out of his devotion to Pallas, the Pallasite attacks with all his Cosmo, just to be wounded by Seiya's final arrow. Pallas intervenes to protect Titan and Saori then reconciles with her, seeing how she has reformed after assuming her love for him. However, Europa appears and uses the curse laid on the Goddesses to drain their Cosmos and pours it on Subaru, who is revealed to be the Pallasites' true master: Saturn, the God of Time.
93	42	"The God of Time! The Ascent of Saturn!"; Transliteration: "Toki no Kami! Satān Kōrin!" (Japanese: 刻の神！サターン降臨！)	March 2, 2014
Subaru awakens as Saturn, the God of Time, the one who bestowed the Pallasites their Chronotectors and Holy Swords. Accompanied by Europa and Mira, revealed to be Class-1 Pallasites, Saturn equips his own Chronotector before informing the Saints that he had descended to Earth and erased his past memories to live among mankind and determine their worthiness. Having regained his former self, he then declares that humanity no longer deserves to remain on the Earth and uses his powers to freeze all of its inhabitants, before retreating to his heavenly palace with his servants. Determined to make Saturn pay and have Subaru return to normal, Seiya and the young Saints depart to confront him in the sky, but just after they depart, the wounded Harbinger and Titan steel themselves to defend Pallas and Athena when Europa and Mira return to dispose of the goddesses. However, Shun and Hyōga appear to fight in their place.
94	43	"Fighter of Hope! The Ties That Bind Saints!"; Transliteration: "Kibō no Tōshi! Seinto no Kizuna!" (Japanese: 希望の闘士！聖闘士（セイント）の絆！)	March 9, 2014
While Seiya, Kōga, and the other Omega Saints travel to face off against Saturn, and Shun and Hyōga prepare for battle with Europa and Mira, the Steel Saints face Aegir who survived his defeat by Kōga's doing, fusing his Gauntlet with a shard from Hyperion's Tenshi Destruction Slash and gaining the Phantom Arm of Hyperion, and all hope seems lost until Shō, Ushio and Daichi arrives to help them. However, their Steel Cloths suddenly malfunction, leaving them unable to fight. Nachi, Ban, Emma and the Steel Saints rejoice as their old ally Jabu reveals himself on the battlefield, engaging Aegir in single combat. Overcoming his Phantom Arm of Hyperion, Jabu kills Aegir with his Unicorn Gallop before leading his comrades in the charge against the remaining Pallasites.
95	44	"Overcome the God! Seiya's Cosmo!"; Transliteration: "Kami o Koero! Seiya no Kosumo!" (Japanese: 神を超えろ！星矢の小宇宙（コスモ）！)	March 16, 2014
As Kōga and the others are in conflict about fighting the one who once was their comrade, Seiya faces off against Saturn, the God of Time, while Shun and Hyōga protect Athena and Pallas from Europa and Mira. None of his attacks seems to have any effect, and Seiya's God Cloth only suffers more damage after each attempt. Down on Earth, Mira and Europa defeat Hyōga and Shun while they are distracted. However, the two Saints stand up after having immobilized the Pallasites. Hyōga kills Mira, but Europa barely survives Shun's Nebula Storm, being killed by a final burst of energy from Titan. Out of strength, Titan leaves the rest up to Seiya and the Omega Saints. Seiya attempts one final attack against Saturn, finally reaching close enough to stab the God of Time with the golden dagger which is capable of slaying gods.
96	45	"The Final Battle! Go, Omega Saints!"; Transliteration: "Saigo no Tatakai! Yuke, Omega no Seinto!" (Japanese: 最後の闘い！ゆけ、Ω（オメガ）の聖闘士（セイント）！)	March 23, 2014
Seiya is defeated by Saturn before Kōga and his friends also fall before his almighty power, following a desperate battle in which the Omega Saints are defeated one by one. When all seems lost, Athena gathers the Cosmos of all the other Saints to restore Kōga, who rises again as the Pegasus Super Omega Saint, determined to stop the God of Time once and for all.
97	46	"The End of the Battle! Become a Legend, Koga!"; Transliteration: "Tatakai no Hate! Kōga yo, Densetsu to Nare!" (Japanese: 闘いの果て！光牙よ、伝説となれ！)	March 30, 2014
After a long and vicious final battle, Kōga and his friends convince Saturn to recognize the true value of mankind as he regains his lost memories from when he fought by their side as Subaru. The God of Time then takes his leave and while the efforts to rebuild the Sanctuary and Pallasvelda begin, Kōga and Eden embark on a journey together to find their own place in the world as a new era unfolds.
