= Saint Seiya Omega season 1 =

Season of television series

Saint Seiya Omega
- Season 1
- No. of episodes: 51

Release
- Original network: TV Asahi
- Original release: April 1, 2012 – March 31, 2013

Season chronology
- Next → Season 2

The first and penultimate season of the Saint Seiya Omega anime series was produced by Toei Animation and aired on TV Asahi from April 1, 2012, to March 31, 2013. The season follow the adventures of Kōga, the newest wearer of the Pegasus Bronze Cloth in charge of protecting the goddess Athena alongside the 87 warriors known as Saints who defends Athena. He goes on a quest to battle the War God Mars and his army of Martians to protect Athena and the world from chaos.

The season is directed by Morio Hatano and written by Reiko Yoshida. Bandai Visual is collecting the series in both DVD and Blu-ray format with each volume containing four episodes. The first volume of Saint Seiya Omega was released on August 24, 2012. Two pieces of theme music were used for the season. The first opening theme, used for "Chapter Mars" (マルス編, Marusu Hen), is "Pegasus Fantasy ver. Omega" (ペガサス幻想 ver.Ω, Pegasasu Fantajī Bājon Omega) performed by Make-Up's vocalist Nobuo Yamada featuring Shoko Nakagawa. The second opening theme, used for "Chapter Zodiac Temples" (十二宮編, Jūnikyū Hen) beginning with episode 28, is "Next Generation" (新星Ω神話(ネクストジェネレーション), Nekusuto Jenerēshon) performed by Root Five.

== Episodes ==
No.	Title	Original release date
1	"The Life That Was Saved by Seiya! Revive, Legend of the Saints!"; Transliteration: "Seiya ga Sukutta Inochi! Yomigaere Seinto Densetsu!" (Japanese: 星矢が救った命！甦れ聖闘士（セイント）伝説！)	April 1, 2012
12 years after their victory against Hades, Saori Kidō still watches over the peace on Earth from Sanctuary as Athena and over a little baby. One day, the God of War, Mars, invades the Sanctuary. Seiya, the former Pegasus Bronze Saint and now the Sagittarius Gold Saint, comes to their rescue. Both powerhouses struggle to win as the baby observes them. 13 years later, the baby, now a young man named Kōga, is training to become a Saint by his teacher, the Ophiucius Silver Saint Shaina. However, he still has problems mastering his Cosmo. On the same island where Kōga is training, Saori is being cared for by her loyal butler, Tatsumi. Unfortunately, Saori harbors a wound she received from Mars 13 years ago when he fought Seiya. As she reacts to the wound, on the planet Mars, the God of War himself recovers from the wounds he suffered. While Kōga struggles to remember where he met Seiya, Saori gives Kōga a special necklace with a shiny stone. Just then, Mars returns, wanting to kidnap Saori and that's when Kōga discovers Saori is Athena. Mars' Darkness Cosmo reacts to Saori's wound and it begins to overpower her. Shaina tries to fight Mars, but she's no match for him and is defeated. Kōga steps up to try and save Saori and the necklace reacts to his Cosmo. The necklace, known as a Cloth Stone, is revealed to be Seiya's former Pegasus Bronze Cloth, which covers Kōga. After receiving encouragement from Seiya's spirit, Kōga burns his Cosmo and attacks with the Pegasus Meteor Fist.
2	"Departure! Saint of the New Generation!"; Transliteration: "Tabidachi! Shinsedai no Seinto!" (Japanese: 旅立ち！新世代の聖闘士（セイント）！)	April 8, 2012
Kōga awakens after he is saved by Shaina. While wondering where Saori is, he remembers fighting against Mars but was unable to land a successful blow. Saori is covered by darkness and disappears before everyone's eyes. Mars then unleashes a devastating blast, which Shaina saved Kōga from by shielding him. While Shaina receives medical care from Tatsumi, Kōga mourns Saori's disappearance. He then informs Shaina he is leaving on a trip to find Saori and defeat Mars. While on his journey, Kōga encounters another Bronze Saint, known as Lionet Sōma. During their journey, Sōma explains to Kōga about the different elements of Cosmo: Fire, Water, Earth, Thunder, Wind, Light and Darkness. Sōma possess the element of Fire in his Cosmo, and reveals that Seiya is known as a Legendary Saint after Kōga mentions the Pegasus constellation. After informing Sōma that Athena has been kidnapped, Kōga decides to join him on his journey to a place known as Palaestra, in order to find information. Kōga learns that Palaestra is a school for young people to become Saints and Sōma is one of its students. Later that night, both Saints are ambushed by a Martian, a minion of Mars, known as Mantis Ordykia. Sōma and Kōga don their Cloths and battle the Martian, but Kōga can't seem to burn his Cosmo, leaving Sōma to fight alone. Ordykia uses his Dark Mist, revealing a Darkness Cosmo, and attacks Sōma from the dark. Kōga, drawing on Sōma's earlier lesson, focuses every single point in his body and unleashes his Cosmo, revealing his element of Light. Sōma then defeats Ordykia with his Flame Desperado. The Martian runs away, only to be killed by another Martian. The next day, Kōga and Sōma finally arrive at Palaestra.
3	"The Law of the Mask! The Wind Saint Appears!"; Transliteration: "Kamen no Okite! Kaze no Seinto Arawaru!" (Japanese: 仮面の掟！風の聖闘士（セイント）現わる！)	April 15, 2012
At the entrance to Palaestra. Kōga encounters a masked female Bronze Saint named Aquila Yuna. He then witness a demonstration of her abilities. Suddenly, a teacher from Palaestra, the former Bear Bronze Saint Geki, makes himself known and escorts the Saints into the school. Kōga is enrolled into the school by the acting Headmaster, who informs him that Athena is in the Sanctuary. As Kōga gets to know Yuna, a bully they encountered earlier named Dorado Spear appears and challenges Kōga, while mocking Yuna's honor as a female Saint. Geki then appears and allows Yuna to fight Spear one-on-one. Both Saints are evenly matched, until Spear gains the upper hand. Kōga reminds Yuna she needs to follow her heart and find her own way to protect Athena. Yuna removes her mask and defeats Spear with her Divine Tornado. However, she decides to ignore the rules of the mask, to kill or love the man who sees her face. Kōga introduces himself to the students, and the Headmaster Ionia returns to Palaestra.
4	"The Son of a Hero! Ryuho Versus Kōga!"; Transliteration: "Eiyū no Musuko! Ryūhō tai Kōga!" (Japanese: 英雄の息子！龍峰対光牙！)	April 22, 2012
As Kōga tries to leave Palaestra, he encounters a young man, known as Dragon Ryūhō, a Water Cosmo user and son of Shunrei and the legendary Bronze Saint, Dragon Shiryū, whose Cloth Ryūhō has inherited. It's also revealed that the Hydra Bronze Saint, Ichi, is an active student in Palaestra, not having mastered his Cosmo nor his element yet. Ryūhō reveals to Kōga that before he was born, his father Shiryū lost all five of his senses in a battle. Ryūhō's reason to become a Saint is to save his father from his condition. Just then, Georges, a teacher, catches Kōga and Ryūhō outside and Ryūhō uses this opportunity to challenge Kōga to a fight, in order to test their abilities. Even though Ryūhō clearly has an upper hand in skill and technique, Kōga unleashes his Pegasus Flashing Fist. However, Kōga is defeated when Ryūhō uses his father's legendary technique, Rozan Rising Dragon. Ryūhō informs Kōga of the Saint Fight, a tournament in which the Palaestra Saints will compete in. The winner will become a Silver Saint and receive an audience with Athena.
5	"Selection Trials! Challenged in the Camp of Death!"; Transliteration: "Senbatsu Shiken! Kesshi no Kyanpu ni Idome!" (Japanese: 選抜試験！決死のキャンプに挑め！)	April 29, 2012
In preparation for the Saint Fight, Geki takes the students to a mountain named Cosmo Delta, which the Saints must scale before sunrise. Around the camp, there are plenty of traps that will decrease their Cosmos. It also serves as an elimination round for the tournament. Yuna teams up with Ryūhō to get through the mountain, while Kōga teams up with Sōma. A Saint known as Volans Argo starts mocking Sōma about his father, a Silver Saint who was killed in battle. Throughout the day, more and more Saints are drained of their Cosmo and are eliminated from the tournament. When Kōga and Sōma reach a raging river, Argo, whose element is Water, ambushes the two friends and throws Sōma into the river. Kōga dives in to save his friend but both fall over a waterfall. Later that night, Kōga and Sōma reach the shore and scale a mountain. There, Sōma sees his father's constellation, the Southern Cross, and remembers how a Martian killed his father. This explains his hatred of Martians. Both Saints then reach the final step, an eternal ice cliff. Yuna, Ryūhō, Argo and a few others were some of the first to make it. As Sōma and Kōga attack the cliff, their Cosmos is being drained. Sōma dons his Cloth and burns his Cosmo to destroy the icy cliff. Even though Sōma is weakened, Kōga carries his friend to the top, much to Argo's chagrin. Geki was aware of Argo's ambush and disqualifies him from participating in the Saint Fight. Geki then reveals the first person to make it to the top, Orion Eden.
6	"The Curtain Raises! The Saints Fight!"; Transliteration: "Kaimaku! Seinto Faito!" (Japanese: 開幕！聖闘士（セイント）ファイト！)	May 6, 2012
Kōga has a brief encounter with Eden, which lands him in the infirmary. Afterwards, he and his friends analyze facts about their elements and opponents prior to the Saint Fight while training for the battles ahead. The first day of the tournament has arrived. After Sōma's battle, it is Kōga's turn to fight his first opponent, Compass Hook, an Earth Cosmo user. Since Kōga is so focused on fighting Eden, he can't focus on dodging Hook's Ground Needle technique. With some encouragement from Sōma, Kōga gets his act together and focuses on the match at hand. With his Flashing Fist, Kōga claims victory. Later, Kōga and the other witness Eden easily winning his first match against Northern Crown Dali.
7	"The Fist of a Friend! Strike, Pegasus Meteor Punches!"; Transliteration: "Tomo no Kobushi! Ute, Pegasasu Ryūsei-ken!" (Japanese: 友の拳！打て、ペガサス流星拳！)	May 13, 2012
Thinking about the reasons Sōma and Ryūhō fight for, Kōga trains while figuring out why he fights. When Geki appears before him, he asks him about Seiya, and Geki reveals his determination and might throughout his battles, and his Pegasus Meteor Fist technique. The tournament round starts with Yuna fighting Delphinus Guney and his Delphinus Bomb. However, Yuna comes out on top with her Divine Tornado. Next up is Kōga vs. Sōma. Both friends are evenly matched, clashing with their techniques. After Sōma gains the upper hand with his new technique, Lionet Burning Fire, Kōga stands up, revealing his new technique, Pegasus Meteor Fist. This allows Kōga to win the match. As Ionia observes the match, he receives news: Athena has arrived at Palaestra.
8	"Fateful Meeting! The Smashing Gold Saint!"; Transliteration: "Shukumei no Deai! Shōgeki no Gōrudo Seinto!" (Japanese: 宿命の出会い！衝撃の黄金聖闘士（ゴールドセイント）！)	May 20, 2012
Eden defeats Apus Paradise with no effort, and Kōga goes to see Athena. However, he is attacked by the Martian Spider Ragno and his henchmen. Kōga kills the Martians, but when he reaches Athena, instead of Saori, he encounters a girl with Light Cosmo. Suddenly, Ionia appears, revealing himself as a follower of Mars with Darkness Cosmo, and the Capricorn Gold Saint. Meanwhile, Ryūhō and Yuna begin their match, being worried about Kōga's whereabouts as Eden is his next opponent. Kōga battles Ionia, but he's no match for the Gold Saint. Ionia, deciding to show his true powers, uses his Domination Language to control Kōga's body movements. He then uses his Darkness Cosmo to destroy the barrier at Palaestra. It is replaced by a Darkness Prison. Kōga later awakens in an underground jail guarded by Martians. In his cell, he encounters another Bronze Saint.
9	"The Crisis of Sanctuary! Dash, Ninja Saint!"; Transliteration: "Sankuchuari no Kiki! Ninja Seinto, Kakeru!" (Japanese: 聖域の危機！忍者聖闘士（セイント）、駆ける！)	May 27, 2012
As the Martians take over Palaestra, Kōga meets a Bronze Saint, who is also a Fuji Ninja, Wolf Haruto. Haruto was incarcerated because he also found out about Ionia's secret. Geki and the other Saints in Palaestra stand up to the Martians and begin to fight back. Ionia and the 'New Athena' meet with Mars as he absorbs her Light Cosmo and proceeds to destroy the Sanctuary. Haruto reveals to Kōga that Mars plans to steal the Cosmos of the captured Saints to use for his evil plans. Thanks to some clever planning, Haruto and Kōga escape their cell and save some Saints. Ryūhō, Sōma and Yuna decide to look for Kōga while he and Haruto try to make their way to the top. While the New Athena and Kōga connect with each other, he uses his Light Cosmo to break through the castle. However, they are ambushed by the Martian Stag Beetle Brothers. Left with no choice, Haruto equips his Cloth, and the two Bronze Saints each kill one of the Beetle brothers easily. Kōga and Haruto then reunite with Sōma, Ryūhō and Yuna. Geki tells the five Bronze Saints to believe in their powers and head to the Sanctuary while he holds off the Martians. Kōga decides to not only find Saori, but to rescue the New Athena.
10	"Suicidal Rescue! The Other Gold Saint!"; Transliteration: "Kesshi no Dakkan! Mō Hitori no Gōrudo Seinto!" (Japanese: 決死の奪還！もう一人の黄金聖闘士（ゴールドセイント）！)	June 3, 2012
Mars uses the New Athena's Cosmo to build his new base of operations, the Tower of Babel. Ionia places the New Athena on the center of the Tower to absorb the Cosmos throughout the world. The five Bronze Saints arrive at the Tower and form a strategy: Sōma, Haruto and Ryūhō distract the Martians while Yuna and Kōga find the New Athena. They find the New Athena, whose name is Aria. As the three escape, they find a light-filled column with all the Saints in Palaestra as its prisoners. Then they encounter the Leo Gold Saint, Mycenae. Since Aria escaped, the Tower of Babel stopped working, and the Saints tell Yuna to escape with Aria while they hold off Mycenae. The Gold Saint easily defeats Sōma, Haruto and Ryūhō, only Kōga remains standing after the brief duel. Just as Kōga begins burning his Cosmo to fight back, Mars appears before them and attacks Kōga, having felt his Cosmo. Before Kōga is defeated, Seiya's spirit appears to protect the Saints and their clash causes a huge explosion.
11	"Protect Aria! The Attack of Sonia, the Pursuer!"; Transliteration: "Aria o Mamore! Tsuisekisha Sonia no Shūgeki!" (Japanese: アリアを守れ！追跡者ソニアの襲撃！)	June 10, 2012
As Mars contemplates his plan, he sends his daughter, the High Martian Hornet Sonia along with the Silver Saints Crow Johann and Hound Miguel to find Aria. Meanwhile, Yuna and Aria are separated from their friends. The next day, Yuna senses the enemy and confronts them after hiding Aria. Sonia almost defeats Yuna but is requested to return to Mars' Tower. She leaves the rest to the Silver Saints. Sōma suddenly appears and recognizes Sonia as his father's assassin. Sōma and Yuna team up to fight Johann while trying to convince him they are not the enemy. While fighting, Yuna discovers a weak point in Johann's Wind Jammer. Just before Yuna faces certain defeat, Kōga returns to battle. He then uses his Pegasus Flashing Fist at Yuna's request and she uses her Aquila Spinning Predation to strike the weak point and defeat Johann. Before Miguel has a chance to attack, the three Saints and Aria escape and regroup. Aria mentions that they must go to five ruins and destroy their reactors so the Tower of Babel will no longer absorb the Cosmo on Earth. With Aria as their guide, Kōga and his friends begin their mission. Meanwhile, at the Tower of Babel, Mars accuses Kōga, Sōma, Yuna, Ryūhō and Haruto of being traitors and sends every Saint at his disposal to kill the Bronze Saints and bring Aria back.
12	"The Inherited Cosmo! Shun, the Legendary Saint!"; Transliteration: "Uketsugareru Kosumo! Densetsu no Seinto, Shun!" (Japanese: 受け継がれる小宇宙（コスモ）！伝説の聖闘士（セイント）、瞬！)	June 17, 2012
While travelling through the desert, Kōga and his friends are pursued by Miguel. They don their Cloths and begin their assault, but to no avail. Kōga tells Sōma and Yuna to take Aria to safety while he distracts Miguel. Before the Silver Saint has a chance to finish off Kōga, the legendary Bronze Saint Andromeda Shun appears, and orders Miguel go back to the Sanctuary before taking Kōga to a local village. Over the years, Shun has become a travelling doctor, treating people in need. Kōga reunites with Ryūhō, who was treated by Shun after collapsing in the desert following their fight against Mycenae. However, Shun harbors a Darkness wound like Saori and will die if he uses his Cloth. Kōga asks Shun for information. He reveals that when Mars first arrived on Earth, Seiya and his friends mounted an assault against him. Out of nowhere, a meteor fell to Earth and ended the battle. The blast not only changed the Cloths to Cloth Stones, but also allowed the Saints to harness the power of the elements. Mars, however, attacked again when Kōga was being raised by Saori. Seiya and his friends rose again to fight, and that's when Shun received the Darkness wound. Miguel shows up again, challenging Kōga and Shun, now confident since Shun can't wear his Cloth. Ryūhō gets up and joins Kōga in battle. Miguel overpowers all three Saints with his Earth Cosmo techniques. Shun sees Kōga's determination, identical to Seiya's. Despite his wound, he burns his Cosmo to use his most famous weapon, the Nebula Chain which grievously wounds Miguel. Still alive, he tries a final assault with the Hound Follow and Ryūhō blocks it with his Water Shield. He then counters with his Rozan Rising Dragon, and Kōga finally defeats Miguel with the Pegasus Meteor Fist, shattering his Silver Cloth in the process. Ryūhō stays behind with Shun to continue his recovery and Kōga leaves to catch up with his friends and reach the first of the ruins, the Wind Ruins. Before parting, Shun wishes him luck on his journey, recognizing him as the new Pegasus Saint of hope.
13	"Seiya's Message! To You, I Entrust Athena!"; Transliteration: "Seiya no Messēji! Omaetachi ni, Atena o Takusu!" (Japanese: 星矢のメッセージ！お前たちに、アテナを託す！)	June 24, 2012
Back at the Tower of Babel, Eden is revealed to be Mars' son and Sonia's brother. Also, the reason for his unmatchable skills is the training from his master, Mycenae. When he finds out about Aria's abduction, he swears to kill Kōga and the others in order to retrieve her. While on their journey, Kōga and his friends swear to save Athena and the world. Meanwhile, Saori is bound in a dark, secret location. Kōga and the others finally reach the Wind Ruins, covered by a powerful tornado. Yuna dons her Cloth and opens a path into the ruins, Kōga follows her shortly after. Inside, Yuna tries to destroy the reactor, but is ambushed and defeated by a grotesque figure, the overweight Silver Saint Musca Fly. Kōga confronts Fly and is affected by his Sand Virus. While waiting outside the tornado, Haruto appears before Sōma and Aria. Before Fly can finish off Kōga, Yuna saves her friend. While Fly attacks with his Fly Slider, Haruto and the others infiltrate the Ruins at the same time as Kōga kills Fly with his Pegasus Meteor Fist. Yuna, with Aria's Cosmo, destroys the Wind Reactor and emerging from it is the Pegasus Constellation, with a message from Seiya, entrusting them with saving Athena and defeating Mars. Yuna then receives the Cosmo Crystal of Wind resembling the Aquila.
14	"Reunion in My Homeland! The Mentor and Disciple Duel in the Snowfields!"; Transliteration: "Kokyō de no Saikai! Setsugen no Shitei Taiketsu!" (Japanese: 故郷での再会！雪原の師弟対決！)	July 1, 2012
The Bronze Saints reach a snow-covered land, which causes Yuna to reminisce about her days as a Saint apprentice and her mentor, the kind Silver Saint Peacock Pavlin. Sensing her mentor near, Yuna rushes to her encounter, only to realize Pavlin's allegiance is to Mars. Disciple and master engage in a fierce duel, later Yuna realizes it was Pavlin testing her, as her mentor reveals she is truly loyal to Saori, and informs Yuna she is still alive and being held hostage by Mars. As Yuna prepares to rejoin her fellow Bronze Saints, both female Saints are surrounded by the traitorous Silver Saints Sagitta Sham, Auriga Almaaz and Reticulum Balazo. Pavlin stays behind to cover Yuna's escape, seemingly losing her life.
15	"The Poisonous Fangs Approach! The Second Ruins Surrounded by Intrigue!"; Transliteration: "Semaru Dokuga! Inbō Uzumaku Dai-ni no Iseki" (Japanese: 迫る毒牙！陰謀うずまく第二の遺跡！)	July 15, 2012
The Bronze Saints manage to reach the Earth Ruins, however it is guarded by the Silver Saint Caelum Michelangelo and his Golems. Suddenly, they come across Ichi who managed to escape from Palaestra. The Saints decide to attack the ruins together, but it is revealed to be a trap Ichi has set up beforehand. He slashes Sōma and Yuna with a poisonous gauntlet before revealing his new Hydrus Silver Cloth. Ichi reveals that he betrayed them for the right to bear a Silver Cloth, lamenting that he could never be as good of a Saint as Seiya and the other legendary Bronzes. Pulling himself together, he accepts the challenge of Kōga while Sōma and Yuna fight hordes of golems summoned by Michelangelo's Colossus Live. However, Haruto finds the way into the ruins, and brings Aria with him. Down under the ground, Michelangelo decides to retreat once Haruto breaks through his golems. With the core to the Earth Ruins destroyed and the golems vanquished, Kōga finally overpowers and defeats Ichi's Hydrus Thousand Paralyze with his Pegasus Meteor Fist, opening his eyes and making him realize the error of his choices. Upon destroying the core, Haruto receives the Cosmo Crystal of Earth, resembling the Wolf.
16	"At the Star of Destiny's Side! The Way of Living of the Saints!"; Transliteration: "Unmei no Hoshi no Moto ni! Seinto-tachi no Ikiru Michi!" (Japanese: 運命の星のもとに！聖闘士（セイント）達の生きる道！)	July 22, 2012
Resuming their journey, the Bronze Saints eventually are tracked down by a small cadre of Martians. Running away from them to protect Aria, the teenagers reach a small but lively city, where Yuna fails to purchase a ship ticket as her purse fell during their escape. In order to raise money for ship fare, the Saints eventually find a job thanks to a kind old man who takes them to his wife's restaurant, where the youngsters prove they are not up to the challenge, much to the woman's chagrin. Later, the Martians are able to find the Saints and a fierce battle ensues. After achieving victory, the young Saints receive a resounding ovation from the crowd, and are given another chance at the restaurant.
17	"We Must Protect them! The Cloth Repairer and the Legendary Ore!"; Transliteration: "Mamorubekimono! Kurosu no Shūfukushi to Densetsu no Kōseki!" (Japanese: 守るべきもの！聖衣（クロス）の修復師と伝説の鉱石！)	July 29, 2012
The Bronze Saints arrive to a desert area, in which they meet a young girl from the people of Jamir, called Raki, who at first attacks them. After realizing they are Saints, by tradition connected to the people of Jamir, Raki takes them through a shortcut to avoid the desert areas, only to be greeted by the challenge of the Silver Saint Kerberos Dorie, who seeks to capture Aria. Managing to defeat Dorie after a difficult battle, the Bronze Saints resume their journey, bidding farewell to their young benefactor, who later is joined by her mentor, Kiki, the former apprentice of the legendary Gold Saint Aries Mu. Now a young man, Kiki realizes the Bronze Saints are the new embodiment of hope in this era.
18	"The Flames of Revenge! Souma, the Battle of Destiny!"; Transliteration: "Fukushū no Honō! Sōma, Innen no Tatakai!" (Japanese: 復習の炎！蒼摩、因縁の闘い！)	August 5, 2012
The Bronze Saints reach the Fire Ruins where Sōma finally comes across the murderer of his father, Hornet Sonia. Sōma engages in a violent battle with her but his anger continues to make him lose his own focus and is unable to hit her properly. The battle proves fruitless until Kōga manages to convince him to control his emotions. This allows Sōma to finally hurt Sonia for real and she escapes beaten. After stopping the ruins and receiving the Fire Cosmo Crystal resembling the Lionet, Sōma realizes that he cannot stay with the team until he has settled things with Sonia and departs on his own.
19	"The Secret of the Five Old Peaks! Pass It Down, Father, the Fighting Spirit of Shiryu!"; Transliteration: "Gorōhō no Himitsu! Keishōse yo, Chichi, Shiryū no Tōshi!" (Japanese: 五老峰の秘密！継承せよ、父、紫龍の闘志！)	August 12, 2012
After Sōma's fateful battle, the Bronze Saints reach the famed Lushan fairylands in China, and are rejoined by Ryūhō. Shortly afterwards, the teens suffer the assault of the ferocious Silver Saint Perseus Mirfak, who turns them to stone, with the exception of Ryūhō, who barely manages to defeat Mirfak, repeating the miraculous feat his father performed years ago, against Perseus Argol. Continuing their journey, the Saints trespass the Lushan waterfall with the help of the Libra Gold Cloth and destroy the core of the Water Ruins, where Ryūhō receives the dragon-shaped Water Cosmo Crystal. Shortly after, the Bronze Saints are greeted by the challenge of a mysterious young man named Genbu, who takes the Libra Gold Cloth as his rightful heirloom, and he reveals himself to be the Libra Gold Saint. At first deciding to join Kōga and Yuna on their journey, Ryūhō changes his mind and accompanies Haruto instead.
20	"For Aria's Sake! Eden's Wrathful Lightning Strike!"; Transliteration: "Aria no Tame ni! Eden, Ikari no Raigeki!" (Japanese: アリアのために！エデン、怒りの雷撃！)	August 19, 2012
Learning of Sonia's defeat, Eden leaves the Sanctuary in order to find Aria himself. He eventually manages to track Aria down, who is accompanied by Kōga and Yuna. After easily defeating Yuna, Eden and Kōga have their long awaited fight. However, the far more skilled and powerful Orion Saint easily dominates the battle despite Kōga's best efforts. Not wanting to see her friend hurt, Aria allows Eden to take her away.
21	"The Flightless Pegasus! The Journey Back From Defeat!"; Transliteration: "Tobenai Pegasasu! Sōshitsu kara no Tabidachi!" (Japanese: とべないペガサス！喪失からの旅立ち！)	August 26, 2012
Eden takes Aria away, while Yuna and Kōga resume their journey, demoralized by the failure to protect their friend. Along the way, Yuna and Kōga separate. Meanwhile, Eden and Aria reminisce about the happy days they shared during their childhood. Kōga later meets a mysterious man who first mocks his weakness, provoking the teen Saint into a fight. Kōga later realizes the man to be the owner of an immense Cosmo, and turns out to be Cygnus Hyōga, one of the legendary Bronze Saints who protected Earth from great menaces many years ago. Hyōga manages to teach Kōga that to reach the true potential of his Cosmo, he must first believe in himself. After learning Hyōga's lesson, Kōga rejoins Yuna and both resume their way with renewed resolve.
22	"Feelings Toward My Friends! The Pride of the Saints and the Way of the Shinobi!"; Transliteration: "Tomo e no Omoi! Shinobi no Michi to Seinto no Kyōji!" (Japanese: 友への思い！忍びの道と聖闘士（セイント）の矜持！)	September 2, 2012
Haruto, accompanied by Ryūhō, journeys to his home village in an attempt to come to terms with his past and regain his resolve. While there, Ryūhō learns that Haruto became a Saint in order to follow the footsteps of his good friend and older brother figure Yoshitomi, the previous Wolf Saint. Yoshitomi had apparently been murdered by a masked Silver Saint in front of Haruto and the boy had been desperate for answers ever since. Haruto's father, despite his disapproval of Haruto becoming a Saint, helps him gain back his fighting spirit by staging an assassination attempt on his son's life.
23	"Invading the Enemy Camp! Young Saints, Together Again!"; Transliteration: "Tekijin Totsunyū! Wakaki Seinto, Saishūketsu!" (Japanese: 敵陣突入！若き聖闘士（セイント）、再集結！)	September 9, 2012
The young Bronze Saints reunite before they decide to invade Mars' stronghold in order to rescue Aria. The teenagers carry out their plan, finding strong opposition in the enemy lines. During a moment of desperate need, the Bronze Saints receive the assistance of Sōma who rejoins them, stronger than before, thanks to further training under Jabu, the legendary Unicorn Bronze Saint. The Saints reach Aria's chambers, only to find she has left. Not all is lost, as Sōma is able to retrieve the Southern Cross Clothstone after defeating Sonia.
24	"Aiming for a Reunion! Let's Go to the Last Ruins!"; Transliteration: "Saikai o Mezashite! Ike, Saigo no Iseki e!" (Japanese: 再会を目指して！行け、最後の遺跡へ！)	September 16, 2012
Knowing of Aria's whereabouts, the Bronze Saints set off to invade the final ruins, followed by Shaina, who joins them. Before parting, Shaina reveals to Kōga the secret of his origin, as well as Aria's. Inside the ruins, the Bronze Saints face the threat of powerful Silver Saints, while Kōga engages Eden in a rematch to free Aria. Shaina takes Aria and with her help, they are able to vanquish Mars' dominion over the area, Eden taking the Thunder Cosmo Crystal resembling the Orion. Just then, Mars unleash his power in the Saints' direction, and the ruins begin to crumble. The Bronze Saints realize Mars' dark power is emerging from the debris of the structure, and everyone except Shaina is drawn into the darkness.
25	"Unknown Territory! The Moment of a Chance Meeting!"; Transliteration: "Michinaru Ryōiki! Meguriai no Toki!" (Japanese: 未知なる領域！めぐりあいの時！)	September 23, 2012
Yuna, Ryūhō and Haruto are transported to an unknown dark place and eventually reach a door, which they touch and are all transported to a world of memories. Yuna is on her hometown with her childhood friend before the war, Ryūhō is on his childhood on Palestra along with his then friend Lynx Mirapolos and Haruto faces his own brother Yoshitomi. All three realize the world they are in is an illusion created by the darkness in their hearts and are at first hesitant to battle, but manage to overcome the darkness and reach the Core of Darkness.
26	"Reminiscences and Revenge! The Trap of the Ruins of Darkness!"; Transliteration: "Tsuioku to Fukushū! Yami no Iseki no Wana!" (Japanese: 追憶と復讐！闇の遺跡の罠！)	September 30, 2012
Sōma and Sonia are entrapped in an illusion of their past when Sōma's father Southern Cross Kazuma was alive. Sonia is revealed to have been ordered by Medea to kill the Silver Saint, for he was an open leader against the Martians. Hesitant on her mission, she departs and faces Kazuma, as Sōma also witnesses the past event. Sonia is first easily pushed away by Kazuma who tells her that her fists are made to protect those she cares for, but when she thinks of her family, Sonia bursts into a rage and stabs Kazuma from the back. It is revealed then that after the murder, she was mentally tormented at the atrocity. Seeing her own hesitation, Sonia then sees her own darkness as Mars appears and deems her unworthy of being at his side. Sōma then appears and saves Sonia from the illusion as he wants to settle things himself. After defeating the darkness, the two reach the Core of Darkness. Eden, Aria and Kōga all face their respective darkness as well. Eden faces the guilt from an illusion of Aria scolding him for keeping her prisoner, Aria is confronted by her own darkness which claims she is just a tool, while Kōga's darkness reveals the true nature of his Cosmo to be Darkness.
27	"The End of the Journey! The Light of the Girl and the Youths!"; Transliteration: "Tabi no Shūen! Shōjo no Hikari to Wakamono-tachi!" (Japanese: 旅の終焉！少女の光と若者たち！)	October 7, 2012
Eden sees his own darkness as Aria is constantly being used by Mars without the power to do anything about it, before being confronted by his parents about his destiny for the new world. Accepting whatever punishment that would be suitable for his errors, Eden allows himself to succumb to his darkness. Meanwhile, tormented by her own darkness of being used as an instrument of destruction, Aria resolves to use her Light to protect those who need her, in doing so she reaches both Eden and Kōga from their darkness and all reach the Core of Darkness. Aria then allows Kōga to obtain the Core of Darkness. Mars himself then appears intending to take Aria for himself, but is faced with the opposition of the Bronze Saints and Aria herself who openly defies Mars. The Bronze Saints are easily defeated even after using their strongest attacks, but Aria resolves to fight and her Cosmo then resonates with the Elemental Cores merging together into a staff with which Aria can protect the Saints from Mars' Darkness as well as empower them. Mars is pushed back by Aria's light but then throws an energy lance and impales Aria. Mars then takes the staff along with Aria's light before departing with Sonia and a horrified Eden. A dying Aria asks the Saints to stop Mars and save the world, before being transported out of the Ruins with Aria's body falling into the abyss.
28	"The Strongest Army! The Gathering of the Gold Saints!"; Transliteration: "Saikyō no Gundan! Gōrudo Seinto Shūketsu!" (Japanese: 最強の軍団！黄金聖闘士（ゴールドセイント）集結！)	October 14, 2012
Seiya retells the latest events that have happened thus far from Kōga's birth to Aria's death at the hands of Mars. Once finished with the recap, Mars uses the staff of Aria to create a new Sanctuary, stretching up towards the sky from the Tower of Babel. At the Pope's Chambers, Ionia approaches Mars, announcing that the Gold Saints have gathered.
29	"The Beginning of a New Battle! The Zodiac Temples!"; Transliteration: "Aratana Tatakai no Makuake! Kōdōjūnikyū!" (Japanese: 新たな闘いの幕開け！黄金十二宮！)	October 21, 2012
After briefly mourning the death of Aria, and having been teleported to the stairs of the New Sanctuary, the Bronze Saints prepare to enter the Twelve Zodiac Temples. They are greeted by Aries Kiki, who explains Mars' ambitions, and the Bronze Saints realize that in order to defeat him, they must first pass through the twelve Houses of the Zodiac, each guarded by a Gold Saint. Just then, a large fire clock appears around the very top of the Sanctuary. Taking him for an enemy, Kōga attacks Kiki, to what he responds by restoring the Pegasus Cloth and also revealing to them the crucial secret of the Seventh Sense, the essence of Cosmo that all Gold Saints possess. Realizing Kiki is not an enemy, Kōga proceeds to the House of the Golden Bull, where he is challenged by its guardian, Taurus Harbinger, and a deadly battle ensues. Meanwhile, Kiki restores the remaining Bronze Cloths, and stays to battle alone against a large group of Martians, sending the teenagers ahead. Arriving at the second House, they witness Kōga fight back against Harbinger with the Pegasus Meteor Fist before the Gold Saint retaliates with the Great Horn technique, instantly defeating Kōga.
30	"Wondrous Power! The Taurus Saint!"; Transliteration: "Kyōi no Jitsuryoku! Kingyūkyū no Seinto!" (Japanese: 驚異の実力！金牛宮の聖闘士（セイント）！)	October 28, 2012
After the defeat of Kōga at the hands of Harbinger, the remaining Bronze Saints engage him in battle, meeting with utter defeat. Harbinger reminisces about his difficult childhood and what drove him to a life of violence, to become the strongest and eventually a Gold Saint. Managing to recover after witnessing the defeat of his comrades, Kōga attacks Harbinger with a single blow imbued with all the power of his Cosmo. Much to his surprise, Harbinger emerges unscathed and his comrades have vanished.
31	"The Crossroad of Fate! The Enigma of Gemini!"; Transliteration: "Unmei no Bunkiten! Sōjikyū no Nazo!" (Japanese: 運命の分岐点！双児宮の謎！)	November 4, 2012
Ryūhō arrives to the House of the Twins, being greeted by a strange, peaceful atmosphere and talking animals. Gemini Paradox, the guardian of the House, gently welcomes the young Saint for a cup of tea and exposes to him her motives for her allegiance to Mars, and reminisces about her past. Disagreeing with Paradox's amoral perspective, Ryūhō engages her in battle, managing to overpower the gentle Paradox. Much to his surprise, she emerges full of hate and with no trace of her previous loving personality, easily overpowering Ryūhō and knocking him unconscious. Meanwhile, Yuna arrives at the House of Cancer.
32	"The True Terror! The Unearthly Atmosphere of Cancer!"; Transliteration: "Makoto no Kyōfu! Kyokaikyū ni Tadayou Yōki!" (Japanese: 真の恐怖！巨蟹宮に漂う妖気！)	November 11, 2012
Yuna arrives at the House of Cancer, and she is greeted by the deathly atmosphere of the gates of Praesepe. The guardian of the House, Cancer Schiller, engages her in battle, reminiscing about his past and motives for his allegiance to Mars. Aiming for Yuna's utter defeat, Schiller tries to break her morale by toying with her psyche, having Yuna fight her deceased friends Arné and Komachi. Meanwhile, Kōga continues his battle with Harbinger. After another clash between the two Saints' greatest techniques, Kōga heads towards the exit. Admiring his determination, Harbinger lets Kōga go. Back at the House of Cancer, to avoid fighting her friends, Yuna tries to attack Schiller directly. However, she is hit by Schiller's ultimate move Praesepe Underworld Waves, which sends Yuna to a dark and barren land.
33	"The Essence of Cosmo! The Seventh Sense!"; Transliteration: "Kosumo no Shinzui! Sebun Senshizu!" (Japanese: 小宇宙（コスモ）の真髄！セブンセンシズ！)	November 18, 2012
Kōga arrives at the House of Gemini. He and Ryūhō join forces in order to defeat Paradox. Despite their best efforts, the two of them are outclassed by the more experienced warrior, especially when her darker half comes out to fight. Incensed by Paradox's selfish nature, Ryūhō manages to awaken the Seventh Sense and pull out a desperate win at the last minute with his Rozan Hundred Dragons. Ryūhō and Kōga then head off to the House of Cancer.
34	"The Threshold Between Life and Death! The Battle of the Underworld!"; Transliteration: "Seishi no Hazama! Meikai no Tatakai!" (Japanese: 生死の狭間！冥界の闘い！)	November 25, 2012
Because of Schiller's Praesepe Underworld Waves, Yuna leaves the earthly plane and finds herself in the deathly Hill to the Land of Spirits. Terrified by the sight of the souls of the deceased and visions of her sordid past, Yuna cowers until the arrival of Kōga, who suffered her same fate, and losing his temper due to Schiller's mockery of Aria's death, Kōga is consumed by the Darkness Cosmo inside him. Managing to calm Kōga down, Yuna engages the Cancer Gold Saint in battle once again, and drawing from her bonds to Aria and her comrades, she finally finds the strength to miraculously awaken the Seventh Sense, overpowers his Sekishiki Meikai Rinbu with her Aquila Shining Blast, and toss Schiller into a lake of boiling blood, killing him.
35	"The Fist of the Lion! Eden's Sorrowful Battle!"; Transliteration: "Shishi no Kobushi! Eden, Shōshin no Tatakai!" (Japanese: 獅子の拳！エデン、傷心の闘い！)	December 2, 2012
Following Schiller's defeat, the Bronze Saints prepare to proceed further into Sanctuary. Meanwhile, Eden reminisces about his late friend Aria. The grief-stricken Bronze Saint begins to question Mars' motives and their legitimacy, going as far as to challenge his master Mycenae because of his loyalty to Mars. Mycenae and Eden engage in unequal combat to prove their conviction.
36	"Sublime Pride! Mycenae's Kingly Fist!"; Transliteration: "Kedakaki Puraido! Mikēne, Ōja no Kobushi!" (Japanese: 気高きプライド！ミケーネ、王者の拳！)	December 9, 2012
After leaving Eden, Mycenae returns to guard his House, where Haruto and Sōma arrive promptly. The young Saints find themselves forced to fight their way through the House of Leo, but the ferocious Mycenae proves to be an almost impossible foe to overcome, even when the two teenagers fight him together and neutralize his King's Roar technique. When he unleash his King's Emblem, Haruto risks his life by stopping Mycenae's final attack. Sōma retaliates with a Lionet Bomber powerful enough to crack one of the shoulderpads on his Gold Cloth. The fierce determination of the young Saints makes Mycenae reminisce about his past and his pupil Eden, and deeming them true Saints, allows them to go through the House of Leo.
37	"The Unshakable Guardian! The Virgo Gold Saint!"; Transliteration: "Yuruginaki Shugosha! Barugo no Gōrudo Seinto!" (Japanese: 揺るぎなき守護者！乙女座（バルゴ）の黄金聖闘士（ゴールドセイント）！)	December 16, 2012
Upon arriving at the next House, Haruto and Sōma are confronted by Virgo Fudō, a Gold Saint whose power is greater than that of the others, despite not wearing a Cloth. Yuna, Kōga, and Ryūhō join the battle in time to save their friends from a crushing defeat. But even the combined powers of the five Bronze Saints is no match for Fudō. When he finally dons his Virgo Cloth to fight, all hope seems lost. However, Eden arrives at the last minute and protects them from one of Fudō's techniques.
38	"The Heroic Betrayal! Eden's Determined Fighting Spirit!"; Transliteration: "Yūkan naru Hangyaku! Eden, Ketsui no Tōshi!" (Japanese: 勇敢なる反逆！エデン、決意の闘志！)	December 23, 2012
Eden, now with white hair, takes over the fight against Fudō, blasting Kōga and the others out of the Virgo Temple. Following a desperate battle, Eden manages to defeat the Virgo Gold Saint after awakening the Seventh Sense, unleashing his Orion's Devastation. Meanwhile, as the other Bronze Saints move toward the next House, they are confronted by Tokisada, the former Horoglium Silver Saint promoted as the new Aquarius Gold Saint, and the man who killed Haruto's brother. His apparent ability to control time makes him a powerful adversary and Kōga is defeated with little effort.
39	"Reunion in Libra! Clash, Gold vs. Gold!"; Transliteration: "Tenbinkyū no Saikai! Gekitotsu, Gōrudo tai Gōrudo!" (Japanese: 天秤宮の再会！激突、黄金対黄金！)	January 6, 2013
Libra Genbu interferes in the battle between Tokisada and the Bronze Saints, teleporting everyone to his House. To the shock of the Bronze Saints, Genbu takes over the fight and declares his loyalty belongs to Athena, to Saori Kidō. While Tokisada is a powerful warrior, Genbu wins the fight due to possessing a greater skill. In a desperate gamble, Tokisada attempts a powerful technique to take the Bronze Saints with him but only manages to suck in Ryūhō and Haruto. Kōga, Sōma, and Yuna proceed to the next House with Genbu's blessing.
40	"Sonia's Resolution! The Chain of Fate Is Broken!"; Transliteration: "Sonia no Kakugo! Innen no Rensa o Tate!" (Japanese: ソニアの覚悟！因縁の連鎖を断て！)	January 13, 2013
The Bronze Saints finally arrive at the House of Scorpio, where they are confronted by Sonia, who has been given the Scorpio Gold Cloth by Medea. Tasked to teach Eden a lesson or eventually kill him, Sonia attacks and easily overpowers the Bronze Saints. Proceeding to kill Yuna, Sonia is challenged by Sōma who sends his friends ahead. Following a violent battle, Sonia is consumed by the Gold Cloth due to not mastering the massive Cosmo. Despite awakening his Seventh Sense, Sōma fails to save Sonia, and she is killed by her own failed technique.
41	"Tokisada's Ambition! The Champion of the End of Time!"; Transliteration: "Tokisada no Yabō! Jikan no Hate no Hasha!" (Japanese: 時貞の野望！時間の果ての覇者！)	January 20, 2013
Eden arrives at the House of Scorpio, watching Sōma right next to Sonia's body. Sōma apologizes to Eden before moving to catch up with Kōga and Yuna. Meanwhile, Haruto and Ryūhō awaken at the End of Time, finding themselves confronted by Tokisada, whose time-manipulating powers have regained their strength after his fight against Genbu. From the moment the battle begins, Tokisada easily gains the upper hand against the two Bronze Saints' combined strength. At the same time, Kōga and Yuna reach the House of Sagittarius, supposed to be protected by Seiya. Upon entering, they realize the House indeed is empty, due to Seiya missing. Inside, they find the original testament written by Aiolos. Acknowledging both Aiolos and Seiya as righteous Saints, Kōga and Yuna continue with a renewed resolve to save their goddess. Mycenae, now aware of the true culprit behind this battle, confronts Medea and prepares to kill her. However, her brother, the Pisces Gold Saint Amor, steps out of the shadows and kills Mycenae with a massive amount of Darkness Cosmo. In the End of Time, Haruto finally awakens his Seventh Sense and defeats Tokisada, leaving him to die as he and Ryūhō are teleported back to the House of Libra.
42	"The Traitorous Gold Saint! Ionia versus Kōga!"; Transliteration: "Uragiri no Gōrudo Seinto! Ionia tai Kōga!" (Japanese: 裏切りの黄金聖闘士（ゴールドセイント）！イオニア対光牙！)	January 27, 2013
Kōga and Yuna reach the House of Capricorn where they meet Ionia and learn from him his reasons for betraying Athena. Kōga attacks the former Headmaster of Palaestra, but is once again immobilized by his Domination Language technique, and his Darkness Cosmo is brought out. Before Yuna is able to help Kōga keep the Darkness Cosmo at bay, Ionia buries her in a rubble of books, facing Kōga alone. However, after succeeding to repress the Darkness Cosmo in his heart, Kōga awakens his Seventh Sense and finally kills Ionia with the legendary Pegasus Comet Fist.
43	"Resurrection of the War Gods! Break Into the Last Temple!"; Transliteration: "Gunshin Fukkatsu! Totsunyū, Saigo no Kyū!" (Japanese: 軍神復活！突入、最後の宮！)	February 3, 2013
The Bronze Saints finally arrive to the House of Pisces, guarded by the ruthless Amor. After separating Kōga and Yuna from the others, Amor summons Mars' strongest warriors, the Four Heavenly Kings to fight the others. While stating that the Heavenly Kings are stronger than the Gold Saints, Amor immobilizes Yuna, forcing her to watch her friends being attacked without resisting. Kōga, the only one capable of attacking, is restrained by Amor's Arrested Judgement, a special attack that can only be broken by Darkness Cosmo as part of Medea's plan to have him unleash the cursed power he keeps dormant within him. Kōga eventually forces himself into unleashing his Darkness Cosmo, in order to save Yuna from certain death.
44	"For My Friends! The Hidden Power in Koga!"; Transliteration: "Nakama no Tameni! Kōga ni Himerareshi Chikara!" (Japanese: 仲間のために！光牙に秘められし力！)	February 10, 2013
Kōga defeats one of the Heavenly Kings in one hit before he manages to once again keep his Darkness Cosmo due to him having reached his Seventh Sense earlier and Yuna calling out to him. Sending him ahead, Yuna engages Amor while Sōma, Ryūhō and Haruto engage the remaining three Heavenly Kings, using the last bit of strength they have left in order to finally defeat them. Leaving the rest to Kōga, they collapse to exhaustion. Amor decides to fight Yuna, but is interrupted by Eden who has arrived as well. Following a short fight, Yuna asks Eden to go onward and help Kōga while she handles Amor.
45	"The Malevolent War God! Mars and Ludwig!"; Transliteration: "Araburu Gunshin! Marusu to Rūdovigu!" (Japanese: 荒ぶる軍神！マルスとルードヴィグ！)	February 17, 2013
Kōga finally reaches Mars' location, determined to stop him. As the War God deflects his attacks and counterattacks, Eden arrives in time to save Kōga. Mars then reveals to them the true story from the days when he was known as Ludwig, a normal human who sought revenge for the death of his beloved wife, Misha. He deflects Eden's attacks before removing his mask, revealing himself as a human no longer.
46	"Koga and Eden! Young Cosmo, Slay the Darkneess!"; Transliteration: "Kōga to Eden! Wakaki Kosumo yo Yami o Ute!" (Japanese: 光牙とエデン！若き小宇宙（コスモ）よ闇を討て！)	February 24, 2013
Sending Kōga ahead, Eden awakens his Seventh Sense and challenges Mars, immobilizing him with his Cosmo. Eventually, while Kōga struggles to retrieve Aria's staff at the top of the Sanctuary, Mars breaks free and grievously wounds Eden, temporarily defeating him. Pursuing Kōga, Mars easily shrugs off any attack from the Pegasus Saint until Eden finally catches up to the two. Bringing their Cosmos to the limit, Kōga and Eden finally defeat Mars together and have Ludwig return to his senses. However, just as Ludwig is about to retrieve Aria's staff to prevent Earth's Cosmo from being drained, the time limit expires and the world's destruction begins, killing Ludwig.
47	"The Only Hope! A New Battlefield!"; Transliteration: "Wazukana Kibō! Aratanaru Tatakai no Chi!" (Japanese: わずかな希望！新たなる闘いの地！)	March 3, 2013
As Earth's Cosmo is transferred to planet Mars, Medea drains the Darkness Cosmo from Ludwig's body and transfers it to Amor, before she departs to Mars. After revealing all the suffering and prejudice he has suffered along with his sister during his childhood, Amor attacks Kōga. Eden joins Kōga against him, but when Amor transfers the battlefield to Mars, where his powers are increased to the same level as Mars possessed, Kōga finds on it an opportunity to retrieve Aria's staff and stop Earth's destruction.
48	"Gather, Friends! Kōga's Overflowing Cosmo!"; Transliteration: "Tomo yo Tsudoe! Kōga no Minagiru Kosumo!" (Japanese: 友よ集え！光牙のみなぎる小宇宙（コスモ）！)	March 10, 2013
After infusing the Darkness Cosmo in Kōga's body, Amor finds out that he was betrayed by his sister from the beginning and swears to kill everyone including her, knocking out Eden in the process. Meanwhile on Earth, Kiki, Harbinger, Fudō, and Genbu use their Cosmos to send Kōga's friends to Mars. As he finally reunites with Saori, Kōga is overcome by the Darkness Cosmo and possessed by the God of Darkness, Abzu, who kills Amor in one single blow. As the possessed Kōga now proceeds to kill Athena with his own hands, his friends try to have him return to his senses without success, until Eden stands in his way.
49	"The Ruler of Darkness! The Terror of Abzu!"; Transliteration: "Yami no Shihaisha! Apusu no Kyōfu!" (Japanese: 闇の支配者！アプスの恐怖！)	March 17, 2013
Eden tries to stop Abzu with no success until he gets the chance to obtain Aria's staff to confront him. Medea tries to dissuade him, but he refuses to comply and reclaims the staff by force. With Kōga's friends failing to get him back to normal despite everyone awakening their Seventh Sense, Eden eventually returns with the staff to the battle, just to find it destroyed by Abzu. Just as Eden is about to be dealt the final blow by the God of Darkness, Medea stands to protect her son, sacrificing herself for him. However, Eden is still dealt a heavy attack while the shards of Aria's staff fall down a cliff.
50	"Take it to Seiya! The Wish of the Young Saints!"; Transliteration: "Seiya ni Todoke! Wakaki Seinto-tachi no Negai!" (Japanese: 星矢に届け！若き聖闘士（セイント）達の願い！)	March 24, 2013
Yuna, the only one left standing after Abzu's terrifying onslaught against Kōga's friends, is encouraged by Athena to fight against Abzu in order to bring Kōga back. However, all her attempts fail, gaining her darkness wounds for each attempt. Just then, the fragments of Aria's staff combined with Kōga's friends' Cosmos awaken Seiya, who has been trapped in the depths of the red planet all this time, waiting for a chance to stop Abzu's plans. The Sagittarius Gold Saint confronts Abzu and manages to drive him from Kōga's body with aid from Yuna. The God of Darkness then flees away with Athena, and with Kōga's Pegasus Bronze Cloth shattered, Seiya lends the Sagittarius Gold Cloth to him and the young Saint rushes after Abzu to rescue her.
51	"Shine, Kōga! The Final Battle Between Light and Darkness!"; Transliteration: "Kagayake Kōga! Hikari to Yami no Saishū Kessen!" (Japanese: 輝け光牙！光と闇の最終決戦！)	March 31, 2013
Abzu tries to have Kōga under his control once again with no success and his attempt to kill Saori are stopped by his desperate efforts. Once feeling the radiance of his Cosmo, Kōga's friends send the last of their energies to assist him. Infused with the power of his companions and protected by Aria's light, Kōga manages to rescue Saori and destroy Abzu for good. As Earth regains the Cosmo that was siphoned from it, the planet returns to normal and the corruption that has spread into the Saints' bodies is washed away. After a brief encounter with Aria's spirit, Kōga returns to reunite with the others.
