= List of Digimon Beatbreak episodes =

List of anime episodes

Digimon Beatbreak (Japanese: デジモンビートブレイク, Hepburn: Dejimon Bītobureiku; stylized in all caps) is a Japanese anime television series produced by Toei Animation, part of the Digimon franchise. It is directed by Hiroaki Miyamoto, with series composition by Ryota Yamaguchi, with Takahiro Kojima as character designer and Arisa Okehazama composing the music. The series premiered on October 5, 2025, on Fuji TV and other networks, as part of the Anime Sunday 9 programming block.

The series ended on September 27, 2026 and was succeeded by a rebroadcast program for past entries in the series in its timeslot, which will be followed by a new Digimon anime series in 2027.

The series is simulcast on Crunchyroll worldwide (excluding Italy) and on Hulu in the United States. The first episode aired as an early preview during the Digimon Expo event on September 20. An English dub for the series premiered on Crunchyroll with its first five episodes on December 27, 2025. Episodes 6–10 was released on January 31, 2026. Dub batches of five episodes had been released every five weeks except for episodes 21–25 which was released two weeks later than usual, and episodes 41–45, which was released one week later than usual and episodes 46-49 which was released one week earlier. The English dub ended on November 21, 2026.

No episode aired on June 28, as the 2026 FIFA World Cup match between Portugal and Colombia was broadcast over the anime's timeslot.

This is a list of episodes featured in the series.

== Episode list ==
No.	Title	Directed by (Note: Production staff information is taken from the ending credits of each episode.)	Written by	Storyboarded by	Original release date	English release date
1	"The Beat of Emotions"; Transliteration: "Kanjō no Kodō" (Japanese: 感情の鼓動)	Hiroaki Miyamoto	Ryōta Yamaguchi	Hiroaki Miyamoto	October 5, 2025	December 27, 2025
In the Mirror World on May 17, 2050, bounty hunters led by Makoto Kuonji pursue thief Mitsuo Minezaki, whose Digimon FunBeemon is empowered by his e-Pulse, but Kyo Sawashiro ultimately intervenes and apprehends Mitsuo after defeating his Digimon. The following day, high school student Tomoro Tenma inadvertently causes malfunctions in his classmate Hitomi Shinomiya's Sapotama, later learning she has been afflicted by the Cold Heart phenomenon. As Tomoro grapples with guilt and the mystery behind his effect on Sapotamas, a Digimon named Gekkomon emerges and drains his e-Pulse, drawing him into a dangerous encounter with e-Pulse-feeding Hyemon. Tomoro's brother Asuka rescues him but is mortally attacked and consumed by Cold Heart, urging Tomoro to follow his own “beat” before falling away. Cornered and desperate, Tomoro agrees to share his e-Pulse with Gekkomon, forming a partnership that allows them to fight back against the Hyemon.
2	"Glowing Dawn"; Transliteration: "Gurōingu Dōn" (Japanese: グローイングドーン)	Yui Komatsu	Ryōta Yamaguchi	Yui Komatsu	October 12, 2025	December 27, 2025
After his brother's e-Pulse is drained by a Hyemon, Tomoro is forced to join Glowing Dawn, a group of Cleaners that handle Digimon incidents. He and Gekkomon are ambushed by the Kinoko Gang, a mushroom brother group, and their Digimon partners Mushroomon and Chamblemon, but luckily, Wolvermon and Chiropmon arrive to save them.
3	"Facing Mirrors"; Transliteration: "Awase-kagami" (Japanese: 合わせ鏡)	Kotoe Miki	Shō Aikawa	Kotoe Miki	October 19, 2025	December 27, 2025
Short on funds and food, Glowing Dawn seeks more bounties at Garando. They learn that the Gokuumon that deleted Hyemon Scar had not yet claimed the bounty, but Tomoro is incensed when the team turns down the chance to track down Hyemon Earring, who took Hitomi's Sapotama. He tracks Hyemon on his own but ends up pulled into the Mirror World to face his digivolved form, Fangmon. The team arrives to rescue him, but Tomoro and Gekkomon are driven into a berserk rage when the team tries to stop him from putting an end to the murderous Digimon. They are stopped at the last second, and the team is able to revive Hitomi by returning her Sapotama.
4	"Family"; Transliteration: "Famirī" (Japanese: ファミリー)	Kyōsuke Yamazaki	Natsumi Morichi	Kyōsuke Yamazaki	October 26, 2025	December 27, 2025
Glowing Dawn's next target is Machmon and their owner, who has been attacking cargo trucks. Kyo has put Reina in charge of the operation, but things go awry when Gekkomon goes against protocol, and Tomoro doesn't pay attention to his surroundings. Things get heated up between Tomoro and Reina, two people whose beats clash and yet are similar.
5	"Half and Half"; Transliteration: "Go-bu to Go-bu" (Japanese: 五分と五分)	Tohru Ishida	Masanao Akahoshi	Nobuo Tomizawa	November 2, 2025	December 27, 2025
During a shopping trip, Tomoro stumbles upon an old shopping street that a Pandamon protects. The ruthless Koala Kai attempts to evict the residents from their home, and Tomoro, and Gekkomon aid Pandamon in protecting the district.
6	"The Bond of Parent and Child"; Transliteration: "Oyako no Sakazuki" (Japanese: 親子の盃)	Takao Kiriyama	Masanao Akahoshi	Yukio Kaizawa	November 9, 2025	January 31, 2026
Pandamon is upset that Yuukari injured Sasatake, but he struggles to reconcile their emotions with their chivalric ideals. Tomoro wishes to engage Astamon in combat with the help of Reina, Makoto, and their Digimon, while Kyo looks into the identity of the leaker in the interim.
7	"Nirinso"; Transliteration: "Nirinsō" (Japanese: ニリンソウ)	Kazuho Takatoya	Toshiaki Satō	Kazuho Takatoya	November 16, 2025	January 31, 2026
Kyo has gone off somewhere without telling the younger members of Glowing Dawn. Meanwhile, Tomoro and the others need to find a bounty to pay repair costs for the microwave Tomoro accidentally broke. Their trip to locate Kyo soon leads them to a BlackGaogamon that seems to conflict with itself.
8	"The Vanishing Classroom"; Transliteration: "Kieru Kyōshitsu" (Japanese: 消エル教室)	Mashiro	Ryō Yamazaki	Mashiro	November 23, 2025	January 31, 2026
Hitomi encounters Tomoro again after a long time and asks him to help search for the missing students. They soon end up trapped by Mimicmon, who sought out students with the highest scores to eliminate them. Without Tomoro nearby, Gekkomon starts to struggle against this new enemy.
9	"Utopia"; Transliteration: "Risōkyō" (Japanese: 理想郷)	Yūichi Tsuzuki	Shō Aikawa	Yūichi Tsuzuki	November 30, 2025	January 31, 2026
The remaining members of Glowing Dawn head to the Shangri-La Egg, which turns out to be a utopia created after a big catastrophe. However, other Cleaners are also after GoldNumemon and Tomoro, and the others are ambushed by Shademon, who soon brainwashes Chiropmon.
10	"A True Friend"; Transliteration: "Hontō no Tomodachi" (Japanese: 本当の友達)	Tasuku Shimaya	Shō Aikawa	Tasuku Shimaya	December 7, 2025	January 31, 2026
Chiropmon is taken from Makoto by Haruko, who sees Digimon as toys. Kyo tries to interrupt the buyer's transaction, while Makoto feels troubled because his own weakness caused Chiropmon to suffer.
11	"A Black Emotion"; Transliteration: "Kuroi Kanjō" (Japanese: 黒い感情)	Gō Koga	Natsumi Morichi	Gō Koga	December 14, 2025	March 7, 2026
During a shopping trip to get his brother a birthday present, Tomoro gets into an argument with Gekkomon over a scarf. After separating from Tomoro, Gekkomon, whilst fueled by resentment and annoyance, comes across a Digimon who was spewing poisonous gas.
12	"A New Family"; Transliteration: "Atarashī Kazoku" (Japanese: 新しい家族)	Akihiro Nakamura	Toshiaki Satō	Akihiro Nakamura	December 21, 2025	March 7, 2026
Fuelled by guilt over what happened to Kyo and Gekkomon, Tomoro reflects on what he should do as a cleaner. Meanwhile, a dangerous Digimon called MarineBullmon is charging straight towards the Glowing Dawn base.
13	"Five Star Meeting"; Transliteration: "Gogyōsei Kaigi" (Japanese: 五行星会議)	Tohru Ishida	Ryōta Yamaguchi	Daiki Fukuoka	January 4, 2026	March 7, 2026
The Five Stars, the highest ranked cleaners of the world, have gathered to discuss an important matter; the rise of Cold Heart cases and the overwhelming appearances of Digimon. Meanwhile, the Glowing Dawn encounter a mysterious trio at a crime scene involving a fugitive.
14	"Tactics"; Transliteration: "Takutikusu" (Japanese: タクティクス)	Moe Maehara	Shō Aikawa	Moe Maehara	January 11, 2026	March 7, 2026
The Cleaner group called TACTICS Team Seven undergoes extreme training in order to control their e-Pulse. As they oppose Glowing Dawn during a hunt, their ideologies clash with Tomoro, who fails to accept them.
15	"Little Courage"; Transliteration: "Chīsana Yūki" (Japanese: 小さな勇気)	Junji Shimizu	Ryō Yamazaki	Junji Shimizu	January 18, 2026	March 7, 2026
The Kinoko Gang, holding a grudge, sneak into Nirinso in Kyo's absence and aim to destroy the team. RedVegimon neutralizes Gekkomon and the others, but the remaining In-Traning Digimon can only watch from the shadows.
16	"Where I Belong"; Transliteration: "Boku no ibasho" (Japanese: 僕の居場所)	Kazuya Hasegawa	Toshiaki Satō	Yukio Kaizawa	January 25, 2026	April 11, 2026
Granit interference causes Reina to let her target Manabu Akusana escape, and the two are transported to a frigid snowy mountain by the ability of Manabu's Digimon accomplice Moosemon. While searching for clues to escape despite their differences, Granit recalls the birth of Ludomon.
17	"Antipathy"; Transliteration: "Anchipashī" (Japanese: アンチパシー)	Kotoe Miki	Natsumi Morichi	Kotoe Miki	February 1, 2026	April 11, 2026
Glowing Dawn comes into conflict with TACTICS while pursuing Monmon. Hotaruko's younger siblings happen to be there and mistake Makoto for a colleague, inviting him to their family's okonomiyaki restaurant. During the meal, Hotaruko becomes hostile towards them, but food thefts are becoming more frequent in town.
18	"The Price of Freedom"; Transliteration: "Jiyū no daishō" (Japanese: 自由の代償)	Haruki Uneno	Masanao Akahoshi	Haruki Uneno	February 8, 2026	April 11, 2026
Tomoro and his friends feast on a pot while Haruomi is lying in front of a hideout, but TACTICS demands their extradition. Despite trying to stop it, Haruomi's Commandramon is captured. The man had a dark past.
19	"Black Market Auction"; Transliteration: "Yami Ōkushon" (Japanese: 闇オークション)	Mashiro	Masanao Akahoshi	Mashiro & Yukio Kaizawa	February 15, 2026	April 11, 2026
With Maki's help, Tomoro and his friends infiltrate an illegal Digimon auction being held by Klay Arslan of the Five Elements. While investigating the venue with TACTICS on guard, they come across a girl named Yume Ikuhara, and her partner Digimon Tinkermon imprisoned in a cage.
20	"Proof of Genius"; Transliteration: "Tensai no shōmei" (Japanese: 天才の証明)	Yui Komatsu	Shō Aikawa	Akira Kaga	February 22, 2026	April 11, 2026
Tomoro is kidnapped by a monkey Digimon and suddenly finds himself in a Hidden Coliseum in the Mirror World, where Digimon users are being forced to partake in illegal fighting. After winning his first match against Hirochi and his Greymon, Raito appears as his next opponent after he was fired for what happened to Tinkermon.
21	"The One Beside You"; Transliteration: "Soba ni Iru Mono" (Japanese: そばにいるもの)	Tohru Ishida	Toshiaki Satō	Yukio Kaizawa	March 1, 2026	May 30, 2026
Members of Growing Dawn rush to Tomoro's aid by infiltrating the Mirror World's Hidden Colosseum. Tomoro heads to the basement of the Colosseum to rescue Raito who has been taken away after Azhdarmon's defeat. Naito and the others stand in Kyo's way, but Reina notices something strange about Granit.
22	"Defiance"; Transliteration: "Hankōshin" (Japanese: 反抗心)	Kazuya Hasegawa	Natsumi Morichi	Toshinori Watanabe	March 15, 2026	May 30, 2026
Naito relentlessly pursues Kyo in order to fulfill Klay's wish. Meanwhile, Hotaruko is tormented by the order to eliminate the traitor. At that moment, Honoka of the Abyss, the Water Star and one of the Five Stars, appears and declares that she has come to hunt TACTICS.
23	"The Power to Take"; Transliteration: "Ubau Tame no Chikara" (Japanese: 奪うための力)	Daiki Fukuoka	Shō Aikawa	Daiki Fukuoka	March 22, 2026	May 30, 2026
Tomoro and his friends head to the Coliseum to rescue those who have been frozen. Klay is steadily making preparations to fulfill his own ambitions. Kyo and Murasamemon confront Proganomon, who is enveloped in an eerie light.
24	"Overlapping Beats"; Transliteration: "Kasanaru Kodō" (Japanese: 重なる鼓動)	Yūichi Tsuzuki	Ryōta Yamaguchi	Yui Komatsu	March 29, 2026	May 30, 2026
To save Kyo, Tomoro battles Klay. Overwhelmed by his immense power, the family is left defenseless and gets hurt. Consumed by rage and spiraling out of control, Tomoro is confronted by a genius who was once defeated.
25	"Half-Baked Hero"; Transliteration: "Han'ninmae no Hīrō" (Japanese: 半人前のヒーロー)	Haruki Uneno	Ryō Yamazaki	Hiroyuki Kakudō	April 5, 2026	May 30, 2026
On their way back to base, Tomoro and the others spend a brief vacation on a luxury liner, where they encounter the popular showman Handa and Starmon. To Makoto and Chiropmon, he is a legendary cleaner. Starmon takes on the modern day pirates who raid the luxury liner and are allied with a Petermon, but Makoto doesn't know that Handa got famous by accident for having "defeated" an Octomon and a Gesomon when it was actually a stray lightningbolt that did it. Now Makoto and Chiropmon must help Handa and Starmon defeat Petermon and the modern day pirates.
26	"The Taste of Guilt"; Transliteration: "Tsumi no aji" (Japanese: 罪の味)	Tasuku Shimaya	Masanao Akahoshi	Tasuku Shimaya	April 12, 2026	July 8, 2026
Haruomi was found collapsed in front of a nirinso flower. He was rescued by Kyo and Cougarmon and reunited with Commandramon, but he also encountered a weakened Elizamon. Commandramon and Elizamon, vying for the position of Haruomi's partner, are set up to settle their rivalry with a cooking battle at Gekkomon's suggestion.
27	"Wandering Love"; Transliteration: "Samayoeru ai" (Japanese: さまよえる愛)	Kazuho Takatoya	Kiriko Kobayashi	Kazuho Takatoya	April 19, 2026	July 8, 2026
Hitomi is reunited with Tomoro after a long time, but something seems off. A strange bandage wrapped around Hitomi causes Tomoro and the others to start showing affection towards the Digimon. Gekkomon and the others run away and call Maki for help as they discover that a Mummymon is responsible.
28	"GIFT"; Transliteration: "Gifuto" (Japanese: GIFT)	Toshihiro Kurata	Toshiaki Satō	Toshihiro Kurata & Akihiro Nakamura	April 26, 2026	July 8, 2026
Tomoro, who visits Asuka in the hospital, encounters a mysterious girl. To catch a serial killer who are targeting Digimon traffickers, Glowing Dawn heads to the hospital as well. What appears there is a support leader of GIFT named Hori whose obsessed with Digimon and her Digimon Jokermon with an abnormal fixation on deliveries.
29	"Dangerous Fandom"; Transliteration: "Kiken'na oshikatsu" (Japanese: 危険な推し活)	Mashiro	Yuki Tanihata	Hiroyuki Kakudō	May 3, 2026	July 8, 2026
In order to investigate the Digimon incident, Reina infiltrates a fan meeting of young actor Urato. There, she encounters Rose, a beauty evangelist and one of the Five Elements Stars. Rena is bewildered by the unfamiliar surroundings, but then Urato approaches her and reveals his true identity of Vamdemon.
30	"Wings to Protect You"; Transliteration: "Kimi wa mamoru tsubasa" (Japanese: 君を守る翼)	Kotoe Miki	Natsumi Morichi	Kotoe Miki	May 10, 2026	July 8, 2026
Glowing Dawn visits Shangri-La Egg again at the request of Makoto's father Seiji who is the President of Kuonji Industries. Makoto and Chiropmon's expressions are clouded as they listen to the testimony of Tsukasa, the younger twin brother of Makoto who is hospitalized. As they continue their investigation, the true motive of the culprits Riku Hosho and Loogarmon is revealed.
31	"One Step Forward"; Transliteration: "Fumidasu ippo" (Japanese: 踏み出す一歩)	Tohru Ishida	Masanao Akahoshi	Yukio Kaizawa	May 17, 2026	August 8, 2026
Tomoro encounters a reclusive girl named Chihiro on the beach who is accompanied by a Digimon named Algomon. Maki explains to Tomoro and his friends that there is an urgent matter: a very dangerous Digimon has appeared in the bay area. At that moment, two Cleaners that make up the Brilliant Thorn duo appear and approach Chihiro.
32	"Cold Rain"; Transliteration: "Tsumetai ame" (Japanese: 冷たい雨)	Daiki Fukuoka	Shō Aikawa	Daiki Fukuoka	May 24, 2026	August 8, 2026
Incidents occur where informants are successively turned into Cold Hearts by GIFT. Along with Maki, the next target, Tomoro and the others dash out of Garando. To settle the grudge with the opponent's Digimon Fumamon, Maki has a plan in mind. There is also a flashback to when Maki knew an IceLeomon until their encounter with Fumamon.
33	"Midsummer Ghost"; Transliteration: "Manatsu no bōrei" (Japanese: 真夏の亡霊)	Moe Maehara	Kiriko Kobayashi	Moe Maehara	May 31, 2026	August 8, 2026
Tomoro and friends visit the beach house run by Hotaruko. While enjoying the specialty Syakomon grill, they discover Raito and Monodramon collapsed at the water's edge. Although Raito leaves with a cold attitude, a black shadow watches his every move which leads to a confrontation with members of TACTICS Team One.
34	"Behind the Mask"; Transliteration: "Kamen no oku" (Japanese: 仮面の奥)	Kazuya Hasegawa	Ryō Yamazaki	Yukio Kaizawa	June 7, 2026	August 8, 2026
Tomoro devises a plan and catches the serial kidnapper. The next day while Tomoro is on the hospital rooftop with Asuka, Miharu appears. Sensing her strange presence, he inadvertently starts reminiscing about his memories with Asuka, when they receive news that the kidnapper has been released. Then Glowing Dawn must contend with the true culprit who is working with an Oblivimon on GIFT's behalf.
35	"Rampaging Instinct"; Transliteration: "Abareru hon'nō" (Japanese: 暴れる本能)	Tasuku Shimaya	Natsumi Morichi	Shinji Ishihira	June 14, 2026	August 8, 2026
Reina works hard in intensive training with Pristimon in order to look back on Rose. Meanwhile, a series of bombings targeting World Union-related facilities by GIFT occur. Lacking focus due to impatience, Reina becomes weak after letting her target Bombermon escape.
36	"Twisted Code"; Transliteration: "Yuganda kōdo" (Japanese: 歪んだコード)	Haruki Uneno	Toshiaki Satō	Shinji Nagata & Yukio Kaizawa	June 21, 2026	September 11, 2026
GIFT, which attacked Chairman Wong, begins a countdown directed at the entire world for its true purpose. Meanwhile, Tomoro encounters Miharu in the Mirror World while guided by Sapotama. Amid the battle, what emerges from the swirling dark clouds behind is Mephistomon.
37	"Kind Magic"; Transliteration: "Yasashī mahō" (Japanese: 優しい魔法)	Tohru Ishida	Masanao Akahoshi	Satoshi Itō	July 5, 2026	September 11, 2026
Tomoro and Rose storm the temple, the base of GIFT. Having seized control of the Shangri-La Egg system, Miharu takes the residents hostage and pressures Chairman Wong to reveal the Digimon. In response to Tomoro's questioning, Miharu begins to speak of her sister Chifuyu's wish.
38	"Hollow Thirst"; Transliteration: "Utsurona kawaki" (Japanese: 虚ろな渇き)	Toshihiro Kurata	Shō Aikawa	Toshihiro Kurata	July 12, 2026	September 11, 2026
Following Mephistomon's defeat and Miharu surrendering to the Ministry of Civil Protection, Tomoro and his friends secretly prepare a party for Kyo. Kyo spend a peaceful time reaffirming the bonds of family. Meanwhile, Kawarasaki receives word that a man had escaped from the detention center using a Digimon. This was when Kanchi Kishiwada was springing former Five Stars member Souji Kuroshio out of prison with a MarineDevimon that Souji is paired up with. In addition, he also gets paired up with Splashmon when Rose and Lilamon come looking for him.
39	"Lip Service"; Transliteration: "Kirei goto" (Japanese: きれいごと)	Kazuho Takatoya	Shō Aikawa	Hiroyuki Kakudō	July 19, 2026	September 11, 2026
Meto and Kanon launch a surprise attack on Glowing Dawn, targeting the bounty hunter Kyo Sawashiro who they assume was responsible for what happened to Rose. Meanwhile, Souji Kuroshio appears at Nirinso and threatens to destroy something important to Kyo in order to quench his own thirst, demanding that Kyo return to his old self as Souji attacks him and Murasamaon with MarineDevimon, Splashmon, and the brainwashed Lilamon.
40	"Unfading Night"; Transliteration: "Kesenai yoru" (Japanese: 消せない夜)	Yūichi Tsuzuki	Natsumi Morichi	Hiroaki Miyamoto	July 26, 2026	September 11, 2026
In light of recent events, Tomoro is surprised to learn the true identity of former Five Star Souji Kuroshio from Klay, but he reaffirms his resolve to bring Kyo back. Meanwhile, Kyo, heads to the battleground to settle things once and for all, reminisces about the days he spent at the observatory.
41	"A Golden Tomorrow"; Transliteration: "Ōgon no ashita" (Japanese: 黄金の明日)	Tasuku Shimaya	Ryōta Yamaguchi	Yukio Kaizawa & Daiki Fukuoka	August 2, 2026	October 24, 2026
At the site of the decisive battle, Tomoro and the others confront Souji, but they are forced into a tough fight against three Ultimate Level Digimon. Finally steeling his resolve, Kyo overpowers Souji. Tomoro raises the sole precept of the Glowing Dawn to try to stop Kyo, but...
42	"Sakura Friendship"; Transliteration: "Sakura no Yūjō" (Japanese: 桜の友情)	Kotoe Miki	Masanao Akahoshi	Kotoe Miki	August 9, 2026	October 24, 2026
Tomoro takes Kyo, who wants to see Asuka after a long time, to visit him in the hospital. On the way there, Kyo begins to talk about memories of Asuka that Tomoro didn't know about. Hidden within these stories was the secret of Cougarmon's birth. Meanwhile, Kishiwada gives the White Core to Chairman Wong to further the Shangri-La Project that involves making use of Asuka.
43	"The White Digimon"; Transliteration: "Shiroki Dejimon" (Japanese: 白きデジモン)	Kazuya Hasegawa	Toshiaki Satō	Kazuya Hasegawa	August 16, 2026	October 24, 2026
Tomoro is bewildered by the sudden appearance of Asuka and his partner Digimon HeliosBoamon as Glowing Dawn works to survive against the attack. A flashback revealed how Asuka nearly lost control of HeliosBoamon when a criminal and his Kuwagamon abducted Tomoro and also featured Kyo working with Kaito to rescue Tomoro. Meanwhile, Kishiwada appears in Abraxas where he has been appointed as the new Earth Element Star. What is the final piece needed for the Shangri-La Project...?
44	"The Strongest Man"; Transliteration: "Saikyō no otoko" (Japanese: 最強の男)	Moe Maehara	Yuki Tanihata	Hiroaki Miyamoto	August 23, 2026	October 24, 2026
What appeared before Kyo and the others, who were rushing to rescue Tomoro, was Kaito who had come to settle things once and for all. Kyo and Murasamemon face off against Kaito and Flaremon. Due to the division, Reina faces off against Honoka and MarineChimairamon and Makoto faces off against Kanada and an experimental Gogmamon that he received from the World Union. Accompanied by intense pulsations, Flaremon is enveloped in light, and Kaito, in pursuit of ultimate strength, grins fearlessly...
45	"Big Brother, Little Brother"; Transliteration: "Ani to otōto" (Japanese: 兄と弟)	Kazuho Takatoya	Natsumi Morichi	Kazuho Takatoya	August 30, 2026	October 24, 2026
Determined to bring back Asuka, who has lost his will, Tomoro and his family confront HeliosBoamon, but Kaneda and Gokuwmon suddenly intervene. Tomoro is forced into a defensive position, but what is Kaneda's true purpose even when Asuka has Heliosboamon Digivolve to his next form...?
46	"Glitch"; Transliteration: "Bagu" (Japanese: バグ)	Daiki Fukuoka	Shō Aikawa	Daiki Fukuoka	September 6, 2026	November 21, 2026
Following Murasamemon's death, Tomoro awoke in the Nirinso with his face showing grief, anguish and remorse and the news about Mursamemon's death brought a low morality in Glowing Dawn as Tomoro's grandfather Tasuku resurfaces in the Ministry of Civil Defense's custody working on a project with Miharu. Meanwhile, Chairman Wong declared that he would eliminate the bugs known as Digimon and deliver an ideal world. This causes Kaito, Honoka, and Rose to resign from the Five Stars. At the same time, Senka Ninshino has taken Rose's place and attacks the Nirinso with a charged-up Brachiomon, Triceramon, and Vermilimon. Now Glowing Dawn must come together to defeat the three charged-up Dinosaur Digimon.
47	"The Ultimate Power"; Transliteration: "Kyūkyoku no chikara" (Japanese: 究極の力)	Haruki Uneno	Masanao Akahoshi	Satoshi Itō & Yukio Kaizawa	September 13, 2026	November 21, 2026
Glowing Dawn infiltrates Abraxas to save Asuka. With the help of his comrades, Tomoro arrives only to be confronted by Chairman Wong and Genjo Kanada. Monarchlizamon clashes fiercely with his sworn enemy Gokuwmon. Tomoro's failed attempt to rescue Asuka also led both him and Chairman Wong to discover a dark secret....Genjo is actually an insidious Digimon named Sanzomon, she and her colleagues Kanchi and Senka (who are revealed to be the human forms of Sagomon and Cho-Hakkaimon) were using both Wong and the Glowing Dawn as pawns to further their greedy and extremely selfish agenda to conquer all of Earth.
48	"Two Beats"; Transliteration: "Futatsu no Kodo" (Japanese: 二つの鼓動)	Yui Komatsu	Toshiaki Satō	Yui Komatsu	September 20, 2026	November 21, 2026
After Sanzomon finally reveals her true form and identity, she makes an annoucement to all of humanity and horribly begins absorbing e-pulses from the majority of humanity in order to create her ideal Digimon utopia. Tomoro recovers from his cold-heart condition, and with renewed determination and support from Kyo, Tomoro and his friends confront SeitenGokuumon to rescue both Gekkomon and Asuka. Tomoro manages to rescue Gekkomon with help from Pristimon's and Chiropmon's Mega-Level Forms Artiomon and Nosferamon. Now he now comes face-to-face with Sanzomon.
49	"A World of Shining Light"; Transliteration: "Hikari kagayaku sekai" (Japanese: 光輝く世界)	Hiroaki Miyamoto	Masanao Akahoshi & Ryōta Yamaguchi	Hiroaki Miyamoto	September 27, 2026	November 21, 2026
Tomoro Tenma and Asuka Tenma face their final battle for a new future for both humans and Digimon. However, they find themselves in a desperate situation against the overwhelming power of SeitenGokuwmon who reveals he wants revenge against humanity for the torment that brought upon both him and his kind and he reveals that Sanzomon rescued him and others. In addition, Sanzomon Cold-Hearted and impersonated the real Genjo upon her first arrival on Earth. After SeitenGokuwmon strikes on both Atratusmon and Albatusmon, Reina and Makoto along with the others come to Tomoro's and Asuka's aid and reveal their positive emotions. Atratusmon's Sapotama emits an intense light that resurrects Chamblemon, Tinkermon, and Murasamemon. Atratusmon and Albatusmon DNA Digivolve into Volvemon and manage to destroy SeitenGokuwmon (yet sparring the three Digimon he fused into himself) and weakens Sanzomon. Afterwards, Sanzomon reluctantly admits defeat and allows humans and Digimon to co-exist peacefully while vowing to watch from beyond before disappearing. Months later, Tomoro's parents are released from custody, while Kuonji Industries along with the Ministry of Civil Protection (renamed the Ministry of Digimon) begin to help and support the harmony between humans and Digimon, with Glowing Dawn supporting them.

== See also ==
- List of Digimon Beatbreak characters
