= List of Digimon Beatbreak characters =

Digimon Beatbreak (Japanese: デジモンビートブレイク, Hepburn: Dejimon Bītobureiku; stylized in all caps) is a Japanese anime television series produced by Toei Animation, part of the Digimon franchise. It is directed by Hiroaki Miyamoto, with series composition by Ryota Yamaguchi, Takahiro Kojima as character designer, and Arisa Okehazama composing the music. The series premiered on October 5, 2025, on Fuji TV and other networks, as part of the Anime Sunday 9 programming block.

The series will end on September 27, 2026 and be succeeded by a new Digimon anime series in 2027.

The series is simulcast on Crunchyroll worldwide (excluding Italy) and on Hulu in the United States. The first episode aired as an early preview during the Digimon Expo event on September 20.

No episode aired on June 28, as the 2026 FIFA World Cup match between Portugal and Colombia was shown instead.

This is a list of characters featured in the series.

== Glowing Dawn ==
The main characters belong to a group known as Glowing Dawn (グローイングドーン, Gurōingu Dōn). Glowing Dawn was initially going to be named Golden Dawn (ゴールデンドーン, Gōruden Dōn), but the name was changed a month before the series officially aired. It was also revealed that Glowing Dawn has been active since 2048.

Tomoro Tenma (天馬 トモロウ, Tenma Tomorō)
Voiced by: Miyu Irino, Sakura Kawaguchi^{Ep. 2 credits} (young) (Japanese); Zeno Robinson (English)
Tomoro Tenma is a teenage boy characterized by his distinctive appearance, critical outlook, and a rare e-Pulse that disrupts Sapotamas and attracts Digimon. Ostracized from a young age due to these differences, he grows up relying on his close bond with his older brother Asuka. Asuka was subjected to Cold Heart, a condition caused by Digimon draining e-Pulse that can render the victim comatose. After their parents are arrested and executed by the World Union under unusual and mysterious circumstances, Tomoro becomes distrustful of authority and artificial intelligence, sympathizing with Digimon who are treated as "glitches" by society. His life changes when he partners with Gekkomon and becomes involved with the group Glowing Dawn, gradually learning to trust others, confront his resentment and past, and accept both his abilities and himself.
Gekkomon (ゲッコーモン, Gekkōmon)
Voiced by: Megumi Han (Japanese); Risa Mei (English)
A gecko-like Digimon and Tomoro's partner. He emerges from Tomoro Tenma's Sapotama, initially attacking him to claim his e-Pulse before forming an unstable partnership. Though openly motivated by his desire for Tomoro’s e-Pulse, Gekkomon repeatedly protects him in battles against Hyemon and other threats, displaying notable speed and strength. Over time, he becomes involved with Glowing Dawn, where his gluttony and impulsive behavior—such as stealing food and causing chaos—contrast with moments of loyalty and concern for Tomoro. Despite their frequent clashes and mutual distrust, Gekkomon gradually settles into the group as Tomoro’s partner, accompanying him on missions and daily life while maintaining his mischievous, self-serving nature. Gekkomon's Fresh form is Kekomon (ケコモン, Kekomon). He can also Digivolve into the Champion level armadillo girdled lizard-like Armalizamon (アルマリザモン, Arumarizamon), the Ultimate level armored Giganotosaurus-like Monarchlizamon (モナークリザモン, Monākurizamon), the Mega level black-cloaked knight/reptilian humanoid-like Atratusmon (アトラタスモン, Atoratasumon), and can DNA Digivolve with Albatusmon into the evolution-like Volvemon (ヴォルブモン, Volvemon).
Reina Sakuya (咲夜レーナ, Sakuya Rēna)
Voiced by: Tomoyo Kurosawa (Japanese); Cristina Vee (English)
Reina Sakuya is a teenage girl noted for her striking red-orange hair, green eyes, and bold fashion sense. A self-described "loose cannon" of Glowing Dawn, she frequently charges into the front lines to draw enemy attention, often exhausting her e-Pulse in the process. It was also revealed that, when she was young, she had no family for unknown reasons. Despite her reckless tendencies, she is deeply loyal to the group, whom she regards as her family after being transferred between multiple Cleaner teams. Outside of combat, Reina enjoys almond jelly and collecting plush toys, and harbors a strong dislike of snakes.
Pristimon (プリスティモン, Purisutimon)
Voiced by: Mutsumi Tamura (Japanese); Lily Emil Lammers (English)
A Pristinailurus-like Digimon and Reina's partner. Pristimon has a big sister personality and grew up with Reina from a young age. She likes black tea and its fragrance, but dislikes strong perfumes. Pristimon's Fresh form is Pafumon (パフモン, Pafumon), who sports an ahoge. She can also Digivolve into the Champion level wolverine-like Wolvermon (ウルヴァモン, Uruvamon), the Ultimate level binturong-like Bearcatmon (ベアキャットモン, Beakyattomon), and the Mega level Artio-like Artiomon (アルティオモン, Artiomon).
Makoto Kuonji (久遠寺マコト, Kuonji Makoto)
Voiced by: Arisa Sekine (Japanese); Brenna Larsen (English)
Makoto Kuonji is a young boy with blond hair and blue eyes who serves as Glowing Dawn's primary analyst, handling reconnaissance and logistical tasks often avoided by his teammates. Born in the Shangri-La Egg to a wealthy family, he was suddenly cast out due to his partnership with Chiropmon. Quiet and introspective, Makoto views himself as physically weaker and emotionally reserved compared to others, but ultimately comes to accept these traits as part of his identity, embracing Chiropmon as a reflection of his true self.
Chiropmon (キロプモン, Kiropumon)
Voiced by: Misaki Kuno (Japanese); Courtney Shaw (English)
A bipedal hooded vampire bat-like Digimon and Makoto's partner. Chiropmon has an otaku personality and is not satisfied until he checks out anything that catches his eye. Chiropmon's Fresh form is the slime-like Zurumon (ズルモン, Zurumon), who has a bat symbol on its head. He can also evolve into the Champion level humanoid vampire bat/cyborg-like NightChiropmon (ナイトキロプモン, Naitokiropumon), the Ultimate level vampire bat/fighter aircraft-like ScourgeChiropmon (スカージキロプモン, Sukājikiropumon), and the Mega level vampire-like Nosferamon (ノスフェラモン, Nosferamon).
Kyo Sawashiro (沢城キョウ, Sawashiro Kyō)
Voiced by: Yōhei Azakami (Japanese); Jalen Askins (English)
Kyo Sawashiro is a young man and the founder and leader of Glowing Dawn, as well as a former member of the elite Five-Stars. A prodigy Cleaner and longtime friend of Asuka Tenma, he is known for his calm demeanor and strong sense of familial loyalty, referring to his friends and companions as his "family." Unlike most Cleaners, Kyo seeks coexistence between humans and Digimon, secretly protecting apprehended Digimon at the Nirinso Shelter rather than handing them over for deletion. His compassion comes at a personal cost, as he regularly uses his own e-Pulse to sustain them, leaving him physically weakened despite his fondness for cooking, sewing, and domestic life. During the fight with a brainwashed Asuka, Kyo loses his left hand to Gokuumon.
Murasamemon (ムラサメモン)
Voiced by: Daiki Hamano (Japanese); Cory Yee (English)
An Ultimate Level humanoid leonine-like Digimon and Kyo's partner, who wields a sword with a cougar-shaped hilt. He primarily appears in his Champion Level, the maned Turkestan lynx-like Cougarmon (クーガモン, Kūgamon), while resting. His Fresh form is the dandelion-like Popomon (ポポモン, Popomon), his In-Training form is the frill-necked cat-like Frimon (フリモン, Furimon), his Rookie form is the lion cub-like Liollmon (フリモン, Furimon), and his Mega Level form is the four-armed leonine-like Habakirimon (ハバキリモン, Habakirimon).

== World Union ==
The World Union (ワールドユニオン, Wārudo Yunion) is a powerful organization that is the largest corporation in the world.

Chairman Wong (王会長, Ō Kaichō)
Voiced by: Akio Otsuka (Japanese); Christopher Swindle (English)
A Chinese man who is a leading member of the Ministry of Civil Protection, the chairman of the World Union, and the main antagonist of the series. During the Kano Island Incident, he and his partner Dr. Tasuku Tenma discovered an energy source which led to said incident. Wong was Cold Hearted by Sanzomon.
Chifuyu Kagemori (影森 チフユ, Kagemori Chifuyu)
Voiced by: Saori Hayami
A systems engineer who performs adjustments on the Sapotama's A.I. system. She committed suicide after her plans to introduce the Digimon as the bringers of wonder failed.

=== Ministry of Civil Protection ===
The Ministry of Civil Protection (国民保護省, Kokumin Hogo Shō) is a government organization that works for the World Union. They have the authority to interfere with the police if they get in the way. By the final episode, the Ministry of Civil Protection becomes the Ministry of Digimon.

Kawarazaki (河原崎, Kawarazaki)
Voiced by: Yūya Uchida (Japanese); Keith Silverstein (English)
A worker at the Ministry of Civil Protection who speaks on their behalf. He considers Digimon to be a glitch.

== Cleaners ==
The Cleaners (クリーナー, Kurīnā) work for the Ministry of Civil Protection. They are charged with the duty of rounding up rogue Digimon and the humans who are harboring them.

=== Solo Cleaners ===
The following Cleaners are not affiliated with any faction:

Haruko Yamada (山田 ハルコ, Yamada Haruko)
Voiced by: Hitomi Owada
A young Cleaner who wears a red Gothic Lolita dress.
Shademon (シェイドモン, Sheidomon)
A multi-eyed shadow-like Digimon who is Haruko's partner.
Sunny Yamada (山田 サニー, Yamada Sanī)
Voiced by: Yoshimitsu Shimoyama
Haruko's father. His attempt to get into the High-End Block by committing fraud got his family kicked out of Shangri-La Egg Hikarigahama East and his criminal record kept him from obtaining a job. When Haruko became a Cleaner, Sunny joined her as a Cleaner while viewing Digimon as tools. Sunny was apprehended by Kyo and handed over to the Ministry of Civil Protection, causing Haruko to return to her mother.
Haruomi Sone (曽根 ハルオミ, Sone Haruomi)
Voiced by: Koki Uchiyama
A Cleaner who deserted TACTICS.
Commandramon (コマンドラモン, Komandoramon)
Voiced by: Daisuke Sakaguchi (Japanese); Chris Hackney (English)
A commando/dragon-like Digimon who is Haruomi's Digimon partner. His Fresh form is the cherry bomb-like Bommon (ボムモン, Bomumon).
Elizamon (エリザモン, Erizamon)
Voiced by: Naomi Ōzora (Japanese); Marissa Lenti (English)
A frilled lizard-like Digimon who becomes Haruomi's second Digimon partner.
Handa (半田, Handa)
Voiced by: Sōichirō Hoshi
A Cleaner and actor who works in a Tokusatsu show. He became a legendary Cleaner when he supposedly took down an Octomon and a Gesomon, when they were actually struck by a stray lightning bolt. He would later help his fan Makoto when the ship they were working on is attacked by modern day pirates who are allied with a Petermon.
Starmon (スターモン, Sutāmon)
Voiced by: Takeshi Kusao
A star/space warrior-like Digimon who is Handa's partner.

=== Kinoko Gang/Nirinso Defense Force ===
The Kinoko Gang (キノコ団, Kinoko Dan) are a gang of Cleaners operating in the bay region of the city who target low bounty Digimon. They later take up the name of the Nirinso Defense Force (ニリンソ防衛隊, Nirinso bōei-tai), who served as commentators for the cooking contest between Commandramon and Elizamon and later watch over Nirinso.

Shiitake (シイタケ, Shiitake)
Voiced by: Yūsuke Numata
A member of the Kinoko Gang.
Shimeji (シメジ, Shimeji)
Voiced by: Yasuhiro Takato
A member of the Kinoko Gang.
Eringi (エリンギ, Eringi)
Voiced by: Yoshiyuki Kōno
A member of the Kinoko Gang.
Chamblemon (シャンブルモン, Shanburumon)
A champignon-like Digimon resembling a recolored version of Mushmon who is Shitake's partner.
Mushmon (マッシュモン, Masshumon)
Two mushroom-like Digimon who are Shimeji and Eringi's partners.
RedVegiemon (レッドべジーモン, Reddobejīmon)
Voiced by: Eiji Takemoto
A vegetable-like Digimon that becomes Shitake's second Digimon partner following Chamblemon's deletion.

=== Five Stars ===
The Five Stars (五行星, Gogyōsei) are five elite Cleaners who answer to Chairman Wong and work as enforcers to the World Union. Kyo Sawashiro and Murasamemon used to be part of the group. Among its members are:

Genjo Kanada (金田ゲンジョウ, Kanada Genjō) / Sanzomon (サンゾモン, Sanzomon)
Voiced by: Hiroshi Kamiya (Japanese); Jonathon Ha (English)
A member of the Five Stars with the Gold Star rank who is loyal to Chairman Wong and orchestrates indirect confrontations through his subordinate Gokuumon. Kanada is later revealed to be Sanzomon, a Digimon resembling Tang Sanzang who Cold-Hearted and impersonated the real Genjo Kanada.
Gokuumon (ゴクウモン, Gokūmon)
Voiced by: Kazuhiro Yamaji^{Ep. 2 credits}
A Sun Wukong-like Digimon who is Genjo's partner. Gokuumon's Rookie form is the golden snub-nosed monkey/François' langur-like Kakamon (カカモン, Kakamon). He can DNA Digivolve with Sagomon and Cho-Hakkaimon to form the Śrāvaka-like SeitenGokuumon (セイテンゴクウモン, SeitenGokūmon).
Kanchi Kishiwada (岸和田カンチ, Kishiwada Kanchi) / Sagomon (サゴモン, Sagomon)
Voiced by: Ryōtarō Okiayu
Kanchi Kishiwada is Miharu's second-in-command of GIFT who secretly works for Wong. For unknown reasons, he possesses supernatural abilities, such as Cold Hearting humans to silence them and possessing aquakinesis. Kanchi is later revealed to be Sagomon, a Digimon resembling Sha Wujing.
Senka Nishino (西野 センカ, Nishino Senka) / Cho-Hakkaimon (チョ・ハッカイモン, Cho Hakkaimon)
Voiced by: Megumi Toyoguchi
A woman loyal to Chairman Wong who first appeared as a nurse to tell Tomoro that Asuka was transferred. She succeeds Rose following Rose's resignation. Senka is later revealed to be Cho-Hakkaimon, a Digimon resembling Zhu Bajie.
Kaito Kutsuna (忽那カイト, Kutsuna Kaito)
Voiced by: Yuichi Nakamura (Japanese); Paul Castro Jr. (English)
A member of the Five Stars with the Fire Star rank who employs vicious tactics. After learning of Chairman Wong's true motives, Kaito resigns from the Five Stars. By the final episode, Kaito started dating Honoka.
Flaremon (フレアモン, Fureamon)
Voiced by: Hisao Egawa^{Ep. 11 credits}
A fire lion-like Digimon who is Kaito's partner. Flaremon's Mega Form is the Apollo/fire lion-like Apollomon (アポロモン, Aporomon).
Honoka Sakai (沙海ホノカ, Sakai Honoka)
Voiced by: Rie Kugimiya (Japanese); Kira Buckland (English)
A member of the Five Stars with the Water Star rank who is the youngest of the group. After learning of Wong's true motives, Honoka resigns from the Five Stars. By the final episode, Honoka started dating Kaito.
MarineChimairamon (マリンキメラモン, Marinkimeramon)
Voiced by: Takako Honda (Japanese); Jalen Askins (English)
A marine chimera-like Digimon who is Honoka's partner.
Rose Woodville (ローズ・ウッドヴィル, Rōzu Uddoviru)
Voiced by: Ryoko Shiraishi (Japanese); Tara Sands (English)
A member of the Five Stars with the Wood Star rank. She is a fortune-teller by trade, being into fine arts and disliking static. After learning of Wong's true motivations, Rose resigns.
Lilamon (ライラモン, Rairamon)
Voiced by: Shino Shimoji (Japanese); Brittany Lauda (English)
A humanoid lilac-like Digimon who is Rose's partner.
Klay Arslan (クレイ・アルスラン, Kurei Arusuran)
Voiced by: Satoshi Mikami (Japanese); Christoper Swindle (English)
A successful businessman, philanthropist, prince of Albida, and member of the Five Stars under the Earth Star rank, who is the oldest of the group and supervisor of the TACTICS teams. Klay is also revealed to be the owner of the Mirror World's Hidden Colosseum, where illegal Digimon fights occur. After Genjo leaked his deeds even after destroying the Hidden Colosseum, Klay loses his Earth Star rank and becomes a fugitive.
Proganomon (プロガノモン, Puroganomon)
Voiced by: Kohsei Hirata
A Proganochelys-like Digimon with drills on its shell who is Klay's partner. His Fresh form is the sand-like Sandmon (スナモン, Sunamon) and his Mega form is the pyramidion-like Pyramidimon (ピラミディモン, Piramidimon). He was defeated by Monarchlizamon and De-Digivolves to Sandmon.
Gogmamon (ゴグマモン, Gogumamon)
An experimental Gogmagog/mineral-like Digimon that Kanchi received from the World Union.
Brachiomon (ブラキモン, Burakimon)
A Brachiosaurus-like Digimon who accompanied Senka in attacking Nirinso.
Triceramon (トリケラモン, Torikeramon)
A Triceratops-like Digimon who accompanied Senka in attacking Nirinso.
Vermilimon (ヴァーミリモン, Vāmirimon)
A Monoclonius-like Digimon who resembles a recolored Monochromon. It accompanied Senka in attacking Niriso.
SkullMeramon (デスメラモン, Desumeramon)
A humanoid fire Digimon who accompanied Kanchi in fighting Glowing Dawn.
BlueMeramon (ブルーメラモン, BurūMeramon)
A blue fire spirit-like Digimon who accompanied Kanchi in fighting Glowing Dawn.
Monzaemon (もんざえモン, Monzaemon)
A teddy bear-like Digimon who accompanied Senka in fighting Glowing Dawn.
WaruMonzaemon (ワルもんざえモン, WaruMonzaemon)
A wicked teddy bear-like Digimon who accompanied Senka in fighting Glowing Dawn.
ExTyrannomon (エクスティラノモン, Ekusutiranomon)
A plush Tyrannosaurus-like Digimon who accompanied Senka in fighting Glowing Dawn.

=== TACTICS ===
TACTICS is a global militaristic Cleaner Group working for Klay Arslan of the Five Stars. Among its members are:

Raito Souda (惣田ライト, Souda Raito)
Voiced by: Toshiyuki Toyonaga (Japanese); Ryan Colt Levy (English)
A smart and resentful teenage boy who is a member of TACTICS Team Seven. Raito is fired for causing the deletion of Tinkermon and placed in the Hidden Colosseum, where he attempts to redeem himself. Raito would later assist in the fight against Sanzomon.
Monodramon (モノドラモン, Monodoramon)
Voiced by: Wataru Hatano (Japanese); Paul Castro Jr. (English)
A dragon-like Digimon with bat-like wings on its arms who is Raito's partner. His Digivolved forms include the Champion level Rhamphorhynchus-like Rhamphomon (ランフォモン, Ranfomon) and the Ultimate level Azhdarchidae-like Azhdarmon (アズダルモン, Azudarumon).
Hotaruko Kanuma (鹿沼ホタルコ, Kanuma Hotaruko)
Voiced by: Sakura Kawaguchi (Japanese); Anairis Quiñones (English)
A hard-working member of TACTICS Team Seven. She likes okonomiyaki and cleaning and hates large dogs. Hotaruko leaves TACTICS amidst Klay's coup on Chairman Wong and later participates in the fight against Sanzomon.
Shakomon (シャコモン, Shakomon)
Voiced by: Misaki Watada (Japanese); Kira Buckland (English)
A clam-like Digimon who is Hotaruko's partner. She can Digivolve into the Champion level Tylosaurus-like Tylomon (ティロモン, Tiromon).
Granit (グラニット, Guranitto)
Voiced by: Marina Inoue (Japanese); A. J. Beckles (English)
A calm and pessimistic teenage boy who is a member of TACTICS Team Seven. Granit leaves TACTICS amidst Klay's coup on Chairman Wong and later participates in the fight against Sanzomon.
Ludomon (ルドモン, Rudomon)
Voiced by: Yuko Sanpei (Japanese); Jonathon Ha (English)
A Digimon of the Legend-Arms group and Granit's partner who can transform into a shield. He can Digivolve into Champion level TiaLudomon (ティアルドモン, Tiarudomon).
Seraphy Naito (セラフィ内藤, Serafi Naitō)
Voiced by: Ryōta Takeuchi (Japanese); Craig Lee Thomas (English)
A member of TACTICS Team Seven and the oldest of the group. He is also the right-hand man of Klay Arslan.
Gigasmon (ギガスモン, Gigasumon)
Voiced by: Uoken (Japanese); Jonathon Ha (English)
A troll/giant-like Digimon who is Seraphy's partner.
Ichinosuke (一之助, Ichinosuke)
Voiced by: Kazuyuki Fukigawa
A member of TACTICS Team One.
Vulturemon (バルチャモン, Baruchamon)
Voiced by: Daisuke Kishio
A humanoid vulture-like Digimon armed with a sniper rifle who is Ichinosuke's partner.
Nichika (にちか, Nichika)
Voiced by: Ai Maeda
A member of TACTICS Team One.
Sealsdramon (シールズドラモン, Shīruzudoramon)
Voiced by: Tomohisa Hashizume
A dragon/SEAL-like Digimon who is Nichika's partner.
Sanpei (さんぺい, Sanpei)
Voiced by: Yudai Mino
A member of TACTICS Team One.
Hi-Commandramon (ハイコマンドラモン, Haikomandoramon)
Voiced by: Taro Yamaguchi
A high tech dragon/commando-like Digimon who is Sanpei's partner.

=== Brilliant Thorn ===
Brilliant Thorn (ブリリアントソーン, Buririanto Sōn) are a duo of Cleaners who work for Rose Woodville.

Meto Enishida (金雀枝 メト, Enishida Meto)
Voiced by: Hibiku Yamamura
A female member of Brilliant Thorn.
Pomumon (ポームモン, Pōmumon)
Voiced by: Misa Watanabe (Toropiamon)
A pitaya/Archaeopteryx-like Digimon who is Meto's partner. His Ultimate level form is the tropical plant-like Toropiamon (トロピアモン).
Kanon Tsuwabuki (石蕗 カノン, Tsuwabuki Kanon)
Voiced by: Yū Shimamura (Japanese); Marissa Lenti (English)
A female member of Brilliant Thorn.
Aruraumon (アルラウモン, Aruraumon)
Voiced by: Michie Tomizawa
A mandrake-like Digimon with a reptile-like tail who is Kanon's partner and resembles Palmon. Its Ultimate level form is the olea-like Oleamon (オウリアモン, Ōriamon).

=== GIFT ===
GIFT is an extremist cult that seeks to dismantle the corrupt World Union and rebuild the world using the World Code. GIFT was originally started as a simple greeting application until Chifuyu Kagemori left.

Miharu Kagemori (影森 ミハル, Kagemori Miharu)
Voiced by: Ayane Sakura (Japanese); Tiana Camacho (English)
Miharu Kagemori is a 13-year-old girl who is the leader of GIFT and the sister of Chifuyu. She is shown to have an interest in Tomoro and wants him to join her side. When GIFT's plot is thwarted, Miharu is arrested by the Ministry of Civil Defense. Chairman Wong announced that Miharu would be granted clemency. She was later placed in the Ministry of Civil Defense's special ward where she worked with Tasuku Tenma on a spray that would disconnect the e-Pulse from the Sapotama.
Mephistomon (メフィスモン, Mefisumon)
Voiced by: Urara Takano
A Mephistopheles-like Digimon who is Miharu's partner. His Champion-level form is the wizard-like Wizardmon (ウィザーモン, Wizāmon)
Hori (堀, Hori)
Voiced by: Yuuki Yamamoto (Japanese); Cat Protano (English)
A serial killer and member of GIFT who targeted a shipping mogul and a Digimon trafficker. She was arrested by the Ministry of Civil Protection.
Jokermon (ジョーカーモン, Jōkāmon)
Voiced by: Mitsuo Iwata (Japanese); Luis Bermudez (English)
A jester-like Digimon and Hori's partner.
Riku Hosho (宝生リク, Hosho Riku)
Voiced by: Shunsuke Kanie (Japanese); Daniel Walton (English)
A member of GIFT and a former worker at Kuonji Industries. He was arrested by the Ministry of Civil Protection.
Loogarmon (ルガルモン, Rugarumon)
Voiced by: Takahiro Miyamoto
A werewolf-like Digimon and Shunsuke's partner. His Ultimate level form is the hellhound-like Helloogarmon (ヘルガルモン, Herugarumon).
Yao (ヤオ, Yao)
Voiced by: Yusuke Handa
A member of GIFT with a fixation on aliens who kidnapped female Mitsutama workers and demanded an exorbitant ransom in exchange for their return. He was arrested by the Ministry of Civil Protection.
Oblivimon (オブリビモン, Oburibimon)
Voiced by: Honoko Mitsubashi (MetalKoromon)
A UFO-like Digimon who is Yao's partner.
Sana Tsujimine (辻峰サナ, Tsujimine Sana)
Voiced by: Shiori Izawa (Japanese); Anjali Kunapaneni (English)
A member of GIFT who was committing serial bombings on World Union facilities while passing it off as artwork. She was arrested by the Ministry of Civil Defense.
Bombermon (ボマーモン, Bomāmon)
Voiced by: Yu Kobayashi
A humanoid bomb-like Digimon who is Sana's partner.

== Owners ==
The Owners are people who possess a Digimon. Any people who are caught for owning a Digimon and do not join the Cleaners mostly turn to a life of crime.

Asuka Tenma (天馬 アスカ, Tenma Asuka)
Voiced by: Kazuya Nakai, Ryōsuke Kanemoto (adolescent), Mie Sonozaki (young) (Japanese); Chris Hackney (English)
Asuka Tenma is the older brother of Tomoro, who was close to him ever since their parents were taken by the Ministry of Civil Protection. His Sapotama gave birth to HeliosBoamon, which later turned into a White Core and disappeared. After Gekkomon was born, Asuka worked to protect Tomoro from Hyemon Scar and was Cold Hearted as a result. He was sent to the World Union General Hospital to recuperate. Though Asuka later came out of his Cold Heart state, the tainted e-Pulse that HeliosBoamon consumed caused him to become a puppet of Wong. He is later freed from the control and assists in battling Sanzomon.
HeliosBoamon (ヘリオスボアモン, Heriosuboamon)
Voiced by: Yukana
A boa constrictor-like Digimon who was Asuka's partner. She turned into a White Core and disappeared. HeliosBoamon was later found by Kishiwada and sent after Tomoro. Her Mega form is the white-cloaked knight/reptilian humanoid-like Albatusmon (アルバタスモン, Arubatasumon) which can DNA Digivolve with Atratusmon to form Volvemon.
Hitomi Shinomiya (篠宮 ヒトミ, Shinomiya Hitomi)
Voiced by: Minami Tsuda (Japanese); Courtney Shaw (English)
A former classmate of Tomoro Tenma who was once Cold Hearted by Hyemon Pierce. By the end of the series, her Sapotama produces a Digimon thanks to Atratusmon's ePulse.
Cutemon (キュートモン, Cutemon)
A rabbit-eared fairy-like Digimon that hatched from Hitomi's Sapotama thanks to Atratusmon's ePulse.
Mitsuo Minezaki (峰崎 ミツオ, Minezaki Mitsuo)
Voiced by: Takayuki Kondo
A professional thief. He was defeated by Kyo and handed over to the Ministry of Civil Protection.
FanBeemon (ファンビーモン, Fanbīmon)
Voiced by: Sakura Kawaguchi
A bee-like Digimon who is Mitsuo's partner. His Champion level form is the wasp-like Waspmon (ワスプモン, Wasupumon). It was defeated by Murasamemon, regressing to Pupumon.
Hajime Hikita (疋田 ハジメ, Hikita Hajime)
Voiced by: Masamu Ono (Japanese); Kellen Goff (English)
A 10th-Grade student who seeks to earn a spot in the Shangri-La Egg. He was spared from arrest by Tomoro.
Mimicmon (ミミックモン, Mimikkumon)
Voiced by: Ami Matsushima (Japanese); Alan Lee (English)
A mimic-like Digimon born from Hajime's Sapotama. It was defeated by Gekkomon, regressing to Kuramon, but not before being taken by Ministry of Civic Publication.
Izumi (イズミ, Izumi)
Voiced by: Ami Matsushima (Japanese); Tara Sands (English)
A masked woman who plotted to target a fake Sapotama and gets away due to Kyo's interference. Izumi later becomes a leading member of Klay Arslan's Digimon trafficking operation, and is arrested by the authorities after Glowing Dawn interferes.
Komondomon (コモンドモン, Komondomon)
Voiced by: Daisuke Yokoyama (Japanese); Jalen Askins (English)
A vehicular Komondor-like Digimon who is Izumi's partner.
Hosoda (細田, Hosoda)
Voiced by: Taro Yamaguchi
A man who despairs over his kids being taken away by his wife. He is rescued from Raremon by Glowing Dawn.
Raremon (レアモン, Reamon)
Voiced by: Joichiro Ohtsuki (Japanese); Kellen Goff (English)
A flesh blob-like Digimon who was born from Hosoda's Sapotama. He takes him hostage before being deleted by Flaremon.
Bomber (爆弾魔, Bakudanma)
Voiced by: Masaya Onosaka
A man who takes his frustration out on the world by bombing things. He is accidentally hit by BomberNanimon's bombs and arrested by TACTICS.
BomberNanimon (ボンバーナニモン, Bonbānanimon)
Voiced by: Takashi Matsuyama
A Tamagotchi/bomb-like Digimon who assists the Bomber in bombing things. He is defeated by Armalizamon, regresses to the bomb-like Bommon (ボムモン, Bomumon), and taken by TACTICS. BomberNanimon and Bomber are later seen as part of Klay Arslen's Digimon trafficking operation.
Hayato Sunayama (隼人砂山, Sunayama Hayato)
A man who was Cold Hearted by his Digimon.
Snimon (スナイモン, Sunaimon)
Voiced by: Ryosuke Asano
A mantis-like Digimon who turned against Hayato by Cold Hearting him. After TACTICS Team Seven lure Snimon into Cold Hearting a boy, Snimon Digivolves into the scorpion-like SkullScorpionmon (スコピオモン, Sukopiomon). It is defeated by Armalizamon, regressing to Pabumon.
Manabu Akasaka (赤坂 マナブ, Akasaka Manabu)
Voiced by: Yuga Sato
A jewel thief who hid his loot in the snowy mountains. He was apprehended by Glowing Dawn while his Digimon partner escapes. Manabu later confesses to his crimes, which led Kawarazaki to learn about Klay Arslen's Hidden Colosseum.
Moosemon (ムースモン, Mūsumon)
Voiced by: Jalen Askins
A moose-like Digimon who is Manabu's partner.
Yume Ikuhara (幾原 ユメ, Ikuhara Yume)
Voiced by: Koyori Hakui
A young girl who Glowing Dawn rescued from a Digimon trafficking operation.
Tinkermon (ティンカーモン, Tinkāmon)
Voiced by: Koyori Hakui
A Tinker Bell-like Digimon who is Yume's partner. She and Yume were rescued from a Digimon trafficking operation, but was killed shortly afterward. She was resurrected by Altratusmon near the end of the series.
Hirochi (ヒロイチ, Hiroichi)
Voiced by: Kohsuke Tanabe
A man who is a fighter in Klay Arslen's Hidden Colosseum. He and his Digimon were defeated by Tomoe and Armalizamon and were dragged away by Arslen's men. Hirochi was later found Cold Hearted.
Greymon (グレイモン, Gureimon)
A horned dinosaur-like Digimon who is Hirochi's partner.
Chihiro (チヒロ, Chihiro)
Voiced by: Hina Kino
A young girl who became a recluse due to the amount of bullying she received at her grade school. This lasted until she met Argomon.
Argomon (アルゴモン, Arugomon)
An Argus Panoptes-like Digimon who befriends Chihiro and helped her gain the courage to leave her house.
Souji Kuroshio (黒潮 ソウジ, Kuroshio Souji)
Voiced by: Shin-ichiro Miki
A former Five Stars member who was known for replacing his Digimon by having the stronger succeeding Digimon consume their predecessor like he did with Scorpion. During his time as a Five Stars member, he developed a deadly obsession with Kyo. Souji's companion Piranimon was killed by Murasamemon, after which Souji was arrested for murder and robbery and imprisoned. Some time later, Kanchi Kishiwada sprung Souji from prison by sneaking a Digimon into his cell. He was given the White Core by Kishiwada. Kyo and Habikirimon defeat his Digimon and apprehend Souji while Kishiwada makes off with the White Core.
Scorpiomon (アノマロカリモン, Anomarokarimon)
An Anomalocaris-like Digimon who was one of Souji's earlier partners. He later had Scorpiomon eaten by Piranimon.
Piranimon (ピラニモン, Piranimon)
A piranha-like Digimon who was Souji's earlier partners. He had Piranimon eat Scorpiomon. In a confrontation with Kyo, Piranimon was deleted by Murasamemon.
MarineDevimon (マリンデビモン, Marindebimon)
Voiced by: Yasunori Masutani
An aquatic devil/squid-like Digimon who was used by Kishiwada to free Souji from prison. It was first seen as the zooplankton-like Pichimon (ピチモン, Pichimon) when Kishiwada snuck it into Souji's prison to spring him out. MarineDevimon's In-Training form is the aquatic dinosaur-like Bukamon (プカモン, Pukamon), his Rookie form is the crab-like Crabmon (ガニモン, Ganimon), and his Champion form is the squid-like Gesomon (ゲソモン, Gesomon). It was defeated by Habikarimon and regresses into Pichimon.
Splashmon Darkness Mode 2 (スプラッシュモンダークネスモード, Supurasshumondākunesumōdo)
Voiced by: Masaya Takatsuka
A watery tiger-like Digimon who becomes Souji's second Digimon partner. It was defeated by Monarchlizarmon, regressing back to Botamon.

=== Koala Kai ===
Koala Kai (孤荒会, Koara-kai) is an Owner criminal organization. They caused trouble stealing Sapotamas and demolishing locations around Hikarigahama East Shopping Street before being bested by Pandamon with help from Glowing Dawn.

Keisuke Yuukari (遊狩 ケイスケ, Yuukari Keisuke)
Voiced by: Mitsuaki Madono (Japanese); Mick Lauer (English)
The crime boss of Koala Kai.
Astamon (アスタモン, Asutamon)
Voiced by: Hiroki Takahashi (Japanese); Kellen Goff (English)
An Astaroth-like Digimon who is Keisuke's partner. He was defeated by Pandamon and Gekkomon and regressed to the smoke-like Mokumon (モクモン), who is placed in the Nirinso Shelter.
Nogi (野木, Nogi)
Voiced by: Ryōhei Arai
A Digimon Owner who was hired by Koala Kai to steal Sapotama Collectors. He is defeated by Glowing Dawn and arrested by the Ministry of Civil Protection.
Machmon (マッハモン, Mahhamon)
Voiced by: Nobuyuki Hiyama
A motorcycle-like Digimon who is Nogi's partner. It was defeated by Gekkomon and reverts back to MetalKoromon.
Machida (待田, Machida)
Voiced by: Masato Sugiyama
A Digimon Owner who was hired by Koala Kai to demolish the locations around Hikarigahama East Shopping Street. He flees after Gekkomon and Pandamon defeat his Digimon.
Kenkimon (ケンキモン, Kenkimon)
A heavy equipment-themed Digimon who is Machida's partner. After being defeated by Gekkomon and Pandamon, Kenkimon regresses to the bomb-like Bommon (ボムモン, Bommon) and is deleted by Astamon when he attacked Gekkomon and Pandamon.

== Other humans ==
Tasuku Tenma (天馬タスク, Tenma Tasuku)
Voiced by: Kenyu Horiuchi
A scientist who is the grandfather of Tomoro and Asuka. He previously worked with Wong on Kano Island to develop the e-Pulse for the Urban Protocol Company which led to the emergence of the Digimon, the creation of the Sapotama, and the Vanishing Kano Island Incident. Tasuku quit out of guilt and opened Sakura Orphanage to take in the children who were orphaned in the Vanishing Kano Island Incident.
Maki Kutsuwada (轡田 マキ, Kutsuwada Maki)
Voiced by: Mie Sonozaki (Japanese); Lily Emil Lammers (English)
A former Cleaner-turned-information broker who runs the coffeehouse Garando that Glowing Dawn frequents. In the past, she was friends with IceLeomon (パンジャモン, Panjamon), a lion-like Digimon who was deleted by Fumamon.
Yoshimura (吉村)
Voiced by: Yōhei Tadano (Japanese); Chris Hackney (English)
A regular customer at Garando who often helps Glowing Dawn. He also surreptitiously assists Kyo Sawashiro with sheltering the apprehended Digimon at Nirinso Shelter to prevent the Ministry from deleting them.
Hino (火野, Hino)
Voiced by: Hisayoshi Suganuma (Japanese); Alan Lee (English)
An information broker.
Hitomi Shinomiya (篠宮 ヒトミ, Shinomiya Hitomi)
Voiced by: Minami Tsuda (Japanese); Courtney Shaw (English)
A former classmate of Tomoro Tenma and a victim of Cold Heart at the hands of Hyemon Pierce. She is a hardworking student of Shin Hikarigahama High School who lives with her mother and dreams of living in a Shangri-La Egg.

=== Panda-gumi ===
Panda-gumi (熊猫組, Panda-gumi) is an organization that works to keep the Hikarigahama East Shopping Street safe. They are also allied with Glowing Dawn.

Sasataki (笹竹, Sasataki)
Voiced by: Ikuya Sawaki (Japanese); Keith Silverstein (English)
An elderly man who is the leader of Panda-gumi.
Pandamon (パンダモン, Pandamon)
Voiced by: Tomokazu Sugita (Japanese); Mick Lauer (English)
A plush giant panda-like Digimon who was rescued from e-Pulse starvation by Sasataki and has become his ally.

== Other Digimon ==
Hyemon (ハイエモン, Haiemon)
Hyemon Scar Voiced by: Takashi Matsuyama (Japanese); Mick Lauer (English)
Hyemon Pierce Voiced by: Daisuke Kishio
Two hyena-like Digimon brothers. Hyemon Scar (ハイエモンスカー, Haiemon Sukā) has a scar and Hyemon Pierce (ハイエモンピアス, Haiemon Piasu) wears an earring. After Cold Hearting Asuma Tenma, Hyemon Scar is deleted by Gokuwmon. Hyemon Pierce later digivolved to the red wolf-like Fangmon and is defeated by Gekkomon, regressing back to Punimon who was placed in the Nirinso shelter.
BlackGaogamon (ブラックガオガモン, Burakkugaogamon)
Voiced by: Satoshi Tsuruoka (Japanese); Alan Lee (English)
An akita-like Digimon who resembles Gaogamon.
MarineBullmon (マリンブルモン, Marinburumon)
Voiced by: Mie Sonozaki
A sea slug-like Digimon who was used by Genjo to attack Glowing Dawn's headquarters. It was defeated by Armalizamon and De-Digivolved to the Hyperia macrocephala-like Pichimon (ピチモン).
Burgermon (バーガモン, Bāgamon) and Burpmon (ば～ぷモン, Bāpumon)
Burgermon Voiced by: Ayaka Saitō (Japanese); Tara Sands (English)
Burpmon Voiced by: Megumi Urama
A Rookie-level hamburger-like Digimon and an unidentified-level Digimon who work as a duo. Burpmon provides Burgermon with e-Pulses in exchange for food.
Petermon (ピーターモン, Pītāmon)
Voiced by: Yumiko Kobayashi
A Peter Pan-like Digimon who was allied with a group of modern day pirates. It was then defeated at the hands of Starmon, regressing back to Datrimon.
Mummymon (マミーモン, Mamīmon)
Voiced by: Takumi Yamazaki (Mummymon), Erina Goto (Ghostmon)
A mummy-like Digimon. Originally the ghost-like Ghostmon (ゴースモン, Gōsumon), Mummymon was abandoned by his owner and was targeted by the Cleaners. He used his bandage to control a girl named Hitomi into loving Tomoro, and tried to have the Glowing Dawn cuddle their Digimon. Once the spell is broken, Mummymon is placed in the Nirinso Shelter, and regresses back to Mokumon.
Vamdemon (ヴァンデモン, Vandemon)
Voiced by: Hiroyuki Yoshino (Japanese); Joe Zieja (English)
A vampire-like Digimon. It was defeated by Wolvermon with a silver coin, regressing back to Zurumon.
Sangloupmon (サングルゥモン, Sangurumon)
A trio of eyeless wolf-like Digimon who work for Myotismon. They were deleted by Lilamon.
Fumamon (フウマモン, Fūmamon)
Voiced by: Masaya Matsukaze (Fumamon), Ami Matsushima (Curimon) (Japanese); Kellen Goff (English)
A reptilian/ninja Digimon assassin who was hired by GIFT to turn his human opponents into Cold Hearts. In a flashback, Fumamon caused the deletion of an IceLeomon, causing a distraught Maki that knew IceLeomon to develop a vendetta against him. During a showdown with Murasamemon, he defeats Fumamon, regressing back into Curimon and avenging IceLeomon’s death.
Ninjamon (イガモン, Igamon)
A group of ninja-like Digimon who work for Fumamon.
Kogamon (コウガモン, Kōgamon)
A group of ninja-like Digimon who resemble Ninjamon and work for Fumamon.
