= Majestic 12 (disambiguation) =

Majestic 12 is a purported secret committee commissioned by the U.S. government.

Majestic 12 may also refer to:

- The Majestic Twelve , 2024 album by American rock music band Heaven Below
- Majestic 12 (Deus Ex), a fictional organization from the video game Deus Ex
- The Majestic Twelve, a team of American superheroes from the Zatch Bell! anime (featured in season 1 ep. 49 & season 2 ep. 67)
- Super Space Invaders '91, an arcade video game also known as Majestic Twelve: The Space Invaders Part IV
- ""The Majestic"", A Parody of the conspiracy theory from the video game series Destroy All Humans!.
