= Komani =

Komani may refer to:

- Komani, the official name of Queenstown, South Africa, Eastern Cape
- Komani River, a river in South Africa
- Lake Komani, a reservoir in Albania
  - Komani Hydro Power Plant
- Norman Komani, Zimbabwean football player
- Komani, a stage name of American rapper Mopreme Shakur

== See also ==
- Comani (disambiguation)
- Kumani (disambiguation)
- Konami (disambiguation)
