= Umagon =

Umagon can refer to:

- a character in the Command & Conquer series of video games
- a character in the anime series Konjiki no Gash Bell! (called Ponygon in the English version)
