= Kumane =

Kumane may refer to:

- Kumane, Novi Bečej, a village in Vojvodina, Serbia
- Kumane, Veliko Gradište, a village in eastern Serbia
- Kumane, Istočni Stari Grad, a village in Bosnia and Herzegovina

== See also ==
- Kumani (disambiguation)
