= Konami (disambiguation) =

Konami is a Japanese video game developer and publisher.

Konami may also refer to:

People with the given name

- Konami (wrestler), Japanese professional wrestler
- Konami Kanata (こなみ かなた; born 1958), Japanese manga artist
- Konami Soga, Japanese speed skater
- Konami Yoshida (吉田 小南美; born 1967), Japanese voice actress
- Konami, a character in the anime Popotan

Other

- Konami Code, a video game cheat sequence often used by the developer
- Kunami, a fictional fruit in the Portuguese show Gato Fedorento that resembles rotten fruit

== See also ==
- Komani (disambiguation)
