= Kumani =

Kumani may refer to:

- Kumani (supporter group), sports ultras from North Macedonia
- Kumani, Iran, a village in Iran
- Kuman, Albania, a village in Albania

== See also ==
- Kumans, a mediaeval ethnic group
- Kummanni, a Hittite city
- Kumane (disambiguation)
- Komani (disambiguation)
- Cumani (disambiguation)
