= Comani =

Comani may refer to:

- Comani, Romania, a village in Drăgănești-Olt, Romania
- Daniela Comani, Italian artist
- Comani language, an unclassified language of South America (possibly extinct or spurious)
- Comani (tribe), a Gallic tribe

== See also ==
- Cumani (disambiguation)
- Komani (disambiguation)
- Conami
