= Cumani =

Cumani may be:

- The Latin name of the Cumans
- a surname; persons with the name include:
  - Luca Cumani, Italian horse trainer
  - Sergio Cumani, Italian horse trainer after whom the Premio Elena e Sergio Cumani race is named
  - Francesca Cumani, British horse racing presenter

== See also ==
- Comani (disambiguation)
- Kumani (disambiguation)
