= Konami Yoshida =

Japanese voice actress

Konami Yoshida (Japanese: 吉田 小南美, romanized: Yoshida Konami, formerly Japanese: 吉田 古奈美) is a Japanese voice actress from Tokyo, Japan.

== Filmography ==
=== Television animation ===
- Woman (A) in Armored Police Metal Jack (1991)
- Maria Shiratori, Hidenori Kondo in Matchless Raijin-Oh (1991)
- Taeko in Crayon Shin-chan (1992)
- Announcer in Genki Bakuhatsu Ganbaruger (1992)
- Martina Kransky, Sofia Ierines, and Mizuho Minegan in Mobile Suit Victory Gundam (1993)
- Kukuri in Magical Circle Guru Guru (1994)
- Miku in Metal Fighter Miku (1994)
- Umi Ryuuzaki in Magic Knight Rayearth (1994)
- Kanako in Saint Tail (1995)
- Hana Hatsuno and others in King of Braves GaoGaiGar (1997)
- Tatsuko in Flame of Recca (1997)
- Natsume in Generator Gawl (1998)
- Michael in Digimon Adventure 02 (2000)
- Alexandria Meat, Old Woman in Ultimate Muscle (2002)
- Seiko Taniguchi in Futari wa Pretty Cure (2004)
- Isamu Kaneda in Digimon Fusion (2012)
- Sky Land Queen in Soaring Sky! Pretty Cure (2023)

==== Unknown date ====
- Shimarisu-kun in Bonobono
- Robnos, Elly, and Gash Bell (ep142-end) in Konjiki no Gash Bell!!
- Aoi Saotome in Chō Kuse ni Narisō
- Cenicienta (101-102) in Sailor Moon S
- Ruri Himeyuri in ToHeart ~Remember My Memories~ and To Heart 2
- Lee Yeon Saeng in Jang Geum's Dream
- Reki, Elkarena in Orphen

=== OVA ===
- Azusa Kanzaki in Devil Hunter Yohko (1990)
- Princess Sheila in Bastard!! (1992)
- Hazuki Mizuhara in Tournament of the Gods (1997)

=== Theatre animation ===
- Cassie in Venus Wars (1989)
- Kukuri in Magical Circle Guru Guru (1996)

=== Video games ===
- Seena Vanpied, Rei in Flash Hiders (1993)
- Mai Amano, Arisu Shinohara in Idol Janshi Suchie-Pai II (1994)
- Narrator in Policenauts (1994)
- Mai Amano in Idol Janshi Suchie-Pai Special (1995)
- Mai Amano in Idol Janshi Suchie-Pai Limited (1995)
- Mai Amano in Idol Janshi Suchie-Pai Remix (1995)
- Umi Ryuuzaki in Magic Knight Rayearth (1995)
- Miku in Metal Fighter Miku (1995)
- Mai Amano, Arisu Shinohara in Idol Janshi Suchie-Pai II Limited (1996)
- Rick in Magic School Lunar! (1997)
- Claris in Gun Bare! Game Tengoku (1998)
- Area in Street Fighter EX (1999)
- Alexandria Meat in Kinnikuman Generations (2004)
- Alexandria Meat in Kinnikuman Muscle Grand Prix MAX (2006)
- Biyomon in Digimon World Data Squad (2006)
- Hiruko Taishoten in Oreshika: Tainted Bloodlines (2014)

==== Unknown date ====
- Kukuru in Arc the Lad series
- Seena Vanpied in Battle Tycoon: Flash Hiders SFX
- Kukuri in Mahoujin Guru Guru 1 & 2
- Milly Kiliet and Fear Mell in Star Ocean and Star Ocean First Departure R
- Alexandria Meat in Kinnikuman Muscle Generations
- Nana Izumi, Hana Hatsuno, Pagliaccio, Z-Master, and Maria Shiratori in Super Robot Wars
- Roll in the Rock Man Classic (Mega Man Classic) series (1998–2005)
- Ruri Himeyuri in To Heart 2
- MeeMee in the Super Monkey Ball Series
