= Kumane, Istočni Stari Grad =

Kumane Кумане
- Village
- Location within Bosnia and Herzegovina
- Coordinates: 43°48′N 18°28′E
- Country: Bosnia and Herzegovina
- Entity: Republika Srpska
- Municipality: Istočni Stari Grad
- Time zone: UTC+1 (CET)
  - Summer (DST): UTC+2 (CEST)

Kumane (Serbian Cyrillic: Кумане) is a village in municipality of Istočni Stari Grad, Republika Srpska, Bosnia and Herzegovina.

== Notable people ==
- Platon of Banja Luka
