= List of Zatch Bell! episodes =

Original Japanese title logo

English-release title logo

Zatch Bell!, known formally by the Japanese title Konjiki no Gash Bell!! (金色のガッシュベル!!, lit. "Golden Gash Bell!!"), is an anime based on the manga series Konjiki no Gash!! (金色のガッシュ!!, lit. "Golden Gash!!") by Makoto Raiku. The television series revolves around the eponymous character Zatch Bell, a Mamodo who, along with his human partner Kiyo Takamine, partakes in a tournament that will decide the ruler of his realm, the Mamodo world. Unlike the manga, the anime ends in a cliffhanger with only two Mamodo remaining. The series was directed by Tetsuji Nakamura and Yukio Kaizawa, and produced by Toei Animation.

The series aired in Japan on Fuji Television and its affiliates from April 6, 2003, to March 26, 2006, for 150 episodes. The English dub of the series was released in North America by Viz Media. It began airing on March 5, 2005, on Cartoon Network's Toonami in the United States, and was rerun on the network's daytime scheduling block Miguzi between May 15, 2006, and August 4, 2006. The series also aired on YTV's Bionix in Canada starting September 9, 2005. Cartoon Network dropped the series after episode 77 on January 20, 2007, while YTV continued airing it until December 6, 2008, after two seasons. Except for the first four episodes (101-104), the third season was not dubbed in English as Viz's parent company Shogakukan, the publisher of the source manga, revoked its broadcasting rights.

A total of ten theme music pieces are used for the episodes: three opening themes and seven closing themes in the original Japanese version; two opening and one ending theme in the English release. Several CDs containing the theme music and other tracks have been released by King Records. The series was released in fifty-one DVD compilations by Shogakukan between November 19, 2003, and March 7, 2007. As of July 2009, thirteen DVD compilations of the English adaption of the anime have been released by Viz Media between November 8, 2005, and December 4, 2007.

== Series overview ==
The "seasons" that compromise the episode list correspond to the Japanese video releases by Shogakukan. In Japan Zatch Bell! aired continuously year-round with regular preemptions for sporting events and television specials taking place, not split into standard seasonal cycles.

Season	Episodes	Originally released	
Season	Episodes	First released	Last released
1	50	April 6, 2003	March 28, 2004
2	50	April 4, 2004	March 27, 2005
3	50	April 3, 2005	March 26, 2006

== Episode list ==
=== Season 1 (2003–2004) ===
No. overall	No. in season	English dub title / Japanese-translated title	Original release date	English air date
1	1	"The Lightning Boy from Another World!" / "The Lightning Boy from Demon World"; Transliteration: "Makai kara kita Dengeki shōnen" (Japanese: 魔界から来た電撃少年)	April 6, 2003	March 5, 2005
2	2	"A Freezing Spell" / "The Freezing Spell Gikoru VS Zakeru"; Transliteration: "Hyōketsu jumon Gikoru tai Zakeru" (Japanese: 氷結呪文ギコルVSザケル)	April 13, 2003	March 12, 2005
3	3	"The Second Spell!" / "The Second Spell Rashirudo!"; Transliteration: "Daini no jutsu Rashirudo!" (Japanese: 第二の術ラシルド!)	April 20, 2003	March 19, 2005
4	4	"The Great Mamodo Battle" / "The Battle of 100 Demons"; Transliteration: "Hyakunin no mamono no tatakai" (Japanese: 100人の魔物の戦い)	April 27, 2003	March 26, 2005
5	5	"The Dark Mamodo" / "The Black Assassin Brago and Sherry"; Transliteration: "Kuroi shikaku Burago to Sherī" (Japanese: 黒い刺客ブラゴとシェリー)	May 4, 2003	April 2, 2005
6	6	"The Mystery of the Missing Red Book" / "The Disappearing Red Magic Book"; Transliteration: "Kieta akai mahon" (Japanese: 消えた赤い魔本)	May 11, 2003	April 9, 2005
7	7	"Botanical Madness" / "The Battle of the Botanical Gardens"; Transliteration: "Shokubutsuen no kettō" (Japanese: 植物園の決闘)	May 18, 2003	April 16, 2005
8	8	"A Kind Mamodo, Kolulu" / "The Kind Demon Koruru"; Transliteration: "Yasashii mamono Koruru" (Japanese: やさしい魔物コルル)	May 25, 2003	April 23, 2005
9	9	"The Third Spell" / "The Third Spell Jikerudo!"; Transliteration: "Daisan no jutsu Jikerudo!" (Japanese: 第三の術ジケルド!)	June 1, 2003	April 30, 2005
10	10	"The Elite Mamodo" / "The Elite Demon Eshros"; Transliteration: "Eriito mamono Eshurosu" (Japanese: エリート魔物エシュロス)	June 8, 2003	May 14, 2005
11	11	"The Invincible Folgore" / "The Invincible Folgore!"; Transliteration: "Muteki Forugore!" (Japanese: 無敵フォルゴレ!)	June 15, 2003	May 21, 2005
12	12	"Sherry's Rhapsody of Life" / "Sherry, the Rhapsody of Fate"; Transliteration: "Sherī Unmei no Rapusodī (Note: The kanji given is "狂詩曲", or "kyōkushikyoku", but is given in furigana as "ラプソデイー", or "rhapsody".)" (Japanese: シェリー運命の狂詩曲)	June 22, 2003	May 28, 2005
13	13	"The Rematch: Zatch and Hyde Meet Again" / "Showdown! Gash vs. Hyde"; Transliteration: "Taiketsu! Gasshu tai Haido" (Japanese: 対決! ガッシュ対ハイド)	July 13, 2003	June 4, 2005
14	14	"The Tomboy and the Pop Star" / "The Tomboy Tio and the Idol Megumi"; Transliteration: "Otenba Tio to Aidoru Megumi" (Japanese: おてんばティオとアイドル恵)	July 13, 2003	June 11, 2005
15	15	"A New Pledge Between Zatch and Tia" / "Gash and Tio's New Promise"; Transliteration: "Gasshu to Tio no aratanaru chikai" (Japanese: ガッシュとティオの新たなる誓い)	July 20, 2003	June 18, 2005
16	16	"The Invulnerable Robnos" / "Freezer Confrontation. The Invulnerable Robnos"; Transliteration: "Reitoko taiketsu Fujimi no Robunosu" (Japanese: 冷凍庫対決 不死身のロブノス)	July 27, 2003	June 25, 2005
17	17	"Kiyo's Curry Camping Trip" / "Kiyomaro's Curry Summer Vacation"; Transliteration: "Kiyomaro no kare na natsu yasumi" (Japanese: 清麿のカレーな夏休み)	August 3, 2003	July 2, 2005
18	18	"London Calling" / "Chase! London's Breast Groping Demon"; Transliteration: "Oe! Rondon no chichi mogema" (Japanese: 追え! ロンドンのチチもげ魔)	August 10, 2003	July 9, 2005
19	19	"The Dark Lord of the Cursed Castle" / "The Evil Flower Blooming Cursed Castle"; Transliteration: "Aku no hanasaku noroi no shiro" (Japanese: 悪の花咲く呪いの城)	August 17, 2003	July 16, 2005
20	20	"The Flowers of Evil" / "The Great Collapse! Baltro's Counterattack"; Transliteration: "Dai hōkai! Barutoro no gyakushuu" (Japanese: 大崩壊! バルトロの逆襲)	August 24, 2003	July 23, 2005
21	21	"Another Zatch" / "Another Gash"; Transliteration: "Mō hitori no Gasshu" (Japanese: もうひとりのガッシュ)	August 31, 2003	July 30, 2005
22	22	"The Dancing Mamodo" / "The Dancing Green Warrior"; Transliteration: "Odoritsuzukeru midori no senshi" (Japanese: 踊りつづける緑の戦士)	September 7, 2003	August 6, 2005
23	23	"Go for It, Ponygon!" / "Meru-Meru-Me~! Flame on, Umagon"; Transliteration: "Merumerume~! Moeyo Umagon" (Japanese: メルメルメ〜! 燃えよウマゴン)	September 14, 2003	August 13, 2005
24	24	"Apollo, the Free Traveler" / "The Free Traveler Apollo"; Transliteration: "Jiyuu no tabibito Aporo" (Japanese: 自由の旅人アポロ)	September 21, 2003	August 20, 2005
25	25	"Apollo, the Free Traveler Part 2" / "The Decisive Battle! The Will to Win"; Transliteration: "Kessen! Shōri e no shuunen" (Japanese: 決戦! 勝利への執念)	September 28, 2003	August 27, 2005
26	26	"A Day with Zatch" / "Gash's One Day"; Transliteration: "Gasshu no ichinichi" (Japanese: ガッシュの一日)	October 5, 2003	September 3, 2005
27	27	"Danny Boy" / "My Son Danny"; Transliteration: "Waga musuko Danii" (Japanese: わが息子ダニー)	October 12, 2003	September 10, 2005
28	28	"Tia and Megumi's Excellent Adventure" / "Tio and Megumi's Great Adventure"; Transliteration: "Tio to Megumi no dai bōken" (Japanese: ティオと恵の大冒険)	October 19, 2003	September 17, 2005
29	29	"The Amusement Park Battle" / "Fierce Fighting! The Amusement Park Battle"; Transliteration: "Gekitō! Yūenchi batoru" (Japanese: 激闘! 遊園地バトル)	October 26, 2003	September 24, 2005
30	30	"Zatch and Tia: A Fierce Combination" / "Gash and Tio: The Strongest Combination"; Transliteration: "Gasshu to Tio Saikyō no konbineshiyon" (Japanese: ガッシュとティオ 最強のコンビネーション)	November 2, 2003	October 1, 2005
31	31	"The Cute Transfer Student" / "The Cute Transfer Student"; Transliteration: "Makyōhen Kawaii (Note: Written in katana as "カワイイ" which indirectly translates to "cute.") tenkōsei!" (Japanese: 魔鏡編 カワイイ転校生!)	November 9, 2003	October 8, 2005
32	32	"Shion's Secret" / "Shion's Sad Secret"; Transliteration: "Makyōhen Shion no kanashiki himitsu" (Japanese: 魔鏡編 詞音の悲しき秘密)	November 16, 2003	October 15, 2005
33	33	"The Joining of the Three" / "When Three Pieces Reunite"; Transliteration: "Makyōhen Mitsu no kakera ga sorou toki" (Japanese: 魔鏡編 三つのかけらがそろう時)	November 23, 2003	October 29, 2005
34	34	"Sunset Soaked in Tears" / "Tears Bathed in the Sunset"; Transliteration: "Makyōhen Yūhi ni somatta namida" (Japanese: 魔鏡編 夕陽に染まった涙)	November 30, 2003	November 5, 2005
35	35	"The Final Mirror Battle" / "The Burning Final Battle"; Transliteration: "Makyōhen Shakunetsu no saishū kessen" (Japanese: 魔鏡編 灼熱の最終決戦)	December 7, 2003	November 12, 2005
36	36	"Collision: Zatch vs. Naomi" / "Clash! Gash VS Naomi"; Transliteration: "Gekitotsu! Gasshu tai Naomi-chan" (Japanese: 激突! ガッシュVSナオミちゃん)	December 14, 2003	November 26, 2005
37	37	"Battle in Hong Kong" / "Unstoppable Love! The Pure Love of a Hong Kong Girl"; Transliteration: "Ai wo tsuranuke! Honkon junai musume" (Japanese: 愛をつらぬけ! 香港純愛娘)	December 21, 2003	December 3, 2005
38	38	"Battle in Hong Kong Part 2" / "The Iron Fist of Love! Gou Bauren"; Transliteration: "Koi no tekken! Gou Bauren" (Japanese: 恋の鉄拳! ゴウ·バウレン)	December 28, 2003	December 10, 2005
39	39	"The Invisible Hunter" / "Desperate situation! The Hunter without Appearance"; Transliteration: "Zettai zetsumei! Sugata naki hantaa (Note: The kanji given is "狩人", or "karyūdo", but the furigana is given as "ハンター", or "hunter".)" (Japanese: 絶体絶命! 姿なき狩人)	January 11, 2004	December 17, 2005
40	40	"Big Brother Kanchome" / "Kanchomé Becomes an Elder Brother"; Transliteration: "Kyanchome, niichan ni naru" (Japanese: キャンチョメ, 兄ちゃんになる)	January 18, 2004	January 7, 2006
41	41	"Invincible Kanchome" / "Great Reversal! Invisible Kanchomé"; Transliteration: "Dai gyakuten! Muteki Kyanchome" (Japanese: 大逆転! 無敵キャンチョメ)	January 25, 2004	January 14, 2006
42	42	"Coldhearted Foes" / "The Ruthless Enemies: Zeon and Dufaux"; Transliteration: "Hijō naru teki Zeon to Dyufō" (Japanese: 非情なる敵 ゼオンとデュフォー)	February 1, 2004	January 21, 2006
43	43	"Praying Mantis Joe: The Hero of Justice" / "The Hero of Justice Kamakiri Joe"; Transliteration: "Seigi no Hiirō Kamakiri Jiō" (Japanese: 正義のヒーロー カマキリジョー)	February 8, 2004	January 28, 2006
44	44	"Invitation to a Duel" / "A Challenge from Bari"; Transliteration: "Barī kara no chōsenjō" (Japanese: バリーからの挑戦状)	February 15, 2004	February 4, 2006
45	45	"Zatch vs. Bari" / "Endless Death Battle: Gash VS Bari"; Transliteration: "Hate nakishitō Gasshu tai Barī" (Japanese: 果てなき死闘 ガッシュVSバリー)	February 22, 2004	February 11, 2006
46	46	"Ponygon's Close Call" / "Meru-Meru-Me~! Umagon Close Call!?"; Transliteration: "Merumerume~! Umagon kikīpatsu" (Japanese: メルメルメ〜! ウマゴン危機一髪!?)	February 29, 2004	February 18, 2006
47	47	"Rumble in the Snow" / "Snowfield Rumble!! The King's Style"; Transliteration: "Setsugen meidō!! Ōja no fūkaku" (Japanese: 雪原鳴動!! 王者の風格)	March 7, 2004	February 25, 2006
48	48	"The Mystery of the Stone Tablets" / "The Shinobi by Evil! The Mystery of the Lithographs"; Transliteration: "Shinobi yoru jaaku! Sekiban no nazo" (Japanese: 忍びよる邪悪! 石版の謎)	March 14, 2004	March 4, 2006
49	49	"Dr. Riddles and the Majestic Twelve" / "Dr. Nazonazo and the Majestic Twelve"; Transliteration: "Nazonazo Hakase to Majosutikku Tōeribu (Note: The kanji is given as "12人の刺客", which roughly translates to "Twelve Assassins". The furigana reads "マジョスティックトエリブ", or "Majestic Twelve".)" (Japanese: ナゾナゾ博士と12人の刺客)	March 21, 2004	March 11, 2006
50	50	"The Sixth Spell" / "Activate! The Sixth Spell Rauzaruku!!"; Transliteration: "Hatsudō! Dairoku no jutsu Rauzaruku!!" (Japanese: 発動! 第六の術ラウザルク!!)	March 28, 2004	March 11, 2006

=== Season 2 (2004–2005) ===
No. overall	No. in season	English dub title / Japanese-translated title	Original release date	English air date
51	1	"The Masked Mamodo" / "Assault!! The Masked Devil Lord"; Transliteration: "Kyōshū!! Kamen no akuma Rōdo" (Japanese: 強襲!! 仮面の悪魔ロード)	April 4, 2004	April 1, 2006
52	2	"My Beloved Zatch" / "My Beloved Gash! I am Patie!"; Transliteration: "Itoshi no Gasshu! Watashi wa Pati!" (Japanese: 愛しのガッシュ! 私はパティ!)	April 11, 2004	April 8, 2006
53	3	"So Giaku, The Water Dragon of Rage!" / "Goddaaaaamn!! Suou Giakuru of Rage"; Transliteration: "Gaddeeeeemu!! Ikari no Suou Giakuru! (Note: The kanji given is "水龍" which translates to "suiryū", or "water dragon". The furigana reads "スオウ·ギアクル", the Japanese reading of the spell.)" (Japanese: ガッデーーーーム!! 怒りの水龍)	April 18, 2004	May 27, 2006
54	4	"Battle at the Park! Zatch vs. Kiyo!?" / "Park Fight! Gash vs. Kiyomaro!?"; Transliteration: "Kōen Faito! Gasshu tai Kiyomaro!?" (Japanese: 公園ファイト! ガッシュVS清麿!?)	April 25, 2004	June 3, 2006
55	5	"Penny's Revenge! Assassins on the Loose!" / "Patie Counterattacks!! When Assassins are Released"; Transliteration: "Pati Ribenju!! (Note: The kanji given is "逆襲", which means "gyakurushū", or "counterattack". The furigana reads "リベンジ", or "revenge".) Toki hanatareta shikyakutachi" (Japanese: パティ逆襲!! とき放たれた刺客たち)	May 2, 2004	June 10, 2006
56	6	"The Light of Hope, Saifogeo!" / "The Light of Hope, Saifojio"; Transliteration: "Kibō no Hikari, Saifojio" (Japanese: 希望の光·サイフォジオ)	May 9, 2004	June 24, 2006
57	7	"Battle on the Sands: Brago vs. The Silent Rulers!" / "Battle of the Hot Sands: Brago VS The Three Silent Rulers"; Transliteration: "Netsu sa no tatakai Burago tai Sairento Rūrā (Note: The kanji given, "静寂の三闘士", translates to "Seijaku no san tōshi", or "Three Silent Fighters". The furigana reads "サイレント·ルーラー", or "Silent Ruler".)" (Japanese: 熱砂の闘い ブラゴVS静寂の三闘士)	May 16, 2004	July 1, 2006
58	8	"Defeat Milordo-Z! Each Person's Resolve!" / "Defeat Lord! Everyone's Determination"; Transliteration: "Datō Rōdo! Sorezore no ketsui" (Japanese: 打倒ロード! それぞれの決意)	May 23, 2004	July 8, 2006
59	9	"Charge into the Ruins! Kanchomé's Strategy!" / "Rush into the Deboro Ruins! Kanchomé's Great Strategy!!"; Transliteration: "Totsunyu Deboro iseki! Kyanchome dai sakusen!" (Japanese: 突入デボロ遺跡! キャンチョメ大作戦!!)	May 30, 2004	July 22, 2006
60	10	"The Labyrinth's Angry Torrent" / "Battlefield! The Labyrinth of Torrent"; Transliteration: "Kōhō! Gekiryu no rabirinsu (Note: The kanji given, "迷宮", translates to "meikyu", or "labyrinth". The furigana reads "ラビリンス", the English word "labyrinth".)" (Japanese: 攻防! 激流の迷宮)	June 6, 2004	July 29, 2006
61	11	"Spell of Sorrow" / "One Thousand-Year Sorrow Spell"; Transliteration: "Issennen no kanashiki jubaku" (Japanese: 一千年の悲しき呪縛)	June 13, 2004	August 5, 2006
62	12	"Impact of the V! Very Melon!" / "Impact of the V: Very Melon!!"; Transliteration: "Bui no Shōgeki Berīmeron!!" (Japanese: Vの衝撃 ベリーメロン!!)	June 20, 2004	August 12, 2006
63	13	"Burrah! Victoream's Anger!" / "Buraaaa! Gentleman's Angry Chāguru"; Transliteration: "Buraaaa! (Note: The first "a" is small which represents the trilling "r" sound.) Shinshi ikari no Chāguru" (Japanese: ブルァアア!! 紳士怒りのチャーグル)	June 27, 2004	August 19, 2006
64	14	"The Fierce Attack of Dalmos! The Battle on Top of the Sand!" / "Onslaught Dalmos! The Deathmatch on the Sand"; Transliteration: "Mōkō Darumosu! Sashō no Desumacchu (Note: The kanji given is "決死戦", which translates to "kesshisen", but is given in furigana as "デスマッチ", or "death match".)" (Japanese: 猛攻ダルモス! 砂上の決死戦)	July 4, 2004	August 26, 2006
65	15	"Ponygon's Lightning Speed!" / "Meru-Meru-Me~! Umagon Lightning Flash!!"; Transliteration: "Merumerume~! Umagon denkōsekka!!" (Japanese: メルメルメ〜! ウマゴン電光石火!!)	July 11, 2004	September 2, 2006
66	16	"The Red Spell Book of Promise!" / "Protect! The Red Magic Book of Promise"; Transliteration: "Mamorinuke! Yakusoku no akai mahon" (Japanese: 守り抜け! 約束の赤い魔本)	July 18, 2004	September 9, 2006
67	17	"The Wonderful Majestic Twelve Return" / "The Wonderful Majestic Twelve"; Transliteration: "Subarashikikana Majosutikku Tōeribo" (Japanese: すばらしきかなマジョスティック12)	August 1, 2004	September 16, 2006
68	18	"Tia's Plan to Confess!" / "Runaway!? Tio's Great Strategy to Confess!"; Transliteration: "Bōsō!? Tio no kokuhaku dai sakusen!" (Japanese: 暴走!? ティオの告白大作戦!)	August 8, 2004	September 23, 2006
69	19	"Zofis' Evil Desires" / "Defeat It! Evil Zofis' Ambitions"; Transliteration: "Gekihaseyo! Jaaku naru Zofisu no yabō" (Japanese: 撃破せよ! 邪悪なるゾフィスの野望)	August 15, 2004	October 7, 2006
70	20	"The Four Supreme Mamodo!" / "Desperate Situation!! Stand Up, the Four Heavenly Kings"; Transliteration: "Zettaizetsumei!! Tachifusagaru Shitennō" (Japanese: 絶体絶命!! 立ちふさがる四天王)	August 22, 2004	November 4, 2006
71	21	"The Roar of Rao Diboren!" / "If I Love You... The Sorrowful Roar of Raou Dibauren"; Transliteration: "Ai sureba koso... Unare kanashimi no Raou Dibauren (Note: The kanji given, "猛虎爆裂拳", translates to "mōko bakuretsu kobushi", or "exploding tiger fist". The furigana reads "ラオウ·ディバウレン", the Japanese reading of the spell.)" (Japanese: 愛すればこそ...うなれ哀しみの猛虎爆裂拳)	August 29, 2004	November 25, 2006
72	22	"Sing for Your Lives! The Terrible Belgim E.O." / "Sing Sing! The Fearful Belgim E.O."; Transliteration: "Utae utae! Kyōfu no Berugimu Ī Ō" (Japanese: 歌え歌え! 恐怖のベルギム·E·O)	September 5, 2004	December 9, 2006
73	23	"Dr. Riddles, You'll Always Be My King!" / "Thank You, My King. Mikoruo Ma Zegaruga"; Transliteration: "Arigatō boku no ōsama Mikoruo Ma Zegaruga" (Japanese: ありがとう僕の王様 ミコルオ·マ·ゼガルガ)	September 12, 2004	December 9, 2006
74	24	"Pamoon, the Celestial Warrior" / "The Flash Dance! The Lone Warrior Pamoon"; Transliteration: "Senkō ranbu! Kokō no senshi Pamūn" (Japanese: 閃光乱舞! 孤高の戦士パムーン)	September 19, 2004	December 16, 2006
75	25	"Free Yourself from a Thousand Years of Pain!" / "Perish! The Sealed Thousand Years. Memories of Humiliation"; Transliteration: "Uchikudake! Fūin sennen kutsujoku no kioku" (Japanese: 打ち砕け! 封印千年 屈辱の記憶)	September 26, 2004	December 16, 2006
76	26	"No Escape! The Wicked Zofis Returns!" / "No Escape! The Sneaky Zofis Returns!"; Transliteration: "Nigemichi nashi!! Hiretsu naru Zofisu sairin" (Japanese: 逃げ道なし!! 卑劣なるゾフィス再臨)	October 3, 2004	December 23, 2006
77	27	"The Return of Sherry and Brago!" / "Sherry's Noble Rondo. The Explosion Baberuga Gurabidon"; Transliteration: "Sherī kedakaki rondo (Note: The kanji given is "輪舞" ("rinbu"), which means "rondo". The furigana reads "ロンド", the English word "rondo".) sakuretsu Baberuga Gurabidon" (Japanese: シェリー気高き輪舞 炸裂バベルガ·グラビドン)	October 10, 2004	January 20, 2007
78	28	"I Won't Go Back! Laila's Dark Solitude" / "I Won't Go Back! Laila's Lonely Darkness"; Transliteration: "Mō modoranai! Reira no kodoku na yami" (Japanese: もう戻らない! レイラの孤独な闇)	October 17, 2004	July 20, 2007
79	29	"The Last of the Four Supreme Mamodo" / "The Bewildering Devil: The Last of the Four Heavenly Kings Appears"; Transliteration: "Ugomeku akuma saigo no shitennō tōjō" (Japanese: うごめく悪魔 最後の四天王登場)	October 24, 2004	September 14, 2007
80	30	"The Crazed Warrior: Berzerker!" / "The Wild Beast Demolt! A Trembling Roar"; Transliteration: "Yaju Demoruto! Senritsu no otakebi" (Japanese: 野獣デモルト! 戦慄の雄叫び)	October 31, 2004	September 21, 2007
81	31	"Victory At Any Cost!" / "Seeking the Light... Jump Forth, the Two Fighting Spirits"; Transliteration: "Hikari (Note: The kanji given, "勝機", translates to "shōki", or "way to victory"; the furigana reads "ひかり", which means "hikari", or "light".) wo motomete... wakiagare futari no tōshi" (Japanese: 勝機を求めて...湧きあがれふたりの闘志)	November 7, 2004	September 28, 2007
82	32	"Selfish Penny's Goodbye" / "Selfish Patie. Suou Giakuru's Goodbye!!"; Transliteration: "Wagamama Pati Sekibetsu no Suou Giakuru!!" (Japanese: わがままパティ 惜別のスオウ·ギアルク!!)	November 14, 2004	October 5, 2007
83	33	"Zagurzem, the 7th Spell!" / "Deliver the Heat! The 7th Spell Zaguruzemu!!"; Transliteration: "Atsuki omoi yotodoke! Dainana no jutsu Zaguruzemu!!" (Japanese: 熱き思いよとどけ! 第7の術ザグルゼム!!)	November 21, 2004	May 30, 2008
84	34	"The Final Battle with Demolt!" / "The Evil Beast Demolt's Final Battle"; Transliteration: "Kyōju Demoruto saishu kessen!!" (Japanese: 凶獣デモルト最終決戦!!)	November 28, 2004	June 6, 2008
85	35	"Sherry and Koko: The Bond that Can't Be Broken!" / "Sherry's Straying Bond that Can't Be Broken!"; Transliteration: "Mayoeru Sherī tachikirenu kizuna!" (Japanese: 迷えるシェリー断ち切れぬ絆!)	December 5, 2004	June 13, 2008
86	36	"Zofis Strikes Back: The Final Showdown of Friendship!" / "Zofis Strikes Back: The Final Battle of Friendship!!"; Transliteration: "Gyakushū no Zofisu Yūjō no saishu kessen!!" (Japanese: 逆襲のゾフィス 友情の最終決戦!!)	December 12, 2004	June 27, 2008
87	37	"Save Koko! Sherry's Dioga Gravidon!" / "Save Koko! Sherry's Whole Body of Dioga Gurabidon!!"; Transliteration: "Omoi yo Koko ni todoke! Sherī konshin no Dioga Gurabidon!!" (Japanese: 思いよココに届け! シェリー渾身のディオガグラビドン!!)	December 19, 2004	July 4, 2008
88	38	"A New Departure!" / "Sherry-Brago. A New Departure"; Transliteration: "Sherī Burago Aratanaru kadode" (Japanese: シェリー·ブラゴ 新たなる門出)	December 26, 2004	July 19, 2008
89	39	"A New Year's Special: The Magnificent Victoream Returns!" / "A New Year's Special: The Brilliant V Returns!!"; Transliteration: "Shinshun supesharu karei naru Bui yo futatabi!!" (Japanese: 新春スペシャル 華麗なるVよ再び!!)	January 9, 2005	July 26, 2008
90	40	"The Hurricane Test Battle!" / "I'm Home... as Well as a Stormy Test Battle"; Transliteration: "Tadaima... soshite arashi no tesuto batoru" (Japanese: ただいま...そして嵐のテストバトル)	January 16, 2005	August 2, 2008
91	41	"Naomi's Evil Plot" / "Naomi-chan's Pursuit"; Transliteration: "Naomi-chan wo tsuiseki seyo!!" (Japanese: ナオミちゃんを追跡せよ!!)	January 23, 2005	August 9, 2008
92	42	"Dr. Riddles' Renewed Vow" / "Kido of Our Heart. Dr. Nazonazo's Renewed Vow"; Transliteration: "Waga kokoro no Kido Nazonazo Hakase aratanaru chikai" (Japanese: 我が心のキッド ナゾナゾ博士新たなる誓い)	January 30, 2005	August 16, 2008
93	43	"A Voice From Another World!" / "A Voice from Another World! Demons with Fate!!"; Transliteration: "Yisekai kara no koe! Unmei tsukita mamonotachi!" (Japanese: 異世界からの声! 命運つきた魔物たち!!)	February 6, 2005	September 6, 2008
94	44	"The Door to a Different World! Brago vs. Zatch" / "The Door to a Different World! Gash VS Brago's Strongest Confrontation"; Transliteration: "Yisekai no tobira! Gasshu tai Burago saikyō taiketsu" (Japanese: 異世界の扉! ガッシュVSブラゴ最強対決)	February 13, 2005	September 13, 2008
95	45	"Attack of the Iron Army!" / "The Different World's Wandering! Attack of the Iron Corps!"; Transliteration: "Yisekai hōrō! Osoi kakaru tetsu no gundan" (Japanese: 異世界放浪! 襲いかかる鉄の軍団)	February 20, 2005	September 20, 2008
96	46	"The Battle With Brago – Without Sherry!" / "The Different World Duel! Brago without Sherry"; Transliteration: "Yisekai kettō! Sherī no inai Burago" (Japanese: 異世界決闘! シェリーのいないブラゴ)	February 27, 2005	September 27, 2008
97	47	"Maestro's Revenge on the Mamodo World!" / "The Champion of the Different World! Maestro's Revenge"; Transliteration: "Yisekai no hasha! Fukushuu ni kibamuku Maesutoru" (Japanese: 異世界の覇者! 復讐に牙むくマエストロ)	March 6, 2005	October 11, 2008
98	48	"The Decisive Battle in the In-Between World!" / "The Different World's Big Duel! Gash-Brago's Big Mysterious Explosion"; Transliteration: "Yisekai dai kettō! Gasshu Burago ni dai okugi sakuretsu" (Japanese: 異世界大決闘! ガッシュ·ブラゴ二大奥義炸裂)	March 13, 2005	October 18, 2008
99	49	"Miss Wriggle's Class is Now in Session" / "The Love of Youth of Monmon-sensei. Kiyomaro's Tragic Defeat"; Transliteration: "Ai to seishun no Monmon-sensei Kiyomaro higeki no zanpai" (Japanese: 愛と青春のモンモン先生 清麿悲劇の惨敗)	March 20, 2005	October 25, 2008
100	50	"The Bagpipes of Sadness!" / "The Groper Folgore! The Bagpipes of Love and Sorrow"; Transliteration: "Mogeyo Forugore! Ai to kanashimi no bagupaipu" (Japanese: もげよフォルゴレ! 愛と悲しみのバグパイプ)	March 27, 2005	November 1, 2008

=== Season 3 (2005–2006) ===
No. overall	No. in season	English dub title / Japanese-translated title (Note: Titles for episodes 105 (5th in season) onward are Japanese-translated.)	Original release date	English air date
101	1	"A New Menace: The Boy that Speaks to the Wind!" / "A New Menace. The Boy that Speaks to the Wind. Baou Obliterated!"; Transliteration: "Aratanaru kyōi Kaze wo gataru shōnen Baou massatsu!" (Japanese: 新たなる脅威 風を語る少年 バオウ抹殺!)	April 3, 2005	November 15, 2008
102	2	"The Beginning of a Friendship, and the End of a Spell?" / "Disturbance of the Moonlight. The Fist of Friendship. Arth's Finishing Strike!"; Transliteration: "Tsukiyomaro no dōran Yūjo no kobushi Āsu ichigeki hissatsu!" (Japanese: 月夜の動乱 友情の拳 アース一撃必殺!)	April 10, 2005	November 22, 2008
103	3	"Ted's Blues: The Girl in the Wind" / "Ted's Blues: Restarting the Fate of the Girl in the Wind"; Transliteration: "Tedo no Burūsu (Note: The kanji given is "哀歌", or "aika", which means "sad song". The furigana reads "ブルース", or "blues".) Kaze no naka no shōjo Unmei no saikai" (Japanese: テッドの哀歌 風の中の少女 運命の再開)	April 17, 2005	November 29, 2008
104	4	"The Idol vs. the Schoolgirl!" / "Rival Idol. The Spark of Love. Suzume's Victory??"; Transliteration: "Raibaru ha aidoru Koi no hibana Suzume no shōri??" (Japanese: ライバルはアイドル 恋の火花 鈴芽の勝利??)	April 24, 2005	December 6, 2008
105	5	"Coral-Q's Battle Transformation"; Transliteration: "Kyū shū! Kyū kyoku henkei? Waga na ha Kōraru Kyū (Note: This and other episodes involving Koral Q use the English letter "Q" as a pun with its Japanese pronunciation "kyū".)" (Japanese: Q襲! Q極変形? わが名はコーラルQ)	May 1, 2005	—
106	6	"Coral-Q's Counterattack on Every Spell!?"; Transliteration: "Pinchi tōrai Gyakushuu no Kyū Zenjubon fūsatsu" (Japanese: ピンチ到来 逆襲のQ! 全呪文封殺!?)	May 8, 2005	—
107	7	"The Evolution of Bao Zakeruga!"; Transliteration: "Dengeki rensa! Kyuukyoku shinka!? Aratanaru Baou!!" (Japanese: 電撃連鎖! 究極進化!? 新たなるバオウ!!)	May 15, 2005	—
108	8	"Homesick!? Hana and Mother. Wanderlust Gash."; Transliteration: "Hōmushiku!? Hana to haha ue Samayoeru Gasshu" (Japanese: ホームシック!? 華と母上 さまよえるガッシュ)	May 22, 2005	—
109	9	"Duel in the Northern Country. Fated Rival. Umagon Frozen!!"; Transliteration: "Kitaguni no kettou Shukumei no raibaru Umagon hyouketsu!!" (Japanese: 北国の決闘 宿命のライバル ウマゴン氷結!!)	May 29, 2005	—
110	10	"Cardio's Fierce Attack! Fighters Who Burn Up the Snow Field. Umagon's New Flame."; Transliteration: "Moushuu Karudio! Setsuken ni moyasu toushi Umagon shintana honoo" (Japanese: 猛襲カルディオ! 雪原に燃やす闘志 ウマゴン新たな炎)	June 5, 2005	—
111	11	"Dance! Burst Open! Swing! Huge Airport."; Transliteration: "Odotte! Hajikete! Yureru! Dai kūkō" (Japanese: 踊って! 弾けて! 揺れる! 大空港)	June 12, 2005	—
112	12	"Spin! Spin! Fall! Fall! Explosive Ice Skating!!"; Transliteration: "Mawaru! Mawaru! Korobu! Korobu! Bakuretsu aisusukēto!!" (Japanese: 回る! 回る! 転ぶ! 転ぶ! 爆裂アイススケート!!)	June 19, 2005	—
113	13	"A Letter From a Friend. Burn the Book!! Rein's True Identity."; Transliteration: "Tomokara no tegami Hon wo moyase!! Rein no shōtai" (Japanese: 友からの手紙 本を燃やせ!! レインの正体)	June 26, 2005	—
114	14	"Weakling Kyle. Papipurio's Mustache. Rodeux's Trap."; Transliteration: "Yowamushi Kairu hige no Papipurio Rodyū no wana" (Japanese: 弱虫カイル ヒゲのパピプリオ ロデュウの罠)	July 3, 2005	—
115	15	"Rodeux's Fierce Attack. Dying Rein. Awaken, Kyle."; Transliteration: "Mōkō Rodyū hinshi no Rein Mezame yo Kairu" (Japanese: 猛攻ロデュウ 瀕死のレイン 目覚めよカイル)	July 10, 2005	—
116	16	"Ultimate Spell Explosion! Garubadosu Aborodio. Rein's Dream."; Transliteration: "Saidai jumon sakuretsu! Garubadosu Aborodio Rein no Yume" (Japanese: 最大呪文炸裂! ガルバドス·アボロディオ レインの夢)	July 17, 2005	—
117	17	"Kung Fu of Passion. Wonrei's Tragedy. Last Chapter of a Love Song."; Transliteration: "Ren'ai kanfū Higeki Wonrei renkashuushou" (Japanese: 恋愛カンフー 悲劇ウォンレイ 恋歌終章)	July 24, 2005	—
118	18	"Kidnapped Gash! Trap Over the Sea. Sinking Dartagnan."; Transliteration: "Tsuresarareta Gasshu! Umi no ue no wana Darutanian gekichin" (Japanese: 連れ去られたガッシュ! 海の上の罠 ダルタニアン撃沈)	August 7, 2005	—
119	19	"Tio's Spirit. The One And Only Partner. When Wounds Heal."; Transliteration: "Tio no genki Tada hitori no pātonā Kizu ga ieru toki" (Japanese: ティオの元気 ただ一人のパートナー 傷が癒える時)	August 14, 2005	—
120	20	"It was Seen? Oyoyo~ Prospering Momon. Tio's Gigantic Explosion!"; Transliteration: "Mirarete Oyoyoyo~ Tokimeku Momon Tio dai bakuhatsu!" (Japanese: 見られてオヨヨヨ〜 ときめくモモン ティオ大爆発!)	August 21, 2005	—
121	21	"Awaken, Jealousy. The Angered Goddess. Chajiru Saifodon."; Transliteration: "Mezameyo Jerashī Ikareru megami Chājiru Saifodon" (Japanese: 目覚めよジェラシー 怒れる女神 チャージル·サイフォドン)	August 28, 2005	—
122	22	"Legend of Kaguya. Gash's Summer Festival. Girl Who Returned to the Moon."; Transliteration: "Kaguya densetsu Gasshu no natsumatsuri Tsuki hekaetta shoujou" (Japanese: かぐや伝説 ガッシュの夏祭り 月へ帰った少女)	September 4, 2005	—
123	23	"Roar of Pride. Bari vs. Ted. Which Will Disappear?"; Transliteration: "Unare poraido Barī tai Teddo Kieru no ha docchi?" (Japanese: 唸れプライド バリーVSテッド 消えるのはどっち?)	September 11, 2005	—
124	24	"Premonition of Separation. Suzume's Confession. Hiking of Love and Youth."; Transliteration: "Wakare no yokan Suzume no kokuhaku Ai to seishun no haikingu" (Japanese: 別れの予感 鈴芽の告白 愛と青春のハイキング)	September 18, 2005	—
125	25	"Heartless Riou. The Cursed Demons. Now, to Faudo."; Transliteration: "Hijou naru Riou Noroi wareshi mamono Iza Faūdo he" (Japanese: 非情なるリオウ 呪われし魔物 いざファウードへ)	September 25, 2005	—
126	26	"Journey From Which You Cannot Return. Wavering Determination. Faudo's True Form!"; Transliteration: "Modorenai tabi Yureru ketsui Faūdo no shoutai!" (Japanese: 戻れない旅 ゆれる決意 ファウードの正体!)	October 2, 2005	—
127	27	"Arrival at Faudo! Desperate Assault. Assassins That Awaited."; Transliteration: "Faūdo touchaku! Kesshi no totsuryu Matteita shikaku" (Japanese: ファウード到着! 決死の突入 待っていた刺客)	October 9, 2005	—
128	28	"Keith, Buzarai. Symphony of Death. Goodbye, Kanchome."; Transliteration: "Kīsu Buzarai Shi no kōkyoukyoku Saraba Kyanchome" (Japanese: キース·ブザライ 死の交響曲 さらばキャンチョメ)	October 16, 2005	—
129	29	"Miraculous New Spell. Dima Buruku. I am not a Weakling!"; Transliteration: "Kiseki no shin jumon Dima Buruku Boku ha yowamushi janai" (Japanese: 奇跡の新呪文 ディマ·ブルク ぼくは弱虫じゃない!)	October 23, 2005	—
130	30	"Buzarai's Fierce Attack. Dioga VS Baou. Reversal chain." Transliteration: "Buzarai mouko Dioga tai Baou Kyakutene no rensa" (Japanese: ブザライ猛攻 ディオガ対バオウ 逆転への連鎖)	October 30, 2005	—
131	31	"Determination of the King. Friends? The World? Gash's Decision."; Transliteration: "Ō no kakugo Tomo ka? Sekai ka? Gasshu no ketsudan" (Japanese: 王の覚悟 友か? 世界か? ガッシュの決断)	November 6, 2005	—
132	32	"Test Within the Stomach. Break Through Difficult Questions. Tintin Chance."; Transliteration: "I no naka no shiren nanmon toppa Tin Tin chansu" (Japanese: 胃の中の試練 難問突破 ティンティンチャンス)	November 13, 2005	—
133	33	"Cool-Headed Zaruchim. The Truth of the Curse. Stand Up! Aleshie."; Transliteration: "Reitetsu Zaruchimu Noroi no shinjitsu Tate! Arishie" (Japanese: 冷徹ザルチム 呪いの真実 立て! アリシエ)	November 20, 2005	—
134	34	"Fighting For Whom? Wonrei and Aleshie. Decision of Suffering."; Transliteration: "Daga tameni tatakau Wonrei to Arishie Kunou no ketsudan" (Japanese: 誰がために戦う ウォンレイとアリシエ 苦悩の決断)	November 27, 2005	—
135	35	"Faudo: Deadly Zone. The Demon That Beats the Heart. Momon's Tears."; Transliteration: "Faūdo kesshiken Shinzou utsu mamono Momon no namida" (Japanese: ファウード決死圏 心臓打つ魔物 モモンの涙)	December 4, 2005	—
136	36	"Faudo's Revival Draws Near. Return Device Activated. Rivals Stand in the Way."; Transliteration: "Semoru Faūdo fukkatsu Kikansouchi shidou Tachifusagaru Raibaru" (Japanese: 迫るファウード復活 帰還装置始動 立ちふさがるライバル)	December 11, 2005	—
137	37	"The Curse's Time Limit. Crush the Seal! Reach, Gash's Feelings."; Transliteration: "Noroi no taimurimitto fuuin wo kudake! Todoke Gasshu no omoi" (Japanese: 呪いのタイムリミット 封印を砕け! 届けガッシュの想い)	December 18, 2005	—
138	38	"Demonic soldier Faudo. Light in the middle of despair. Kiyomaro's secret plan." Transliteration: "Madou kyouhei Faūdo Ketsubou no naka no hikari Kiyomaro no hisaku" (Japanese: 魔導巨兵ファウード 絶望の中の光 清麿の秘策)	December 25, 2005	—
139	39	"Aim for the brain! Roaring Faudo. Desperate re-entry." Transliteration: "Nou wo mezase Bakusou Faūdo Hisshin no saitotsunyuu" (Japanese: 脳を目指せ! 爆走ファウード 必死の再突入)	January 8, 2006	—
140	40	"Those who won't become King. Do or die! Wonrei. Final fist." Transliteration: "Ō niwanarenumono Kesshi Wonrei Saigo no tekken" (Japanese: 王にはなれぬ者 決死! ウォンレイ 最後の鉄拳)	January 15, 2006	—
141	41	"Burning Umagon. Freezing Cardio. Run to Victory!!"; Transliteration: "Moero Umagon Kyouketsu Karudio Shouri e hashire" (Japanese: 燃えろウマゴン 氷結カルディオ 勝利へ走れ!!)	January 22, 2006	—
142	42	"Sealed room. Aleshie's fight. Destiny once more!" Transliteration: "Tozasareta heya Arishie no tatakai Innen futatabi!" (Japanese: 閉ざされた部屋 アリシエの戦 因縁再び!)	January 29, 2006	—
143	43	"Burn Up Life. Warrior Aleshie. The Conclusion!? Zaruchim"; Transliteration: "Inochi wo moyase Ikusabito Arishie Ketchaku!? Zaruchimu" (Japanese: 命を燃やせ 戦人アリシエ 決着!? ザルチム)	February 5, 2006	—
144	44	"We are Kings. Kanchomé and Momon. Defeat Keith!"; Transliteration: "Bokura ha ousama Kyanchome to Momon Taose Kīsu!" (Japanese: ぼくらは王様 キャンチョメとモモン 倒せキース!)	February 12, 2006	—
145	45	"Screams that won't reach. Ted vs. Cherish. Things more important than King."; Transliteration: "Todokanai sakebi Teddo tai Cherisshu Ou yori taisetsuna mono" (Japanese: 届かない叫び テッドvsチェリッシュ 王より大切なもの)	February 19, 2006	—
146	46	"Faudo's safeguards. From Arth to Gash. Trusted future." Transliteration: "Faūdo no shugosha Āsu kara Gasshu he Takusareru mirai" (Japanese: ファウードの守護者 アースからガッシュへ 託される未来)	February 26, 2006	—
147	47	"Reversed future. Thunder emperor Zeon. Prelude to ruin." Transliteration: "Hanten suru mirai Raitei Zeon Hametsu-he no jokyoku" (Japanese: 反転する未来 雷帝ゼオン 破滅への序曲)	March 5, 2006	—
148	48	"Raging Zeon! Two fates. Gash's secret." Transliteration: "Dotou Zeon! Futatsu no shukumei Gasshu no himitsu" (Japanese: 怒涛ゼオン 二つの宿命 ガッシュの秘密)	March 12, 2006	—
149	49	"The inheritor of Baou. Gash vs. Zeon. Jigadirasu's thunder." Transliteration: "Baou wo tsugomono Gasshu tai Zeon Jigadirasu no ikazuchi" (Japanese: バオウを継ぐもの ガッシュVSゼオン ジカティラスの雷)	March 26, 2006	—
150	50	"Decisive battle against Faudo! The golden radiance. The kind king." Transliteration: "Kessen! Faūdo Konjiki no kagayaki Yasashii ousama" (Japanese: 決戦! ファウード 金色の輝き やさしい王様)	March 26, 2006	—

=== Specials ===
OVA#	Title	English airdate
1	"Special #1: Zatch and Kiyo's Odyssey"	September 3, 2005
A one-hour English-only special reviewing the events from episodes one to twenty-six. Zatch and Kiyo reminisce about their past battles.
2	"Special #2: Friends Getting Stronger"	May 20, 2006
A one-hour English-only special reviewing the events from episodes twenty-seven to fifty-two. Zatch and Kiyo talk about how their friends have improved.

== Releases ==
=== Japan ===
DVD

Shogakukan/Pony Canyon (Region 2): Grouped by season

Season 1
Volume	Date	Discs	Episodes	Reference
Volume 1	November 19, 2003	1	1-2	
Volume 2	December 17, 2003	1	3-5	
Volume 3	January 21, 2004	1	6-8	
Volume 4	February 18, 2004	1	9-11	
Volume 5	March 17, 2004	1	12-14	
Volume 6	April 21, 2004	1	15-17	
Volume 7	May 19, 2004	1	18-20	
Volume 8	June 16, 2004	1	21-23	
Volume 9	July 14, 2004	1	24-26	
Volume 10	August 18, 2004	1	27-29	
Volume 11	September 15, 2004	1	30-32	
Volume 12	October 20, 2004	1	33-35	
Volume 13	November 17, 2004	1	36-38	
Volume 14	January 19, 2005	1	39-41	
Volume 15	February 16, 2005	1	42-44	
Volume 16	March 16, 2005	1	45-47	
Volume 17	April 20, 2005	1	48-50	

Season 2: Level 2
Volume	Date	Discs	Episodes	Reference
Volume 1	May 18, 2005	1	51-52	
Volume 2	June 15, 2005	1	53-55	
Volume 3	July 20, 2005	1	56-58	
Volume 4	August 18, 2005	1	59-61	
Volume 5	September 21, 2005	1	62-64	
Volume 6	October 19, 2005	1	65-67	
Volume 7	November 16, 2005	1	68-70	
Volume 8	December 14, 2005	1	71-73	
Volume 9	January 18, 2006	1	74-76	
Volume 10	February 15, 2006	1	77-79	
Volume 11	March 15, 2006	1	80-82	
Volume 12	April 5, 2006	1	83-85	
Volume 13	April 19, 2006	1	86-88	
Volume 14	April 26, 2006	1	89-91	
Volume 15	May 17, 2006	1	92-94	
Volume 16	June 7, 2006	1	95-97	
Volume 17	June 21, 2006	1	98-100	

Season 3: Level 3
Volume	Date	Discs	Episodes	Reference
Volume 1	July 5, 2006	1	101-103	
Volume 2	July 19, 2006	1	104-106	
Volume 3	August 2, 2006	1	107-109	
Volume 4	August 18, 2006	1	110-112	
Volume 5	September 6, 2006	1	113-115	
Volume 6	September 20, 2006	1	116-118	
Volume 7	October 4, 2006	1	119-121	
Volume 8	October 14, 2006	1	122-124	
Volume 9	November 1, 2006	1	125-127	
Volume 10	November 15, 2006	1	128-130	
Volume 11	December 6, 2006	1	131-133	
Volume 12	December 20, 2006	1	134-136	
Volume 13	January 10, 2007	1	137-139	
Volume 14	January 17, 2007	1	140-142	
Volume 15	February 7, 2007	1	143-145	
Volume 16	February 21, 2007	1	146-148	
Volume 17	March 7, 2007	1	149-150	

Blu-ray

Happinet (Japan, Region A)
Volume	Release date	Discs	Episodes	Reference
金色のガッシュベル!! Blu-ray BOX	July 4, 2017	1	1–6	
金色のガッシュベル!! Blu-ray BOX	July 4, 2017	2	7–12	
金色のガッシュベル!! Blu-ray BOX	July 4, 2017	3	13–18	
金色のガッシュベル!! Blu-ray BOX	July 4, 2017	4	19–25	
金色のガッシュベル!! Blu-ray BOX	July 4, 2017	5	26–30	
金色のガッシュベル!! Blu-ray BOX	July 4, 2017	6	31–36	
金色のガッシュベル!! Blu-ray BOX	July 4, 2017	7	37–43	
金色のガッシュベル!! Blu-ray BOX	July 4, 2017	8	44–50	

=== United States ===
DVD

Viz Media (Region 1) (Note: As of August 2009.)
Volume	Date	Discs	Episodes	Reference
Volume 1	November 8, 2005	1	1-4	
Volume 2	February 14, 2006	1	5-8	
Volume 3	April 11, 2006	1	9-12	
Volume 4	June 13, 2006	1	13-16	
Volume 5	August 1, 2006	1	17-20	
Volume 6	October 17, 2006	1	21-24	
Volume 7	December 5, 2006	1	25-28	
Volume 8	February 13, 2007	1	29-32	
Volume 9	April 10, 2007	1	33-36	
Volume 10	June 12, 2007	1	37-41	
Volume 11	August 7, 2007	1	42-44	
Volume 12	October 2, 2007	1	45-48	
Volume 13	December 4, 2007	1	49-52	
