= Norman Komani =

Zimbabwean footballer

Personal information
- Position: Forward

Youth career
- 1990-1995: David Whitehead Textiles F.C.

Senior career*
Years	Team	Apps	(Gls)
2001–2005	Amazulu		

International career
2001	Zimbabwe	4	(0)
- * Club domestic league appearances and goals

Norman Komani is a retired Zimbabwean football striker.
