= List of Zatch Bell! characters =

Series' character list

The principle characters of the series. On the right is the titular character Zatch Bell in front of Kiyo Takamine. From the upper left clockwise: Tia with Megumi Oumi, Kanchomé behind Parco Folgore, Ponygon with Kafk Sunbeam, and Brago with Sherry Belmont.

The manga and anime series Zatch Bell!, known in Japan as Konjiki no Gasshu!! (金色のガッシュ!!, lit. Golden Gash!!) for the manga and Konjiki no Gasshu Beru!! (金色のガッシュベル!!, lit. 'Golden Gash Bell!!') for the anime, features an extensive cast of characters created and illustrated by Makoto Raiku. The fictional storyline takes place largely in Japan during the early 21st century and focuses on the eponymous character Zatch Bell; a being called Mamodo with supernatural powers fighting in a millennial, royal tournament; alongside an intelligent teen boy named Kiyo Takamine. The series' plot follows Zatch and Kiyo's adventure together as they fight their way through the tournament until only Zatch emerges on top and leaves Earth for his homeworld, the Mamodo world.

During the tournament, Zatch also interacts and befriends a few other Mamodo, who are convinced that he is the best hope for becoming a "kind king", his long-held goal. Among the Mamodo he collaborates with are Kanchomé, a comical duckling-like Mamodo partnered with Italian star Parco Folgore; Tia, a hot-headed Mamodo paired with a congenial teen idol Megumi Oumi; Ponygon, a pony-like Mamodo who finds Kafk Sunbeam midway in the series; and Wonrei, with whom his partner Li En is enamored. Together, they encounter and stave off malign opponents: Zofis, who brainwashes his own partner Koko along with other humans to pair them with Mamodo from the previous tournament; Rioh, who callously risks the entire Earth for the crown; Zeno Bell, Zatch's malevolent twin brother; and Clear Note, who subsequently defeats all of Zatch's allies.

The original manga ran for 323 chapters collected into 33 tankōbon volumes from May 18, 2001, to June 18, 2008. Other editions of the series have since been published. The anime was adapted from the manga and aired for 150 episodes over three seasons from April 6, 2003, to March 26, 2006. The anime digresses slightly from the manga's storyline in several aspects, with some events and elements altered, and Clear Note's uprising never seen. The TV series also concludes with only Zatch and Brago left, both who are seen making opening rounds on one another to determine the final contender. Viz Media acquired the English-adaptation rights for both the manga and anime, although only 25 volumes were translated to English, and 104 episodes were dubbed in English.

== Background ==
=== Setting ===
In the decennial 2000s, a swathe of 100 mystical beings called Mamodo (魔物, Mamono; lit. 'Demon') arrive on Earth from the Mamodo world for a free-for-all tournament that repeats every 1,000 years, the last rite occurring sometime during the 2nd millennium. Each Mamodo has a specific set of magical powers imprinted on grimoires, or spellbooks, that must be read to use them; therefore, each individual Mamodo must rely on a human partner to cast the spells for them. The Mamodo starts with only one spell but can gain more over the course of the tournament. The Mamodo is eliminated from the competition if their book is burnt, at which point they are sent back to the Mamodo world. The object of the tournament is to be the last Mamodo to survive to be anointed their world's king.

Casting a Mamodo's spell consumes the partner's stamina referred to as Heart Power (心の力, kokoro no chikara), which emerges from professing a bond in their dyad. The intensity of the spell conjured from the spellbook is also determined by the user's Heart Energy (心のエネルギー, kokoro no enerugī) or "strength from within" in the English dub of the anime. Another key element in the manga is a spontaneous psychic ability called the Answer Talker (アンサートーカー, Ansa Tōkā), which only surfaces in human characters when they are in extreme psychiatric stress. This ability allows them to read others' minds and involuntarily answer any questions or problems raised. Kiyo procures this ability in the middle of the battle against Faudo. The anime leaves out the Answer Talker, although Dufort retains his telepathic powers.^{Ep. 148}

=== Creation and conception ===
For creating the Zatch Bell! manga, Makoto Raiku wanted a "passionate story about a heartwarming friendship" as a central theme, borrowing elements of otherworldly entities, spells and grimoires. On the influence of his characters, he gave the most credit to Mazinger Z and Reideen The Brave, even taking cues from American superhero comics such as Spider-Man, the latter of which would form a template for the primary character. He also drew inspirations from a number of video games; Dragon Quest, Final Fantasy, and Animal Crossing being his top favorites. In a 2006 interview, Raiku said that he also got new ideas for characters by talking to people and through his everyday activities.

While laying the groundwork for the series, Raiku consulted with Shogakukan's editors for finalizing the original character designs. He and his agents worked out Zatch's Japanese name Gash.^{Vol. 1} In his primitive form, Zatch was portrayed as a toy that magically changes into a noble knight to defeat malevolent forces and summoned by a middle school student. Due to pressure from editors, Zatch was redesigned into a humanoid being with childly qualities, while the middle school student would become Kiyo Takamine.^{Vol. 1} Zatch and his breed were oftentimes misperceived as live puppets or dolls because of the vertical lines beneath his eyes, an idiosyncrasy shared between Mamodo. According to Raiku, the brows serve as visual aid so that the Mamodo would stand out more from human characters. Raiku observed children at play in patterning the Mamodo's motions.

During the manga run, Raiku also created Parco Folgore based on the "Invincible Italian Man" epithet and paired him with Kanchomé for their humorous psyche. He created Ponygon both as an allegory for his affinity of horses^{Vol. 7} and to lend the series an animal mascot. Suzy Mizuno was originally cast with long hair.^{Vol. 1} Sherry was envisioned to have nunchuks in her hair in disguise as rollers.^{Vol. 23}

The red spellbook belonging to Zatch was inspired by The Red Book of Appin, a supposed medicinal treatise compiled in Northern Scotland during the Middle Ages that has since mysteriously vanished. As Raiku interpreted it, the book "allowed you to make all demons into one's subordinates." For the most part, he chose the colors of Mamodo spellbooks at random, though he picked vermillion for Tia's book to accentuate her brightly hued hair.

== Major characters ==
=== Protagonists ===
==== Zatch Bell and Kiyo Takamine ====
Zatch Bell, known in the Japanese version as Gash Bell (ガッシュ・ベル, Gasshu Beru), is the title character of the franchise. Raiku created Zatch during the series' conception on a suggestion for a cute yet humble lead character. Zatch's spells are based on lightning which he fires from his mouth, alluding to Raiku's pseudonym. Zatch's most powerful spell is Bao Zakeruga,^{Ch. 48} (Note: Baō Zakeruga (バオウ・ザケルガ); transliterated as "Bao Zakerga" in the English release.) which uses up tremendous Heart Energy and is generally a last resort. Zatch is an overly cheerful and optimistic boy, but he sours at those who try to harm him or anyone else around him. As such, he strives to be a "kind king" of the Mamodo world to make many friends and protect them, as well as abolish future tournaments. Zatch becomes enthusiastic at the sight of yellowtail, his favorite food. The anime complements him with a sharp sense of smell.^{Ep. 1} In his youth, Zatch was brought into a rural life under a pitiless caretaker by his father, King Dauwan Bell, where he was also treated as an outcast by other Mamodo. At the beginning of the tournament on Earth, Zatch lost his memories because of his brother, Zeno Bell, and nearly perished in a dense forest before being rescued.^{Ch. 48} Zatch is also revealed to be inhabited by the spirit of an electrical dragon known as Bao (バオウ, Baō), which has been given to him by Dauwan and forms the bedrock of his potency. This is fully evinced when Zatch is briefly able to use spells of every Mamodo he has encountered to defeat Clear Note.^{Ch. 319} In the end, Zatch achieves his dreams by defeating Brago and becoming the only surviving Mamodo in the tournament,^{Ch. 321} but he ascends back to his homeworld as he is no longer needed on Earth.^{Ch. 322} Zatch is voiced by Ikue Ōtani, and by Konami Yoshida for the final nine episodes in the Japanese version. He is voiced by Debi Derryberry in the English dub.

Zatch's partner is Kiyo Takamine, known as Kiyomaro Takamine (高嶺 清麿, Takamine Kiyomaro) in the original, a 14-year-old junior high school student with an IQ of over 180. Because of his intelligence, Kiyo has been shunned by students so much that he misses school on a regular basis,^{Ch. 1} thus making him introverted and socially withdrawn. After his father, Seitaro, sends Zatch over to him, Kiyo's attitude evolves over the course of the series to a more empathetic and receptive nature, helping him befriend many other characters and gaining their trust. While Kiyo has a habit of shouting at Zatch over minor mishaps, he also proudly attests Zatch's growing influence on him. In combat, Kiyo conducts strategies with Zatch and others allied with the pair. During the skirmish inside Faudo, Kiyo is gruesomely mauled by Rioh and dies only to come back alive with the Answer Talker,^{Ch. 272} which would also be decisive in the fight against Clear Note.^{Vol. 33} Kiyo never acquires the Answer Talker in the anime, nor does he go through any near-death experience. At the end of the tournament, Kiyo turns down Zatch's final offer for a wish so that he may remember him for all time.^{Ch. 322} Kiyo is voiced by Takahiro Sakurai in the Japanese version, and Jason Spisak in the English dub.

==== Kanchomé and Parco Folgore ====
Kanchomé (キャンチョメ, Kyanchome) resembles a duckling with large eyes and a short bill, and donning a blanket sleeper.^{Ch. 26} His powers involve transformations and illusions, including a spell that spawns clones with inhuman strength,^{Ch. 193} and another that traps his targets in a psychological realm and gives him control over their senses.^{Ch. 298} While Kanchomé tends to be acerbic and infantile, often crying and whining, he likewise displays a powerful resolve on parity with Zatch's. Kanchomé also loves candy, and his endeavors to get his hands on one often land him in humiliating predicaments.^{Vol. 10} Kanchomé enters the tournament with a sole objective of eliminating Zatch firsthand but instead becomes his staunch ally. He is also the first of Zatch's allies to identify Faudo and experiences a bout of anxiety as a result.^{Ch. 176} Kanchomé is ousted by Clear Note in a coordinated ambush,^{Ch. 301} an event that immediately spurs Zatch and his friends into action. Kanchomé comes in 7th place on the tournament. He is voiced by Masami Kikuchi in the Japanese version; in the English dub, he is portrayed by Richard Steven Horvitz up to episode 48, and Jeff Nimoy for the remainder of the series.

Kanchomé's partner is Parco Folgore (パルコ・フォルゴレ, Paruko Forugore), a philandering and charismatic 21-year-old Italian musician and film star whom he views as a role model. His character provides the main source of comic relief for the series. Hailing from Milan, Italy, Folgore mostly tours the world with his two popular songs: Chichi o Moge! (チチをもげ!, lit. 'Grope the Breasts!') and Muteki Folgore! (無敵フォルゴレ!, lit. ' Invincible Folgore!').^{Ch. 27} (Note: In the Viz Media translation, Chichi wo Moge! was changed to Hey Hey Let's Dance all Day and Muteki Folgore to Iron Man Folgore.) Kanchomé sings the latter song to prop up Folgore during battle. Although perverted, cowardly and unsteady, Folgore is beholden to a strong moral code and is often more insightful than he lets on. In his childhood, Folgore's irritable and violent tantrums prompted his parents to disown him.^{Ch. 300} He later developed his comedic personality after witnessing a hippopotamus and an oxpecker coexisting, a precept that he shares with Kanchomé. Raiku has stated that Folgore is his favorite character. Folgore is voiced by Hiroki Takahashi in the Japanese version, and Dave Wittenberg in the English dub.

==== Tia and Megumi Oumi ====
Tia, known as Tio (ティオ) in the Japanese release, is a temperamental, tomboyish Mamodo depicted with hot pink hair.^{Vol. 8} Her powers consist mostly of shields, as well as a healing spell for supporting others.^{Ch. 108} She has a crush on Zatch, despite her penchant of haranguing and physically abusing him.^{Ch. 70, 127} Upon arriving on Earth, Tia encountered her longtime friend, Maruss, who suddenly attacked her.^{Ch. 35} Traumatized by this, she came to believe that no one could ever be trusted. That changes after Zatch defeats Maruss,^{Ch. 38} by which Tia becomes more spirited and warms up to Zatch and others in the hopes that a "kind king" would soon emerge, even encouraging them in battle. Tia loses out to Clear Note,^{Ch. 309} landing in 5th place on the tournament. Tia is voiced by Rie Kugimiya in the Japanese version, and Melissa Fahn in the English dub.

Tia's partner is Megumi Oumi (大海 恵, Ōumi Megumi), a self-confident and courageous 16-year-old J-pop singer and idol.^{Ch. 35} She devotes most of her time on her career and is often overburdened to the point of sleeplessness.^{Ch. 110} She is also skilled at judo.^{Ch. 69} Similar to Tia, Megumi expresses a romantic interest in Kiyo, who does not acknowledge this.^{Ch. 70, 168} In the anime, Megumi helped Tia understand trust and friendship after protecting her from Maruss.^{Ep. 119} The anime also depicts Megumi as a student to a charter school, where she is often stigmatized for her fame and beauty.^{Ep. 58} Megumi is voiced by Ai Maeda in the Japanese version, and Kate Higgins in the English dub.

==== Ponygon and Kafk Sunbeam ====
Ponygon, known as Umagon (ウマゴン) in the Japanese release, resembles a pony but has the dispositions of a dog.^{Ch. 57} Ponygon's spells give him armor which increases his agility and strength with each incantation, as well as lending him the ability to manipulate fire and to fly. As a running gag, Ponygon only communicates by uttering "Meru-Meru-Me" (メルメルメ) (Note: A Japanese onomatopoeia for bleating sheep.) or a combination thereof,^{Vol. 7} which precludes him from sharing his birth name, Schneider (シュナイダー, Shunaidā). This leads to Kiyo giving Ponygon his nickname.^{Ch. 57} In the Mamodo world, Ponygon railed against other Mamodo because his father worked as a riding animal. Zatch befriended Ponygon once the two saved Ponygon's father from a poisonous snake bite. Ponygon makes his debut in the manga when he and Zatch meet again following a trip across England,^{Ch. 56} though he appears earlier than this in the anime.^{Ep. 7} Ponygon is fatally overpowered by Clear Note,^{Ch. 311} thus putting him in 4th place. Raiku first proposed Ponygon to be a cat or a dog with intricate apparel and sporting a mushroom-shaped horn on his head; he ultimately opted for a simplistic design of the character. Ponygon is voiced by Satomi Kōrogi in the Japanese version, and Dave Wittenberg in the English dub.

Ponygon's partner is Kafk Sunbeam, known as Kafka Sunbeam (カフカ・サンビーム, Kafuka Sanbīmu) in the Japanese release, a 30-year-old automobile engineer from Germany. Sunbeam unites with Ponygon at the beginning of the fight against Zofis,^{Ch. 121} and he helps Zatch and Kiyo elude Zofis' minions.^{Ch. 122–125} Later on, Sunbeam moves to Kiyo's hometown to be closer with Ponygon.^{Ch. 168} When Clear Note takes down Ponygon, Sunbeam has Megumi burn his Mamodo's spellbook to stanch his wounds.^{Ch. 311} After the tournament, he moves out to Africa to live with Elle.^{Ch. 320} Sunbeam is voiced by Hozumi Gōda in the Japanese version, and Henry Dittman in the English dub.

==== Wonrei and Li En ====
Wonrei, or Wong Lei (ウォンレイ, Won Rei) in the Japanese release, is a scrupulous Mamodo teenager aiming to be a ruler that protects all.^{Ch. 71–74} His spells are themed on martial arts and incorporates ethereal imageries of a white tiger. His outfit is largely derived from Ancient Chinese traditions. Wonrei is rescued by Zatch from a prison cell on a remote island and becomes his ally.^{Ch. 74} During the fight against Zofis, Wonrei gladly agrees to Tia's request to be his protégé.^{Vol. 14} However, Wonrei aligns himself with Rioh to assist in his ambitions but only temporarily, as he rejoins Zatch once Faudo is released.^{Vol. 22–23} Depending on the manga and anime, either Wonrei is severely injured inside Faudo, prompting Tia to eliminate him in mourning,^{Ch. 222} or he loses due to an accident in his clash with Rodeaux.^{Ep. 140} Whichever the case, Wonrei becomes the first casualty for Zatch and his allies in the tournament. Wonrei is voiced by Akira Ishida in the Japanese version, and Crispin Freeman in the English dub.

Wonrei's partner is Li En, or Li Yen (リィエン, Ryien) in the original, a tenacious 15-year-old Hong Konger girl with advanced kung-fu mastery. Li En had difficulties dating other boys because her father, Li Akron, is a notorious crime lord.^{Ch. 71} She thus became depressed and overindulged herself with food until Wonrei met her. Li En soon fell in love with Wonrei and sought him as her betrothed. However, Li Akron grew discontented at this relationship and intervened, banishing Li En to Japan. There, she enlists Zatch and Kiyo's help in a successful mission to reunite with Wonrei. Later, Li En is stricken with Rioh's curse, which forces Wonrei to turn against Zatch and his friends to protect her from dying.^{Vol. 22} When Wonrei is about to return to the Mamodo world, he leaves behind his hachimaki for Li En to memorialize him by.^{Ch. 222} Li En is voiced by Haruna Ikezawa in the Japanese version, and Gwendoline Yeo in the English dub.

==== Brago and Sherry Belmont ====
Brago (ブラゴ, Burago) is a highly taciturn and antisocial Mamodo belying a more compassionate façade.^{Ch. 7} His powers are centered on gravity, and he has the ability to fluctuate gravitational pulls within a localized area and create a gravitational well with his hands.^{Ch. 9, 77} Throughout the series, Brago becomes Zatch's self-proclaimed archrival but often assumes an antihero role. Brago first encounters Zatch at Kiyo's house and nearly crushes Kiyo to death with his spell, but Kiyo musters enough courage to avert him. Thenceforth, Brago goes on a remorseless spree against other Mamodo so that he would be Zatch's only challenger. However, Brago also assists Zatch and his allies in several ways. He scares Zofis into submission before eliminating him to save Koko,^{Vol. 17} barely stops Faudo from slamming into Japan's landmass for Zatch to nullify it,^{Ch. 275} and is nearly killed trying to fend off Clear Note.^{Vol. 30} Brago is the last Mamodo that Zatch eliminates,^{Ch. 321} placing him 2nd in the tournament. Brago is voiced by Kazunari Kojima in the Japanese version, and Wally Wingert in the English dub.

Brago's partner is Sherry Belmont, or Sherry Belmondo (シェリー・ベルモンド, Sherī Berumondo) in the Japanese release, a cold-hearted 18-year-old French noblewoman born into an abusive, affluent family. She was raised by an oppressive mother who only cared about upholding the family name. As a result, Sherry attempted to kill herself by jumping off a bridge but was dissuaded by Koko whom she immediately befriended.^{Ch. 54–55} When Zofis brainwashed Koko, Sherry made rescuing her friend top priority. She later met Brago who detested her displays of weakness and sought to make her strong and unrepentant. During the Mamodo tournament, Sherry occasionally throws herself into the fray brandishing a flail. Around the beginning of the series, Sherry and Brago make Kiyo fully aware of the tournament and try to purloin Zatch's spellbook through brute strength, until Sherry decides to let them go.^{Ch. 7–10} Once her mission to free Koko from Zofis' grasp succeeds, Sherry fully commits to making Brago king of his world; however, Brago hints with her that he never wanted to rule. She returns to her family after the tournament.^{Ch. 323} Sherry is voiced by Fumiko Orikasa in the Japanese version; in the English dub, she is voiced by Saffron Henderson up to episode 85, and Karen Strassman in subsequent episodes.

=== Antagonists ===
==== Zofis and Koko ====
Zofis (ゾフィス, Zofisu) is a domineering and sadistic Mamodo who adopts the alias Milordo Z, or simply "Lord" (ロード, Rōdo) in the Japanese release,^{Ch. 109} and is the first major antagonist that Zatch encounters in the series. His spells are based on combustion. Beyond his spellbook, he can hypnotize others into following his directions without hesitation.^{Ep. 51} Zofis schemes to win the tournament by collecting stone tablets and resurrecting the forty Mamodo within them.^{Vol. 12} He then appoints them as his army and uses his hypnosis to corrupt the hearts of humans (with some exceptions) and pair them with each Mamodo, setting up sanctum inside an ancient ruin in South America as well.^{Vol. 13} As Zatch and his allies invade Zofis' hideout to break his trance on the humans, Sherry and Brago arrive and directly confront Zofis.^{Ch. 143} Brago daunts Zofis into giving in before eliminating him.^{Ch. 162} Raiku clarifies in an interview that Zofis is indeed male. Zofis is voiced by Toshiko Fujita in the Japanese version, and Susan Silo in the English dub.

Zofis' partner is Koko (ココ), a resilient girl and Sherry's longstanding best friend who talked her out of a suicide attempt when they were both young.^{Ch. 54} Koko lived in poverty until she was accepted to a university through a full scholarship. Before her admission, however, Zofis possessed Koko into committing arson on her home to test his powers when she refused to join him for the Mamodo tournament.^{Ch. 55} This is the result of Zofis implanting darkness into Koko's heart and mixing it with her pained memories to create a more cynical personality mirroring Zofis'. Koko's morass becomes the catalyst that impels Sherry into ending the Mamodo tournament as swiftly as possible. As Sherry fights for Koko's freedom, Zofis claims that this would only worsen her guilt of the travesties committed under his dominance and make her lose the will to live,^{Ch. 160} but Brago calls his bluff and forces him to erase Koko's memories of the tournament, restoring her normal self.^{Ch. 161} While recovering at a hospital in Paris, Koko is given a cover story in which she went comatose from the shock of her home village being destroyed by vandals.^{Ch. 162} Koko is voiced by Chinami Nishimura in Japanese, and Lara Jill Miller in the English dub.

==== Rioh and Banikis Ghigau ====
Rioh (リオウ, Riōu) is the second major villain encountered by Zatch in the series. Rioh is a bellicose Mamodo resembling a centaur with a maw-like pouch on his abdomen.^{Ch. 183} His moveset manifests various forms of beasts for attacks, including a verboten spell that enlarges him into one.^{Ch. 218} Rioh is a descendant of an elite sect of Mamodo tasked with stewarding Faudo. His treacherous father considered him deficient and constantly shamed him, thus Rioh aims to become king and win back the honor and respect of his tribe. He recruits several other Mamodo into his faction by buying or coercing their fealty. In the manga, Rioh engages Zatch and Kiyo in a ferocious confrontation that almost costs Kiyo's life;^{Ch. 215} while in the anime, he persistently frustrates Zatch and his friends' progress through Faudo.^{Ep. 139–147} Either way, he is eliminated by Zeno.^{Ch. 219} ^{Ep. 147} Rioh is voiced by Keiko Yamamoto.

Rioh's partner is Banikis Ghigau (バニキス・ギーゴー, Banikisu Gīgō). Banikis rides inside Rioh's dentulous pouch to protect the spellbook, but he climbs out to improve his mobility and spellcasting accuracy, inadvertently leaving Rioh vulnerable.^{Ch. 219} He first met Rioh at a zoo, mistaking him for an actual lion. Banikis is voiced by Satoshi Taki.

===== Faudo =====
Faudo (ファウード, Faūdo) is an imposing cyber-organic mecha as tall as Mt. Fuji, created as a doomsday weapon with the purpose of giving Rioh the ultimate advantage in the Mamodo tournament. It first appears as an unassuming tower situated off the coast of New Zealand.^{Ch. 208} When deployed, Faudo takes on an armored humanoid profile equipped with an arsenal of ray beams and a sword. It can teleport over a short distance and run at supersonic speed, even being able to swim. A magical gemstone grants its holder the power to helm Faudo and to modify it at their own discretion.^{Vol. 22} A special feature of Faudo, which is omitted in the anime, is Godufa (ゴデュファ, Godyufa), a power-up that assimilates the user into Faudo's autonomy but causes a debilitating degradation of their physiology.^{Ch. 226}

Faudo came about in ancient times on the Mamodo world, but it was placed in suspended animation and locked in a vault due to its destructive capabilities. After receiving Faudo as a gift, Rioh snuck it into the tournament, jeopardizing Earth's population, to break the seal that keeps it dormant. To accomplish this, Rioh places a deadly curse on several Mamodo partners, such as Li En, that gradually saps their life force which Faudo feeds on. To save the human victims from the curse, Zatch willingly helps release Faudo with his spell. Kiyo then springs a trap he set in advance to keep Faudo at bay until it could be removed from Earth. However, he miscalculates, allowing Rioh to take full control of Faudo and send it to obliterate Japan in response to Kiyo's interference.^{Vol. 22} While Zatch and his allies race against time, Zeno commandeers Faudo after defeating Rioh but keeps it apace.^{Vol. 23} When Zeno is defeated, the gemstone is lost, setting Faudo on an apocalyptic rampage.^{Ch. 273–274} Zatch promptly defuses the threat with Bao Zakeruga, bringing Faudo back into the Mamodo world;^{Ch. 275} while in the anime, Zatch completely destroys it.^{Ep. 150}

==== Zeno Bell and Dufort ====
Zeno Bell, known as Zeon Bell (ゼオン・ベル, Zeon Beru) in the Japanese release, is Zatch's twin brother and second son of Dauwan. He serves as the central antagonist for the anime sans Clear Note. Zeno's moveset is a more powerful cognate of Zatch's, being based on lightning which he discharges from his hands. Zeno is highly resentful of Zatch for inheriting the power of Bao, which he believes himself worthier of wielding.^{Ch. 259} While Zatch lived outside the royal castle, Zeno was forced to endure torturous training regimens prescribed by Dauwan, further fueling his animosity. After learning that Zatch would be in the Mamodo tournament, Zeno vowed to afflict the same degree of suffering he endured on his brother by any means. He first erased Zatch's memories and left him to die at a forest in England.^{Ch. 48} Next, Zeno conspires with Steng and Baltro in another unsuccessful lash against Zatch.^{Ch. 45} Finally, he arranges a confrontation with Zatch inside Faudo, during which Zeno accidentally reaches into Zatch's untapped memories to discover that Zatch had led a life of misery on the Mamodo world as well. Enlightened, Zeno turns over a new leaf and allows Zatch to eliminate him.^{Ch. 273} In the anime, after his defeat to Zatch, a defiant Zeno gets even by cheating Zatch out of Faudo's controls and leaves him and his friends to die with humanity under Faudo, though this inevitably fails.^{Ep. 150} Zeno is voiced by Urara Takano in the Japanese version, and Debi Derryberry in the English dub.

Zeno's partner is Dufort, or Dufaux (デュフォー, Dyufō) in the original, a misanthropic 18-year-old man born with the Answer Talker, which lets him probe thoughts of others and anticipate their moves.^{Ch. 260} As a child, Dufort was sold by his mother to a coalition of researchers who wanted to study the Answer Talker. He was afterwards left for dead but was saved by Zeno. The anime modifies his backstory: Dufort was forcefully interned at a penal colony because his psychic powers were a perceived aberration, and he was inhumanely experimented on for scientific gains until Zeno broke him out.^{Ep. 148} Regardless of the circumstances, Dufort loses faith in humanity and plots revenge against it. In the midst of the Mamodo tournament, he becomes captivated by Faudo, seeing that it would help him make humans extinct and usher in a post-civilized world for himself.^{Ch. 260} However, Dufort has a change of heart after reading Kiyo's mind, and he later helps Zatch and his friends prepare for the battle against Clear Note.^{Ch. 293} After the tournament, Dufort goes on a nomadic exile.^{Ch. 320} His fate in the anime is less clear as he is delirious while being evacuated out of Faudo.^{Ep. 150} Dufort is voiced by Hikaru Midorikawa in the Japanese version, and Dave Wittenberg in the English dub.

==== Clear Note and Vino ====
Clear Note (クリア・ノート, Kuria Nōto) is the final antagonist of the series.^{Ch. 284} He takes on an appearance of a young, slender man whose spells revolve around disintegration and cataclysm, with his final spell morphing him into a titanic beast as his true form.^{Ch. 290} His name stems from the fact that his spellbook is transparent. Clear Note seeks to claim rulership of the Mamodo world to exterminate every Mamodo before killing himself, wiping the species out of existence. He declares himself the final product on the Mamodo evolutionary line and justifies his intentions on a divine commandment. It is through Clear Note that Zatch's main allies are dispelled from the tournament.^{Vol. 31–32} As Zatch unleashes spells of other Mamodo on him, Clear Note makes a desperate attempt to kill him by annihilating Earth, only to fail as Zatch borrows Kanchomé's spell to protect himself and the planet.^{Ch. 319} Zatch ultimately kills Clear Note,^{Ch. 319} who is then reborn and reverted into a purified Mamodo baby named White (ワイト, Waito), with only Zatch bearing witness to this transformation.^{Side} Clear Note posts 3rd on the tournament.

Clear Note's partner is Vino (ヴィノー, Vinō), an infant brainwashed by him to perform his deeds. Clear Note enshrouded Vino with a formidable shield to protect his spellbook,^{Ch. 286} and at the climax of the battle with Zatch, he merges Vino with his ultimate form to directly tap into his near-infinite supply of Heart Energy,^{Ch. 291} the result of his very early age, both requiring Zatch's exorbitant powers to break through and extract Vino.^{Ch. 319} Following Clear Note's defeat, Dr. Riddles adopts Vino and begins a quest to locate his biological parents.^{Ch. 320}

== Significant Mamodo ==
=== General ===
==== Reycom and Hosokawa ====
Reycom (レイコム, Reikomu) is an easygoing Mamodo whose spells revolve around ice.^{Ch. 4} He is the first Mamodo that Zatch encounters in the tournament as well as the first competitor he eliminates.^{Vol. 1} Reycom is voiced by Motoko Kumai in the Japanese version, and Debi Mae West in the English dub.

Reycom's partner is Hosokawa (細川), a disgruntled deliveryman. Around the time he was laid off work, Hosokawa discovered Reycom who tempted him with the promise of getting rich and was ecstatic over his powers. He learns about Zatch's upbringing and confronts him, putting Kiyo on the fore of the Mamodo tournament for the first time.^{Ch. 4} Reycom enjoys the abject treatment from Hosokawa, claiming that this arduous dynamic makes him stronger.^{Ch. 6} The anime significantly expands Hosokawa's background as an unforgiving criminal who capitalizes on Reycom's spells by robbing banks and forward his greed,^{Ep. 2–3} borrowing from a separate minor character that Zatch and Kiyo encounter early in the manga.^{Ch. 3} Hosokawa is voiced by Ken Yamaguchi in the Japanese version, and Phil Hayes in the English dub.

==== Hyde and Eido Kubozuka ====
Hyde (ハイド, Haido) is a level-headed Mamodo and the first opponent that Zatch encounters in the anime's chronology.^{Ep. 1} His spells are based on wind which also allow him to go airborne. Hyde challenges Zatch twice more but is overmatched each time and runs away.^{Ep. 13} By whom or how Hyde is eliminated is unknown. The only reference to Hyde in the manga is during the battle between Zatch and Clear Note.^{Ch. 319} Hyde is voiced by Megumi Urawa in the Japanese version, and Michelle Ruff in the English dub.

Hyde's partner is Eido Kubozuka, known as Eita Kubozuka (窪塚泳太, Kubozuka Eita) in the Japanese release, a lustful and impulsive skateboarder. Eido refuses to take the Mamodo battles seriously and instead uses Hyde's spells to steal food and merchandise, and to get the attention of attractive girls, all to Hyde's annoyance.^{Ep. 13} After Kiyo stops him from harassing Suzy,^{Ep. 1} Eido makes a plan to defeat Zatch by kidnapping Suzy and some of Kiyo's classmates, but Kiyo and Zatch also derail this attempt. Hyde defends Eido against an attack by Zatch, ameliorating an otherwise fragile relationship between them both.^{Ep. 13} Eido is voiced by Hiroshi Kamiya in the Japanese version, and Robbie Rist in the English dub.

==== Gofure and Renji ====
Gofure (ゴフレ) resembles a vicious wolf. He first appears as an innocent lost puppy; however, this is revealed to be a disguise due to one spell. Another spell makes him fire a shower of stalactites. Gofure meets Zatch who takes him in as a friend, candidly unaware that he is a hostile Mamodo.^{Ch. 7} Gofure then launches his assault on Zatch inside Kiyo's house but is ousted by Brago.^{Ch. 10} Gofure is voiced by Daisuke Ono in the Japanese version, and Steve Blum in the English dub.

Gofure's partner is Renji (連次), who sees pure entertainment in the Mamodo tournament. Renji is voiced by Yukihiro Misono in the Japanese version, and Dave Wittenberg in the English dub.

==== Kolulu and Lori ====
Kolulu, or Koruru (コルル) in the Japanese release, is a dovish Mamodo. For her spells, she temporarily grows into a pernicious and berserk monster, overriding her docile personality, and sprouts steel claws on her fingers.^{Ch. 17} Kolulu initially refused to participate in the Mamodo tournament, so her violent alter ego was ingrained to force her into the fights.^{Ch. 18} Kolulu is eliminated by Zatch on her request.^{Ch. 18} She becomes a major factor shaping Zatch's motivation to be a "kind king". Kolulu is voiced by Hōko Kuwashima in the Japanese version, and Kate Higgins in the English dub.

Kolulu's partner is Lori, known as Shiori (しおり) in the original, a smart teenage girl who is constantly home alone due to her parents being away. Lori mistakes Kolulu for an abandoned child and adopts her as a sister.^{Ch. 16} She then accidentally activates Kolulu's alternate form who nearly injures her.^{Ch. 16–17} Terrified of this, Lori tries to avoid conjuring the spell again but does so to prevent Kolulu from being run over by a vehicle. This catches Kiyo and Zatch's attention, and they engage the pair in combat unaware that Kolulu and the vicious monster are one and the same^{Ch. 17} until Lori tearfully mentions Kolulu's name.^{Ch. 18} In the anime, Lori makes a cameo on a later episode in which she gives Zatch words of advice prior to his fight with Rops.^{Ep. 24} Lori is voiced by Yuka Imai in the Japanese version, and Philece Sampler in the English dub.

==== Eshros and Shin Akiyama ====
Eshros (エシュロス, Eshuros) is a cocky Mamodo with the singular focus of earning the crown of the Mamodo world. His powers are based on earth, with one spell summoning an enormous mud serpent.^{Ch. 23–24} The marks on his face change with his emotional expressions. Zatch and Kiyo misidentify him as an ordinary boy until they overhear his plan to cause mayhem, including destroying a schoolyard.^{Ch. 22–23} Zatch prevents Eshros from executing his plan, eliminating him by technicality.^{Ch. 25} The encounter with Eshros frames Zatch's perspective of good and bad Mamodo.^{Ch. 23} Eshros is voiced by Yuki Kaida in the Japanese version, and Scott Menville in the English dub.

Eshros' partner is Shin Akiyama (秋山進一, Akiyama Shin'ichi), a burlesque middle-aged adult. In spite of his muscular build, he is gentle and compassionate, always taking Eshros for granted even as he is clandestinely manipulating him. Shin befriends Zatch when he frightens off Naomi, and Kiyo confuses him for a Mamodo.^{Ch. 22} Eshros beguiles a reluctant Shin into destroying the school where he was picked on in his youth, and Shin times it on a Saturday to avoid casualties.^{Ch. 23} During the battle against Zatch, it is revealed that Shin is fulfilling his mother's deathbed wish for him to be a stronger person by heart, which Eshros has been exploiting for his own nefarious resolve.^{Ch. 24} However, Zatch convinces Shin that he is a good person and not Eshros, pressing Shin into spurning his Mamodo.^{Ch. 25} Shin is voiced by Nobuo Tobita in the Japanese version, and Steve Blum in the English dub.

==== Maruss and Rembrant ====
Maruss (マルス, Marusu) is a prideful and lavish Mamodo, as well as Tia's old best friend.^{Ch. 35} His spells produce a multitude of chains and maces. Back in the Mamodo world, he was a dear and caring person, but he becomes cruel, bad-tempered, sadistic, and heartless in the tournament. When Tia met him on Earth, Maruss proclaimed himself an opponent and severed his friendship with her. He immediately attacked her, but she fled to safety. Since then, Maruss makes Tia his prime target and pursues her relentlessly.^{Ch. 36} During Megumi's concert, Maruss nearly defeats Tia, but Zatch intervenes and ultimately eliminates him, in part because Tia and Megumi also render assistance.^{Ch. 38} Maruss is voiced by Junko Takeuchi in the Japanese version, and Joshua Seth in the English dub.

Maruss' partner is Rembrant (レンブラント, Renburanto), who is deeply loyal to Maruss and helps him chase Tia by tracking Megumi's concert stops. After Maruss is defeated, Rembrant runs off.^{Ch. 35} Rembrant is voiced by Masayuki Nakata in the Japanese version, and Roger Rose in the English dub.

==== Robnos and Ruku ====
Robnos (ロブノス) is a condescending Mamodo resembling an android with a hemispherical helmet.^{Ch. 29} For his spells, he attacks by firing a laser beam from his hand, and he can split into two copies each with half the usual amount of power.^{Ch. 31} Robnos tricks Zatch and Kiyo into battling him by falsely claiming to have kidnapped Suzy. He picks a cold warehouse as the location to give himself an edge over Zatch, but Kiyo makes an improvisatory move that allows Zatch to eliminate him.^{Ch. 31} In the anime, Robnos (not Tia^{Ch. 39}) is the first to alert Zatch and Kiyo of Zeno.^{Ep. 16} Robnos is voiced by Konami Yoshida in the Japanese version, and Colleen O'Shaughnessey in the English dub.

Robnos' partner is Ruku (リュック, Ryukku), a browbeat man in a parka.^{Ch. 29} Ruku is voiced by Tetsuo Kanao in the Japanese version, and Wally Wingert in the English dub.

==== Baltro and Steng ====
Baltro (バルトロ, Barutoro) is a complaisant Mamodo who hides in an oversized metal armor for his own expediency. His spells revolve around the use of flowers to telekinetically move metal objects; this allows him to also control minion "ghost knights", or empty plate armors with flower implants.^{Ch. 43} He can also propel his armor suit by the same means. Under Zeno's guise, Baltro sent his ghost knights to abduct Seitaro to draw Zatch into a battle with him.^{Vol. 5} When Zatch destroys the armor, Baltro retreats but is eliminated by Zeno for his falter.^{Ch. 46} Baltro is voiced by Kiyoyuki Yanada in the Japanese version, and Phil Hayes in the English dub.

Baltro's partner is Steng (ステング, Sutengu), an English former boxer^{Vol. 5} who takes up residence inside a forlorn castle and pillages surrounding settlements of their food and money, as well as capturing and enslaving villagers who resist him. Among the people he had taken are Kory's parents.^{Ch. 43} Steng was also contracted by Zeno to kidnap Seitaro as part of his elaborate scheme to eliminate Zatch. Steng is voiced by Kazuki Yao in the Japanese version, and David Rasner in the English dub.

==== Yopopo and Djem ====
Yopopo (ヨポポ) is an energetic and free-spirited Mamodo whose spells are based on the concept of music.^{Ch. 50} Yopopo wears a tight green costume and a cap with a feather. He only talks by saying his own name, as well as sing and prance out of habit.^{Ch. 49} The melodies he makes draw the attention of Kikuropu, who subsequently tosses him out of the tournament.^{Ch. 51} Yopopo is voiced by Hiroko Emori in the Japanese release, and Dave Mallow in the English dub.

Yopopo's partner is Djem (ジェム, Jemu), a flinty tween girl who lives on the English coast. Djem is annoyed at Yopopo's prancing and often pushes him out of her leisure activities.^{Ch. 49} She met Yopopo one month prior to the story when her parents welcomed him into the family. Djem tried without success to teach Yopopo the human language. Later, Kikuropu and British Gentleman invaded Djem's home and terrorized her family before Yopopo repelled them. Djem since faults Yopopo's presence for drawing her attackers and has been gradually distancing herself from him, heedless of the fact that Yopopo is trying to attract Kikuropu with his incessant singing and avenge her. When Yopopo is ousted, he utters "Friend" to a sobbing Djem as she lovingly embraces him for his final moments on Earth.^{Ch. 51} Djem is voiced by Haruhi Terada in the Japanese release, and Dorothy Elias-Fahn in the English dub.

==== Kikuropu and British Gentleman ====
Kikuropu (キクロプ) is a large, grotesque Mamodo with a heavily crustaceous exoskeleton.^{Ch. 49} His spells include sprouting pincers and stretching his hands outward at his targets.^{Ch. 50} Kikuropu heard Yopopo's singing and attacked him and Djem's family. Yopopo attempts to counter Kikuropu on his own, but Kikuropu outmatches him until Djem, Zatch, and Kiyo arrive. Zatch uses Bao Zakeruga for the first time on Kikuropu, causing his fortified skin to molt and enabling Yopopo to eliminate him.^{Ch. 51} Kikuropu is voiced by Hitoshi Bifu in the Japanese version, and Dave Mallow in the English dub.

Kikuropu's partner is British Gentleman (イギリス紳士; lit. 'English Gentleman'), a wanton man whose real name is never divulged.^{Ch. 49} He seeks to battle others for his own gratification and had menaced Djem's family for that reason. British Gentleman is voiced by Issei Futamata in the Japanese version, and Jonathan Fahn in the English dub.

==== Rops and Apollo Genesis ====
Rops (ロップス, Roppusu) resembles a ladybug.^{Ch. 59} His spells involve ropes and chains reeling out of his body which are strong enough to lift objects bigger than himself.^{Ch. 60} Rops mostly takes a position of humility in the tournament, refusing to eliminate his foes but instead leaving them in a mortifying state of judicious defeat. Kiyo witnesses Rops preventing an oncoming car from hitting a boy;^{Ch. 60} in the anime, Rops saves Suzy from the same fate.^{Ep. 24} Rops gains a newfound valor to become king that represents liberty during a subsequent battle against Zatch that ultimately culminates in a stalemate.^{Ch. 62} Rops is eliminated by Zeno in a harrowing brawl at Holland.^{Ch. 77} Rops is voiced by Mika Kanai in the Japanese version, and Michelle Ruff in the English dub.

Rops' partner is Apollo Genesis (アポロ・ジェネシス, Aporo Jeneshisu), a mellow and patrician heir to a proliferating American corporation who travels the world to find as much joy as he can before taking the reins as CEO.^{Ch. 59} How Apollo came across Rops varies between the manga and anime: in the first, Apollo spots Rops riding a raft with meager provisions;^{Ch. 61} while in the second, Apollo meets a group of children nurturing the Mamodo, who then helps Apollo get past a border barrier to escape an isolationist country.^{Ep. 25} Regardless, both Apollo and Rops happily navigate the world with each other as deep-seated companions. Apollo is able to determine that Kiyo has a Mamodo by asking what color Zatch's book is and requests a battle with the two.^{Ch. 60} After Rops' demise, Apollo accepts his promotion,^{Ch. 77} and he uses his company's resources to assist Zatch and his friends throughout the remainder of the series, such as safely ferrying Zofis' hostages back to their homes. Apollo is voiced by Toshihiko Seki in the Japanese version, and Michael Lindsay in the English dub.

==== Danny and Mr. Goldo ====
Danny (ダニー, Danī) is a pithy pubescent Mamodo.^{Ch. 64} He has only one spell, which instantly heals his injuries, but he makes up for this by physically fighting his opponents.^{Ch. 65} Although he has a rough first encounter with Zatch, they both share a rapport. However, their friendship is cut tragically short when Zatch is forced to save a historic statuette bound for a museum, ousting Danny from the tournament in the process.^{Ch. 66} Danny is voiced by Kappei Yamaguchi in the Japanese version, and Yuri Lowenthal in the English dub.

Danny's partner is Mr. Goldo (ゴルドー, Gorudō), a grouchy elderly man. He is assigned to transport the statuette to a museum and treats Danny as a deferential bodyguard, always calling him "Danny Boy" to his exacerbation.^{Ch. 64} While delivering the artifact at the museum, Goldo sends Danny to buy food and gets robbed of the package. As Danny confronts the thieves, Goldo is threatened by their ringleader before Kiyo saves him.^{Ch. 65} As Danny returns to the Mamodo world, Goldo heals him for the final time and expresses his heartful appreciation by dropping the "boy" label.^{Ch. 66} Goldo is voiced by Iemasa Kayumi in the Japanese version, and Dave Mallow in the English dub.

==== Purio and Lupa ====
Purio, known as Pappiprio (パピプリオ, Papipurio) in the Japanese release, is a vain and boisterous Mamodo who likes using his regal front to mask his predominately weak facet.^{Ch. 67} His spells involve spewing chemical-like substances from his mouth, with one paralyzing his foes for a short time.^{Ch. 68} Purio's overall strategy is to bide his time in the tournament and wait until only one Mamodo is left to challenge. He is introduced in the series collaborating with Zoboron, and they both test their teamwork against Zatch and Kiyo, but Purio retreats when Zatch and Tia defeat Zoboron.^{Ch. 69} After that, he tries to vie for other Mamodo's allegiances, with marginal results in his favor. In the final leg of the tournament, Purio befriends Kanchomé but is eliminated along with Kanchomé by Clear Note.^{Ch. 301} He places 8th on the tournament. Purio is voiced by Michiru Yamizaki in the Japanese version, and Sam Riegel in the English dub.

Purio's partner is Lupa (ルーパー, Rūpā), a woman sporting a large afro and a shriveled face. Lupa came to meet Purio at the gravesite of her late son, who had died from a heart defect. She treats Purio as her own, doing whatever possible to protect him from their opponents and going so far as bending to his selfish requests. Lupa is voiced by Chihiro Sakurai in the Japanese version, and Dorothy Elias-Fahn in the English dub.

==== Zoboron and Hige ====
Zoboron (ゾボロン) is a mute Mamodo resembling a Komodo dragon. For her spells, she fires from her mouth energy spheres that are sluggish but destructive. Zoboron confronted Purio at a tundra and following a brief scuffle, the two Mamodo allied with one another.^{Ch. 67} Later on, Zoboron and Purio nearly defeat Zatch,^{Ch. 68} but Tia saves him and helps eliminate Zoboron.^{Ch. 69} The English adaptation of the manga and anime incorrectly casts Zoboron as male. Zoboron's groans in the anime's English dub are provided by Roger Rose.

Zoboron's partner is Hige (ヒゲ), a plump and arrogant man in an Egyptian tunic.^{Ch. 67} Both Hige and Lupa train with each other by their Mamodo's side and together go head-to-head against Zatch and Kiyo.^{Ch. 68} However, when Tia and Megumi enter the fight, Hige quarrels with Lupa, unwittingly opening a division that results in his Mamodo's demise.^{Ch. 69} Hige is voiced by Kōji Ishii in the Japanese version, and also by Roger Rose in the English dub.

==== Vincent Bari and Gustav ====
Vincent Bari (ヴィンセント・バリー, Vinsento Barī) is an embittered and fomenting Mamodo wearing a purple jester garb.^{Ch. 89} For his spells, he forms vortices on his hands and unleashing them at his opponents, and for one technique uses the vortices as drills.^{Ch. 90} Before encountering Zatch, Bari defeated every Mamodo in his way in the pursuit for the meaning of battle. The scuffle with Zatch and hearing his goal of being a kind king causes Bari to rethink his aim,^{Ch. 92} and over time he begins to comprehend what being a "strong king" entails. Later, Bari infiltrates Faudo and eliminates Keith to save Zatch and his friends, but he gets caught in a trap rigged by Keith and is mortally wounded in the process, prompting Sunbeam to eliminate him out of mercy.^{Ch. 241} In the anime, Bari and Keith are shown to be acrimonious with one another after the latter beat him in a tempura eating contest.^{Ep. 146} Bari is last seen being transported out of Faudo.^{Ep. 150} Bari is voiced by Ryotaro Okiayu in the Japanese version, and Wally Wingert in the English dub.

Bari's partner is Gustav (グスタフ, Gusutafu), a Finnish man. Gustav is constantly critical of Bari's endgame. However, when Bari is defeated, he praises his Mamodo in their final moments together.^{Ch. 241} Gustav is voiced by Unshou Ishizuka in the Japanese version, and Crispin Freeman in the English dub.

==== Kido and Dr. Riddles ====
Kido (キッド, Kiddo), romanized as Kedo in the Viz Media translation of the manga, is a dimwitted Mamodo portrayed as a marionette with a graduation cap.^{Ch. 95} For his spells, Kido changes his body into various mechanical contraptions, with one producing a swarm of miniaturized self-duplicates.^{Ch. 97} His strongest spell conjures a giant mechanized goddess,^{Ch. 135} which he uses against Belgim E.O. who also dispels him.^{Ch. 136} Kido is voiced by Akemi Okamura in the Japanese version, and Brianne Siddall in the English dub.

Kido's partner is Dr. Riddles, known as Professor Nazo Nazo (ナゾナゾ博士, Nazonazo Hakase; lit. 'Professor Enigma') in Japanese release, a wacky but golden-hearted 67-year-old American illusionist.^{Ch. 95} He lives inside a massive library that gives him limitless information on everything from the outside world.^{Vol. 17} A running gag is that Kido would believe anything stated by Riddles who then tells him that he was joking, eliciting a shocked reaction from Kido. Riddles was a surgeon who quit his career and sequestered himself in the library after failing to save his grandson during a medical operation.^{Ch. 135} As soon as Kido came into his life, Riddles emerged from seclusion and shared the secret of the Mamodo spellbooks to those he trusted, Kiyo included^{Ch. 98}—this is because Kido reminded him of his late grandson. Riddles informs Zatch, Kanchomé, Tia, Ponygon, and Wonrei about the threat from Zofis and unifies them into a strike force team to blunt him,^{Ch. 126} contemporaneously enlisting Brago and Clear Note without success. Even though Kido returns to the Mamodo world, Riddles continues to contribute to the tournament by discovering the emergence of Faudo.^{Vol. 17} Riddles is implied to possess the Answer Talker.^{Ch. 320} Dr. Riddles is voiced by Rokuro Naya in the Japanese version, and Quinton Flynn in the English dub.

==== Penny and Uri ====
Penny, known as Patty (パティ, Pati) in the Japanese release, is a ravenous Mamodo portrayed as a tween girl with two long ponytails;^{Vol. 16} the shade of her blue hair differs between the manga and anime.^{Ep. 52} She specializes in water-based spells. Penny brags about her obsessive love with Zatch, which started when she spotted him capturing a yellowtail on the Mamodo world.^{Ch. 100} Penny then made multiple efforts to seduce Zatch. On Earth, she encounters Zatch in Japan, completely unaware of his amnesia. Believing that Zatch has dumped her, Penny goes on an angry rampage against him, uncasing a split personality.^{Ch. 101} After her first attempt to eliminate Zatch fails,^{Ch. 103} Penny is summoned by Zofis to command a small detachment of resurrected Mamodo to help her exact revenge on Zatch.^{Ch. 106} However, Penny flees back to Zofis when Zatch defeats them with Tia's aid.^{Ch. 109} As Zatch and company infiltrate Zofis' hideout, Penny grows wise of Zofis' horrific methods and destroys the Stone of Moonlight before being eliminated by Demolt.^{Ch. 153} In her fading moments, Penny states her desire for Zatch to forgive her misdoings and to play with her back on the Mamodo world, and he agrees to that promise. Penny is voiced by Naoko Matsui in the Japanese version, and Stephanie Sheh in the English dub.

Penny's partner is Uri, known as Wuluru (ウルル, Ururu) in the original, a vagabond who agreed to Penny's terms to steal food for his family.^{Ch. 152} At the end of the manga series, he lands a stable job as a chef;^{Ch. 323} he secures that occupation in the wake of the battle against Zofis in the anime.^{Ep. 88} Uri is voiced by Kosuke Toriumi in the Japanese version, and Stephen Apostolina in the English dub.

==== Byonko and Alvin ====
Byonko, known as Pyonco (ピョンコ, Pyonko) in the Japanese release, is a happy-go-lucky Mamodo portrayed as a frog with a clock on his chest and a three-leaf clover on his head that had been a four-leaf.^{Vol. 16} His spell set consists of attacks and defenses with viscoelastic saliva—one spell also stretches his limbs to immense proportions.^{Ch. 152} Byonko is an agent of Zofis, helping him collect stone tablets to form his army of pastime Mamodo, as well as escorting Penny over to him, inadvertently saving Zatch from her in the process.^{Ch. 103} Although Byonko strives to impress Zofis and befriend the members of his army, he soon comes to realize Zofis' evil intentions and switches over to Zatch and company. He is ousted by Demolt at the climax of the offensive on Zofis.^{Ch. 153} Byonko is voiced by Yasuhiro Takato in the Japanese version, and Brian Beacock in the English dub.

Byonko's partner is Alvin (アルヴィン, Aruvin), a semi-reclusive 56-year-old man living in retirement in Madagascar before becoming enmeshed in the Mamodo tournament.^{Ch. 152} Alvin repeatedly brushed off Byonko's urges to pair up with him, making him cry. Byonko cried louder when Alvin plucked a leaflet from the clover on his head, so Alvin sated him with a promise of giving him a cookie and agreed to accompany him. However, Alvin became wary of Zofis' deceptions and removed his dentures to prevent himself from casting Byonko's spells, but he re-inserts his teeth to back Byonko once he mutinies against Zofis. After Zofis' defeat, Alvin returns to his provincial life with Byonko's leaflet as a keepsake. Alvin is voiced by Masaaki Tsukada in the Japanese version, and David Lodge in the English dub.

==== Ted and Jido ====
Ted (テッド, Teddo) is a brash and somewhat immature Mamodo portrayed as an elegantly-clad young boy with pompadour hair.^{Ch. 170} Ted only attacks and defends against foes in hand-to-hand combat, but his spells step up his stamina level, called Gear (ナグル, Naguru; Nagur), when invoked in a certain order; his highest upgrade is Top Gear (ターボ・ファズ・ナグル, Tābo Fazu Naguru), but it causes him pain and is used sparingly.^{Ch. 234} In the anime, one spell causes Ted to emit an explosive pulse of aura that sends him into a momentary coma.^{Ep. 145} Ted becomes Zatch's friend when he spends a night at Kiyo's house.^{Ch. 167} Ted is uninterested in being king; instead, he entered the tournament to seek closure with Cherish, with whom he has a relationship.^{Ep. 103} In the manga, he encounters Cherish inside Faudo and breaks her out of Zeno's subjugation but is eliminated by Gyaron, his body fading in Cherish's arms.^{Ch. 236} Due to differences in the anime's plot points, Ted makes it to the final episode wherein he is safely teleported off Faudo.^{Ep. 150} Ted is voiced by Junko Takeuchi in the Japanese version, and Michael P. Greco in the English dub.

Ted's partner is Jido, or Jeed (ジード, Jīdo) in the Japanese release, a middle-aged streetwise drifter who rides a motorcycle as his personal means of transportation.^{Ch. 170} He is Ted's sole company in the search across the world for Cherish. On the run-up to the infiltration of Faudo, Kiyo secretly instructs Jido and Ted to rendezvous with him and Zatch by giving them Apollo's contact information by email. Jido is voiced by Kouji Ishii in the Japanese version, and Christopher Darga in the English dub.

==== Arth and Ellie ====
Arth (アース, Āsu) is an incorruptible knight-laden Mamodo who wishes to politically reform the Mamodo world "for the greater good" as king. He relies on a sword to carry out his spells.^{Ch. 170} Arth is the first to know about Faudo materializing on Earth, and he sought to forestall its release but failed.^{Ch. 171} Rioh therefore inducts him into his ranks to help undo Faudo's seal.^{Ch. 206} Upon its release, Arth fights alongside Zatch and company. During this, Arth also teaches Kiyo to read the Mamodo language. In the final stretch of the tournament, Arth falls to Gorm, an agent of Clear Note.^{Ch. 283} In the anime, Arth sacrifices himself to Rioh to get Zatch and his allies past a blockade set up by Rioh.^{Ep. 146} Arth is voiced by Hideyuki Umezu in the Japanese version, and Randall Montgomery in the English dub.

Arth's partner is Ellie (エリー, Erī), a stoic 7-year-old girl suffering from a terminal illness (the anime makes no mention of her ailment). Ellie becomes plagued with Rioh's curse as a consequence of Arth failing to stop Faudo's release.^{Ch. 206} Her condition coupled with the aftereffects of the curse severely cripples Ellie and deprives her of necessary Heart Power. Sometime after Faudo, Ellie is cured of her disease, to Arth's jubilation.^{Vol. 29} Ellie is voiced by Konami Yoshida in the Japanese version, and Sandy Fox in the English dub.

==== Koral Q and Grubb ====
Koral Q (コーラルQ, Kōraru Q) is a robotic Mamodo whose spells cause him to transmogrify into various gadgets, including deploying a cluster of mirrors.^{Ch. 164–166} Even though he deftly outruns Zatch's spells, Koral Q ultimately falls to him.^{Ch. 167} At the last moment, Koral Q gives Kiyo a photograph of Faudo as the only clue to its existence on Earth. Koral Q is voiced by Chie Kōjiro.

Koral Q's partner is Grubb (グラブ, Gurabu), a tech-savvy junior high school delinquent who, like Kiyo at the beginning of the series, has no friends.^{Ch. 164} Grubb has been spying on other Mamodo, including Zatch and his allies, from the outset to study their partners and strategies, using Koral Q as his resource.^{Ch. 165} Grubb chastises Zatch and Kiyo for battling Zofis and his army of ancient Mamodo. He is also revealed to have taken the picture of Faudo. When Grubb loses Koral Q, Kiyo encourages him to make friends, and he does so.^{Ch. 167} Grubb is voiced by Akio Suyama.

==== Kardio and Souza ====
Kardio (カルディオ, Karudio) resembles a Mongolian horse. His spells allow him to gain armor and manipulate ice, an obverse of Ponygon's moveset.^{Ch. 174} Besides his spellbook owner, Kardio hates working with others, after having been ambushed by a gang of Mamodo during the tournament. Kardio also harbors a particular distaste toward Ponygon for his fire-based techniques, and for the fact that Ponygon has many friends. He eventually overcomes his distrust and teams up with Zatch and his allies as they make their way through Faudo. Kardio is knocked out of the tournament trying to defend Ellie from a Faudo-inhabited organic being.^{Ch. 244} This does not happen in the anime as Kardio is teleported off Faudo in the series finale.^{Ep. 150} Kardio is voiced by Yuji Ueda.

Kardio's partner is Souza (サウザー, Sauzā), a hardened, albeit diligent, little boy. He is capable of understanding Kardio who, like Ponygon, is unable to speak in words; Souza is also the only human character who can understand Ponygon as well. Souza scoffs at the idea of friendship, and he angrily derides Ponygon and Sunbeam for having friends, thus stoking a bitter adversity.^{Ch. 175} He soon warms up to Zatch and company after helping Rioh unlock Faudo. Souza came across Kardio in Mongolia and mistook him for a lost horse. Souza tried riding on his back, but Kardio resisted and nearly flung Souza off, getting some of his mane pulled off as a result. After much effort, Souza tamed Kardio and became deeply fond of him. Souza also shows an apparent affection to Ellie as he attempts to make her die from Rioh's curse to prevent Faudo's release, but Kiyo deters him from that plan.^{Ch. 207} After losing Kardio, Souza returns to the campsite where he found his Mamodo and reunites with his little sister, who starkly resembles Ellie. Souza is voiced by Kumiko Watanabe.

==== Rain and Kyle ====
Rain (レイン, Rein) is a warmhearted Mamodo in the form of a large polar bear.^{Ch. 181} He specializes in attacks with claws as his spells. Rain can also transform into a young man for the purpose of disguising himself.^{Ch. 179} Rain was highly feared on the Mamodo world for his mad rampages, except for Zatch who befriended Rain after rescuing him from a tumble off a cliff.^{Ch. 180} In the tournament, Zatch cannot remember his interactions with Rain because of his amnesia.^{Ch. 178} Rain begs Zatch to eliminate him, but Zatch is reluctant to do so. Rain sustains heavy injuries in an assault by Rodeaux, and in the aftermath, Zatch finally agrees to oust Rain from the tournament.^{Ch. 183} Rain is voiced by Kenta Miyake.

Rain's partner is Kyle (カイル, Kairu), a small, cowardly orphan living in Southeast Asia. Kyle inherited an elegant mansion from his late father, but a member of the house, Jill, appropriated the family fortune and placed Kyle in a dilapidated hut.^{Ch. 178} Rain attributes Kyle's lack of self-esteem to Jill's neglectful treatment on him, and his unwillingness to cast spells is the reason that Rain wants to return to the Mamodo world.^{Ch. 179} As Zatch and Kiyo try to help Kyle regain his confidence, Purio and Lupa kidnap Kyle and force him to join them, but Zatch rescues him.^{Ch. 180} Watching Rain battle Rodeaux gives Kyle the tenacity needed to cast spells for Rain to repel a flustered Rodeaux.^{Ch. 182} Later, with Rain gone, Kyle stands up to Jill by threatening to expose her atrocities to the world.^{Ch. 183} Kyle and is voiced by Kokoro Kikuchi.

==== Rodeaux and Chita ====
Rodeaux (ロデュウ, Rodyuu) is a short-tempered Mamodo with an appearance based on a vampire bat. For his spells, he uses his wings to carry out attacks, such as creating disruptive vortices.^{Ch. 181} Purio tricks Rodeaux into recruiting Rain and Kyle, but Rain knocks Rodeaux out cold.^{Ch. 181} After that, Rodeaux becomes an acolyte of Rioh, and he kidnaps a hexed Li En to bring Wonrei over to Rioh's forces. As soon as Faudo is released, Rodeaux tries to steal it but falls back in line with Rioh who threatens to turn Faudo on those who oppose him.^{Ch. 209} In the manga, Rodeaux is strengthened with Godufa for a grueling matchup with Zatch and his allies. However, as the adverse effects of his power-up set in, Rodeaux realizes his folly and sides with Zatch. He eventually becomes devitalized to the point that he cannot battle anymore, and Purio ousts him to end his agony.^{Ch. 246} In the anime, Rodeaux shows unwavered loyalty to Rioh. Wonrei and Li En occupy Rodeaux to help Zatch and company maintain their progress through Faudo.^{Ep. 140} Thereafter, Rodeaux teams up with Zaruchim to slow down Zatch and the others, but their ploy backfires, and Zaruchim slashes Rodeaux's spellbook in anger, dispelling him from the tournament.^{Ep. 142} Rodeaux is voiced by Susumu Chiba.

Rodeaux's partner is Chita (チータ, Chīta), a girl from Brazil. She had a domestic dispute with her former boyfriend which caused the loss of her right eye. Subsequently, Rodeaux gave her a distinct eye patch. Chita willingly joins Rioh to prove herself the strongest of all. In the anime, Rodeaux injects Faudo's hormonal serum into Chita to bolster her Heart Energy during a desperate sparring with Wonrei.^{Ep. 140} Sometime after Faudo, Chita receives an eye transplant.^{Vol. 29} Chita is voiced by Shizuka Itō.

==== Keith and Berun ====
Keith (キース, Kīsu) is a tactless and overweening Mamodo whose spells involve concentrated plasma beams.^{Ch. 191} He enjoys smoking cigars and flaunts a walking stick. He often babbles out the verses of Ode to Joy and tends to wave his stick in the manner of a conductor's rod while singing. He is also a self-professed archrival of Bari, who is passive about it in the manga. Whereas in the anime, this rivalry is more reciprocal because Keith surpassed him in a potato tempura eating contest.^{Ep. 146} Although Rioh picks him for his scheme with Faudo, in reality Keith plans to betray him and get control of Faudo for himself, but Zeno beats him to it. Keith loses out to Bari inside Faudo.^{Ch. 241} In the anime, Keith is more ideologically attuned to Rioh, and he gets into an endless battle with Bari,^{Ep. 144} until he is ushered off Faudo by Kiyo.^{Ep. 150} Keith is voiced by Kenyu Horiuchi.

Keith's partner is Berun (ベルン), a movie director who wears a red ball on his nose. Berun met Keith working at a tempura restaurant where he also heard Ode to Joy. Berun is voiced by Satoshi Taki.

==== Riya and Aleshie ====
Riya (リーヤ, Rīya) is a bullish Mamodo portrayed as a small antelope with a T-shaped antler.^{Ch. 197} His spells are predicated on heavy ammunitions, such as enormous bullets fired from a cylinder on his chest.^{Ch. 203} Riya prods others with his antler to signify that he likes them. The manga and anime diverge on Riya's demise: in the first, he is eliminated by Zaruchim;^{Ch. 230} while in the second, he falls to Zeno trying to defend Zatch from him.^{Ep. 148} Riya is voiced by Kotono Mitsuishi.

Riya's partner is Aleshie (アリシエ, Arishie), a witty indigenous African teenage boy. He and Riya meet Zatch and company outside the mouth of Faudo.^{Vol. 21} Aleshie is at first skeptical of the group's mission to stop Faudo, but he becomes content to hear Zatch's solid resolution to defend every living being and accompanies them, sharing knowledge about Faudo's inner workings. In reality, however, Aleshie intended to use Zatch as subterfuge for ridding himself of Rioh's curse, which he incurred for resisting Rioh. Only after helping Rioh open Faudo's vault to lift the curse do Aleshie and Riya betray Rioh and assist Zatch and camp. Aleshie and Zaruchim also hold a grudge against one another, because Zaruchim had threatened to kill a fellow villager to blackmail Aleshie into joining Rioh's forces.^{Vol. 24} Once Faudo is gone, Aleshie reunites with his people whom he had sworn to protect from impending danger. Aleshie is voiced by Tomokazu Seki.

==== Cherish and Nicole ====
Cherish (チェリッシュ, Cherisshu) is an audacious Mamodo whose spells revolve around crystals. She ran an orphanage with her parents on the Mamodo world. Among the orphans she cared for is Ted, who aspires to be as brave as she and develops a strong bond with her. Cherish is among a cadre of Mamodo conspiring with Rioh's plans with Faudo. In the manga, as Zeno takes command of Faudo, he tortures Cherish and infuses her with Godufa to forcibly pit her against Ted, who saves her at his own expense.^{Ch. 236} Thereafter, Cherish sides with Zatch and company to retaliate against Zeno, who then ousts her.^{Ch. 265} In the anime, Cherish is willfully loyal to Rioh and accuses Ted of setting the orphanage afire and killing her parents (when it was actually Zofis). As Ted tries to commiserate with Cherish, Rioh eliminates her by sending a protoplasmic entity to attack them both.^{Ep. 145} Cherish is voiced by Ai Nagano.

Cherish's partner is Nicole (ニコル, Nikoru), a safari ranger.^{Ch. 169} She disguises herself as a male in her travels with Cherish out of concern for her own safety. Rioh places the curse on Nicole to force Cherish into complying with his wishes. Nicole is voiced by Sayaka Aida.

==== Momon and Elle Chivas ====
Momon (モモン) is a raunchy and unforthcoming Mamodo whose appearance is a blend of a chimpanzee and a rabbit.^{Ch. 184} His spells are based on cunning and evasion, which comport with his tendencies to avoid battles at all costs. Momon's droopy ears allow him to sense a Mamodo's essence and their spells. As a recurring gag, he drops his face flat on the ground whenever he tells a lie. He also delights in snatching women's undergarments and takes such interest in Tia, inadvertently making her unlock a mighty attack spell.^{Ch. 186} Notwithstanding these, Momon proves elemental in positively locating Faudo for Zatch and his friends.^{Ch. 189} Inside Faudo, he resuscitates Kiyo in a comedial fashion following Rioh's direct hits.^{Ch. 215} Momon sacrifices himself to Zeno in a confrontation that buys Zatch more time.^{Ch. 252} In the anime, Momon survives the turmoil inside Faudo and helps Kiyo with evacuation efforts before being evacuated himself.^{Ep. 150} Momon is voiced by Naozumi Takahashi.

Momon's partner is Elle Chivas (エル・シーバス, Eru Shībasu), a milquetoast and pacifistic nun. Elle ventures with Momon to find remedies to the ravages brought about by the Mamodo tournament while struggling to control her Mamodo's debaucheries.^{Ch. 184} Elle's first direct involvement in the tournament would be against Megumi and Tia, after Momon repeatedly molests the latter.^{Ch. 185} Elle becomes increasingly proactive when she forces Momon to cooperate with Zatch and his allies on their mission to Faudo. Eventually, she loses patience with Momon and furiously scolds him for his traits.^{Ch. 204} Nevertheless, Elle is deeply proud of Momon for his nonviolent choices, made plain when he defends her from Zaruchim's attacks.^{Vol. 24} Additionally, Sunbeam becomes smitten with Elle after saving her from a chasm.^{Vol. 21} At the end of the series, she and Sunbeam start a romantic relationship.^{Ch. 320} Elle is voiced by Kotono Mitsuishi.

==== Zaruchim and Laushin Mo ====
Zaruchim (ザルチム, Zaruchimu) is a phantasmal Mamodo and an ardent ally of Rioh, serving as his right-hand man.^{Ch. 190} Zaruchim's spells are umbral-based, with one allowing him to use his opponents' shadows to constrict them.^{Ch. 202} He has extra eyes on every portion of his scalp, enabling him to see omnidirectionally. Zaruchim is also revealed in the anime to possess two techniques not confined to his spellbook: shapeshifting, with which he disguises himself as Li En,^{Ep. 142} and self-duplication.^{Ep. 143} Zaruchim enlists several Mamodo at Rioh's behest to help raise Faudo from stasis. In the manga, when Zeno usurps control of Faudo, Zaruchim questions his loyalism and refuses to embrace Faudo's powers, which leads to Ponygon eliminating him.^{Ch. 230} In the anime, Zaruchim is steadfastly subservient to Rioh's cause and nearly kills Kiyo, Megumi and Aleshie with his spells before being driven off by Ted,^{Ep. 142–143} and then ousted by Zeno.^{Ep. 147} Zaruchim is voiced by Ryō Horikawa.

Zaruchim's partner is Laushin Mo (ラウシン・モー, Raushin Mō), a thickset serial burglar who is only concerned with enriching himself and securing his own future. For those reasons, Laushin readily pledges his allegiance with Rioh in the hopes of actualizing his dreams. However, at the end of the series, he is seen in jail for his crimes.^{Ch. 323} Laushin is voiced by Masami Kikuchi.

==== Fango and Adler ====
Fango (ファンゴ) is another ally of Rioh, who has sent him to stop Zatch and his allies inside Faudo.^{Ch. 207} Fango's spells are based on fire. In the manga, Fango uses Godufa to combat Ponygon and Riya. Despite this power-up, Riya eliminates him, and Zaruchim uses Fango's fading body to shield himself from another attack—this is in response to Fango's earlier dissensions.^{Vol. 24} In the anime, Fango is joined by Jedun for a battle against Ponygon and Kardio, both who subsequently oust him.^{Ep. 141} Fango is voiced by Konami Yoshida.

Fango's partner is Adler (アドラー, Adorā), a nonchalant young adult who feels that the world has no value.^{Ep. 141} Alder is voiced by Masami Kikuchi.

==== Jedun and Excarole Rum ====
Jedun (ジェデュン, Jedyun) is a green rodan-like Mamodo also allied with Rioh.^{Ch. 207} His spells create snake-like forms, while one spell makes him attack in the manner of a flying disc.^{Ch. 245} In the manga, Jedun is initially hesitant to do any kind of battle but is persuaded when he accepts the Godufa upgrade inside Faudo and attacks Zatch and his allies, and he directly targets Elle before being eliminated by Zatch.^{Ch. 255} The anime's incarnation of Jedun is more insidious wherein he teams up with Fango against Ponygon and Kardio, who quickly oust him.^{Ep. 141} Jedun is voiced Kōji Ishii.

Jedun's partner is Excarole Rum (エスカルロ・ルン, Esukaruro Run), a girl from South Korea whom Jedun captured and trapped inside a compartment on his belly. Rum casts Jedun's spells from within the Mamodo. She is voiced by Ai Nagano.

==== Gyaron and Harry Jet ====
Gyaron (ギャロン) is a chauvinistic armored Mamodo with long steel razor blades flaring from his arms.^{Ch. 207} His armor also channels his spells; one spell increases his agility,^{Ch. 233} and another makes him physically larger and stronger.^{Ch. 234} Gyaron is among the Mamodo abetting in Rioh's plan for Faudo, and is extremely obedient to Zeno who lends him Godufa (in the manga), or to Rioh (in the anime). Gyaron is ousted by Ted in the manga,^{Ch. 236} or by Riya in the anime.^{Ep. 142} Gyaron is voiced by Susumu Chiba.

Gyaron partner is Harry Jet (ハリー・ジェット, Harī Jetto), (Note: This is the character's supposed full name, as he is referred to solely as Jet (ジェット, Jetto) in the manga and Harry (ハリー, Harī) in the anime.) an opportunist who becomes obsessed with Faudo and joins with Rioh. He is cautious of Gyaron's wellbeing over his decision to merge with Godufa.^{Ch. 226} Harry is voiced by Hiroki Takahashi.

==== Ashron and Rin Visé ====
Ashron (アシュロン, Ashuron) is portrayed as a giant winged dragon with crimson scales,^{Ch. 278} which allow him to absorb opponents' attacks and mitigate damage. Ashron's spells allow him to unleash blasts of fire and alter parts of his body to fashion attacks. He is also able to change into a human form at will. His stated objective as king is to dismantle the caste system on the Mamodo world. Ashron is the first character to warn Zatch and his allies about Clear Note, with whom he has been locked in a perpetual feud since the start of the tournament.^{Ch. 284} In his final battle, Ashron manages to put Clear Note in an 18-month cryptobiotic slumber but is knocked out of the tournament in the process.^{Ch. 292} He comes in 9th place on the tournament.

Ashron's partner is Rin Visé (リーン・ヴィズ, Rīn Vizu), a largely silent young adult with radically long spiky hair who regularly calls Ashron his "master".

==== Gorm and Mir ====
Gorm (ゴーム, Gōmu) resembles a beetle.^{Ch. 280} His spells are themed on black energy. For one of his spells, he can create two-way portals that allows him to travel from one place to another in an instant, and between the portals is an intradimensional zone called the Black Room (黒い部屋, Kuroi Heya; or ブラック・ルーム, Burakku Rūmu).^{Ch. 281} Gorm strikes a close rapport with Clear Note, positioning himself as his proxy by systematically dispelling every opponent in his path, including Arth. He also escorts Clear Note via the Black Room to clash with Brago, but Zatch and Ashron intervene amid the escalation.^{Vol. 30} Consequently, Gorm carries an incapacitated Clear Note into the Black Room where he could regenerate undisturbed. At this point, Gorm decides to desert Clear Note and redeem himself.^{Vol. 31} However, Clear Note gets wind of this and vivisects Gorm, tossing his lower torso out of the Black Room in front of a startled Zatch, who eliminates him in the hope that Gorm would heal in the Mamodo world.^{Ch. 303} Gorm comes in 6th place on the tournament.

Gorm's partner is Mir (ミール, Miru), a pretentious and irrational woman with comically puffy hair. Although in collusion with Clear Note, Mir also fears him, underscored by scars across her body.

=== 1,000-year-old Mamodo ===
The Mamodo from one thousand years ago (千年前の魔物, Sennenmae no Mamono; lit. 'Demons from Thousand Years Ago') are a garrison of forty Mamodo combatants led by Zofis to carry out his ambitions. These Mamodo were trapped in lithographs by Goren of the Stone during the tournament 1,000 years prior to the main story. Zofis collects the stone tablets and resurrects the Mamodo from suspended animation. He then aggressively seeks out humans based on their ancestry and employs a mind control to uproot their free will and partner them with the ancient Mamodo. Zofis christens four of these Mamodo; Pamoon, Belgim E.O., Tsaolon, and Demolt; as the Four Supreme Mamodo (四天王, Shitennō; lit. 'Four Heavenly Kings'). Zofis also regulates the ancient Mamodo such that they cannot eliminate one another.

The Mamodo's resurrection is made possible with a powerful magical object called the Stone of Moonlight (月の石, Tsuki no Ishi; lit. 'Moon Stone'). The stone emits a radiation analogous to the Moon that grants healing properties and enhanced strength to anyone exposed to the glow. Zofis also wears a shard taken from the stone on a pendant to provide himself with an impregnable force field. When the Stone of Moonlight is destroyed, the shard disappears with it, undermining Zofis.

==== Laila and Albert ====
Laila, or Reila (レイラ, Reira) in the Japanese release, is a renegade Mamodo portrayed as a precocious little girl.^{Vol. 16} Her powers are themed on the crescent moon, and she holds a wand topped with a crescentic ornament to execute her spells.^{Ch. 120} Laila denounces Zofis' actions and plots a rebellion.^{Vol. 13} She helps Zatch and his friends evade Zofis' vanguards and retreat to safety during the first infiltration of the hideout. Soon, however, Zofis discovers her treachery and warns that she would turn back to stone if she double-crosses him again. In a state of fright, Laila tries to impede Zatch and company from reaching the Stone of Moonlight on the second incursion, but Kiyo manages to convince her that Zofis' admonition is a mind trick.^{Vol. 16} From that point on, Laila fervently assists Zatch in their fight against Demolt, and finally against Zofis himself.^{Vol. 17} In the aftermath, Zatch eliminates Laila on her request,^{Ch. 162} fulfilling her desire to return to her homeworld peacefully after being stranded on Earth for 1,000 years. Laila makes a cameo for an episode special in the anime series.^{Ep. 89} Laila is voiced by Rumi Shishido in the Japanese version, and Kate Higgins in the English dub.

Laila's partner is Albert (アルベール, Arubēru) (pronounced as "al-BAIR"), a spiritless 14-year-old high school student. Although Zofis had hypnotized him, Albert is implied to have a degree of awareness on the scenario. He and Laila work in close tandem, demonstrated as they distract Demolt from Zatch.^{Ch. 150} Laila came to know Albert from looking over his passport. Albert is voiced by Kishō Taniyama in the Japanese version, and Crispin Freeman in the English dub.

==== Alm and Mamiko ====
Alm (アルム, Alumu) is a vitriolic Mamodo with ostensibly pointy hair.^{Ch. 111} His powers are predicated on energy beams, with one spell conjuring a pyramid-shaped bomb.^{Ch. 115} He is the first ancient Mamodo that Zatch and company encounter upon entering Zofis' hideout. In the anime, Alm is also first seen with other ancient Mamodo attacking Brago and Sherry.^{Ep. 57} He relishes the power and freedom that Zofis gave him after awakening from the stone tablet, and enjoys venting all the fury that he had built up over the millennium. Zatch also senses Alm's sadness from being imprisoned for this long and sympathizes with him.^{Ch. 115} Alm is eliminated by Tia after Megumi seizes his spellbook.^{Ch. 116} In his final moments, Alm informs Zatch and allies of the Stone of Moonlight and Zofis' exact location within the ruins. Alm is voiced by Kumiko Watanabe in the Japanese version, and Julianne Buescher in the English dub.

Alm's partner is Mamiko Takahashi (高橋 真美子, Takahashi Mamiko). Mamiko is voiced by Akemi Okamura in the Japanese version, while Kari Wahlgren provided her voice in the English dub.

==== Gelios and John Owen ====
Gelios (ゲリュオス, Geryuosu) resembles a massive water dragon.^{Ch. 111} His spells lend him superskin qualities and enable him to attack with his horns or by rapidly gyrating his body. An extra spell in the anime makes him spray a torrential stream of water from his mouth.^{Ep. 60} Gelios provides backup for Alm in the clash with Zatch and company. Megumi snatches Gelios' spellbook, bringing about his elimination.^{Ch. 116} Yutaka Shibayama provides Gelios' roars in the Japanese version and in the English dub by Fred Tatasciore.

Gelios' partner is John Owen (ジョン・オーエン, Jon Ōen), a baseball coach. John is voiced by Yutaka Shibayama in the Japanese version, and Kyle Hebert in the English dub.

==== Victoream and Mohawk Ace ====
Victoream (ビクトリーム, Bikutorīmu) is a frivolous Mamodo whose body is shaped like a "V". Among his set of powers, he emanates beams of energy powerful enough to carve through stone.^{Ch. 117–118} As comical gags, he tends to narrate his current situations and exhibits dramatic mood swings; additionally in the anime, he exemplifies an enthusiasm over melons by habitually singing Very Melon (ベリーメロン, Berīmeron).^{Ep. 62–63} Victoream confronts Zatch and his friends while they are resting, catching them off guard.^{Ch. 116} At one point during the resulting battle, Victoream accidentally hits himself with a spell, to the others' bemusement. Kanchomé ousts Victoream as part of an elaborate strategy by Kiyo.^{Ch. 119} Victoream returns as a guest character for a special episode in the anime.^{Ep. 89} Victoream is voiced by Norio Wakamoto in the Japanese version, and Quinton Flynn in the English dub.

Victoream's partner is Mohawk Ace (モヒカン・エース, Mohikan Ēsu), who bears an eponymous mohawk.^{Ch. 116} Kanchomé manages to fool Victoream into attacking Ace by scribbling his face on Ace's stomach and transforming into Victoream's spellbook. Yoshikazu Nagano voiced Ace in the Japanese version, while Jason Spisak provided his voice in the English dub.

==== Dalmos and Elizabeth ====
Dalmos (ダルモス, Darumosu) is a brutish Mamodo who specializes in bomb spells.^{Ch. 120} He and Laila chase Zatch and others through areas inside Zofis' hideout, until Laila leaves a way out for Kanchomé, Tia and their partners, from which Dalmos reprimands her for betraying Zofis. He is eliminated by Ponygon after Sunbeam's arrival.^{Ch. 123} Dalmos is voiced by Hisao Egawa in the Japanese version, and Fred Tatasciore in the English dub.

Dalmos' partner is Elizabeth (エリザベス, Erizabesu). Elizabeth is voiced by Shizuka Itō in the Japanese version, and Melissa Fahn in the English dub.

==== Pamoon and Lance ====
Pamoon (パムーン, Pamūn) is the first of the Four Supreme Mamodo that Zatch and Ponygon encounter.^{Ch. 130} He uses levitating star-shaped saucers to send out his attacks and generate shields. Pamoon is the Mamodo depicted in the stone tablet that Seitaro gives Kiyo before Zofis takes it.^{Ch. 83} Pamoon is highly livid about being suspended in time and believes Zofis' false narrative that he would turn back to stone if he failed. However, when Zatch manages to hold back a strong attack with his bare hands, Pamoon relents and elects to fight beside Zatch and his friends. Zofis quickly confronts Pamoon over this and eliminates him as punishment, disproving his own earlier warnings.^{Ch. 142} Pamoon is voiced by Yōko Matsuoka in the Japanese version, and Katie Leigh in the English dub.

Pamoon's partner is Lance (ランス, Ransu).^{Ch. 137} His historic partner is revealed to be Shelby (シェルビー, Sherubī), Lance's forebear.^{Ch. 139} Lance is voiced by Jun Azumi in the Japanese version, and Richard Cansino in the English dub.

==== Belgim E.O. and Dalia Anjé ====
Belgim E.O. (ベルギム・E・O, Berugimu Ī Ō) is another of the Four Supreme Mamodo portrayed a mummy wearing a nemes. He has a wide variety of spells, some of which involve ghostly projectiles.^{Ch. 134–135} His name is a rough initialism for Isu (椅子; lit. 'chair') and Oshioki (お仕置き; lit. 'punishment'). Kanchomé and Kido encounter Belgim as he spins on his throne chair.^{Ch. 129} During the clash, Folgore performs his signature songs to entertain Belgim and to keep him from being agitated and attacking in a blind rage. Belgim ultimately falls to Kido who unleashes his most powerful spell as his last stand.^{Ch. 136} Belgim is voiced by Shigeru Chiba in the Japanese version, and Neil Kaplan in the English dub.

Belgim's partner is Dalia Anjé (ダリア・アンジェ, Daria Anje), whose trance by Zofis has reduced her to a catatonic, wicked stupor.^{Ch. 129} Dalia is voiced by Ai Nagano in the Japanese version, and Michelle Ruff in the English dub.

==== Tsaolon and Gensou ====
Tsaolon (ツァオロン, Tsaoron) is a pragmatic member of the Four Supreme Mamodo that Tia and Wonrei come across.^{Ch. 129} His spells encapsulate martial arts techniques in competition to Wonrei. Tsaolon immediately gains a tactical advantage over both Tia and Wonrei, until Tia uses her healing spell to deliver enough Heart Energy for Wonrei to dispel Tsaolon.^{Ch. 133} Tsaolon is voiced by Yuichi Nakamura in the Japanese version, and Steve Staley in the English dub.

Tsaolon's partner is Gensou (玄宗, Gensō), a martial artist who always craves for battle to test his mettle. Unlike the other humans, Gensou was never brainwashed by Zofis, with whom he chose to consort to satisfy his own wants.^{Ch. 130} Even after Tsaolon's defeat, Gensou refuses to yield and fights both Wonrei and Li En hand-on-hand but is quickly subdued.^{Ch. 133} Gensou is voiced by Nobutoshi Kanna in the Japanese version, and Liam O'Brien in the English dub.

==== Demolt and Roberto Vile ====
Demolt (デモルト, Demoruto) is the last of the Four Supreme Mamodo, as well as the largest and most powerful of the ancient Mamodo that Zatch and his allies face.^{Ch. 147} He wears a hugely dense metal armor used for much of his spells. One spell, deemed the "forbidden spell" by Zofis, reinforces his armor but causes him to go feral.^{Ch. 154} Because of his sheer size and primal instincts, Demolt is reputed as the "Crazed Warrior Berserker". Demolt stands guard by the Stone of Moonlight inside the central chamber of the ruins. As Demolt is basked in the light from the artifact, any damage dealt on him is instantly healed, a position that gives him a substantial edge above Zatch and company. Zatch and Laila combine forces, with Laila using her spells to keep Demolt occupied, while Zatch gains a spell that turns pieces of Demolt's armor brittle, making him more prone to hits.^{Ch. 155} At the precipice of the battle, Penny overtakes Demolt to shatter the Stone of Moonlight, helping Zatch complete the objective.^{Ch. 153} Wonrei, whom Demolt almost kills, then ousts him.^{Ch. 157} Demolt is voiced by Ryūzaburō Ōtomo in the Japanese version, and Fred Tatasciore in the English dub.

Demolt's partner is Roberto Vile (ローベルト・ヴァイル, Rōberuto Vairu), a depraved man. Rather than subjecting Roberto to mind control, Zofis promised to reward him with the Stone of Moonlight so that he could take control of human minds and make them do his bidding. After the stone's destruction, Roberto casts Demolt's forbidden spell in a panic, defying Zofis' orders, causing Demolt to devour him whole.^{Ch. 154} Roberto is freed from the intestines when Demolt's body fades out around him.^{Ch. 157} Roberto is voiced by Issei Futamata in the Japanese version, and Steve Blum in the English dub.

=== Past combatants ===
==== King Dauwan Bell and Willy ====
Dauwan Bell (ダウワン・ベル, Dauwan Beru) is the sitting king of the Mamodo world and father of Zatch and Zeno. His spells are based on lightning. Dauwan assumed the throne after succeeding in the Mamodo tournament 1,000 years ago,^{Ch. 323} a reign that would end with Zatch's eventual triumph in the next tournament cycle.^{Side} Dauwan passed the power of Bao to Zatch at his birth, over Zeno's protestation,^{Vol. 27} before sending him to live elsewhere out of fear for how that power might be handled.^{Ch. 272} Dauwan is seen in flashbacks in both the manga and anime.

Dauwan's partner was Willy (ウィリー, Wirī).

==== Goren of the Stone and Maurice ====
Goren of the Stone (石のゴーレン, Ishi no Goren) was a participant of the previous Mamodo tournament.^{Ch. 139} His spells involve light beams. One of these spells petrifies his targets; this is how the forty Mamodo commanded by Zofis were fossilized into stone tablets. One millennium later, Zofis replicates Goren's spell to reverse the effects and free the Mamodo.^{Ch. 103} Goren was eliminated by Dauwan. Goren is voiced by Keijin Okuda in the Japanese version, and Wally Wingert in the English dub.

Goren's partner was Maurice (モーリス, Mōrisu). He is voiced by Hideo Watanabe in the original version, while Crispin Freeman provides his voice for the English dub.

== Minor characters ==
Unlike the above, these human characters are not paired with Mamodo.

=== Naomi ===
Naomi (なおみ) is a young girl with pigtails and oversized teeth that are always clenched,^{Ch. 7} a trait her parents also share. She delights in roughhousing and vexing Zatch at the playground, though in a one-shot omake of the manga's last volume, she is revealed to be in love with Zatch.^{Vol. 33} Naomi is voiced by Shihomi Mizowaki in the Japanese version, and Michelle Ruff in the English dub.

=== Seitaro Takamine ===
Seitaro Takamine (高嶺清太郎, Takamine Seitarō) is Kiyo's distant father and professor at a university in England.^{Ch. 40} He found Zatch at the forest and immediately delivered him to Kiyo,^{Vol. 1} setting forth the events of the series. Zeno uses Seitaro as a bargaining chip in a doomed bid to go after Zatch.^{Ch. 45} Seitaro gives Kiyo the stone tablet bearing Pamoon,^{Ch. 83} which is later stolen by Zofis. Seitaro is voiced by Ryōtarō Okiayu in the Japanese version, and Phil Hayes in the English dub.

=== Hana Takamine ===
Hana Takamine (高嶺華, Takamine Hana) is Kiyo's stay-at-home mother.^{Ch. 1} In the anime, Hana states that she views Zatch as her adopted son.^{Ep. 108} Hana is voiced by Wakana Yamazaki in the Japanese version, and Leslie Carrara in the English dub.

=== Kory ===
Kory, or Sekkoro (セッコロ) in the Japanese release, is an English boy who comes across Zatch after snatching Kiyo's baggage in London.^{Ch. 40} He has made floundered attempts to rescue his mother and father from the grips of Baltro and Steng, and points Zatch and Kiyo over to them. He distracts Baltro to help Zatch turn the tide in the onslaught against the opponent and is reunited with his parents.^{Vol. 5} Kory is voiced by Yūko Mita in the Japanese version, and Yuri Lowenthal in the English dub.

=== Professor D'artagnan ===
Professor D'artagnan (プロフェッサー・ダルタニアン, Purofessā Darutanian; or ダルタニアン教授, Darutanian-kyōju), or simply Dartagnan, is an outlandish professor and Seitaro's coworker whose hobby is cosplay.^{Ch. 40} Dartagnan leads Zatch and Kiyo to discover where the former was attacked by Zeno in the months prior to meeting Kiyo, thus helping Zatch unlock Bao Zakeruga.^{Ch. 47–48} Dartagnan is voiced by Tesshō Genda in the Japanese version, and Wally Wingert in the English dub.

=== Li Akron ===
Li Akron, known as Li Paklong (リィ・バクロン, Ryi Bakuron) in the Japanese release, is Li En's father and patriarch of a criminal triad organization.^{Ch. 71} Li Akron disapproved of Wonrei's relationship with her daughter, proclaiming the Mamodo as unhuman and ordering their separation by imprisoning him on an island controlled by the triad. However, he softens his stance after witnessing Wonrei's determination to protect Li En once Zatch and Kiyo have rescued the Mamodo from captivity.^{Ch. 74} Li Akron is voiced by Jun Hazumi in the Japanese release, and Michael McConnohie in the English dub.

=== Jill ===
Jill (ジル, Jiru) is Kyle's perverse and overbearing caretaker.^{Ch. 178} Jill was a valet for the mansion of Kyle's father until his death, and she illegally claimed the home as her own. Jill forces Kyle to live in an unsanitary hut outside his mansion. Jill is voiced by Asako Dodo.

=== Kiyo's classmates ===
==== Suzy Mizuno ====
Suzy Mizuno, or Suzume Mizuno (水野 鈴芽, Mizuno Suzume) in the Japanese release, is Kiyo's schoolmate and closest thing to a friend in contrast to other students from the start of the series.^{Ch. 1} She is a self-ascribed klutz and often easily sidetracked. She has an overt crush on Kiyo and becomes jealous when other girls associate with him. For instance, she is a fan of Megumi and snaps when learning that she and Kiyo are close friends.^{Ch. 35, 168} Suzy also freely admits to have trouble with various academic topics, particularly mathematics.^{Ch. 56} Her hobby is drawing faces on fruits and other round items to objectify her emotions.^{Ch. 12} She is the subject of the omake of each volume called Gash & Suzume. Suzy is voiced by Tomoko Akiya in the Japanese version, and Colleen O'Shaughnessey in the English dub.

==== Kane ====
Kane, or Takeshi Kaneyama (金山剛, Kaneyama Takeshi) in the Japanese release, is a lumbering former schoolyard bully, who's interested in catching dinosaurs (or tsuchinoko in the Japanese version).^{Ch. 1} He is voiced by Wataru Takagi in the Japanese version, and Crispin Freeman in the English dub.

==== Yamanaka ====
Yamanaka, or Hiroshi Yamanaka (山中浩, Yamanaka Hiroshi) in the original, is a competitive sports enthusiast.^{Ch. 4} Yamanaka is voiced by Kazunari Tanaka in the Japanese version, and Dave Wittenberg in the English dub.

==== Iwajima ====
Iwajima, or Mamoru Iwajima (岩島守, Iwashima Mamoru) in the original, is a short student obsessed with UFOs.^{Ch. 21} In the manga, Kiyo ascribes him as a "very interesting guy". Iwajima is voiced by Yūsuke Numata in the Japanese version, and Crispin Freeman in the English dub.

==== Marylou ====
Marylou, known as Mariko Nakamura (仲村マリ子, Nakamura Mariko) in the original, is a spunky student and Suzy's best female friend.^{Ch. 4} She is voiced by Yukiko Hanioka in the Japanese version, and Michelle Ruff in the English dub.
