= Zatch Bell! season 2 =

Season of anime series

Zatch Bell!
- Season 2
- The cover of the thirteenth DVD compilation for season two of Konjiki no Gash Bell!! released by Shogakukan on April 19, 2006.
- No. of episodes: 50

Release
- Original network: Fuji Television
- Original release: April 4, 2004 – March 27, 2005

Season chronology
- ← Previous; Season 1 Next → Season 3

The second season, titled level 2, of the Zatch Bell! anime series was directed by Tetsuji Nakamura and Yukio Kaizawa and produced by Toei Animation. Based on the manga series by Makoto Raiku, the season follows the Mamodo Zatch Bell and his human partner Kiyo Takamine as they stand against the devious Mamodo Zofis and a legion of past-generation Mamodo. The second season of the TV series, known formally as Konjiki no Gash Bell!! (金色のガッシュベル!!, lit. "Golden Gash Bell!!"), ran from April 4, 2004, to March 27, 2005, on Fuji TV. The season adapts volumes 11 through 18 of the manga, (Note: Tankōbon edition.) and features several self-contained story arcs and an episode special.

Viz Media licensed the anime for the English dub, which aired on Cartoon Network's Toonami in the United States and on YTV's Bionix in Canada starting April 1, 2006. The season ran for twenty-seven episodes on Cartoon Network until the series' cancellation at #77 on January 20, 2007, although YTV aired the entirety of the season, finishing on November 1, 2008. The episodes were collected into seventeen DVD compilations by Shogakukan and released between May 18, 2005, and June 21, 2006. The dubbed episodes of this season, along with the first season's, were collected in a DVD box set by New Video Group and released on December 3, 2013.

Six pieces of theme music are used during the season: one opening theme and three closing themes in the Japanese episodes; two opening and one closing theme in the dubbed episodes. The Japanese opening theme used throughout is "Kimi ni Kono Koe ga Todokimasu yō ni" (君にこの声が届きますように, lit. "Let this Voice Reach You") by Takayoshi Tanimoto. The first Japanese ending theme is "Stars" by King, used up to episode 58; the second ending theme is "Tsuyogari" (つよがり, lit. "Bluff") by Eri Kitamura, used up to episode 75; and the third is "Idea" by Tsukiko Amano for the remaining episodes. The opening theme in the English airing of the season is "Follow the Light," excluding the first two episodes (51 and 52) in which "Zatch Bell! Theme" is used, with an instrumental version of the latter chosen as the closing theme throughout—the three themes were composed by Thorsten Laewe and Greg Prestopino.

== Summary ==
A guileful Mamodo named Zofis has gathered a set of thousand-year-old stone tablets, including one Kiyo obtained beforehand, and resurrect the Mamodo trapped within them to fashion an army for his own deeds. Zofis also subverts the hearts of humans to partner them up with the Mamodo—he has even corrupted his own partner Koko into doing his bidding. Zatch and Kiyo witness Zofis' machinations firsthand and attempt to hinder him, but he and Koko flee with their army.

Dr. Riddles and Kido soon pinpoint Zofis to an ancient ruin in South America and send Kiyo and Zatch there to confront him. They are joined by Riddles and Kido themselves, along with Megumi and Tia, Folgore and Kanchomé, Sunbeam and Ponygon, and Li-en and Wonrei; all whom Riddles had rallied for the attack. Following an initial setback, the team raids Zofis' hideaway and defeats the first wave of thousand-year Mamodo, but an ambush by Zofis forces them to scatter. The divided team encounters stronger adversaries, and Riddles loses Kido in the midst of their battle. Sherry and Brago then arrive and engage Zofis in an effort to extricate Koko from his clutch.

Zatch and his allies reunite by the Stone of Moonlight, the source of Zofis' powers, which is guarded by the thousand-year Mamodo Demolt whose sheer size and strength prove formidable for the protagonists. However, several of Zofis' minions; Penny, Byonko, and the thousand-year Mamodo Laila; defect to Zatch and help him vanquish Demolt and destroy the stone. This weakens Zofis, giving Sherry and Brago the upper hand against him. Zofis finally capitulates and loosens his grip on Koko, who is then nursed back to health at a hospital. Content at the outcome, Sherry and Brago send Zofis back to the Mamodo world, while Zatch, Kiyo, their friends, and the liberated humans head home, yet Riddles senses that an even greater danger is imminent.

== Episode list ==
All episodes are directed by Tetsuji Nakamura and Yukio Kaizawa.

No. overall	No. in season	English dub title / Japanese-translated title	Original release date	English air date
51	1	"The Masked Mamodo" / "Assault!! The Masked Devil Lord"; Transliteration: "Kyōshū!! Kamen no akuma Rōdo" (Japanese: 強襲!! 仮面の悪魔ロード)	April 4, 2004	April 1, 2006
In a cave, a masked Mamodo stares at his collection of stone tablets. The Mamodo then shines light on the stone tablet and releases three Mamodos from there. Elsewhere, Brago and Sherry defeat the final weak Mamodo and continue their hunt for Zofis. Kiyo and Zatch receive an invitation, from a hypnotized Suzy Mizuno, to go to a party hosted by Milordo-Z. Realizing that this has to do with the Mamodo battles, they head to the location. Once there, Milordo-Z reveals that he wants to recruit Zatch to be his companion in the Mamodo battle and offers him three mind-controlled slaves and three Mamodos in return. Kiyo and Zatch are angered by the way Milordo-Z treats humans and prepare to battle him. Milordo-Z uses his mind-controlled minions to attack while he leaves with his book owner. After Zatch burns the books of the three mind-controlled Mamodos, they leave the mansion, now in ruins, and Zatch promises to stop Milordo-Z from becoming the Mamodo king.
52	2	"My Beloved Zatch" / "My Beloved Gash! I am Patie!"; Transliteration: "Itoshi no Gasshu! Watashi wa Pati!" (Japanese: 愛しのガッシュ! 私はパティ!)	April 11, 2004	April 8, 2006
Kiyo's school is getting a usual physical checkup, and Kiyo finds out that he is doing much better than last checkup. His friends decide to place a bet, so whoever wins in the course of the physical checkup, gets the loser's portion of lunch. Elsewhere, a Mamdo named "Penny" is telling her partner Uri about her love, Zatch. At that moment, she finds Zatch who reveals he does not know who she is. Penny angered by Zatch forgetting about their "love" chases him down. Zatch still chased by a rampaging Penny, finds Kiyo. Kiyo realizing she is a Mamodo leads her to an empty area at the school to battle. Kiyo tries to tell Penny that Zatch lost his memories but fails to do so. Penny and Uri begin their battle with Zatch and Kiyo.
53	3	"So Giaku, The Water Dragon of Rage!" / "Goddaaaaamn!! Suou Giakuru of Rage"; Transliteration: "Gaddeeeeemu!! Ikari no Suou Giakuru! (Note: The kanji given is "水龍" which translates to "suiryū", or "water dragon". The furigana reads "スオウ·ギアクル", the Japanese reading of the spell.)" (Japanese: ガッデーーーーム!! 怒りの水龍)	April 18, 2004	May 27, 2006
Kiyo and Zatch manage to survive Penny's attack. She tells Zatch if he apologises, she will forgive him and stop her attack. Zatch apologizes; Penny then asks Zatch if he likes her, and he replies he does not since he does not know her. This enrages Penny, and she begins to attack them again. Kiyo uses Rauzaruk in order for Zatch to get close enough to Penny to use Zakerga, but on the attempt, he realizes no spells can be used while Rauzaruk is in effect. Penny uses So Giaku which summons a water dragon, but Zatch's Bao Zakerga overpowers her spell. At that moment, a Mamodo named Byonko appears, revealing that he is recruiting Mamodos for a plan to wipe out the remaining Mamodos. The enemy then makes their escape. Penny meets Milordo-Z, who reveals that the stone tablets contain the Mamodos from the previous battle one thousand years ago. Milordo-Z reveals that a special kind of light will free the Mamodos and that Penny will lead them to defeat Zatch.
54	4	"Battle at the Park! Zatch vs. Kiyo!?" / "Park Fight! Gash vs. Kiyomaro!?"; Transliteration: "Kōen Faito! Gasshu tai Kiyomaro!?" (Japanese: 公園ファイト! ガッシュVS清麿!?)	April 25, 2004	June 3, 2006
Kiyo and Zatch are at the park playing. They decide to play a game of Kick the can, where the person who is "it" must protect their can and catch the other players who are hiding. Zatch is "it" and he must search for Kiyo, Suzy, and Ponygon. Zatch instead finds Kiyo's other friends and drags them into the game. Kiyo decides to be "it" and manages to find everyone but Zatch. Soon Zatch races against Kiyo to reach the can, but he is run over by Naomi and her toy car. As Kiyo's friends leave, Penny appears from the sky with her three mamodo minions, in order to burn Zatch's book. She reveals her minions are Mamodos from a thousand years ago.
55	5	"Penny's Revenge! Assassins on the Loose!" / "Patie Counterattacks!! When Assassins are Released"; Transliteration: "Pati Ribenju!! (Note: The kanji given is "逆襲", which means "gyakurushū", or "counterattack". The furigana reads "リベンジ", or "revenge".) Toki hanatareta shikyakutachi" (Japanese: パティ逆襲!! とき放たれた刺客たち)	May 2, 2004	June 10, 2006
Penny reveals that her three minions are a thousand-year Mamodos from the previous battle, to attack Kiyo and Zatch. Overpowered, Kiyo and Zatch lead them to a narrow alleyway and use "Bao Zakerga", but it is nullified by the Mamodo's attacks. Penny begins to explain the origins of the thousand-year Mamodos. She explains that a Mamodo named "Stone Goren" turned the Mamodos and their books into stone. When Milord-Z freed them, he found a way to get humans to read their books. By controlling their minds and hearts to match the book's wavelength, the humans then are able to read the spells from the book. Penny orders the Mamodo to deliver a final attack, but they are saved by Tia and Megumi Oumi's Seoshi.
56	6	"The Light of Hope, Saifogeo!" / "The Light of Hope, Saifojio"; Transliteration: "Kibō no Hikari, Saifojio" (Japanese: 希望の光·サイフォジオ)	May 9, 2004	June 24, 2006
Tia and Megumi reveal that Dr. Riddles called them to help Kiyo and Zatch. They then reveal their new spell Giga La Seoshi which traps an opponent in the barrier and causes any attack inside to be reflected. Tia and Megumi manage to burn one of the thousand-year Mamodo's books. They reveal their second new spell, Saifogeo, which heals Kiyo, allowing him to use spells. Using Bao Zakerga, Kiyo manages to burn a thousand-year Mamodo's book. Penny and the surviving thousand-year Mamodo decide to retreat. The defeated book owners regain their consciousness, but they have no memory of the time when they were controlled. A man gives Kiyo a small tile that will lead to Milordo-Z. Kiyo realizes that if they can find out where the tile came from, they can find Milordo-Z's location. Elsewhere, Byonko and four thousand-year Mamodos prepare to battle Brago and Sherry Belmont.
57	7	"Battle on the Sands: Brago vs. The Silent Rulers!" / "Battle of the Hot Sands: Brago VS The Three Silent Rulers"; Transliteration: "Netsu sa no tatakai Burago tai Sairento Rūrā (Note: The kanji given, "静寂の三闘士", translates to "Seijaku no san tōshi", or "Three Silent Fighters". The furigana reads "サイレント·ルーラー", or "Silent Ruler".)" (Japanese: 熱砂の闘い ブラゴVS静寂の三闘士)	May 16, 2004	July 1, 2006
Brago and Sherry meet Byonko and four thousand-year Mamodos. Three of the thousand-year Mamodos decide to fight Brago without the assistance of the others. Kiyo meanwhile is searching through books to find where the design of that tile is found. Brago and Sherry continue their battle. The three Mamodos use an attack creating an area where no sound is heard and where the air pressure is increased five-fold. The Mamodos gain the advantage, but with Sherry's help, Brago manages to defeat the Mamodos and burn their books. They realize that Milordo-Z is actually Zofis and continue their search for him.
58	8	"Defeat Milordo-Z! Each Person's Resolve!" / "Defeat Lord! Everyone's Determination"; Transliteration: "Datō Rōdo! Sorezore no ketsui" (Japanese: 打倒ロード! それぞれの決意)	May 23, 2004	July 8, 2006
Kanchome finds Dr. Riddles and his Mamodo Kido who reveal that Folgore is on his way. Kiyo continues his search in the books for the ruins where the tile came from, and Ponygon continues his search for his book owner. Megumi after school asks her manager for a break from her duties as an idol. Meanwhile, Ponygon's book is picked up by a man and the letters in the book change color. Kiyo finds the location of the ruins in a book. Kiyo then notices a letter (message), from Dr. Riddles, attached to Ponygon's back. The letter reveals that a detailed map of the Taeboro ruins is with the letter and that Dr. Riddles shall join them when he recruits a strong ally. Dr. Riddles is then seen with Li-en and Wonrei. When Kiyo, Zatch, and Tia attend Megumi's concert, she reveals to her fans that she will be taking a break.
59	9	"Charge into the Ruins! Kanchomé's Strategy!" / "Rush into the Deboro Ruins! Kanchomé's Great Strategy!!"; Transliteration: "Totsunyu Deboro iseki! Kyanchome dai sakusen!" (Japanese: 突入デボロ遺跡! キャンチョメ大作戦!!)	May 30, 2004	July 22, 2006
Kiyo, Zatch, Megumi, Tia, and Ponygon take a private plane, supplied by Apollo, to the Taeboro ruins in South America. After arriving at their destination, they meet up with Folgore and Kanchome who reveal that Dr. Riddles asked them to assist Kiyo at the ruins. Inside, they spot two Mamodos. Kiyo tells Kanchome to lure them to an isolated room to prevent them from calling to their allies. Kanchome succeeds by using "Poruk" and lures the two Mamodo to the room, where Kiyo and the others are waiting. As Kanchome dawdles in his success, a third Mamodo appears behind Folgore and Kanchome.
60	10	"The Labyrinth's Angry Torrent" / "Battlefield! The Labyrinth of Torrent"; Transliteration: "Kōhō! Gekiryu no rabirinsu (Note: The kanji given, "迷宮", translates to "meikyu", or "labyrinth". The furigana reads "ラビリンス", the English word "labyrinth".)" (Japanese: 攻防! 激流の迷宮)	June 6, 2004	July 29, 2006
Kanchome, Folgore, and Ponygon lead the third Mamodo away, as Kiyo, Megumi, Zatch and Tia continue their battle against Alm and Gelios. During the battle, Alm states that he is not mind-controlled and is merely fighting to vent out his anger for being trapped for a thousand years. Kiyo attempts to rush after the opponents' books but is encumbered. To prevent Zatch from using his spells, Gelios floods the chamber with water, nearly drowning the four in the process. Kiyo, Megumi, and their Mamodo escape by swimming through a hole left by Gelios, and they wind up in another drier chamber where the enemies catch up with them. Meanwhile, after defeating a thousand-year Mamodo, Brago and Sherry are approached by Dr. Riddles.
61	11	"Spell of Sorrow" / "One Thousand-Year Sorrow Spell"; Transliteration: "Issennen no kanashiki jubaku" (Japanese: 一千年の悲しき呪縛)	June 13, 2004	August 5, 2006
Folgore uses Koporuk to shrink Kanchome, who then sets the pursuing Mamodo's book alight with a matchstick, thus sending it back to the Mamodo world. Kiyo casts Rauzaruk and continue the battle with their opponents, but Zatch refuses to attack, insisting on stealing their books again. Gelios uses his strongest attack, but Zatch cancels it out with Bao Zakerga. At this point, Kiyo is too exhausted to cast more spells, leaving him and Zatch vulnerable; however, Megumi's quick thinking helps them defeat Alm and Gelios. As he begins ascending, Alm reveals that he in fact disliked fighting yet could not burn his book and return to the Mamodo world on his own because of Milordo-Z's sway over his book owner. Alm then wishes Zatch best of luck before he and Gelios return peacefully. Folgore and Kanchome then reunite with the others. Megumi directs the liberated humans to Apollo to be transported back to their native countries. The team decides to rest before continuing their journey.
62	12	"Impact of the V! Very Melon!" / "Impact of the V: Very Melon!!"; Transliteration: "Bui no Shōgeki Berīmeron!!" (Japanese: Vの衝撃 ベリーメロン!!)	June 20, 2004	August 12, 2006
The team finds an open terrace with a fresh water aqueduct and melons to eat. They decide to rest and recover their energy but are interrupted by the appearance of the Mamodo Victoream. Folgore, noticing how unintelligent Victoream is, tries to praise him in order to avoid a fight while everyone is exhausted from the previous battle. The plan works until Kiyo makes a mistake and angers Victoream. Folgore attempts to praise him again and offers him a melon. While Victoream is dancing to his "Very Melon" song, Zatch, Tia, Kanchome, and Ponygon attack him and manage to tie him up. Victoream escapes from his bondage and separates his head from his body. He starts to attack the team by firing his lasers at them. Victoream accidentally hits his body and ceases attacking. Kiyo realizes that they are at a disadvantage, as Megumi and Folgore will only able to use one more spell.
63	13	"Burrah! Victoream's Anger!" / "Buraaaa! Gentleman's Angry Chāguru"; Transliteration: "Buraaaa! (Note: The first "a" is small which represents the trilling "r" sound.) Shinshi ikari no Chāguru" (Japanese: ブルァアア!! 紳士怒りのチャーグル)	June 27, 2004	August 19, 2006
Victoream returns to his body, but his body tries to steal his own book. Kanchome is revealed to be disguised as his body in an attempt to get his book. Victoream returns to his real body and starts attacking the team. Kiyo uses Bao Zakerga in an attempt to cancel the attack but fails to do so. Kiyo comes up with a plan and asks Megumi to use Saifogeo. Kiyo then uses Bao Zakerga aimed towards the ceiling, but it is intercepted by Victoream's attack. Victoream notices that his book is on the floor and picks it up, but he also sees his partner holding his own book. He notices Kanchome's face on his partner's stomach and attacks him. Kanchome is revealed to be the book Victoream is holding and reveals he drew a face on Victoream's partner to trick Victoream into attacking his partner. The team now has his book, and Victoream makes a final request, to dance to his "Very Melon" song. Victoream returns to the Mamodo world. As the team prepares to return to town to rest, they are interrupted by the appearance of two more Mamodos.
64	14	"The Fierce Attack of Dalmos! The Battle on Top of the Sand!" / "Onslaught Dalmos! The Deathmatch on the Sand"; Transliteration: "Mōkō Darumosu! Sashō no Desumacchu (Note: The kanji given is "決死戦", which translates to "kesshisen", but is given in furigana as "デスマッチ", or "death match".)" (Japanese: 猛攻ダルモス! 砂上の決死戦)	July 4, 2004	August 26, 2006
The team runs away from the Mamodos Laila and Dalmos and end up in a room full of sand. Laila fires an attack at the wall and tells the team to escape. She then proceeds to attack Dalmos and realize that she is unable to because Milordo-Z's mind control prevents this from happening. Kiyo tells everyone to leave, while he helps Laila defeat Dalmos. He gives Tia Zatch's book and stays behind with Zatch. Ponygon is reluctant to leave Kiyo, but Kiyo thanks Ponygon for coming even though he is afraid of battles. Ponygon leaves just before the exit fills up with sand. Dalmos fires a drill into the centre of the room to create a whirlpool in the sand. Kiyo, Zatch, Laila, and her mind-controlled partner, Albert, are overwhelmed by Dalmos. As Kiyo is about to be absorbed into the whirlpool, Ponygon and his book owner appears.
65	15	"Ponygon's Lightning Speed!" / "Meru-Meru-Me~! Umagon Lightning Flash!!"; Transliteration: "Merumerume~! Umagon denkōsekka!!" (Japanese: メルメルメ〜! ウマゴン電光石火!!)	July 11, 2004	September 2, 2006
Ponygon's book owner uses a spell that gives Ponygon armor that increases his abilities. Ponygon knocks a pillar into the centre of the whirlpool, destroying the drill. Dalmos is the knocked into the centre of the whirlpool. Ponygon's book owner reveals his name to be Kafk Sunbeam and that Dr. Riddles introduced him to Ponygon knowing he was Ponygon's book owner. In the flashback, it is revealed that Ponygon was too afraid to battle. When asked why he came, even though Ponygon refused to battle, Sunbeam replies that he believed in Ponygon. Dalmos returns and continues to battle Ponygon. Dalmos gains the upper hand and traps Ponygon under his feet. Sunbeam manages to free Ponygon by blinding Dalmos with sand. Ponygon's book glows, revealing a second spell which provides Ponygon with better armor that includes a horn. Dalmos is defeated when Sunbeam burns his book.
66	16	"The Red Spell Book of Promise!" / "Protect! The Red Magic Book of Promise"; Transliteration: "Mamorinuke! Yakusoku no akai mahon" (Japanese: 守り抜け! 約束の赤い魔本)	July 18, 2004	September 9, 2006
Kiyo, Zatch, Sunbeam, and Ponygon are resting after defeating Dalmos. Laila returns with a moonstone which recovers everyone's strength. They then ride back on Ponygon to town. In town, Megumi, Tia, Folgore and Kanchome are staying with Apollo. They are then attacked by Byonko and thousand-year Mamodos. Unable to use spells, they all flee, and Tia is cornered by the Mamodos. She manages to go through a narrow alleyway and meets Wonrei, Li-en, Dr. Riddles, and Kido at the end. Wonrei and Li-en deal with the Mamodos, but Tia is caught in the claws of a bird-like Mamodo. As the Mamodo flies away, Kiyo, Zatch, Sunbeam and Ponygon appear. Ponygon jumps towards Tia, and Zatch reaches out for her with his hand.
67	17	"The Wonderful Majestic Twelve Return" / "The Wonderful Majestic Twelve"; Transliteration: "Subarashikikana Majosutikku Tōeribo" (Japanese: すばらしきかなマジョスティック12)	August 1, 2004	September 16, 2006
Zatch grabs onto Tia and climbs aboard the bird Mamodo and attacks it with Zakerga. After he saves Tia, Byonko organizes his minions into a battle formation. Dr. Riddles realizing that the position is too dangerous to attack, sends his Majestic Twelve to find an opening. All but one of the majestic twelve remains, Big Boing. Big Boing begins to drum her breasts, and Dr. Riddles attacks the Mamodo while they are distracted. Kiyo uses Rauzaruk and commands Zatch to grab and throw the Mamodo as far away as possible. One of the Mamodos remains and uses a spell that summons a giant man-eating plant. As Zatch is about to be devoured, the plant is destroyed by Wonrei. Dr. Riddles burns the books of the thousand-year Mamodos. Byonko and his partner then escape with the help of the bird Mamodo. Back at Apollo's residence, Dr. Riddles tells the group of Milordo-Z's real name Zofis, having learnt that from Brago.
68	18	"Tia's Plan to Confess!" / "Runaway!? Tio's Great Strategy to Confess!"; Transliteration: "Bōsō!? Tio no kokuhaku dai sakusen!" (Japanese: 暴走!? ティオの告白大作戦!)	August 8, 2004	September 23, 2006
Dr. Riddles reveals the information Sherry gave him about Zofis. Meanwhile, Tia tries to thank Zatch for saving her, but is constantly interrupted by Kido and Kanchome. She afterwards tries to tell Zatch while bandaging him up but ends up choking him while Megumi scolds her for wasting the bandage. Li-en comments how Megumi and Tia are true partners as they can understand each other through their eyes. Tia tries to convey her thanks by staring intensely into Zatch's eyes, but her stare causes Zatch to apologize, believing he has done something wrong. Li-en tells her that she should try conveying her feelings in an empty place. Tia drags Zatch around but is unable to find a place to be alone. She then runs off and is comforted by Megumi, who tells her that she wanted to find a perfect moment to thank Zatch. Zatch finds Tia outside, and Tia finally manages to thank Zatch. Everyone gets plenty of sleep in preparation for their mission.
69	19	"Zofis' Evil Desires" / "Defeat It! Evil Zofis' Ambitions"; Transliteration: "Gekihaseyo! Jaaku naru Zofisu no yabō" (Japanese: 撃破せよ! 邪悪なるゾフィスの野望)	August 15, 2004	October 7, 2006
Kiyo, Zatch, Megumi, Tia, Folgore, Kanchome, Sunbeam, Ponygon, Dr. Riddles, Kido, Wonrei, and Li-en begin their infiltration into the Taeboro ruins. The team manages to avoid the guards in the front and enter their way into the ruins. In the maze of the ruins, Kanchome is noticed by two Mamodo guards, and they pursue the team. The team manage to find the stairs out of the maze and Kiyo uses Zaker to seal the exit to the stairs. The team finds three Mamodos waiting for them and easily burn their books. They continue their pursuit, but Kiyo realizes it seems too easy. They end up in a room full of molten magma, and the only safe way to cross is a narrow stairway. While crossing, Zofis appears and begins to attack the structure supporting the stairs.
70	20	"The Four Supreme Mamodo!" / "Desperate Situation!! Stand Up, the Four Heavenly Kings"; Transliteration: "Zettaizetsumei!! Tachifusagaru Shitennō" (Japanese: 絶体絶命!! 立ちふさがる四天王)	August 22, 2004	November 4, 2006
The stairway collapses, and the team is divided into 3 groups of four: Kiyo, Zatch, Sunbeam, and Ponygon; Folgore, Kanchome, Dr. Riddles and Kido; and Megumi, Tia, Li-en, and Wonrei. Zofis decides to let the four supreme Mamodo deal with the team. Kiyo's group ends up in a room where stars are firing lasers at them, and the Mamodo who controls them is nowhere in sight. Folgore's group meets the supreme Mamodo Belgim E.O., who promises to let them pass if Folgore can entertain him. If he fails however, he will be killed by Belgim E.O.. Megumi's group meet the supreme Mamodo Tsao-Lon and his partner Gensou. Gensou reveals that he is not mind-controlled and that he joined Zofis in order to fight against strong enemies. Megumi's group is overwhelmed by Tsao-Lon and Gensou.
71	21	"The Roar of Rao Diboren!" / "If I Love You... The Sorrowful Roar of Raou Dibauren"; Transliteration: "Ai sureba koso... Unare kanashimi no Raou Dibauren (Note: The kanji given, "猛虎爆裂拳", translates to "mōko bakuretsu kobushi", or "exploding tiger fist". The furigana reads "ラオウ·ディバウレン", the Japanese reading of the spell.)" (Japanese: 愛すればこそ...うなれ哀しみの猛虎爆裂拳)	August 29, 2004	November 25, 2006
Wonrei tells everyone to stay back, while he prepares to fight alone. Megumi attempts to use "Giga La Seoshi" to deflect Tsao-Lon's attack, but Tsao-Lon's attack breaks through the barrier and injures Megumi and Tia. Wonrei is overpowered by Tsao-Lon and Gensou and attempts to use "Rao Diboren". Tsao-Lon's attack breaks through "Rao Diboren" and heads towards Li-en, Megumi, and Tia. Wonrei blocks the attack with his body. Li-en attempts to cast another spell, but she realizes she does not have the energy to do so. Megumi uses "Saifogeo" and Tia throws it through Li-en and Wonrei and heals them both. Wonrei uses "Rao Diboren" and burns Tsao-Lon's book. Gensou and Wonrei battle and Wonrei is the victor, powered by his determination to protect everyone.
72	22	"Sing for Your Lives! The Terrible Belgim E.O." / "Sing Sing! The Fearful Belgim E.O."; Transliteration: "Utae utae! Kyōfu no Berugimu Ī Ō" (Japanese: 歌え歌え! 恐怖のベルギム·E·O)	September 5, 2004	December 9, 2006
Folgore and Kanchome do his signature song and dance "Hey Hey Let's Dance all Day!" to entertain Belgim E.O.. After the performance, Belgim E.O. begins to attack them and reveals he enjoyed the performance very much. He then asks Folgore if he could sing with them. Belgim E.O. tries to sing and bites his tongue. Angered, he blames Folgore and begins his attack. However, Dr. Riddles does a magic trick and summons pigeons, astonishing Belgim E.O.. Elsewhere, Kiyo tries to figure out the mysteries of the stars, and he realizes that they react to sound. Belgim E.O. asks Dr. Riddles to perform another magic feat. Dr. Riddles instead gives Belgim E.O. a riddle realizing that if he does a magic trick, Belgim E.O. will ultimately try to do the same and will be angered when he fails. Belgim E.O. not amused with the riddle decides to give them one more chance. Dr. Riddles tricks Belgim E.O. into thinking that spinning around is fun. Belgim E.O. does so but ends up flying and hitting the ceiling. Angered he begins his attack and realizes that his partner is out of energy to cast spells. He asks her to refill her energy with a moonstone but is interrupted by Dr. Riddles and Kido's attack. Folgore's team prepares to battle Belgim E.O. and his weakened partner.
73	23	"Dr. Riddles, You'll Always Be My King!" / "Thank You, My King. Mikoruo Ma Zegaruga"; Transliteration: "Arigatō boku no ōsama Mikoruo Ma Zegaruga" (Japanese: ありがとう僕の王様 ミコルオ·マ·ゼガルガ)	September 12, 2004	December 9, 2006
Folgore's team battles against Belgim E.O.. They plan to have Kido distract Belgim E.O. while Folgore and Kanchome attempt to steal his book. During the battle, Belgim E.O. reveals that he is not attached to his chair, and uses it to injure Dr. Riddles. Dr. Riddles reminisces on how he met Kido. When Dr. Riddles was a surgeon, he was unable to save a young boy during his operation and thus isolated himself due to his guilt. Dr. Riddles sees the resemblance of the kid in Kido and decides to help him. During the battle, Dr. Riddles pushes Folgore and Kanchome away from Belgim E.Os. direction and is gravely injured. With Dr. Riddles unable to move, Belgim E.O. fires his strongest attack at Dr. Riddles. Kido takes the attack, but his book is burned in the process. Kido continues to distract Belgim E.O. and communicates with Dr. Riddles through the book with his heart. He thanks Dr. Riddles for all the fun times and tells him Dr. Riddles is his king. The book glows and Kido asks Dr. Riddles to use the final spell before he disappears. Using the new spell "Mikor Ma Zegaruga", Belgim E.O. is defeated and Kido disappears.
74	24	"Pamoon, the Celestial Warrior" / "The Flash Dance! The Lone Warrior Pamoon"; Transliteration: "Senkō ranbu! Kokō no senshi Pamūn" (Japanese: 閃光乱舞! 孤高の戦士パムーン)	September 19, 2004	December 16, 2006
Folgore, Kanchome, and Dr. Riddles continue their journey in the ruins. Elsewhere Kiyo realizes that stars become less accurate the further the noise is from the ceiling and that the stars rotate in a circle. Kiyo then jumps into the centre of the orbit and destroys the floor with Zakerga, It is revealed the supreme Mamodo Pamoon is their opponent. Kiyo uses Zaker on the book owner, but it is easily blocked by Pamoon's stars. Sunbeam tells Kiyo and Zatch to look into the enemy's eyes, instead of the stars, to dodge his attacks. Pamoon then asks Kiyo if he was the human who did weird things to him. Kiyo realizes that Pamoon was the stone tablet he bought. Pamoon, angered by Kiyo's past deed, continues his attacks. Kiyo asks him why did he side with Zofis if he was so powerful. Pamoon remembers seeing Zofis turning a Mamodo into stone again and tells Kiyo he will show the strength that fear creates.
75	25	"Free Yourself from a Thousand Years of Pain!" / "Perish! The Sealed Thousand Years. Memories of Humiliation"; Transliteration: "Uchikudake! Fūin sennen kutsujoku no kioku" (Japanese: 打ち砕け! 封印千年 屈辱の記憶)	September 26, 2004	December 16, 2006
During the battle, Pamoon reminisces on how he was turned to stone by Goren. Pamoon is about to deliver the final attack to Goren but is stopped when Goren holds up a little girl. Pamoon hesitates to attack, but the girl is revealed to be an illusion created by Goren. Goren had then grabbed Pamoon and turned him into stone. Now, Pamoon overpowers Kiyo's team. Zatch asks Kiyo to use Rauzaruk. Zatch talks to Pamoon and tells him he should not be afraid anymore and that he will be his friend. Zatch begins to overpower Pamoon with Rauzaruk. While fighting, Zatch tells Pamoon he lost his memory of the Mamodo world and was very lonely in the human world before he met Kiyo. Pamoon asks Zatch if he thinks he could defeat Zofis, to which Zatch responds that he must. Pamoon tells Zatch if he can survive his next spell, then maybe he has enough power to become king. Pamoon uses his strongest spell, and Zatch counters with Bao Zakerga.
76	26	"No Escape! The Wicked Zofis Returns!" / "No Escape! The Sneaky Zofis Returns!"; Transliteration: "Nigemichi nashi!! Hiretsu naru Zofisu sairin" (Japanese: 逃げ道なし!! 卑劣なるゾフィス再臨)	October 3, 2004	December 23, 2006
Bao Zakerga is beaten by Pamoon's spell. Zatch manages to hold onto Pamoon's spell with his body. Pamoon remembering Zatch's words ceases his attack, and his spell disperses. Pamoon uses his spell and creates a hole in the ceiling and levitates everyone to the top. Meanwhile, Megumi's team finds a secret passage in a hall and follows it. Once at the top, Zofis discovers Pamoon's treason and burns his spellbook as punnishment. Zofis then calls his army of thousand-year Mamodos to battle with Zatch and Ponygon. Penny and Byonko return on flying Mamodos and order the Mamodos to attack Kiyo and Sunbeam. As the attack is about to hit Kiyo and Sunbeam, they are saved by Brago's Ion Gravirei.
77	27	"The Return of Sherry and Brago!" / "Sherry's Noble Rondo. The Explosion Baberuga Gurabidon"; Transliteration: "Sherī kedakaki rondo (Note: The kanji given is "輪舞" ("rinbu"), which means "rondo". The furigana reads "ロンド", the English word "rondo".) sakuretsu Baberuga Gurabidon" (Japanese: シェリー気高き輪舞 炸裂バベルガ·グラビドン)	October 10, 2004	January 20, 2007
Sherry and Brago appear. Using Reis, Kiyo's team is knocked across the balcony. Sherry creates a line and tells Kiyo's team if they want to live, they will stay behind the line. Sherry and Brago combat the thousand-year Mamodo while knocking their bookowners across the line. Once all the book owners are across the line, Sherry and Brago use Baber Gravidon and defeat the remaining thousand-year Mamodos. She then leaves with Brago to face Zofis. Kiyo's team enters the room leading to the room containing the moonstone. A hole in the ceiling allows light from the moonstone, in the room above, to flow down, healing whoever bathes in the light. At that moment, Penny and Byonko appear and battle Kiyo's team. Folgore's team arrives and heals everyone with Kanchome's final moonstone piece. They attempt to run towards the moonstone light but are stopped by Laila.
78	28	"I Won't Go Back! Laila's Dark Solitude" / "I Won't Go Back! Laila's Lonely Darkness"; Transliteration: "Mō modoranai! Reira no kodoku na yami" (Japanese: もう戻らない! レイラの孤独な闇)	October 17, 2004	July 20, 2007
Kanchome uses "Poruk" to hide the team. They plan to recruit Penny to their side by getting Zatch to make up with her. It works until Penny asks Zatch about marriage, and he declines the proposal. Laila reveals that if she steps out of the moonlight, she will turn back to stone. Kiyo tells her that Zofis cannot turn anyone into stone, proven when Zofis had burned Pamoon's book instead of turning him to stone. Kiyo realizes that Zofis was implanting illusions of petrification for the thousand-year Mamodos and informs Laila. He tells her the moonstone is also a tool used by Zofis to psychologically control the Mamodos and is used with Zofis' mind-control ability. Laila attempts to leave the moonlight, but she finds her hand turning to stone. She admits she knows it's an illusion and leaves the moonlight. Laila's mind believes she has become petrified and her body becomes petrified. Her mind-controlled partner, Albert sheds a tear, freeing Laila from Zofis' illusion.
79	29	"The Last of the Four Supreme Mamodo" / "The Bewildering Devil: The Last of the Four Heavenly Kings Appears"; Transliteration: "Ugomeku akuma saigo no shitennō tōjō" (Japanese: うごめく悪魔 最後の四天王登場)	October 24, 2004	September 14, 2007
Laila tries to remember the secret passage to the room with the Moonstone. After remembering Zofis' song, she remembers that the door is behind the rightmost statue. Megumi's team meanwhile end up in a room with three statue heads. The heads demand the answer to a question in order to pass. The question is, "Who is the most beautiful?" The four of them want to say themselves but are unable to. Li-en ends up using a spell and destroying the statues. The team arrives at the moonstone room and are attacked by the Mamodo there. Megumi runs out of energy and loses consciousness during the battle. Wonrei attempts to protect her and is stabbed through the stomach by the Mamodo. Kiyo's team arrives and sees the giant Mamodo.
80	30	"The Crazed Warrior: Berzerker!" / "The Wild Beast Demolt! A Trembling Roar"; Transliteration: "Yaju Demoruto! Senritsu no otakebi" (Japanese: 野獣デモルト! 戦慄の雄叫び)	October 31, 2004	September 21, 2007
Kiyo finds Tia and Megumi have lost consciousness, and Wonrei is gravely injured. The Mamodo, Demolt, aims his attack at Megumi and Tia but is interrupted by Laila. Megumi and Tia regain consciousness and use Saifogeo in an attempt to save Wonrei's life. Continuing the battle against Demolt, Zatch and Ponygon attempt to distract him, while Laila aims for the moonstone above, but Demolt intercepts the attack. Elsewhere, Sherry and Brago continue their pursuit on Zofis. Zofis puts on a helmet that emits a protective barrier around him, making the attacks futile. Laila notices that Demolt is too smart and concludes that his book owner is not controlled by Zofis. The book owner reveals himself to be Roberto Vile, and that Zofis promised him the moonstone if he helps him become king. He plans on using the moonstone to brainwash people into doing his bidding. Kiyo and Zatch, angered by the man's evil goal, know they must not lose the battle.
81	31	"Victory At Any Cost!" / "Seeking the Light... Jump Forth, the Two Fighting Spirits"; Transliteration: "Hikari (Note: The kanji given, "勝機", translates to "shōki", or "way to victory"; the furigana reads "ひかり", which means "hikari", or "light".) wo motomete... wakiagare futari no tōshi" (Japanese: 勝機を求めて...湧きあがれふたりの闘志)	November 7, 2004	September 28, 2007
Zatch and Ponygon continue their battle against Delmolt. Zatch uses Zakerga during the battle, but Delmolt's wounds recover from the moonstone instantly. Laila once again tries to destroy the moonstone with an attack, but the attack is intercepted by Delmolt. A Zakerga hits Delmolt behind his neck and causes him to flinch. Delmolt increases his power and continues to overwhelm Zatch and Ponygon. Elsewhere, Brago is unable to harm Zofis due to his barrier. He mentions that if the moonstone in the tower is destroyed, his barrier, which is powered by a moonstone, will be broken. Brago replies that he will just attack the barrier until it is destroyed. Dr. Riddles realizes that Kiyo was using Zakerga to find Delmolt's weak point and was depleting his energy to power up Bao Zakerga. Zatch aims Bao Zakerga at the back of Delmot's neck, but Delmolt still survives and continues his attack. At that moment, Penny arrives and saves Zatch.
82	32	"Selfish Penny's Goodbye" / "Selfish Patie. Suou Giakuru's Goodbye!!"; Transliteration: "Wagamama Pati Sekibetsu no Suou Giakuru!!" (Japanese: わがままパティ 惜別のスオウ·ギアルク!!)	November 14, 2004	October 5, 2007
With Penny's water spells combined with Zatch's lightning spells, they are able to gain the advantage against Delmolt. It is revealed that Delmot was only using his weak spells, and when he uses a stronger spell, he knocks Kiyo, Zatch, Sunbeam and Ponygon out. Penny battles Delmolt and Byonko regrets assisting Zatch while Alvin is unable to cast spells. Alvin reveals that he purposely did not cast spells because Byonko was sided with the evil Zofis. Alvin tells Byonko he will help him fight Delmolt. Tia uses Saifogeo to heal the unconscious members. Delmolt uses an attack that causes Byonko's book to burn, and Penny's book catches fire. Penny manages to destroy the moonstone but sacrifices her pigtails in the process. As she is about to be killed by Delmolt, Zatch saves her. Penny asks Zatch and his friends to befriend Byonko, and she says that she will be okay. As Penny returns to the Mamodo world, Zatch tells her that she and Byonko are their friends too.
83	33	"Zagurzem, the 7th Spell!" / "Deliver the Heat! The 7th Spell Zaguruzemu!!"; Transliteration: "Atsuki omoi yotodoke! Dainana no jutsu Zaguruzemu!!" (Japanese: 熱き思いよとどけ! 第7の術ザグルゼム!!)	November 21, 2004	May 30, 2008
Elsewhere, Zofis's barrier is simultaneously destroyed along with the moonstone. Koko reveals herself to Sherry soon after. Albert collapsed when the moonstone was destroyed as Zofis' mind control had been broken. Roberto uses the spell which Zofis had barred him from using. The spell gives Delmolt armor that increases his power and consequently causes Zofis's spell on him to break. Delmolt, having regained his persona, swallows Roberto and begins to battle the team again. They are overwhelmed by Delmolt's strength but continue to fight. Touched by everyone's effort, Zatch is encouraged to continue fighting. Zatch's feelings cause the seventh spell to appear: Zagurzem. Using "Zagurzem", the attack makes contact with Delmolt's arm, causing it to give off a yellow glow. Zatch uses Zakerga and manages to destroy Delmolt's armor. Kiyo realizes that "Zagurzem" causes electrical energy to become stored in whatever it contacts with and when used with an electric spell, increases its power. Delmolt, having realized the effect of the spell, manages to avoid Zatch's attacks. Albert regains consciousness and casts Miberna Ma Migron which summons numerous crescent moons.
84	34	"The Final Battle with Demolt!" / "The Evil Beast Demolt's Final Battle"; Transliteration: "Kyōju Demoruto saishu kessen!!" (Japanese: 凶獣デモルト最終決戦!!)	November 28, 2004	June 6, 2008
The moons of Miberna Ma Migron are able to become nets, or explode on command, which causes Delmolt to lose balance. Once Delmolt has fallen over, then Kiyo casts Zagurzem which connects with Delmolt's head. After two Zagurzem attacks, then Delmolt orders his human partner to give him more energy. This causes Delmolt to become stronger once again. "Miberna Ma Migron" is unable to stall Delmolt long enough for Zagurzem to hit. As Delmolt is about to attack Laila, he is interrupted by Wonrei's Rao Diboren. Kiyo again casts Zagurzem and connects with Delmolt. Delmolt, realizing he will be defeated, attempts to fly away. Zatch on Ponygon manages to defeat Delmolt with Bao Zakerga. Wonrei retrieves Delmolt's book from his stomach and burns it. Roberto regains consciousness and runs away. Everyone is glad the battle is over, but Kiyo reveals that Zofis is still at large.
85	35	"Sherry and Koko: The Bond that Can't Be Broken!" / "Sherry's Straying Bond that Can't Be Broken!"; Transliteration: "Mayoeru Sherī tachikirenu kizuna!" (Japanese: 迷えるシェリー断ち切れぬ絆!)	December 5, 2004	June 13, 2008
Sherry and Brago continue their battle with Zofis. Koko begins telling Sherry that she always hated her for their difference in social status. Koko reminds Sherry of the incident during her tenth birthday party. Back then, a burglary occurred, and Sherry's family heirloom was stolen. Since Sherry's handkerchief was at the scene of the crime, Sherry was blamed for it. Koko revealed she planted the handkerchief there and shows Sherry she has the heirloom. Sherry is devastated and is unable to cast spells, resulting in a grave injury for Brago. Brago continues to fight Zofis without spells. Sherry seeing Brago fighting a losing battle, offers to give Zofis Brago's book to burn, but Zofis refuses, as he wants to kill Brago. Sherry's ring breaks and reminds her of the past friendship she had with Koko. Koko in the past gave her two rings, with the design of the sun and moon, which will ward off evil. Sherry notices that Koko is wearing the earrings with the same sun-and-moon design and realizes that Koko is waiting to be saved by Sherry. Sherry regains the will to fight and is able to cast spells again.
86	36	"Zofis Strikes Back: The Final Showdown of Friendship!" / "Zofis Strikes Back: The Final Battle of Friendship!!"; Transliteration: "Gyakushū no Zofisu Yūjō no saishu kessen!!" (Japanese: 逆襲のゾフィス 友情の最終決戦!!)	December 12, 2004	June 27, 2008
Zofis aims his attacks at Sherry and injures her leg. He then destroys the ground they are on and sends them into the crack in the mountain. Zofis prepares to leave, but he is interrupted by the appearance of the team; Laila and Albert, Wonrei and Li-en, Tia and Megumi, and Zatch, Kiyo, and Dr. Riddles. Zofis triggers a volcanic eruption while battling the team. The team manages to avoid the volcanic eruption while blocking Zofis' attacks. Zofis tells them they should give up because they are fatigued from the previous battle. Kiyo tells them that the feelings will give them the power they need to defeat Zofis. Kanchome uses "Poruk" to transform into a device that launches Ponygon with Kiyo and Zatch on his back. Kiyo tells Zofis that with their friends, they can make the impossible possible, and that they will defeat Zofis. Once close enough to Zofis, Kiyo throws Zatch towards Zofis.
87	37	"Save Koko! Sherry's Dioga Gravidon!" / "Save Koko! Sherry's Whole Body of Dioga Gurabidon!!"; Transliteration: "Omoi yo Koko ni todoke! Sherī konshin no Dioga Gurabidon!!" (Japanese: 思いよココに届け! シェリー渾身のディオガグラビドン!!)	December 19, 2004	July 4, 2008
Zatch's Bao Zakerga breaks through Zofis' strongest attack and injures him. Kiyo prepares to finish Zofis off with Zakerga but is interrupted by Sherry and Brago. Sherry and Brago demand Kiyo and Zatch to leave Zofis to them. Zofis uses an attack that causes explosive energy to rain from the sky. While hiding, Sherry reveals to Kiyo about her friendship with Koko. They then compromise on who fights Zofis; Sherry and Brago will fight Zofis alone, if they are defeated, then Kiyo and Zatch will intervene and defeat Zofis themselves. Sherry and Brago gain the advantage against Zofis. Zofis attempts to use Koko to break Sherry's determination by ordering her to reveal the heirloom. Sherry tells Zofis the heirloom is a fake, to which Zofis accidentally confirms to be true. Zofis then orders Koko to jump into the magma, forcing Sherry to save Koko. As Sherry saves Koko, Brago and Zofis's strongest spells collide.
88	38	"A New Departure!" / "Sherry-Brago. A New Departure"; Transliteration: "Sherī Burago Aratanaru kadode" (Japanese: シェリー·ブラゴ 新たなる門出)	December 26, 2004	July 19, 2008
Brago's spell defeats Zofis's spell, and Koko is saved from falling into the magma. Zofis tells Sherry that once his book is burned, Koko will regain her persona but will retain the memories of all her evil deeds committed with Zofis. Hence, she will suffer from guilt until she will not have the will to live anymore. Sherry orders Zofis to erase Koko's memory but refuses. Zofis tells Brago that he has been afraid of Brago and has been running from him ever since. He threatens Zofis by asking him if he wants to run away for the rest of his life in the Mamodo world. Zofis agrees to Sherry's demands. Before leaving, Sherry tells Kiyo that the reason she wanted to fight Zofis alone was to make sure Zofis' book was not burnt, so Koko's memory could be erased. As the battle is over, Laila asks the team to burn her book as her Mamodo battle had ended a thousand years ago. She tells them one of them must become the Mamodo King before she disappears. Everyone thereafter return to their normal lives. Koko, who has no memories of the prior months, thanks Sherry for saving her, and they happily hug. Grateful for Brago, she tells him she shall make him the Mamodo King.
89	39	"A New Year's Special: The Magnificent Victoream Returns!" / "A New Year's Special: The Brilliant V Returns!!"; Transliteration: "Shinshun supesharu karei naru Bui yo futatabi!!" (Japanese: 新春スペシャル 華麗なるVよ再び!!)	January 9, 2005	July 26, 2008
It is the first day of the new year. Folgore and Kanchome come to Kiyo's house to tell him of a dream he had. In his dream, Victoream and his book owner scale a mountain and obtain the "Very Melon" spell, which grants him a wish from Makoto Raiku. Victoream wishes a movie could be made about him. Folgore wakes up and soon receives a call telling him he is a director of a movie. Folgore shares the ideas of the movie with Kiyo, Zatch, and Ponygon. His first idea involves the secret agent, Folgore, who combats the evil villains led by Victoream. His second idea involves Victoream and his servants Zatch, Tia, Ponygon, and Kiyo. His third idea is a journey where Victoream searches for V-shaped melons. His fourth idea involves Victoream battling Belgium E.O., whom he defeats with his new spell "Very Melon". Folgore finishes his story and realizes no one is listening. Kiyo, annoyed with Folgore, kicks him out of the house.
90	40	"The Hurricane Test Battle!" / "I'm Home... as Well as a Stormy Test Battle"; Transliteration: "Tadaima... soshite arashi no tesuto batoru" (Japanese: ただいま...そして嵐のテストバトル)	January 16, 2005	August 2, 2008
Kiyo heads to school, and Zatch tries to follow. Zatch accidentally gets his toy Vulcan stuck on a truck that drives away and chases after it. Suzy tries to tell Kiyo "Welcome back" but is constantly interrupted by Kiyo's friends. Meanwhile, the truck Zatch chases stops and drops its cargo which is revealed to be yellowfish. Kiyo's teacher, Mr. Touyama, gives everyone a test. Kiyo easily answers all the questions except for the final one. At that moment, Zatch crashes through the window, and Kiyo is forced to take Zatch out of the classroom, leaving the test unfinished. When the tests are graded, Kiyo is devastated to find out the last question was worth 30%. Touyama reveals that in Kiyo's absence, he has been teaching the class with random and trivia information in order to break Kiyo's perfect grade. He then tells Kiyo if he "apologizes", then he will tell Kiyo what shall be on the test tomorrow. Kiyo, instead, asks his classmates for their notes and creates study guides for the whole class to get 100%. The next day, Mr. Touyama's test contains questions about his personal life. At that moment, the principal arrives, due to Zatch and Ponygon, and when the principal reads the questions on the test, he orders Touyama to his office. As they head home, Suzy tells Kiyo "Welcome back".
91	41	"Naomi's Evil Plot" / "Naomi-chan's Pursuit"; Transliteration: "Naomi-chan wo tsuiseki seyo!!" (Japanese: ナオミちゃんを追跡せよ!!)	January 23, 2005	August 9, 2008
After Kiyo goes to school, Zatch volunteers to do the shopping for Kiyo's mother. Ponygon accompanies him, and on the way, he notices that the park has become a mess. One of the playground children notices Zatch and tells him it is his fault. Zatch presumes Naomi has plans to take over the park. Zatch and Ponygon follow Naomi to a department store to find out her plan. They meet Tia, along the way, who joins them. After buying some products, Naomi realizes she has been followed, so she tells one of the employees that Zatch, Tia, and Ponygon are lost children. The three are then chased down by store employees who want to take them to the lost-child centre. They later meet up with Kiyo and Megumi. Zatch heads to the park and confronts Naomi. Using the items she bought, she humorously overwhelms Zatch. Zatch prepares to go home and finds out Naomi has cleaned the park. Zatch arrives home and everyone is dismayed when Zatch confesses that he forgot to go shopping.
92	42	"Dr. Riddles' Renewed Vow" / "Kido of Our Heart. Dr. Nazonazo's Renewed Vow"; Transliteration: "Waga kokoro no Kido Nazonazo Hakase aratanaru chikai" (Japanese: 我が心のキッド ナゾナゾ博士新たなる誓い)	January 30, 2005	August 16, 2008
Zatch is making a new Vulcan 300 when Tia comes over. Elsewhere, Dr. Riddles is depressed over the loss of Kido. Folgore and Kanchome, while in America, decide to visit Dr. Riddles. Once there, the Majestic Twelve ask Folgore to help cheer up Dr. Riddles. Folgore plans to have Kanchome use "Poruk" and transform into Kido. Kanchome enters Dr. Riddles room and pretends to be Kido. Dr. Riddles notices that Kanchome is disguised as Kido and plays along. He speaks to Kanchome as if he is Kido and tells him the good times he had with Kido. He reminisces of the time he was recruiting people to help battle Zofis and his army of thousand-year Mamodos. Dr. Riddles is thankful for Folgore and Kanchome, and he tells Kanchome that Kido has had to return to the Mamodo world. The next day, Dr. Riddles meets with Apollo to share a concern between the human and Mamodo world.
93	43	"A Voice From Another World!" / "A Voice from Another World! Demons with Fate!!"; Transliteration: "Yisekai kara no koe! Unmei tsukita mamonotachi!" (Japanese: 異世界からの声! 命運つきた魔物たち!!)	February 6, 2005	September 6, 2008
In a mysterious place, a Mamodo stands above the symbol of a book and announces a message, to the contestants of the Mamodo battle, to assemble at the light. The next day, Zatch builds a weird structure out of rocks which Kiyo recognizes to be the same as those found in Asuka. Dr. Riddles calls Kiyo and tells him to investigate a structure in Asuka that emitted light the night before. Kiyo, Zatch, and Ponygon head to Asuka and find the structure. There, they meet a Mamodo named "Majirou" and his partner Nicholas whom they befriend. That night, light emits from the ruins, and Sherry and Brago are seen nearby. Nicholas and Majirou investigate the light, but they are attacked by Sherry and Brago, who burns their book. Kiyo, Zatch, and Ponygon arrive to see Majirou off. Zatch asks why they burned Majirou's book and prepares to fight Brago.
94	44	"The Door to a Different World! Brago vs. Zatch" / "The Door to a Different World! Gash VS Brago's Strongest Confrontation"; Transliteration: "Yisekai no tobira! Gasshu tai Burago saikyō taiketsu" (Japanese: 異世界の扉! ガッシュVSブラゴ最強対決)	February 13, 2005	September 13, 2008
Sherry reveals that Nicholas and Majirou attacked first. In a flashback, Brago calls Nicholas and Majirou weak and leaves, but counters when they attempt to attack him. Zatch angered by Brago, begins their battle. Zatch is at a disadvantage against Brago. Zatch uses Bao Zakerga and Brago uses Dioga Gravidon. Elsewhere, the Mamodo who made the announcement has been absorbing energy from the battle, and once there was enough energy, he opened a portal and dragged Kiyo, Zatch, Ponygon, Sherry, and Brago into the structure. The Mamodo who made the announcement reveals his name to be Maestro and reveals to Brago they are in the In-between World, a world between the Mamodo and Human world where Mamodo criminals are placed. Kiyo, Zatch, and Ponygon elsewhere also learn where they are, from a Mamodo in a nearby village. Maestro reveals a way for Sherry and Brago to return to the Human world and asks them to follow him.
95	45	"Attack of the Iron Army!" / "The Different World's Wandering! Attack of the Iron Corps!"; Transliteration: "Yisekai hōrō! Osoi kakaru tetsu no gundan" (Japanese: 異世界放浪! 襲いかかる鉄の軍団)	February 20, 2005	September 20, 2008
Maestro tells his servant to call Brago in to talk. He tells Brago how in the In-between World, Mamodos with spell books are able to cast spells without their human partners. He then asks Brago to join him. Elsewhere Kiyo, Zatch, and Ponygon search for a way to return home, when they come upon an army. The army led by Kurogane, requests the three to surrender and be taken to Maestro. Kiyo refuses, and the three battle against the army. During the battle, Kiyo realizes the Mamodo army are unable to cast spells and that they all have iron armor. Kiyo then casts "Jikerdor" and defeats the army. Kurogane manages to resist the magnetic pull of "Jikerdor" and continues the battle. Zatch defeats Kurogane soon after. They learn that Maestro lives in the castle at the North, and they decide to head there. Brago meanwhile tests to see if spells could be cast without a human partner reading the spell. Realizing it to be true, Brago takes the book and leaves Sherry.
96	46	"The Battle With Brago – Without Sherry!" / "The Different World Duel! Brago without Sherry"; Transliteration: "Yisekai kettō! Sherī no inai Burago" (Japanese: 異世界決闘! シェリーのいないブラゴ)	February 27, 2005	September 27, 2008
In the Human World, Dr. Riddles, Sunbeam, Folgore and Kanchome are at the structures, investigating them. In the In-between World, Kiyo, Zatch, and Ponygon arrive at the castle. They begin infiltrating the castle forcefully by attacking the guards in their way. Maestro tells Brago that to open the human portal, he must burn Zatch's book. Sherry tells Brago how she will help him fight, but he tells her to go back to her room. Kiyo, Zatch, and Ponygon meet Brago while infiltrating the castle. The three battle Brago, and Ponygon is injured in the process. Kiyo and Zatch continue their battle against Brago. When Brago is about to deliver the finishing blow, they are saved by Maestro's shield spell. Zatch uses Bao Zakerga to counter Brago's Dioga Gravidon which causes the portal to open. Maestro appears and tells them the portal to the Mamodo world has begun to open, and he plans to take revenge on it with the prisoners of the In-between World.
97	47	"Maestro's Revenge on the Mamodo World!" / "The Champion of the Different World! Maestro's Revenge"; Transliteration: "Yisekai no hasha! Fukushuu ni kibamuku Maesutoru" (Japanese: 異世界の覇者! 復讐に牙むくマエストロ)	March 6, 2005	October 11, 2008
Kiyo, Zatch, and Brago battle Maestro. Kiyo realizes that Maestro's power involves magnetism and that he is using the coils at the side of the battlefield to increase the powers of his spells. Kiyo attempts to destroy the magnetic coils with Zakerga, but he runs out of energy to cast spells. The three are overwhelmed by Maestro. Sherry arrives and reveals that Brago told her to go to her room so she could reserve her energy for the battle against Maestro. Sherry and Brago are able to push Maestro back but are unable to break his barrier spell. Kiyo proposes a temporary alliance against Maestro, but Brago is hesitant. Kiyo tells Brago that to open the door of the human portal, they would need the spells Bao Zakerga and Dioga Gravidon. They then team up to combat Maestro.
98	48	"The Decisive Battle in the In-Between World!" / "The Different World's Big Duel! Gash-Brago's Big Mysterious Explosion"; Transliteration: "Yisekai dai kettō! Gasshu Burago ni dai okugi sakuretsu" (Japanese: 異世界大決闘! ガッシュ·ブラゴ二大奥義炸裂)	March 13, 2005	October 18, 2008
Sherry and Brago continue their attack on Maestro's barrier in order to test the limits of the coil. They find out "Ion Gravirei" is the limit which the coils can handle. Kiyo casts "Zagurzem" and combined with "Ion Gravirei" breaks through Maestro's barrier. At that moment, the door to the Mamodo world is completely open. He offers Zatch and Brago a chance to join him, which they refuse. Zatch uses Bao Zakerga and Brago uses "Baber Gravidon" to attack Maestro. Maestro manages to hold the spells back until they combine to make a black Bao Zakerga which causes his defeat. Maestro explains that he was left in the In-between World when crossing to the human world for the Mamodo battle and feeling abandoned by the Mamodo world, plans to destroy it. Brago burns Maestro's book. Using Bao Zakerga and Dioga Gravidon, they are able to return home.
99	49	"Miss Wriggle's Class is Now in Session" / "The Love of Youth of Monmon-sensei. Kiyomaro's Tragic Defeat"; Transliteration: "Ai to seishun no Monmon-sensei Kiyomaro higeki no zanpai" (Japanese: 愛と青春のモンモン先生 清麿悲劇の惨敗)	March 20, 2005	October 25, 2008
Kiyo after managing to outwit Zatch and Ponygon goes to school. Once there, the teacher Touyama tries to give Kiyo a failing grade by asking him what is his cat's name. Kiyo manages to figure it out, but Touyama reveals he has a secret weapon. He introduces Miss Wriggle's who shall teach the class poetry. Miss Wriggle asks the class to make a poem that expresses their love sickness. Suzy does a poem on Kiyo, and everyone else does a poem about their favorite hobbies. Kiyo however was unable to make a poem to express his love sickness and fails. Everyone in the class becomes devastated believing it is the apocalypse. Touyama laughs happily as Kiyo receives his first failing grade, and Kiyo swears vengeance. They head home while Zatch and Ponygon are pursued by an angry Naomi.
100	50	"The Bagpipes of Sadness!" / "The Groper Folgore! The Bagpipes of Love and Sorrow"; Transliteration: "Mogeyo Forugore! Ai to kanashimi no bagupaipu" (Japanese: もげよフォルゴレ! 愛と悲しみのバグパイプ)	March 27, 2005	November 1, 2008
Nicolas is upset about Majirou's book becoming burnt. When he plays his depression through his bagpipes, it causes anyone who hears it to become sad too. Folgore volunteers to bring Nicholas to Italy to rid his sadness. Once there, Folgore shows Nicholas the merry town in Italy and tells him he must remember the good times he had with Majirou. Nicholas becomes upset and plays his bagpipes, causing people around him to cry in sorrow. Next, Folgore takes Nicholas to a forest and tells him to let nature wash away his grief but also fails. Folgore then attempts to get Nicholas to play his depression into a hole and trap it in there. The depression bursts out of the hole and causes the whole country of Italy to suffer a depression. Nicholas runs away once realizing what he has done to the country. Folgore meanwhile decides that to combat Nicholas's depression, he must combat the depression in Italy. Folgore starts to dance his famous song with his cheerful spirit but is overcome by the depression. Nicholas, seeing Folgore's spirit, remembers that his goal was to spread happiness with his bagpipes and proceeds to play a happy tune. This cancels the depression he caused in Italy, and he decides to continue playing to keep Majirou's memory alive.
