= Zatch Bell! season 3 =

Season of anime series

Zatch Bell!
- Season 3
- The cover of the sixteenth DVD compilation for season three of Konjiki no Gash Bell!! released by Shogakukan on February 21, 2007
- No. of episodes: 50

Release
- Original network: Fuji Television
- Original release: April 3, 2005 – March 26, 2006

Season chronology
- ← Previous; Season 2

The third and final season, titled level 3, of the Zatch Bell! anime series was directed by Tetsuji Nakamura and Yukio Kaizawa and produced by Toei Animation. Based on the manga series by Makoto Raiku, the Mamodo Rioh brings Faudo into the tournament, posing an existential threat to Zatch Bell, his human partner Kiyo Takamine, and all their friends; and Zatch confronts his begrudging twin brother Zeno Bell. The third season of the TV series, known formally as Konjiki no Gash Bell!! (金色のガッシュベル!!, lit. "Golden Gash Bell!!"), aired in Japan from April 3, 2005, to March 26, 2006, on Fuji TV. The season adapts volumes 18 through 22 of the manga. (Note: Tankōbon edition.) Toei proactively scripted a portion of the season's material as a delay resulted in the manga lagging behind the anime, producing a truncated plotline that is roughly parallel to volumes 23 through 29.

Shogakukan collected the episodes into seventeen DVD compilations released from July 7, 2006, to March 7, 2007. Only the first four episodes of the season were edited and dubbed in English, and they premiered on YTV's programming block Bionix in Canada from November 15, 2008, to December 6, 2008. The dubbing was provided by Viz Media. After the fourth episode (104th overall), the English broadcast of the show was discontinued, leaving the remainder of the series exclusive to Japan. Viz ceased the English translation of the manga series less than one year later after twenty-five volumes. The four dubbed episodes streamed on Crunchyroll in 2016.

Four pieces of theme music are used in the episodes: one opening theme and three closing themes in the Japanese episodes, and one opening and closing theme for the dubbed episodes. The Japanese opening theme throughout is "Mienai Tsubasa" (見えない翼, lit. "Invisible Wings") by Takayoshi Tanimoto. The first Japanese ending theme is "Kyou yori Ashita wa" (今日より明日は, lit. "Tomorrow will be better than today") by Echiura, used until episode 125; the second ending theme is "★Aso Fever 2005★" (★遊Fever 2005★, lit. "★Play Fever 2005★") by Tomoe Shinohara, used until episode 149; and the third is "Kasabuta" (カサブタ, lit. "Scab") by Hidenori Chiwata, used in the finale—this piece was also played as an opening theme during the first season of the series. For the English release, the opening theme is "Follow the Light," and the ending theme is the instrumental remix of "Zatch Bell! Theme"—both tracks were composed by Thorsten Laewe and Greg Prestopino.

== Summary ==
Set shortly after the events of the previous season, a kaiju-like superweapon called Faudo emerges on Earth from the Mamodo world. It was brought along by a seditious Mamodo named Rioh, who plots on utilizing it to win the Mamodo tournament while also risking carnage on the human world. However, because Faudo is in a hibernation-like state, Rioh requires spells of several Mamodo to power it up. He coerces these Mamodo into his allegiance by instilling a curse on their human partners, including Li-en, that will kill them if Faudo is not reanimated in time.

With newer allies, Zatch, Kiyo, and their friends mount an all-out offensive on Rioh upon learning about his scheme. They manage to break his curse, saving Li-en and the affected humans, but are unable to prevent Faudo's release. When Kiyo's plan to stall the giant fails, Rioh sends it toward Japan to test its capacity, resulting in a frenetic clash between Zatch's allies and Rioh's forces during which Wonrei is sent back to the Mamodo world. At the height of the conflict, Zatch's twin brother Zeno Bell and his partner Dufort dispatch Rioh and take control of Faudo, with Dufort desiring to use it to wipe out humanity. Despite their numbers, Zatch and his allies are grossly surpassed by Zeno's spells and Dufort's telepathic ability. However, a miracle entity within Zatch arises, allowing him to overcome Zeno and return him to the Mamodo world, but not without losing control of Faudo. Zatch and Kiyo take the matter into their own hands and use this newfound power to destroy Faudo just off the shores of Japan, saving the world from doom.

In the season epilogue, Zatch and Brago, now the only Mamodo left on Earth, are about to battle each other for the crown of their world, but the series ends before a true winner is determined.

== Production and release ==
While airing the second season of Zatch Bell!, Fuji TV renewed the series for the third season. Toei Animation handled the animation of the season with Tetsuji Nakamura and Yukio Kaizawa continuing their posts as co-directors of the anime. Actress Ikue Ōtani, the Japanese voice of Zatch, left production for maternity leave after 140 episodes and was replaced with Konami Yoshida. Season 3 aired from April 3, 2005, to March 26, 2006, for 50 episodes, with the final two (episodes 149 and 150) debuting back-to-back in a one-hour slot.

Season 3, like the previous seasons, is adapted from the Zatch Bell! manga, but some episodes were broadcast before the corresponding chapters were released. Author Makoto Raiku paused the manga to recover from a hand injury he sustained while writing the pages for volume 23. Toei was unwilling to wait out the disruption and turned to raw outlines sent early on to create its own storyline. By the time the season neared the conclusion, Raiku had resumed the manga, while Toei began shifting its resources toward other anime projects, precluding additional episodes beyond this season. Thus, the finale's post-credits closing scene with Zatch and Brago urges viewers to finish reading the manga to find out who wins the tournament.

After the third season concluded, Raiku rewrote the struggle over Faudo as he was dissatisfied with the storyline approach in Toei's fillers. For example, Raiku retconned a psychic element named the Answer Talker into the manga; Kiyo obtains the Answer Talker after Rioh nearly kills him. However, Raiku also balanced the story. Zeno gives up his bid for the crown with compunction for battling Zatch, contravening the season in which Zeno tries to kill Zatch by inflicting certain apocalypse on Earth. Faudo's fate was also lightened from the anime: Zatch's strongest spell lifts it back into the Mamodo world rather than annihilates it.

In Japan, Shogakukan, the publisher of Zatch Bell!, licensed Pony Canyon to distribute season 3 through seventeen DVD compilations from July 7, 2006, to March 7, 2007, under the subtitle "level 3". Viz Media provided the English dub for only the first four episodes of the season (episodes 101-104), which aired on YTV's programming block Bionix in Canada from November 15, 2008, to December 6, 2008. This comes after Cartoon Network removed the series from its TV lineup in the United States midway through the previous season. By 2008, Viz stopped adapting the anime as Raiku had pulled out of Shogakukan, so the season would be incomplete for English-speaking audiences. This was likewise due to the fact that Shogakukan owns a stake in Viz, and that Raiku's departure meant that his manga would no longer be available outside Japan after volume 25. In 2016, the season's dubbed episodes were added to the streaming service Crunchyroll along with the previous one hundred episodes.

== Episode list ==
All episodes are directed by Tetsuji Nakamura and Yukio Kaizawa.

No. overall	No. in season	English dub title / Japanese-translated title (Note: Titles for episodes 105 (5th in season) onward are Japanese-translated.)	Original release date	English air date
101	1	"A New Menace: The Boy that Speaks to the Wind!" / "A New Menace. The Boy that Speaks to the Wind. Baou Obliterated!"; Transliteration: "Aratanaru kyōi Kaze wo gataru shōnen Baou massatsu!" (Japanese: 新たなる脅威 風を語る少年 バオウ抹殺!)	April 3, 2005	November 15, 2008
An ominous tower the height of Mount Fuji spontaneously rises somewhere on Earth, with Zeno Bell looking on in shock. In Japan, a nomad named Jido and his Mamodo Ted arrive at Mochinoki, hometown of Zatch's bookowner Kiyo Takamine, looking for a job to pay for lodging. Ted wanders into the park and finds a cardboard box with Zatch sleeping inside it. They get into a quarrel over the box, but it quickly resolves into a mutual friendship. Before long, Jido finds Ted and scolds him for being sidetracked, yet accepts Zatch's invitation to stay at Kiyo's house. Jido confides with Zatch that Ted has a different ambition than becoming king of the Mamodo world. That evening, a sword-wielding Mamodo named Arth and his partner, 7-year-old Ellie, challenge Zatch and Kiyo to a duel. Arth reveals that Zatch is the vessel of a fabled draconic spirit called Bao (evoked as the spell Bao Zakerga) and deems him a bane to the Mamodo and human worlds. Arth represses Zatch by siphoning his stamina into the sword and prepares to remove him from the tournament, but Jido and Ted arrive and save him at the last moment.
102	2	"The Beginning of a Friendship, and the End of a Spell?" / "Disturbance of the Moonlight. The Fist of Friendship. Arth's Finishing Strike!"; Transliteration: "Tsukiyomaro no dōran Yūjo no kobushi Āsu ichigeki hissatsu!" (Japanese: 月夜の動乱 友情の拳 アース一撃必殺!)	April 10, 2005	November 22, 2008
Ted battles Arth in place of Zatch, whose energy has been absorbed into Arth's sword. Jido casts a series of spells that incrementally raises Ted's physical strength and agility but each require time before casting. Ellie responds with even higher-level spells to give Arth an advantage over Ted, who in turn raises his level of capacity again; the two parties try exceeding one another with ever-increasing powers, thus bringing the confrontation to a pinnacle. Before Ted could attain his highest level, however, Arth and Ellie stand down and leave, but caution the protagonists about an impending peril on Earth.
103	3	"Ted's Blues: The Girl in the Wind" / "Ted's Blues: Restarting the Fate of the Girl in the Wind"; Transliteration: "Tedo no Burūsu (Note: The kanji given is "哀歌", or "aika", which means "sad song". The furigana reads "ブルース", or "blues".) Kaze no naka no shōjo Unmei no saikai" (Japanese: テッドの哀歌 風の中の少女 運命の再開)	April 17, 2005	November 29, 2008
Ted and Jido's departure from Mochinoki is hampered when their motorcycle breaks down due to a faulty spark plug. Joined by Zatch, Ted heads downtown to buy a replacement. However, he spots a girl seemingly resembling Cherish, another Mamodo with whom he has a history, and tries to meet her. He inadvertently aggravates a group of uncouth juveniles, but with Zatch's encouragement he frightens them off. Ted eventually catches up to the girl but is disappointed that she is someone else than Cherish. Through it all, Ted procures a new spark plug for Jido to repair the motorcycle. The two head out of town, with Ted swearing to find Cherish someday.
104	4	"The Idol vs. the Schoolgirl!" / "Rival Idol. The Spark of Love. Suzume's Victory??"; Transliteration: "Raibaru ha aidoru Koi no hibana Suzume no shōri??" (Japanese: ライバルはアイドル 恋の火花 鈴芽の勝利??)	April 24, 2005	December 6, 2008
Ponygon's partner Kafk Sunbeam moves into Mochinoki, so Kiyo decides to buy him a gift at the department store as a welcoming token. Behind Kiyo's back, Zatch invites Suzy Mizuno and Tia via telephone. Kiyo is delighted to meet the two, as well as Tia's partner Megumi Oumi who tags along for her free time. Suzy becomes extremely envious that Kiyo and Megumi are close friends. While shopping, Suzy presses Kiyo about his relationship with Megumi using a lie detector, but it malfunctions when Megumi jokes about herself and Kiyo sharing "the same secret" (referring to the battle with Zofis in the previous season), which leads Suzy to misinterpret this as having a romantic affair. As the group helps Sunbeam settle into his new residence, Suzy tries repeatedly to woo Kiyo from Megumi, but each attempt causes a disaster. She relents and decides to cook a meal for the others. Kiyo, Megumi, and Sunbeam see a TV news report on the mystical tower, which has since disappeared from view, and suspect that it is related to the Mamodo world. They eat Suzy's food that turns out to be rancid, much to her dismay. Note: This is the last episode dubbed in English by Viz Media. The episode also features a cameo depiction of Makoto Raiku, the author and illustrator of the original manga.
105	5	"Coral-Q's Battle Transformation"; Transliteration: "Kyū shū! Kyū kyoku henkei? Waga na ha Kōraru Kyū (Note: This and other episodes involving Koral Q use the English letter "Q" as a pun with its Japanese pronunciation "kyū".)" (Japanese: Q襲! Q極変形? わが名はコーラルQ)	May 1, 2005	—
Kiyo begins his research into the mystery tower despite having little about its existence. Meanwhile, a technophile and self-ascribed nerd named Grubb abandons his class and sets to confront Kiyo and Zatch. Grubb sends his mechatronic Mamodo Koral Q to lure Zatch with a mechanized imitation of a yellowtail fish. Coming home from school, Kiyo notices this and tries fruitlessly to warn Zatch that it is a trick. Grubb and Koral Q ambush and trap the protagonists on a highway overpass. Through the first spell, Koral Q changes into a larger form to ready himself for battle, while also bragging that he and his partner already know about Zatch's repertoire of spells in spite of their first encounter with him.
106	6	"Coral-Q's Counterattack on Every Spell!?"; Transliteration: "Pinchi tōrai Gyakushuu no Kyū Zenjubon fūsatsu" (Japanese: ピンチ到来 逆襲のQ! 全呪文封殺!?)	May 8, 2005	—
As the battle begins, Koral Q states that he and Grubb have been accruing intel on Mamodo and their partners by spying on them, especially Tia and Ponygon whom they intend to target and eliminate after Zatch. With this extensive knowledge and a myriad of modular forms, Koral Q manages to outmaneuver Zatch spell by spell, although at one point he underplays a direct offensive, so Grubb boosts Koral Q's power output by means of a handheld computer. Having depleted nearly every alternative, Kiyo places his hopes for a win on two unused spells: Zagurzem and Bao Zakerga.
107	7	"The Evolution of Bao Zakeruga!"; Transliteration: "Dengeki rensa! Kyuukyoku shinka!? Aratanaru Baou!!" (Japanese: 電撃連鎖! 究極進化!? 新たなるバオウ!!)	May 15, 2005	—
With the scuffle reaching a climax, Koral Q and Grubb reveal that they have known about Zofis and his army of resurrected Mamodo, and criticize Kiyo and Zatch for warring against them. Thanks to this experience, however, Zatch manages to dodge Koral Q's forays but still cannot strike back. Re-strategizing, Koral Q uses his strongest attack in an effort to force Kiyo to conjure Bao Zakerga and tire him out; instead, the protagonists combine Zagurzem and Zakerga to stop it. Predicting that they will use Bao Zakerga, Koral Q switches into a mode with powerful levitating mirrors to defend himself. Realizing that Zagurzem can also refine Zatch's other spells and magnify their power, Kiyo casts it with Bao Zakerga on Koral Q, eliminating him. Before fading into the Mamodo world, Koral Q gives Kiyo a photograph of the tower, indicating that he and Grubb captured the image seen on TV. As Grubb grieves over his Mamodo's defeat, Kiyo encourages him to make friends, citing his own experiences. Grubb returns home and, following Kiyo's wisdom, accepts his classmates' invitation for school activities. At the end of the episode, Zeno grins menacingly as he recollects the tower's real purpose.
108	8	"Homesick!? Hana and Mother. Wanderlust Gash."; Transliteration: "Hōmushiku!? Hana to haha ue Samayoeru Gasshu" (Japanese: ホームシック!? 華と母上 さまよえるガッシュ)	May 22, 2005	—
Zatch reads a manga titled 3000 Leagues in Search of Mother. Inspired by it, he decides to search for examples of maternal figures in hopes of gaining remembrance of his own mother. When that proves unproductive, Zatch turns to Kiyo's mother, Hana Takamine, and is amazed at the amount of household work she puts in. Zatch inquires with Kiyo on what having a mother feels like, and he tells him to look to Hana as an example; Zatch is disheartened by the response and runs off. Following a brief search wherein Tia is also involved, Hana locates Zatch who tells her that he is too afraid to accept her as a parent because his feelings for his real mother might be forgotten. In response, Hana approves of Zatch having "two mothers", as she also thinks of him as her own child. Sensing that this was the answer to his moral strife, he lovingly embraces her. Note: This episode is a parodic dedication to the real-life anime.
109	9	"Duel in the Northern Country. Fated Rival. Umagon Frozen!!"; Transliteration: "Kitaguni no kettou Shukumei no raibaru Umagon hyouketsu!!" (Japanese: 北国の決闘 宿命のライバル ウマゴン氷結!!)	May 29, 2005	—
Sunbeam leaves Ponygon to Kiyo and Zatch's care as he heads to Hokkaido on a business arrangement for the week. However, Zatch helps Ponygon sneak aboard an airplane to catch up with him. Sunbeam is about to buy souvenirs for his return trip home when he finds Ponygon at a ranch. Although angered at Ponygon for following him, Sunbeam takes him for sightseeing around the region. At an eatery, Sunbeam learns of an unseasonal blizzard on the nearby mountains. The pair investigate, believing the weather to be the work of a Mamodo. They are soon met by a horse-like Mamodo named Kardio and his young bookowner Souza, who mocks Ponygon over his alliance with other Mamodo and foments a battle with the duo. The match appears even until Souza casts a spell that gives Kardio an upgrade to his armor, as well as the ability to manipulate ice.
110	10	"Cardio's Fierce Attack! Fighters Who Burn Up the Snow Field. Umagon's New Flame."; Transliteration: "Moushuu Karudio! Setsuken ni moyasu toushi Umagon shintana honoo" (Japanese: 猛襲カルディオ! 雪原に燃やす闘志 ウマゴン新たな炎)	June 5, 2005	—
Ponygon is outmatched by the blizzard-based powers from Kardio, who also immobilizes Sunbeam by freezing his legs in ice. As the opponents attempt to snatch the spellbook from Sunbeam, Ponygon grabs on Kardio to steer him off. This chain of events also leads to Ponygon gaining the new spell Diomur Shudoruk, which gives him a new layer of armor and the ability to manipulate fire, a polar opposite of Kardio's moveset. Ponygon's unconstrained use of the flames causes him to accidentally singe Sunbeam, who then forgives his Mamodo and tells him to fight with his heart rather than trying to control his attack. Recalling his promise to Zatch about coming home safely, he develops control of the flames and defrosts Sunbeam before the two flee. Though impressed at Ponygon's technique, Souza and Kardio decide to not pursue them.
111	11	"Dance! Burst Open! Swing! Huge Airport."; Transliteration: "Odotte! Hajikete! Yureru! Dai kūkō" (Japanese: 踊って! 弾けて! 揺れる! 大空港)	June 12, 2005	—
Dr. Riddles, along with Lady Susan (Note: Known as Big Boing (ビッグ・ボイン, Biggu Boin) in the Japanese release.) from earlier in the series, calls on Zatch, Kanchome, Tia, Ponygon, Wonrei and their human partners to share information about the mysterious tower, which he believes belongs to the Mamodo Rioh. While the group waits at the airport for Kanchome, Wonrei and their bookowners Parco Folgore and Li-en, chaos ensues: Zatch and Lady Susan split from the group to guide a lost child to a daycare center; a paparazzi chases the group upon recognizing Megumi, who borrows a disguise from Riddles to outwit the mob; and a band of gunrunners holds the daycare captive after getting caught by a customs agent, but Lady Susan quells them and rescues the children. Later on, once Riddles presents his findings, Kanchome has an anxiety attack when he recognizes the tower from the images, but keeps silent about it out of concern for his friends.
112	12	"Spin! Spin! Fall! Fall! Explosive Ice Skating!!"; Transliteration: "Mawaru! Mawaru! Korobu! Korobu! Bakuretsu aisusukēto!!" (Japanese: 回る! 回る! 転ぶ! 転ぶ! 爆裂アイススケート!!)	June 19, 2005	—
After Kiyo and Zatch see their friends off at the airport, Suzy invites them for ice skating. Kiyo's classmates; Kane, Yamanaka, and Iwajima; overhear this and come along to challenge Kiyo to a friendly competition. Ponygon and Sunbeam, as well as Kiyo's school principal and his wife Sabae Nakata, join them. At the ice arena, all of the attendees are morbidly unskilled at the sport, resulting in humorous blunders made worse when the principal challenges everyone to a game of capture the flag. Kiyo ends the day mortified about all the happenings.
113	13	"A Letter From a Friend. Burn the Book!! Rein's True Identity."; Transliteration: "Tomokara no tegami Hon wo moyase!! Rein no shōtai" (Japanese: 友からの手紙 本を燃やせ!! レインの正体)	June 26, 2005	—
Zatch receives a letter from his long-forgotten friend Rein, an oversized polar bear-like Mamodo who requests that he personally oust him from the tournament. He and Kiyo trace the letter's return address to a mansion somewhere in Southeastern Asia. They arrive at the estate with a pompous and neglectful woman Jill and an impish boy Kyle, whom she constantly marginalizes, as its residents, though Rein is nowhere to be found. The boys soon learn that Rein has the ability to also assume the form of an adult male human. At a nearby town, a crowd heckles the duo after mistakenly associating Zatch with someone who drew mustaches on their face; Kiyo and Zatch manage to elude the angry crowd and return to the mansion. Recalling Rein's words about Zatch, Kyle attempts to climb a turret to spot him but gets stuck due to an unbalanced ladder. The protagonists attempt to extricate him, but the ladder gives out and sends the three plummeting, until Rein arrives on time to save them. Rein explains that the Mamodo tournament is too much for Kyle, his bookowner, and asks Zatch to burn his book.
114	14	"Weakling Kyle. Papipurio's Mustache. Rodeux's Trap."; Transliteration: "Yowamushi Kairu hige no Papipurio Rodyū no wana" (Japanese: 弱虫カイル ヒゲのパピプリオ ロデュウの罠)	July 3, 2005	—
Zatch has reservations about honoring Rein's request. He and Kiyo instead counsel Kyle to be more courageous in the face of Jill, who had in fact taken over his family estate and inheritance by illegitimate means. However, Kyle remains too deeply fainthearted and dependent on Rein, who justifies this as the main reason for returning to the Mamodo world. Kyle is then kidnapped by Purio and Lupa, who intend to take him as insurance, also separating the book from Rein. When Zatch and Kiyo chase them to the beach, Purio shows off his newly-grown mustache, indicating that he made the fake mustaches on the townsfolk as a prank, as well as a new spell that produces a highly corrosive slime. The move is merely a farce, however, as Zatch and Kiyo make short work of the pair. Meanwhile, Rein is approached by the vampiric Mamodo Rodeux with his partner, a one-eyed Brazilian girl Chita. Rodeux tries bargaining Rein's allegiance in hopes of making his powers an asset for Rioh, but Rein refuses. Infuriated, Rodeux prepares an assault on him, but Kiyo and Zatch intervene with Kyle watching from the sidelines.
115	15	"Rodeux's Fierce Attack. Dying Rein. Awaken, Kyle."; Transliteration: "Mōkō Rodyū hinshi no Rein Mezame yo Kairu" (Japanese: 猛攻ロデュウ 瀕死のレイン 目覚めよカイル)	July 10, 2005	—
Purio and Lupa collarborate with Rodeux and Chita, and the four quickly get the better of Zatch and Kiyo in the festering back-and-forth. Observing Zatch's valor, Rein is reminded of the first time he befriended him; back in the Mamodo world, Rein was widely dreaded for his volatile and incorrigible nature, but Zatch was unafraid as he aided and nourished him after a drop down a cliff. Following Zatch's example of courage before Kyle, Rein takes on his real form and tackles Rodeux. Zatch also levies a round of Zagurzem on Rodeux before he and Kiyo are snagged in a net generated by another of Purio's freshly-unlocked spells, inhibiting them. This distracts Rein, allowing Rodeux to break out of his clutch and inflict injuries on him. Seeing his Mamodo in agony, Kyle gains a newfound steadfastness and brandishes Rein's spellbook, which glows brightly as it feeds off his emotion.
116	16	"Ultimate Spell Explosion! Garubadosu Aborodio. Rein's Dream."; Transliteration: "Saidai jumon sakuretsu! Garubadosu Aborodio Rein no Yume" (Japanese: 最大呪文炸裂! ガルバドス·アボロディオ レインの夢)	July 17, 2005	—
For his first salvo, Kyle casts a spell in which Rein produces giant claws that undercut Rodeux, who then lunges back at Kyle whom Zatch protects by landing a hit with Zakerga. Kyle next conjures Rein's strongest spell that sends Rodeux unconscious. Purio, Lupa, and Chita break off the battle, the latter hauling her faltered Mamodo to safety. Kyle, who had collapsed from intense exhaustion, awakens the next day to discover that Rein has already returned to the Mamodo world. When Jill barges in and berates him and Rein by name, Kyle rises up for himself and threatens to tell everyone about her misconducts, to her complete shock. Kiyo and Zatch see this from a distance and head home, confident on how much Kyle has matured.
117	17	"Kung Fu of Passion. Wonrei's Tragedy. Last Chapter of a Love Song."; Transliteration: "Ren'ai kanfū Higeki Wonrei renkashuushou" (Japanese: 恋愛カンフー 悲劇ウォンレイ 恋歌終章)	July 24, 2005	—
Li-en observes Wonrei engaging in side-activities and follows him. When he interacts with another woman, Li-en presumes that he is cheating on her. The woman is actually the organizer of a street fight club that earns cash prize to the winner, and has enlisted Wonrei to participate. Li-en sneaks into the club to confront Wonrei and learns of the woman's true motive: she plans to capture Li-en to force her father, Li-akron, into surrendering control of his triad to her, then kill them both. Li-en forgives Wonrei, and the two derail her plan and escape. Back home, Wonrei explains that he needed the money to afford an expensive new pair of shoes as a gift for Li-en. She later receives the same shoes from Kiyo and Zatch. In the final scene, Rioh sets his plan to "break the seal" of the tower in motion.
118	18	"Kidnapped Gash! Trap Over the Sea. Sinking Dartagnan."; Transliteration: "Tsuresarareta Gasshu! Umi no ue no wana Darutanian gekichin" (Japanese: 連れ去られたガッシュ! 海の上の罠 ダルタニアン撃沈)	August 7, 2005	—
The episode's prologue shows a macabre Mamodo Zaruchim marshalling another named Keith into Rioh's cause. Prof. Dartagnian visits Kiyo to tell about the destruction of the stone slate tablets, candidly unaware of his involvement with them. When Kiyo shrugs it off, Dartagnian promptly leaves while claiming to have taken something of value to Kiyo, which is actually Zatch whom he rescued from Naomi earlier in the day. Shortly thereafter, Megumi and Sunbeam report that Tia and Ponygon have gone missing, and Kiyo joins in their search. At the playground, the three receive a message from Dartagnian daring them to find their Mamodo on his private cruise ship, and presume that he kidnapped them. There, Dartagnian subjects the trio to humiliating scenarios to test their attachment with the Mamodo, threatening to detonate bombs aboard if they did not cooperate. He eventually gives in to their agitated demand to give back Zatch, Tia, and Ponygon. However, the three Mamodo reveal that Dartagnian was fostering them because their partners were too busy for them. Kiyo, Megumi, and Sunbeam apologize and promise to devote more time with them, thus helping set Dartagnian's point across. Dartagnian then accidentally triggers the bombs and sinks the ship, but everyone escapes on lifeboats.
119	19	"Tio's Spirit. The One And Only Partner. When Wounds Heal."; Transliteration: "Tio no genki Tada hitori no pātonā Kizu ga ieru toki" (Japanese: ティオの元気 ただ一人のパートナー 傷が癒える時)	August 14, 2005	—
Megumi leaves Tia in Kiyo's care while she goes on a world tour. After a fun-filled day, Tia and Zatch turn in for the evening. In bed, Zatch asks why Tia is so spirited, and she gives an emotional story about her coming to Earth from the Mamodo world. After escaping Maruss' assault, she fell into the bay and soon washed ashore, interrupting Megumi's photo shoot. Megumi took her to the local hospital and periodically checked on her. The experiences had made Tia downtrodden and detached, having closed herself off everyone else to avoid a recurrent feeling of betrayal. However, once Maruss located and confronted Tia, Megumi stood up for her, thus helping her begin to mend her internal scars. This is expedited when Tia's spellbook shone brightly to portend that Megumi is her bookowner. The two managed to evade Maruss, and continued to do so until their first encounter with Kiyo and Zatch, both whom Tia also credits for becoming more outwardly to others. She finishes her story only to see that Zatch had fallen asleep.
120	20	"It was Seen? Oyoyo~ Prospering Momon. Tio's Gigantic Explosion!"; Transliteration: "Mirarete Oyoyoyo~ Tokimeku Momon Tio dai bakuhatsu!" (Japanese: 見られてオヨヨヨ〜 ときめくモモン ティオ大爆発!)	August 21, 2005	—
Zatch, Tia, and Ponygon are playing at the park when a timid nun named Elle Chivas asks them about her "child," euphemistically referring to her lascivious Mamodo Momon. Kiyo happens upon Momon on a tree but mistakes him for a stranded pet and tries to help him down. Momon surprises Kiyo, pulls down his pants and hurls him into a canal right in front of Suzy. Embarrassed, Kiyo brings Zatch to exact revenge on Momon, also meeting Elle for the first time. Throughout the pursuit, Momon repeatedly looks under Tia's skirt. Visibly revolted, she lashes out at Momon, who easily dodges her due to his uncanny ability to predict other Mamodo's actions. Because of this, Kiyo and Elle struggle to contain Momon who leads the group back to the park having succeeded in swiping Tia's briefs. Megumi returns from her tour in the Hawaiian Islands to find Tia fuming for a battle.
121	21	"Awaken, Jealousy. The Angered Goddess. Chajiru Saifodon."; Transliteration: "Mezameyo Jerashī Ikareru megami Chājiru Saifodon" (Japanese: 目覚めよジェラシー 怒れる女神 チャージル·サイフォドン)	August 28, 2005	—
As Megumi and Tia start the battle, Elle is revealed to have heretofore never been involved in a Mamodo confrontation, nor has she any knowledge about Momon's spells and their effects. Tia unleashes a rapid barrage of Saisu at Momon, none of the attacks able to hit her mark. Momon uses a spell that makes Tia completely stagnant, to which he flips her skirt and gawks at her undergarment, further riling her. Eventually, her uncharacteristic rage helps unlock the spell Chajir Saifodon, which summons a frightful saber-flaunting spirit that transfuses her negative emotion and charges toward Momon, who just then gains a spell that Elle impulsively recites. This causes Momon's ears to sprout like a propeller and fly him off site, barely avoiding the attack, a move that Kiyo derides as a "running away spell". Afterwards, Kiyo rejects Megumi's plea to eliminate Momon, believing that he is paramount to uncovering more about the mystery tower—the mentioning of it causes Momon to quaver, indicating that he is indeed aware of it. Additionally, Megumi notices another spell dimly glowing on Tia's book, but it remains indecipherable. At Kiyo's house, Megumi gives her friends souvenirs from her excursion, including a swimsuit for Tia that Momon snatches, prompting her to chase him again.
122	22	"Legend of Kaguya. Gash's Summer Festival. Girl Who Returned to the Moon."; Transliteration: "Kaguya densetsu Gasshu no natsumatsuri Tsuki hekaetta shoujou" (Japanese: かぐや伝説 ガッシュの夏祭り 月へ帰った少女)	September 4, 2005	—
Hana takes Zatch and Ponygon to an evening summertime festival. There, Zatch wanders off and meets a girl named Natsuko, who claims to have been separated from her chaperones, and eagerly agrees to accompany her for the festivities. However, she soon reveals herself to be the mythological Princess Kaguya, who eloped her agents in an attempt to escape from a stringent lifestyle on the Moon. Soon, one agent spots Kaguya, resulting in a brief pursuit onto the rooftops. Kaguya relents and elects to return home with her escorts. As a helicopter picks them up, Kaguya tells Zatch that everything was a lie, and that she truly had fun with him before vanishing into the moonlit sky.
123	23	"Roar of Pride. Bari vs. Ted. Which Will Disappear?"; Transliteration: "Unare poraido Barī tai Teddo Kieru no ha docchi?" (Japanese: 唸れプライド バリーVSテッド 消えるのはどっち?)	September 11, 2005	—
Jido and Ted are resting at a hostel. Ted bumps into Vincent Bari, resulting in a physical squabble between the two Mamodo before Jido and Gustav restrain them, whilst also agreeing to a combat on a nearby hilltop in two hours. From the onset, the battle slants against Ted; after getting knocked down, he lays eyes on a flower, reminding him of his longtime goal of finding Cherish, and regains a measure of will. Ted's caliber of attacks is raised to the maximal Top Gear, and Bari uses his strongest spell to block them. The duel ends in an apparent stalemate as Ted, Bari and their bookowners are seen parting ways. Meanwhile, Kiyo confers with Megumi and Tia at his house regarding the mystical tower and a drove of Mamodo with their human partners inexplicably massing there, while proclaiming that he will make use of Momon's capabilities to locate the tower and explore it in person.
124	24	"Premonition of Separation. Suzume's Confession. Hiking of Love and Youth."; Transliteration: "Wakare no yokan Suzume no kokuhaku Ai to seishun no haikingu" (Japanese: 別れの予感 鈴芽の告白 愛と青春のハイキング)	September 18, 2005	—
On the eve of his quest, Kiyo joins his classmates for a hiking trip, with Zatch and Ponygon following him. The night before, Suzy had stayed up late to knit a doll tethered to a red string as a good-luck charm for Kiyo. However, the item falls into the wrong hands after Suzy's friend Marylou presumes it to be her birthday present, and the other students confuse it for a love gift. Suzy manages to retrieve the present, and gives it to Kiyo when he reveals that he will be gone awhile. Though unaware of his motives, Suzy senses his mood as morose as when he and Zatch left last time, and tells him to return home safe and sound. In the final scene, Rioh is approached by Wonrei.
125	25	"Heartless Riou. The Cursed Demons. Now, to Faudo."; Transliteration: "Hijou naru Riou Noroi wareshi mamono Iza Faūdo he" (Japanese: 非情なるリオウ 呪われし魔物 いざファウードへ)	September 25, 2005	—
Kiyo notifies his friends that he and Zatch are preparing to embark for the tower, and Riddles informs him that Li-en and Wonrei have not been heard from. Kiyo also receives a photo of Rodeux and Chita, both who are linked to the pair's disappearance. At that moment, a specter appears in Kiyo's bedroom revealing that Rioh brought the tower, called "Faudo", to give himself a tactical advantage in the tournament, and that Rioh is using Li-en and several bookowners for leverage with a curse that will kill them in four days' time unless Faudo's seal is broken. As his friends make arrangements to join him, Kiyo sends Jido and Ted an email containing instructions. Kiyo and Zatch leave Mochinoki, vowing to rescue Li-en and Wonrei who they are now convinced are under Rioh's influence.
126	26	"Journey From Which You Cannot Return. Wavering Determination. Faudo's True Form!"; Transliteration: "Modorenai tabi Yureru ketsui Faūdo no shoutai!" (Japanese: 戻れない旅 ゆれる決意 ファウードの正体!)	October 2, 2005	—
Riddles and Apollo Genesis reserve an airlift for Zatch and his friends. At the airport, as the group waits for a reticent Momon to reveal Faudo's whereabouts on an atlas, Folgore and Kanchome's airplane becomes stranded in the air when a negligent worker causes the landing gear to malfunction. Folgore uses Poruk to turn Kanchome into a wheel set, helping the plane lands safely and saving the passengers. With the team fully assembled, Kiyo coaxes Momon into finally pointing to an islet off New Zealand as the destination. In flight, when asked by Kiyo about Faudo in the imagery, Kanchome describes it as a gargantuan humanoid creature with its arms folded in.
127	27	"Arrival at Faudo! Desperate Assault. Assassins That Awaited."; Transliteration: "Faūdo touchaku! Kesshi no totsuryu Matteita shikaku" (Japanese: ファウード到着! 決死の突入 待っていた刺客)	October 9, 2005	—
Upon hearing Kanchome's description, the group is alarmed that Faudo, currently inanimate, is in a gigantic vault that forms the tower and realizes that it has the potential to harm humanity. Zatch and allies reach Faudo, which is magically cloaked, and parachute onto a citadel encircling the vault. However, Rioh is alerted to the incursion and dispatches Keith and another Mamodo named Buzarai to ambush the allies in mid-descent, causing Zatch, Kanchome and their partners to get separated from the others and downing their aircraft. On solid ground, Zatch's group are encountered by Keith, Buzarai and their respective partners Berun and Kazu, with Keith revealing himself as Bari's archrival.
128	28	"Keith, Buzarai. Symphony of Death. Goodbye, Kanchome."; Transliteration: "Kīsu Buzarai Shi no kōkyoukyoku Saraba Kyanchome" (Japanese: キース·ブザライ 死の交響曲 さらばキャンチョメ)	October 16, 2005	—
Keith and Buzarai outflank Zatch and Kiyo in the ensuing battle. Despite this, Zatch manages to land a blow on Keith with Zagurzem but erroneously hits Folgore as well, prompting him and Kanchome to hide behind a bush. However, when Keith bets that he can defeat Zatch before smoking out his last cigar, Kanchome returns to battle determined to prevent this, which unlocks another spell in his book. His efforts to divert the opponents' attacks go poorly, and he is injured as a result. In a last-ditch attempt to save Kanchome, Folgore reads the new spell Dima Buruk as Keith doles out the final attack. On the opposite side of the citadel, Sunbeam rescues Elle who nearly fell into an abyss. Elle gratefully shares him a kiss, and the two fall in love, much to Megumi and Tia's consternation. The group quickly realizes that Momon had run away.
129	29	"Miraculous New Spell. Dima Buruku. I am not a Weakling!"; Transliteration: "Kiseki no shin jumon Dima Buruku Boku ha yowamushi janai" (Japanese: 奇跡の新呪文 ディマ·ブルク ぼくは弱虫じゃない!)	October 23, 2005	—
Keith's shot misses as Kanchome has spawned numerous physical copies of himself due to the effect of Dima Buruk. At first, they ignore Kanchome's commands and run away from battle, but they come back in time to protect Folgore and the alpha from Keith's next attack. Realizing that the clones only respond to his subconscious, Kanchome mobilizes them to descend on Keith and sees that they are stronger than even he is. With Keith's attention diverted, Zatch engages Buzarai but is forcefully pinned down by a large bladed top produced by his spells. Several of Kanchome's clones save Zatch by dismantling the top. Meanwhile, Tia, Ponygon and their partners are confronted by Cherish and her partner Nicole, who bears an insignia of Rioh's curse.
130	30	"Buzarai's Fierce Attack. Dioga VS Baou. Reversal chain." Transliteration: "Buzarai mouko Dioga tai Baou Kyakutene no rensa" (Japanese: ブザライ猛攻 ディオガ対バオウ 逆転への連鎖)	October 30, 2005	—
For his final move, Buzarai unleashes his strongest spell at Zatch and company, but one of Kanchome's clones tosses Keith into the path of the attack, giving Zatch and Kiyo an opening. Using Keith's electrified body as a conductor, Zatch overcomes Buzarai's spell with his improvised Bao Zakerga and eliminates him. Keith is unfazed by the hit, but his cigar has smoldered out. He retreats with Berun, distraught at his own failure. Afterward, Zatch and the others are found by Momon. Meanwhile, Ponygon readies his finishing move on Cherish, but Wonrei intercedes and whisks her and Nicole away.
131	31	"Determination of the King. Friends? The World? Gash's Decision."; Transliteration: "Ō no kakugo Tomo ka? Sekai ka? Gasshu no ketsudan" (Japanese: 王の覚悟 友か? 世界か? ガッシュの決断)	November 6, 2005	—
Guided by Momon, Zatch, Kanchome and their partners rendezvous with the others and have their wounds healed by Tia. Learning about the run-in with Wonrei, Kiyo deduces that he has defected to Rioh. The group is joined by Riya and his partner Aleshie. The two inform them that Rioh will be unable to break Faudo's seal with Buzarai gone. Kiyo proposes that releasing Faudo is the only way to save Li-en from the curse, and that Zatch would serve as a stand-in for Buzarai. Aleshie tests Zatch's probity by asking whether he values Li-en's life or those of everyone on Earth; Zatch replies that he and the others will find a way to save both, pleasing him. Aleshie and Riya reveal a means of returning Faudo to the Mamodo world.
132	32	"Test Within the Stomach. Break Through Difficult Questions. Tintin Chance."; Transliteration: "I no naka no shiren nanmon toppa Tin Tin chansu" (Japanese: 胃の中の試練 難問突破 ティンティンチャンス)	November 13, 2005	—
Zatch and company enter Faudo's quasi-organic innards, with Aleshie telling Kiyo to lead the group as he never explored beyond its mouth. In the stomach, they encounter a childish guardian named Unko Tintin, who challenges everyone to a riddle game that they must solve in order to pass, or they would be sent into a pit of acid below. After solving his, Kiyo helps each member of the team answer the riddles until only Ponygon is left. Unko asks him to prove Fermat's Last Theorem, which outrages Kiyo as Ponygon cannot speak. Entreated by Kiyo, Unko relents and issues Ponygon an easier riddle, which he answers correctly by swinging his tail. The group clears the stomach without incident. In the small intestine, they set off a booby trap that activates an enormous mechanized drill that bears down on them.
133	33	"Cool-Headed Zaruchim. The Truth of the Curse. Stand Up! Aleshie."; Transliteration: "Reitetsu Zaruchimu Noroi no shinjitsu Tate! Arishie" (Japanese: 冷徹ザルチム 呪いの真実 立て! アリシエ)	November 20, 2005	—
The allies run from the careening drill while also dodging tentacles that dissolve anything on contact. Kiyo discovers holes on the intestinal walls that only open right when the drill passes over them. As the passageway begins to slope upward, Aleshie attempts to hinder the drill with Riya's spells but hesitates and cringes in pain. Elle casts Momon's spell that stops the drill, allowing the group to safely escape into the liver, where Wonrei and Zaruchim ahve been waiting. Zaruchim reveals that Aleshie has deceived Zatch and his team: he is in fact afflicted with Rioh's curse. When Aleshie momentarily blacks out from the curse's effects, Zaruchim immobilizes Zatch and allies with a spell that turns their own shadows against them. Aleshie frees them from the spell, but Kanchome, Tia and their partners are taken prisoner. Aleshie and Riya challenge Zaruchim to a fight.
134	34	"Fighting For Whom? Wonrei and Aleshie. Decision of Suffering."; Transliteration: "Daga tameni tatakau Wonrei to Arishie Kunou no ketsudan" (Japanese: 誰がために戦う ウォンレイとアリシエ 苦悩の決断)	November 27, 2005	—
Zaruchim rejects Aleshie and summons Wonrei to fight in his stead. As the battle rages, Zatch and allies rebuke Wonrei for choosing Rioh over them, although Riya notices that Wonrei is fighting to save Li-en's life, just as Aleshie is seeking to protect the people of his home village. At Aleshie's urging, Zatch and the splintered group flee into a labyrinth of blood vessels as Riya distracts Wonrei and Zaruchim with a combination of spells, in a battle that ends when Aleshie passes out from the curse again. Meanwhile, a dying Li-en has flashbacks in which Rodeux and Chita to kidnap her as the curse takes hold.
135	35	"Faudo: Deadly Zone. The Demon That Beats the Heart. Momon's Tears."; Transliteration: "Faūdo kesshiken Shinzou utsu mamono Momon no namida" (Japanese: ファウード決死圏 心臓打つ魔物 モモンの涙)	December 4, 2005	—
On Zaruchim's orders, Wonrei locks Kanchome, Tia and their partners in a brig, while Zatch's group ventures through Faudo's circulatory system. Momon is still fraught with recalcitrance and repeatedly misleads them through the maze. Fed up by this, Elle slaps his face and reprimands him. Impelled, Momon leads the group to Faudo's heart occupied by Heart Guardian, a minion tasked to keep the heart beating, who passively sends them to the spinal cord. There, they find a schematic of Faudo's biology, from which Kiyo learns of a fail-safe device that would transfer Faudo to the Mamodo world. Momon memorizes the schematic while the group naps, following his advice. Assisted by Zatch and Ponygon, he piggybacks them to the location of the fail-safe, a deed he hopes would make Elle proud. Arriving at the location, Momon detects two Mamodo beyond a doorway.
136	36	"Faudo's Revival Draws Near. Return Device Activated. Rivals Stand in the Way."; Transliteration: "Semoru Faūdo fukkatsu Kikansouchi shidou Tachifusagaru Raibaru" (Japanese: 迫るファウード復活 帰還装置始動 立ちふさがるライバル)	December 11, 2005	—
Arth, Kardio and Souza ambush Zatch and launch a preemptive strike at the bookowners, aiming for their spellbooks, but they are alerted by the commotion and evade the attack. A battle ensues in which Kardio manages to overpower Ponygon. Arth intends to use the fail-safe first, having been compelled by Ellie to let Rioh's curse kill her justifiably to stop Rioh from releasing Faudo, but Kiyo convinces him not to sacrifice her. Arth points out that the inscriptions on the fail-safe console are the same as on the spellbooks and agrees to decode them for Kiyo. At the brig, Aleshie and Riya inform Folgore, Kanchome, Megumi, and Tia that Faudo will be released in five hours and assures them that Kiyo has a plan to thwart Rioh and neutralize Faudo.
137	37	"The Curse's Time Limit. Crush the Seal! Reach, Gash's Feelings."; Transliteration: "Noroi no taimurimitto fuuin wo kudake! Todoke Gasshu no omoi" (Japanese: 呪いのタイムリミット 封印を砕け! 届けガッシュの想い)	December 18, 2005	—
Within an hour, Arth helps Kiyo interpret the Mamodo language, enabling him to program the fail-safe to activate after Faudo is released as it must charge up. When asked by Sunbeam, Souza says that he sided with Ellie because she reminded him of his sister. At dawn on the fourth day, Zatch helps Rioh and his minions open the seal in the nick of time, breaking the curse and saving Li-en and the affected bookowners. Kanchome, Tia and their partners escape from prison and reunite with Zatch, while Wonrei reasserts his alliance with Zatch and his friends, as do Riya, Kardio, and Arth. No longer bound by the seal, the vault begins to crumble apart and set Faudo free.
138	38	"Demonic soldier Faudo. Light in the middle of despair. Kiyomaro's secret plan." Transliteration: "Madou kyouhei Faūdo Ketsubou no naka no hikari Kiyomaro no hisaku" (Japanese: 魔導巨兵ファウード 絶望の中の光 清麿の秘策)	December 25, 2005	—
Faudo emerges from the vault as a monstrous being. Rioh merges with a magical gemstone to symbiotically connect with Faudo and orders it to kill Zatch and his allies for rebuffing his demands for their loyalty, only to discover that Kiyo sabotaged Faudo to prevent it from attacking them with its laser cannons. Zatch and allies escape Faudo, as Kiyo had rigged a teleportation device to send Faudo into the Kermadec Trench in an attempt to drown it. However, Faudo unexpectedly demonstrates an ability to swim. Rioh disarms Faudo's fail-safe, trapping it on Earth, and sets it to destroy Japan to get back at Kiyo, marooning Zatch and allies on the ocean.
139	39	"Aim for the brain! Roaring Faudo. Desperate re-entry." Transliteration: "Nou wo mezase Bakusou Faūdo Hisshin no saitotsunyuu" (Japanese: 脳を目指せ! 爆走ファウード 必死の再突入)	January 8, 2006	—
Zatch and company regroup and form a new plan to deter Faudo by seizing the gem from Rioh, who is in Faudo's brain. Using Ponygon and Kardio's spells, the group catches up to Faudo and reinfiltrates it, arriving in the brain structure. To navigate the network of tunnels, the party splits into two groups, each member with their respective Mamodo. Kiyo; accompanied by Aleshie, Li-en, and Megumi; runs into Rodeaux and Chita, whom Wonrei and Li-en preoccupy so that the rest can continue ahead. The second group; consisting of Elle, Ellie, Folgore, Souza, and Sunbeam; encounters the two Mamodo Fango and Jedun with their partners Adler and Eskaruro Run. Unbeknownst to everyone, Zeno and his partner have been watching them from afar.
140	40	"Those who won't become King. Do or die! Wonrei. Final fist." Transliteration: "Ō niwanarenumono Kesshi Wonrei Saigo no tekken" (Japanese: 王にはなれぬ者 決死! ウォンレイ 最後の鉄拳)	January 15, 2006	—
A Rodeux is about to be defeated by Wonrei, he uses a liquid formula engineered from Faudo's hormones to create duplicates of himself. Wonrei is hurt trying to protect Li-en from a flurry of attacks, but she urges him to focus on the battle rather than her well-being. Her words raise Wonrei's spirit, and he manages to single out Rodeux's real analogue. In another frantic act, Rodeux infuses Chita with the formula to amplify his powers and sends out his strongest attack, but Wonrei counters it with Rao Diboren. The exchange of spells touches off a freak explosion that ignites Wonrei's book, eliminating him. Wonrei leaves for the Mamodo world and hands his hachimaki to a devastated Li-en as memento.
141	41	"Burning Umagon. Freezing Cardio. Run to Victory!!"; Transliteration: "Moero Umagon Kyouketsu Karudio Shouri e hashire" (Japanese: 燃えろウマゴン 氷結カルディオ 勝利へ走れ!!)	January 22, 2006	—
Ponygon and Kardio engage Fango and Jedun, but a dissension arises between Sunbeam and Souza as they simultaneously launch their Mamodo's spells that negate one another. Rioh entraps the combatants with a force field. Worried about the outcome, both Elle and Ellie implore their friends about the fate of Earth, which helps Sunbeam and Souza set aside their differences. The two acquiesce on a strategy with Ponygon and Kardio, and together they manage to eliminate their foes and incapacite their partners before breaking out of the force field. Meanwhile, Apollo and Riddles, who somehow survived the airplane crash, drop off Ted and Jido at the fast-moving Faudo. Inside the mouth, they are swiftly overtaken by a Mamodo and human companion.
142	42	"Sealed room. Aleshie's fight. Destiny once more!" Transliteration: "Tozasareta heya Arishie no tatakai Innen futatabi!" (Japanese: 閉ざされた部屋 アリシエの戦 因縁再び!)	January 29, 2006	—
Kiyo's group encounters Gyaron and Harry. Aleshie and Riya engage them, giving Zatch, Tia and their partners a chance to recuperate. With a shapeshifting ability, Zaruchim disguises himself as Li-en and interrupts the battle by pretending to be Rodeaux and Chita's hostage. Aleshie and Riya eliminate Gyaron, and Kiyo manages to expose Zaruchim. Infuriated, Zaruchim eliminates Rodeux by slashing his book. Zaruchim provokes Aleshie and Riya into battling him when he binds Kiyo, Megumi and their Mamodo in the shadow spell, intending to kill them.
143	43	"Burn Up Life. Warrior Aleshie. The Conclusion!? Zaruchim"; Transliteration: "Inochi wo moyase Ikusabito Arishie Ketchaku!? Zaruchimu" (Japanese: 命を燃やせ 戦人アリシエ 決着!? ザルチム)	February 5, 2006	—
As the battle commences, a flashback shows that Zaruchim invaded Aleshie's village and threatened a villager's life to coerce him into joining Rioh, resulting in each other's bitter feud. In the present, Zaruchim fools Aleshie and Riya with a duplicate of himself as a decoy, rendering them defenseless, and targets Aleshie with his strongest attack to kill him. However, Ted and Jido intervene, rescuing everyone, and critically wound Zaruchim, forcing him to retreat with Raushin Mo's aid. Li-en catches up to the group, and Jido warns them about the Mamodo they saw on the way in; the Mamodo is revealed to be Zeno, who followed everyone inside.
144	44	"We are Kings. Kanchomé and Momon. Defeat Keith!"; Transliteration: "Bokura ha ousama Kyanchome to Momon Taose Kīsu!" (Japanese: ぼくらは王様 キャンチョメとモモン 倒せキース!)	February 12, 2006	—
Folgore's unit encounters Keith and Berun in Faudo's auditory cortex, portrayed as a concert hall. Folgore and Kanchome battle them while Sunbeam and Souza regain their strength, and Arth and Ellie use this distraction to move on ahead. When inquired by Folgore, Keith states that he often sings Ode to Joy because he heard it while working at a potato tempura shop. His unintelligible humming irks Elle, who sings him the proper lyrics of the composition. Insulted, Keith snaps and lashes out at Kanchome and Momon before Bari and Gustav arrive and engage him, allowing the group to make their escape.
145	45	"Screams that won't reach. Ted vs. Cherish. Things more important than King."; Transliteration: "Todokanai sakebi Teddo tai Cherisshu Ou yori taisetsuna mono" (Japanese: 届かない叫び テッドvsチェリッシュ 王より大切なもの)	February 19, 2006	—
Cherish and Nicole block Kiyo's group, and Ted opts to battle them, revealing that Cherish is the girl he was searching for. Cherish aggressively attacks Ted, who is reluctant to fight back, as she believes that he murdered her parents back in the Mamodo world. Ted tells Cherish that he found her parents already dead at her home and witnessed another Mamodo fleeing the scene. As Ted tries to help mend their relationship, Rioh dispatches Faudo's Heart Guardian to attack the two, ousting Cherish. She reconciles with Ted before returning to the Mamodo world. A new spell appears on Ted's book, and he uses it to defeat Heart Guardian before losing consciousness from exhaustion.
146	46	"Faudo's safeguards. From Arth to Gash. Trusted future." Transliteration: "Faūdo no shugosha Āsu kara Gasshu he Takusareru mirai" (Japanese: ファウードの守護者 アースからガッシュへ 託される未来)	February 26, 2006	—
During the fight that soon leads to a stalemate, Keith reveals that he bested Bari in a tempura eating contest, thence beginning their rivalry. In the midbrain, Arth and Ellie encounter Rioh barricading the doorway to the main control room that serves as Faudo's nerve center. Rioh uses a switch to close off all entry points, preventing Zatch and his reunited allies from intervening. In the ensuing conflict, Rioh ingests Faudo's hormonal formula to replenish himself each time Arth is about to defeat him. Realizing that Rioh is intentionally wearing Ellie down, Arth sacrifices himself to reach the switch, allowing Zatch and his allies to confront Rioh and avenge him.
147	47	"Reversed future. Thunder emperor Zeon. Prelude to ruin." Transliteration: "Hanten suru mirai Raitei Zeon Hametsu-he no jokyoku" (Japanese: 反転する未来 雷帝ゼオン 破滅への序曲)	March 5, 2006	—
Cornered by Zatch and allies, Rioh summons his bookowner, Banikis Ghigau, who is revealed to have been hiding inside a pouch on Rioh's torso. As Banikis' spellcasting improves after appearing in the open, Rioh manages to overpower Zatch and his allies. Zeno and his bookowner arrive and challenge Rioh, the former boasting that they ousted Zaruchim. Rioh uses a forbidden spell to gain strength, but Zeno easily eliminates him. Zeno then steals the gem and takes command of Faudo, which reaches shallower waters of the Pacific Ocean as it speeds toward Japan.
148	48	"Raging Zeon! Two fates. Gash's secret." Transliteration: "Dotou Zeon! Futatsu no shukumei Gasshu no himitsu" (Japanese: 怒涛ゼオン 二つの宿命 ガッシュの秘密)	March 12, 2006	—
As the allies contemplate their next move, Zeno teleports Zatch and Kiyo into the control room and reveals himself as Zatch's twin brother, affirming that he wiped Zatch's memories and surreptitiously lured them with the apparition at Kiyo's house. Zeno plans to give control of Faudo to his partner Dufort, who resolves to kill off humankind that he believes has wronged him after he spent most of his life incarcerated and subjected to human experimentation over his psychic powers. Explaining that their father, King Dauwan Bell, gave Zatch the spirit of Bao, Zeno attempts to eliminate Zatch out of envy and take the power for himself. However, Zatch's allies storm the room to defend him. Dufort uses his esper abilities to gauge the allies' minds and handily incapacitates them with Zeno's spells, eliminating Riya as well. Tia becomes so desperate to protect Zatch and company that the faint line on her book fully appears for Megumi to read.
149	49	"The inheritor of Baou. Gash vs. Zeon. Jigadirasu's thunder." Transliteration: "Baou wo tsugomono Gasshu tai Zeon Jigadirasu no ikazuchi" (Japanese: バオウを継ぐもの ガッシュVSゼオン ジカティラスの雷)	March 26, 2006	—
As Zeno launches his strongest spell Zigadiras Zakerga, Megumi uses her last ounce of strength to read out Chajir Seshirdon, which allows Tia to shield Zatch and allies from the attack; however, they pass out from exhaustion, forcing Zatch and Kiyo to fight on their own. During the grueling battle, Kiyo realizes that Dufort never read his mind. A frustrated Dufort peers into Kiyo's thoughts to learn of his next moves and instead sees images of all the characters he befriended. Overcome with despair, Dufort falls into a catatonic state, making him unable to cast spells. Discovering how much Zatch's friends have helped, Zeno attempts to erase Zatch's memories again in hopes of demoralizing him, but Zatch resists him, causing Bao to awaken and changing his spellbook from red to gold. Panicked, Zeno and Dufort try to eliminate Zatch with Zigadiras Zakerga, but Zatch counters it with Bao Zakerga, the two spells colliding with equal might.
150	50	"Decisive battle against Faudo! The golden radiance. The kind king." Transliteration: "Kessen! Faūdo Konjiki no kagayaki Yasashii ousama" (Japanese: 決戦! ファウード 金色の輝き やさしい王様)	March 26, 2006	—
With an invigorated Bao, Zatch overtakes Zeno's attack and ousts him to the Mamodo world. Despite his defeat, Zeno destroys the gem and dares Zatch to use Bao on Faudo instead. With Faudo out of control and on pace to eradicate the human world, Zatch and allies use a teleporter to send everyone off Faudo to safety, only for Kiyo to beam the allies away as well, over their objections, insisting that Zatch is strong enough to defeat it. As Faudo rapidly closes in on Mochinoki, Zatch and Kiyo get help from Brago and Sherry who use a spell to halt its advance, allowing them to teleport into position on the beach. With Bao Zakerga, Zatch summons a colossal three-headed manifestation of Bao that vaporizes Faudo, saving the town and ending the threat to Earth; an exhausted Kiyo collapses as Zatch celebrates their victory. In the post-credit scene, Zatch and Brago, now the only two Mamodo left on Earth, meet at a grassland with their partners and commence the final battle for Mamodo king.
