= List of Zatch Bell! chapters =

First tankōbon volume cover, released by Shogakukan on May 18, 2001

The Zatch Bell! manga was written and illustrated by Makoto Raiku. Formally titled Konjiki no Gash!! (金色のガッシュ!!, lit. Golden Gash!!), the story focuses on the title character Zatch Bell, who is one of a hundred Mamodo participating in an elimination tournament on Earth for the crown of the Mamodo world. The series chronicles Zatch's strengthening bond with his human partner, Kiyo Takamine, and his struggles through the tournament, culminating with his eventual win and subsequent departure from Earth. The series ran for 323 chapters in Shogakukan's shōnen manga magazine Weekly Shōnen Sunday from January 10, 2001, to December 26, 2007. The chapters were collected in thirty-three tankōbon volumes released from May 8, 2001, to June 18, 2008.

In North America, the manga was published in English language by Viz Media; twenty-five volumes were released from August 2, 2005, to June 9, 2009. The manga was also published in English by Chuang Yi in Singapore.

For the series' tenth anniversary, Raiku launched a one-shot chapter titled Konjiki no Gash!! Gaiden "Tomo" (金色のガッシュ!! 外伝「友」, lit. Golden Gash!! Side Story "Friend"), which depicts Zatch in the events after the tournament and preceding his coronation as king, and was published in Kodansha's shōnen manga magazine Bessatsu Shōnen Magazine on March 9, 2011; the chapter was included as an extra chapter in the sixth volume of Raiku's Animal Land series. Kodansha also reprinted the series in a sixteen-volume bunkoban edition between March 8, 2011, and June 7, 2012. Raiku self-published a sixteen-volume kanzenban edition, released digitally starting in July 2018, and physically in April 2019, in response to popular demand. A sequel series titled Konjiki no Gash!! 2 (金色のガッシュ!! 2, Konjiki no Gasshu!! 2) was released online starting March 14, 2022.

== Volumes ==
No.	Original release date	Original ISBN	English release date	English ISBN
01	May 18, 2001	4-09-126231-7	August 2, 2005	978-1-59116-586-6
001. "Operation "Hero of Justice"" (清麿、正義の味方, "Kiyomaro, Seigi no Mikata"); 002. "The Unreadable Book" (読めない本, "Yomenai Hon"); 003. "A Shock to the Heart" (心の電撃, "Kokoro Dengeki"); 004. "Kiyo, Mr. Popular" (清麿、人気者, "Kiyomaro, Ninkimono"); 005. "A Tool or a Person!?" (道具か人間か!?, "Dōgu ka Ningen ka!?"); 006. "Kiyo's Trump Card" (清麿の切り札, "Kiyomaro no Kirifuda"); 007. "The First Fight" (初ゲンカ, "Hatsu Genka"); 008. "The Qualifications to be King" (王への資格, "Ō e no Shikaku")
02	August 9, 2001	4-09-126232-5	August 2, 2005	978-1-59116-588-0
009. "My Turn" (オレの番, "Ore no Ban"); 010. "The Battle with Destiny" (運命との戦い, "Unmei to no Tatakai"); 011. "Kiyo in the Hospital" (清麿の入院, "Kiyomaro no Nyūin"); 012. "Where is the Book?!" (本はどこに!?, "Hon wa Doko ni!?"); 013. "A Moving Target" (動く標的, "Ugoku Hyōteki"); 014. "A Heroic Heart" (守る心, "Mamoru Kokoro"); 015. "The Limit of Strength" (力の限界, "Chikara no Genkai"); 016. "A Real Family" (本当の家族, "Hontō no Kazoku"); 017. "A Mamodo's Tears" (魔物の涙, "Mamono no Namida"); 018. "A Gentle King" (やさしい王様, "Yasashii Ōsama")
03	October 18, 2001	4-09-126233-3	October 11, 2005	978-1-59116-590-3
019. "The Third Spell" (第三の呪文, "Daisan no Jumon"); 020. "An Incalculable Hope" (計算外の希望, "Keisan-gai no Kibō"); 021. "The Curry of Friendship" (友情のカレー, "Yūjō no Karē"); 022. "A Pointless Fight" (ムダな争い, "Mudana Arasoi"); 023. "A Mother's Wish" (ママの願い, "Mama no Negai"); 024. "The Appearance of Strength" (強き姿, "Tsuyoki Sugata"); 025. "My Will" (僕の意志, "Boku no Ishi"); 026. "Kind Kiyo" (やさしい清麿, "Yasashii Kiyomaro"); 027. "The Invincible Hero" (無敵の英雄, "Muteki no Eiyū"); 028. "A Conquerable Foe" (勝てる相手, "Kateru Aite")
04	January 18, 2002	4-09-126234-1	December 20, 2005	978-1-4215-0282-3
029. "The Fighting Sculptor" (石像の挑戦状, "Sekizō no Chōsenjō"); 030. "The Riddle of Invulnerability" (不死身の謎, "Fujimi no Nazo"); 031. "A Final Message" (最後の伝言, "Saigo no Dengon"); 032. "Zatch's Secrets" (ガッシュの秘密, "Gasshu no Himitsu"); 033. "A Mother's Love" (母の思い, "Haha no Omoi"); 034. "The Worst Teacher" (最低の先生, "Saitei no Sensei"); 035. "A World of Enemies" (敵だけの世界, "Teki Dake no Sekai"); 036. "A Solitary Soldier" (孤独な戦士, "Kodokuna Senshi"); 037. "The Culmination of Battle" (戦いの蓄積, "Tatakai no Chikuseki"); 038. "A Trustworthy Friend" (信じられる仲間, "Shinjirareru Nakama")
05	April 18, 2002	4-09-126235-X	February 21, 2006	978-1-4215-0283-0
039. "Kiyo's Summer Break" (清麿の夏休み, "Kiyomaro no Natsuyasumi"); 040. "A Country of Gentlemen" (紳士の国, "Shinshi no Kuni"); 041. "The Monster in the Old Castle" (古城の悪魔, "Kojō no Akuma"); 042. "The Indomitable Warrior" (不屈の勇者, "Fukutsu no Yūsha"); 043. "The Biggest Mamodo" (最大の魔物, "Saidai no Mamono"); 044. "Beyond Fear" (怖さを越えて, "Kowasa o Koete"); 045. "Kiyo's Father" (清麿の父, "Kiyomaro no Chichi"); 046. "The Puppet Master" (操りし者, "Ayatsurishi Mono"); 047. "The Forest of Spirits" (妖精の森, "Yōsei no Mori"); 048. "The Stolen Memory" (奪われた記憶, "Ubawareta Kioku")
06	July 18, 2002	4-09-126236-8	April 18, 2006	978-1-4215-0387-5
049. "The Mysterious Dance" (不思議な踊り, "Fushigina Odori"); 050. "A Battle Without a Spell" (呪文抜きの戦い, "Jumon Nuki no Tatakai"); 051. "A Warrior's Commitment" (戦士の覚悟, "Senshi no Kakugo"); 052. "The Unwanted Reunion" (迷惑な再会, "Meiwakuna Saikai"); 053. "An Important Matter" (大切な用, "Taisetsuna Yō"); 054. "An Irreplaceable Friend" (無二の親友, "Muni no Shin'yū"); 055. "The Dark Tunnel" (暗いトンネル, "Kurai Tonneru"); 056. "Meru-Meru-Me~" (メルメルメ～); 057. "Until Then" (その時まで, "Sono Tokimade")
07	October 18, 2002	4-09-126237-6	June 20, 2006	978-1-4215-0513-8
058. "What Happened to Suzy?" (スズメの異変, "Suzume no Ihen"); 059. "The Man of Freedom" (自由な男, "Jiyūna Otoko"); 060. "Unlimited Power" (底知れぬ力, "Sokoshirenu Chikara"); 061. "Kiyo's Strength" (清麿の強さ, "Kiyomaro no Tsuyosa"); 062. "The Most Powerful Spell" (最大の術, "Saidai no Jutsu"); 063. "The Battle in the Park" (公園の決闘, "Kōen no Kettō"); 064. "The Masterpiece" (感動の彫刻, "Kandō no Chōkoku"); 065. "Danny's Power" (ダニーの力, "Danī no Chikara"); 066. "Mission Accomplished" (やりとげた仕事, "Yaritogeta Shigoto")
08	December 18, 2002	4-09-126238-4	August 15, 2006	978-1-4215-0514-5
067. "The Best Team Ever" (最強のコンビ, "Saikyō no Konbi"); 068. "The Lightning Spell Shot Toward the Sky" (空への電撃, "Sora e no Dengeki"); 069. "The Violent Woman" (凶暴な女, "Kyōbōna Onna"); 070. "A Home-Cooked Meal with Love" (愛の手料理, "Ai no Teryōri"); 071. "An Important Person" (大切な人, "Taisetsuna Hito"); 072. "The Dangerous Island" (危険な島, "Kikenna Shima"); 073. "The Courage to Fight" (戦う勇気, "Tatakau Yūki"); 074. "The Fifth Spell" (第五の術, "Daigo no Jutsu"); Bonus Section. "Two Princesses" (二人の王女, "Futari no Ōjo")
09	March 18, 2003	4-09-126239-2	October 10, 2006	978-1-4215-0515-2
075. "Zatch's Cold" (ガッシュの風邪, "Gasshu no Kaze"); 076. "A Measure of Strength" (力の差, "Chikara no Sa"); 077. "Fearless Heart" (ゆるがない心, "Yuruganai Kokoro"); 078. "A Happy Day" (幸せな1日, "Shiawasena Ichinichi"); 079. "The True Hero" (真のヒーロー, "Shin no Hīrō"); 080. "The Invisible Hunter" (姿なき狩人(ハンター), "Sugata Naki Hantā"); 081. "Hunter Vs Prey" (獲物VS.狩人(ハンター), "Emono VS. Hantā"); 082. "The Prey" (狩られる側, "Karareru Gawa"); 083. "An Unidentified Object" (未知の物体, "Michi no Buttai"); 084. "The Mystery of the Stone Tablet" (石版の謎, "Sekiban no Nazo")
10	April 18, 2003	4-09-126240-6	December 12, 2006	978-1-4215-0516-9
085. "A Reliable Brother" (頼れる兄, "Tayoreru Ani"); 086. "The Brother's Battle" (兄ちゃんの戦い, "Nīchan no Tatakai"); 087. "The Last Hope" (最後の希望, "Saigo no Kibō"); 088. "The Reason Behind Invincibility" (不死身の理由, "Fujimi no Riyū"); 089. "Facing Forward" (前に向かって, "Mae ni Mukatte"); 090. "Not Strong Enough" (甘き強さ, "Amaki Tsuyosa"); 091. "The Missing" (足りないもの, "Tarinai Mono"); 092. "The Difficult Path" (困難な道, "Konnanna Michi"); 093. "Who's the Owner?" (飼い主は誰?, "Kainushi wa Dare?"); 094. "An Important Role" (大切な役目, "Taisetsuna Yakume")
11	June 18, 2003	4-09-126451-4	February 13, 2007	978-1-4215-0830-6
095. "The Majestic 12" (12人の刺客, "Jūni-nin no Shikaku"); 096. "The Secret of the Book" (本の秘密, "Hon no Himitsu"); 097. "The Sixth Spell" (第六の術, "Dairoku no Jutsu"); 098. "The Chances of Winning in 30 Seconds" (30秒の勝機, "Sanjū-byō Shōki"); 099. "The King's Appearance" (王の風格, "Ō no Fūkaku"); 100. "Feelings From the Bottom of the Heart" (誠実な感じ, "Seijitsuna Kanji"); 101. "The Worst Match" (最悪の相性, "Saiaku no Aishō"); 102. "Expression of Anger" (怒りの形相, "Ikari no Keisō"); 103. "The Evil Power" (悪しき力, "Ashiki Chikara")
12	August 8, 2003	4-09-126452-2	April 10, 2007	978-1-4215-0831-3
104. "The Rematch" (再試合(リターンマッチ), "Ritānmatchi"); 105. "The Mamodo From a Thousand Years Ago" (千年前の戦士, "Sennenmae no Senshi"); 106. "The Emotionless Enemy" (感情なき敵, "Kanjō Naki Teki"); 107. "You Get What You Deserve" (自業自得, "Jigōjitoku"); 108. "The Light" (光, "Hikari"); 109. "The Identity of Milordo-Z" (ロードの正体, "Rōdo no Shōtai"); 110. "The Letter" (手紙, "Tegami"); 111. "The Crybaby" (泣き虫, "Nakimushi"); 112. "Kanchomé's Power" (キャンチョメの力, "Kyanchome no Chikara"); 113. "The Battery" (力の電池(バッテリー), "Chikara no Batterī")
13	November 15, 2003	4-09-126453-0	June 12, 2007	978-1-4215-0832-0
114. "Choosing the Way to Fight" (戦い方の選択, "Tatakaikata no Sentaku"); 115. "The Maximum Multiplied by the Maximum" (最大×最大, "Saidai × Saidai"); 116. "The Promise" (約束, "Yakusoku"); 117. "The Arrival of "V"" ("V(Bui)"の襲来, ""Bui" no Shūrai"); 118. "The Glowing Ball" (光る球, "Hikaru Tama"); 119. "The Combination Strategy!" (共同作戦(コンビネーション)!, "Konbinēshon Sakusen"); 120. "The Partner" (パートナー, "Pātonā"); 121. "The Reason for Not Getting Along" (なつかない理由, "Natsukanai Riyū"); 122. "The Strong Eye" (強い瞳, "Tsuyoi Hitomi"); 123. "Strong and Deep" (強く深く, "Tsuyoku Fukaku")
14	January 17, 2004	4-09-126454-9	August 14, 2007	978-1-4215-0833-7
124. "Conversations of the Heart" (心の会話, "Kokoro no Kaiwa"); 125. "The Entrusted Book" (託された本, "Takusa reta Hon"); 126. "Fighting Together" (ともに戦う, "Tomoni Tatakau"); 127. "The Most Powerful Mamodo" (最強の魔物, "Saikyō no Mamono"); 128. "A Single Path" (一本の道, "Ippon no Michi"); 129. "Emergency" (エマージェンシー, "Emājenshī"); 130. "The Perfect Martial Art" (完璧な格闘技, "Kanpekina Kakutōgi"); 131. "Seeking Strength" (強さを求めて, "Tsuyosa o Motomete"); 132. "What Remains" (残るもの, "Nokoru mono"); 133. "The King Who Protects" (守る王様, "Mamoru Ōsama")
15	March 18, 2004	4-09-126455-7	October 9, 2007	978-1-4215-0834-4
134. "Let's sing Together" (一緒に歌おう, "Issho ni Utaou"); 135. "The Person that knows nothing" (何もしてない人, "Nani mo Shi Tenai Hito"); 136. "My King" (僕の王様, "Boku no Ōsama"); 137. "12 Comrades" (12人の仲間, "Jūni-nin no Nakama"); 138. "The Secret of Strength" (強さの秘密, "Tsuyosa no Himitsu"); 139. "The Fear of the Lithograph" (石版の恐怖, "Han no Kyōfu"); 140. "The Light pointing towards Darkness" (闇に指す光, "Yami ni Sasu Hikari"); 141. "One More Face" (もうひとつのかお, "Mō Hitotsu no Kao"); 142. "The Unforgiven One" (許せぬ者, "Yurusenu Mono"); 143. "Sherry's Line" (シェリーの線, "Sherī no Sen")
16	June 18, 2004	4-09-126456-5	December 11, 2007	978-1-4215-0835-1
144. "To the Battlefield..." (戦いの場へ…, "Tatakai no Ba e..."); 145. "Auto Control" (自動制御(オートコントロール), " Ōtokontorōru"); 146. "The Curse of the Stone" (石の呪縛, "Ishi no Jubaku"); 147. "Guardian of the Stone" (「月の石」の番人, ""Tsuki no Ishi" no Bannin"); 148. "The Horrifying Scream" (戦慄の雄叫び, "Senritsu no Otakebi"); 149. "The Worst Two" (最凶のふたり, "Sai Kyō no Futari"); 150. "The Slight Ray of Light" (かすかな光, "Kasukana Hikari"); 151. "The Unexpected Light" (思わぬ光, "Omowanu Hikari"); 152. "The Final Favor" (最後のワガママ, "Saigo no Wagamama"); 153. "Holding Hands..." (手をつないで…, "Shi Tewotsunaide...")
17	August 5, 2004	4-09-126457-3 (normal Ed.); 4-09-159023-3 (special Ed.)	February 12, 2008	978-1-4215-1528-1
154. "The Forbidden Spell" (禁断の呪文, "Kindan no Jumon"); 155. "The Seventh Spell" (第七の術, "Dainana no Jutsu"); 156. "Come On, Zatch" (さあ ガッシュ, "Sā Gasshu"); 157. "Not Over Yet" (まだ終わらない, "Mada Owaranai"); 158. "My True Self" (本当の姿, "Hontō no Sugata"); 159. "The Sun and The Moon" (お日様とお月様, "Ohisama to Otsukisama"); 160. "To Prepare For This Moment" (今のために, "Ima no Tame ni"); 161. "The Final Revenge" (最後の仕返し, "Saigo no Shikaeshi"); 162. "Promise To Become The King" (必ず、王に, "Kanarazu, Ō ni"); Side Story. "Dr. Riddles and Kedo's Journey of Light" (ナゾナゾ博士とキッドの光の旅, "Nazonazo-hakase to Kiddo no Hikari no Tabi")
18	November 18, 2004	4-09-126458-1	April 8, 2008	978-1-4215-1711-7
163. "We're Home" (ただいま, "Tadaima"); 164. "An Uncomfortable Stare" (気になる視線, "Ki ni Naru Shisen"); 165. "Q's Almighty Transformations!" (Q万能変形!, "Kyū Bannō Henkei!"); 166. "Superior Data" (データ超越, "Dēta Chōetsu"); 167. "Something Impossible" (ありえないもの, "Arienai mono"); 168. "Find the Gift!" (贈り物を探せ!, "Okurimono o Sagase!"); 169. "The Boy Who Speaks To The Wind" (風を語る少年, "Kaze o Kataru Shōnen"); 170. "Ted and Jido" (テッドとジード, "Teddo to Jīdo"); 171. "My Friend" (オレの友達, "Ore no Tomodachi"); 172. "The Power of Bao" (バオウの力, "Baou no Chikara")
19	January 14, 2005	4-09-126459-X	June 10, 2008	978-1-4215-1712-4
173. "I'm Not A Coward" (臆病者じゃない, "Okubyōmono Janai"); 174. "Come Back Safe" (必ず元気に, }"Kanarazu Genki ni"); 175. "Ignite Your Fighting Spirit!" (闘志を燃やせ, "Tōshi o Moyase"); 176. "Something Other Than A Structure" (建造物ではない何か, "Kenzōbutsude de Wanai Nanika"); 177. "My Classmates" (オレのクラスメート, "Gasshu Ate no Tegami"); 178. "The Letter For Zatch" (ガッシュ宛の手紙, "Ore no Kurasumēto"); 179. "That Person..." (あのお方…, "Ano Okata..."); 180. "Meeting in The Mamodo World" (魔界での出会い, "Makai de no Deai"); 181. "A Scary Appearance" (おそろしい姿, "Osoroshii Sugata"); 182. "It's Okay Now" (もう大丈夫, "Mōdaijōbu")
20	March 18, 2005	4-09-126460-3	August 12, 2008	978-1-4215-1713-1
183. "Kyle's Shout" (カイルの叫び, "Kairu no Sakebi"); 184. "Oh My" (オヨヨ, "Oyoyo"); 185. "The Awakening" (芽生え, "Mebae"); 186. "A Frightening Spell" (怖い術, "Kowai Jutsu"); 187. "Kiyo's Mood" (清麿の雰囲, "Kiyomaro no Funi"); 188. "The Power of Riou" (リオウの力, "Riou no Chikara"); 189. "Faudo's True Form" (ファウードの正体, "Faūdo no Shōtai"); 190. "The Sealed Mamodo" (封印された魔物, "Fūin sa Reta Mamono"); 191. "Bari's Rival" (バリーのライバル, "Barī no Raibaru"); 192. "A Bad Feeling" (イヤな感じ, "Iyana Kanji")
21	July 15, 2005	4-09-127291-6	October 14, 2008	978-1-4215-1714-8
193. "Kanchomé's Courage" (キャンチョメの覚悟, "Kyanchome no Kakugo"); 194. "A Strong Desire" (「強い思い」, ""Tsuyoi Omoi""); 195. "The Last Spell" (最後の術, "Saigo no Jutsu"); 196. "A New Encounter" (新たな遭遇, "Aratana Sōgū"); 197. "Prepared" (覚悟, "Kakugo"); 198. "What It Takes To Be King" (王の資質, "Ō no Shishitsu"); 199. "The First Test" (最初の試練, "Saisho no Shiren"); 200. "Meru-Meru-Me~!" (メルメルメ～?, "Merumerume~?"); 201. "The Exit" (脱出口, "Dasshutsukō"); 202. "The True Heart" (真実の心, "Shinjitsu no Kokoro")
22	August 5, 2005	4-09-127292-4	December 9, 2008	978-1-4215-1715-5
203. "Things I Must Protect" (守るべきもの, "Mamorubeki mono"); 204. "The End Of The Maze" (迷路の先に…, "Meiro no Saki ni..."); 205. "I'm Scared, But" (怖いけど…, "Kowai Kedo..."); 206. "Arth's Intentions" (アースの思惑, "Āsu no Omowaku"); 207. "Offense and Defense" (攻防, "Kōbō"); 208. "The Light of Hope" (王の資質, "Kibō no Hikari"); 209. "The Resurrection of Faudo" (ファウード復活, "Faūdo Fukkatsu"); 210. "In Order To Live" (生き抜くために, "Ikinuku Tame ni"); 211. "The Brain Strategy" (頭脳戦, "Zunōsen"); 212. "The Worst-case Scenario" (真実の心, "Saiaku no Shinario")
23	November 18, 2005	4-09-127293-2	February 10, 2009	978-1-4215-2238-8
213. "No Matter What Happens" (何が起ころうとも, "Nani ga Okoroutomo"); 214. "Become The King" (王になれ, "Ō ni Nare"); 215. "Can You Hear Me?" (届かない声, "Todokanai Koe"); 216. "A Fistful Of Emotion" (拳にこめた想い, "Ken ni Kometa Omoi"); 217. "Too Strong" (格の違い, "Kaku no Chigai"); 218. "The Theft of Faudo" (ファウード強奪, "Faūdo Gōdatsu"); 219. "Preparation" (それぞれの覚悟, "Sorezore no Kakugo"); 220. "A Hopeless Resistance" (勝算なき抵抗, "Shōsan Naki Teikō"); 221. "Even If I Can't See You" (姿見えずとも, "Sugata Miezutomo"); 222. "Determination" (二人の決断, "Futari no Ketsudan"); 223. "The Last Smile" (最後の笑顔, "Saigo no Egao")
24	March 17, 2006	4-09-120124-5	April 14, 2009	978-1-4215-2239-5
224. "The Beginning Of The End" (絶望へのスタート, "Zetsubō e no Sutāto"); 225. "The Path to the Brain" (脳への道, "Nō e no Michi"); 226. "The Power of Godufa" (「ゴデュファ」の力, ""Godyufa" no Chikara"); 227. "Our Duty" (それぞれの役目, "Sorezore no Yakume"); 228. "The Difference" (大きな違い, "Ōkinachigai"); 229. "Just As I Planned" (計画通り, "Keikakudōri"); 230. "I Don't Care Anymore" (どうでもよくなった理由, "Dō Demo Yoku Natta Riyū"); 231. "The 800 Doors" (数の鉄扉, "Sū no Teppi"); 232. "The Indestructible Terror" (ぬぐえぬ恐怖, "Nuguenu Kyōfu"); 233. "Asking For Help" (助けを求めてる, "Tasuke o Motome Teru")
25	June 16, 2006	4-09-120420-1	June 9, 2009	978-1-4215-2240-1
234. "Please Remember" (思い出してくれ, "Omoide Shite Kure"); 235. "A Jewel In The Dump" (はきだめの宝石, "Hakidame no Hōseki"); 236. "The One I've Been Looking At" (ずっと見てんのは…, "Zutto mi Ten no wa..."); 237. "The Light Of Friendship" (仲間という光, "Nakama to iu Hikari..."); 238. "He Looks Big" (大きく見える, "Ōkiku Mieru"); 239. "A New Level of Strength" (段違いの強さ, "Danchigai no Tsuyosa"); 240. "The Eyes of a Lion" (ライオンの目, "Raion no Me"); 241. "What Am I Doing!?" (何をやってんだ!?, "Nani o Yatten da!?"); 242. "We Have The Power" (まだ力が出せる, "Mada Chikara ga Daseru"); 243. "The Promise" (約束の絆, "Yakusoku no Kizuna")
26	September 15, 2006	4-09-120590-9	August 11, 2009 (canceled)	978-1-42-152241-8
244. "A Joyous Battle" (嬉しい戦い, "Ureshii Tatakai"); 245. "Two Who Stand in the Way" (立ちふさがる2体, "Tachifusagaru Ni Karada"); 246. "I'll Do My Best" (がんばれ僕, "Ganbare Boku"); 247. "Absolutely Not" (絶対にさせない, "Zettai ni Sasenai"); 248. "Unshakable Resolve" (不退転の決意, "Futaiten no Ketsui"); 249. "Burdening Thoughts" (背負った思い, "Shotta Omoi"); 250. "Bell of Hope" (希望の鐘, "Kibō no Kane"); 251. "Until Kiyomaro Comes" (清麿が来るまで, "Kiyomaro ga Kuru Made"); 252. "Last Chance" (最後のチャンス, "Saigo no Chansu"); 253. "That Voice..." (その声の主は…, "Sono Goe no Shiwa...")
27	December 16, 2006	4-09-120698-0	October 27, 2009 (canceled)	978-1-42-152242-5
254. "The Ones Momon Believed In" (モモンの信じた人達, "Momon no Shinjita Hito"); 255. "A New Power" (新たな力, "Aratana Chikara"); 256. "Digging Your Own Grave..." (自ら墓穴を…, "Mizukara Boketsu o..."); 257. "Faudo Approaches" (ファウード接近, "Faūdo Sekkin"); 258. "Gash and Zeon" (ガッシュとゼオン, "Gasshu to Zeon"); 259. "The Reason for the Struggle" (背負った思い, "Shotta Omoi"); 260. "Dufaux's Power" (デュフォーの能力, "Dyufō no Nōryoku"); 261. "Baou Zakeruga" (バオウ・ザケルガ, "Baou Zakeruga"); 262. "Engulfing Darkness" (喰いつくす闇, "Kui Tsukusu Yami"); 263. "Mysterious Attack" (謎の攻撃, "Nazo no Kōgeki")
28	March 16, 2007	978-4-09-121023-4	December 18, 2009 (canceled)	978-1-42-152243-2
264. "Sniper" (スナイパー, "Sunaipā"); 265. "Cherish's Aim" (チェリッシュの狙い, "Cherisshu no Nerai"); 266. "Tio's Cry" (ティオの叫び, "Tio no Sakebi"); 267. "This Shield is Strong!" (この盾は強い!, "Kono Tate wa Tsuyoi!"); 268. "Still Haven't Faced Forward" (まだ前を向ける, "Mada Mae o Mukeru"); 269. "You're the Only One" (お前しかいない, "Omae Shika Inai"); 270. "Listen to Me" (言うことを聞くのだ, "Iu Koto o Kiku Noda"); 271. "A Sorrowful Power" (悲しき力, "Kanashiki Chikara"); 272. "This is the Answer" (これが答えだ, "Kore ga Kotaeda"); 273. "Zeon's Wish" (ゼオンの願い, "Zeon no Negai")
29	June 18, 2007	978-4-09-121077-7	–	—
274. "Faudo's Rampage" (ファウード暴走, "Faūdo Bōsō"); 275. "I Know These Tears" (この涙は知っている, "Kono Namida wa Shitte Iru"); 276. "A New Class" (新しいクラス, "Atarashii Kurasu"); 277. "Ahaha" (アッハッハッ, "Ahhahhaa"); 278. "Zeon's Letter" (ゼオンの手紙, "Zeon no Tegami"); 279. "The Time Has Come" (この時が来た, "Kono Toki ga Kita"); 280. "The King's Privilege" (王の特権, "Ō no Tokken"); 281. "Gorm and Mir" (ゴームとミール, "Gōmu to Mīru"); 282. "The Joy of Life" (生きる喜び, "Ikiru Yorokobi"); 283. "I Will Pass It on" (必ず伝える, "Kanarazu Tsutaeru")
30	September 18, 2007	978-4-09-121185-9	–	—
284. "Clear Note" (クリア・ノート, "Kuria Nōto"); 285. "Give Up" (あきらめろ, "Akiramero"); 286. "Eyes of A Devil" (悪魔の目, "Akuma no Me"); 287. "Prodigy of the Dragon Tribe" (竜族の神童, "Ryū-zoku no Shindō"); 288. "Still Stronger" (まだ上がある, "Mada Ue ga aru"); 289. "The Hope of Demonkind and the Demon World" (魔物と魔界の光, "Mamono to Makai no Hikari"); 290. "Ultimate Spell vs. Ultimate Spell" (最大術VS最大術, "Saidai Jutsu VS Saidai Jutsu"); 291. "An Entrusted Wish" (願いを託して, "Negai o Takushite"); 292. "Ten Months Left" (残り10か月, "Nokori Jū-kagetsu"); 293. "Special Training Regimen" (特訓計画, "Kanarazu Tsutaeru")
31	December 15, 2007	978-4-09-121227-6	–	—
294. "Kanchome's Transformation" (キャンチョメの変化, "Kyanchome no Henka"); 295. "A New Star" (新人タレント, "Shinjin Tarento"); 296. "My First Friend" (初めての友達, "Hajimete no Tomodachi"); 297. "Why Are You Going So Far?" (なんでそこまで, "Nande Soko Made"); 298. "Unascertained Strength" (はかり知れぬ強さ, "Hakari Shirenu Tsuyosa"); 299. "Even Though You're Strong" (たとえ強くても, "Tatoe Tsuyokute mo"); 300. "The Lion and the Hippo" (ライオンとカバ, "Raion to Kaba"); 301. "Geez, These Tears..." (もう、涙が…, "Mō, Namida ga..."); 302. "Carrying Their Hope" (背負ってる, "Shotteru"); 303. "Gorm's Friend" (ゴームの友達, "Gōmu no Tomodachi")
32	March 18, 2008	978-4-09-121296-2	–	—
304. "The Departure" (出発, "Shuppatsu"); 305. "Reliable Friends" (頼もしき仲間, "Tanomoshiki Nakama"); 306. "The Results of Our Training" (修行で得たもの, "Shugyō de Eta mono"); 307. "Path of Friends" (友の道, "Tomo no Michi"); 308. "I Will Protect Everyone" (みんなを守る, "Minna o Mamoru"); 309. "See You... Tomorrow" (また…明日, "Mata... Ashita"); 310. "The Strongest Ally" (最強の味方, "Saikyō no Mikata"); 311. "Lifelong Friends" (生涯の友, "Shōgai no Tomo"); 312. "Brago's Plan" (ブラゴの作戦, "Burago no Sakusen"); 313. "United "Thought..."" (「思い」を一つに…, ""Omoi" o Hitotsu ni...")
33	June 18, 2008	978-4-09-121399-0	–	—
314. "Reign of Power" (力の支配, "Chikara no Shihai"); 315. "The Answer..." (答えが…, "Kotae ga..."); 316. "That Brilliance..." (あの輝きは…, "Ano Kagayaki wa..."); 317. "Gash's Friends" (ガッシュの仲間, "Gasshu no Nakama"); 318. "Even More Friends" (さらなる仲間, "Saranaru Nakama"); 319. ""The Power" of the Golden Book" (金色の本の「力」, "Konjiki no Hon no "Chikara""); 320. "Graduation" (卒業式, "Sotsugyōshiki"); 321. "The Final Battle" (最後の戦い, "Saigo no Tatakai"); 322. "The Time Has Come" (いざ さらば, "Iza Saraba"); 323. "Epilogue: A Letter from Gash" (最終話 ガッシュからの手紙, "Saishūwa Gasshu kara no Tegami")
