= Zatch Bell! season 1 =

Season of anime series

Zatch Bell!
- Season 1
- The cover of the first DVD compilation of Zatch Bell! released by Viz Media on November 8, 2005
- No. of episodes: 50

Release
- Original network: Fuji Television
- Original release: April 6, 2003 – March 28, 2004

Season chronology
- Next → Season 2

The first season, retroactively titled level 1, of the Zatch Bell! anime series was directed by Tetsuji Nakamura and Yukio Kaizawa and produced by Toei Animation. Based on the manga series by Makoto Raiku, the plot follows the adventures of Zatch Bell, a Mamodo who is sent to Earth and partnered with the human Kiyo Takamine for a battle that adjudges the new monarchy of the Mamodo world. The first season of the TV series, known formally as Konjiki no Gash Bell!! (金色のガッシュベル!!, lit. "Golden Gash Bell!!"), ran from April 6, 2003, to March 28, 2004, on Fuji TV. The season adapts volumes 1 through 11 of the manga, (Note: Tankōbon edition.) and also features original, self-contained subplots.

Viz Media provided the English dub of the anime, which aired on Cartoon Network's Toonami and Miguzi scheduling blocks in the United States and on YTV's Bionix programming block in Canada starting March 5, 2005. The episodes were collected into seventeen DVD compilations and released by Shogakukan between November 19, 2003, and April 20, 2005. The dubbed episodes of this season were collected into thirteen DVD compilations and released by Viz Media between November 8, 2005, and December 4, 2007.

Four pieces of theme music are used throughout the season: one opening theme and two closing themes in the Japanese episodes, and a single theme each for the opening and ending in the dubbed episodes. The opening theme for the Japanese release is "Kasabuta" (カサブタ, lit. "Scab") by Hidenori Chiwata—this song would be used again as an ending theme for the series finale. The first ending theme is "Personal" by Aya Ueto, used up to episode 30; and the second ending theme is "Stars" by King for the rest of the season. Additionally, the song Boku wa koko ni Iru (ぼくはここにいる, lit. "I'm here") by Rino was used as an insert theme in episode 22. The opening theme in the English airing is "Zatch Bell! Theme" by Thorsten Laewe and Greg Prestopino, with an instrumental version selected as the closing theme.

== Summary ==
The series opens with an amnesiac Zatch Bell meeting up with Kiyo Takamine at his home in Mochinoki, Japan, in the 2000s. Kiyo is initially hostile toward him, but he soon learns that Zatch is one of a hundred Mamodo vying for the crown of the Mamodo world, and that they are waging a tournament by partnering with humans to attack one another with spells, the loser returning to the Mamodo world. Realizing that he is Zatch's partner, Kiyo vows to carry him to victory at any cost. While confronting more of Zatch's kind, they come across a gentle-hearted Mamodo named Kolulu whose spell transforms her into a beast with violent instincts. This would propel Zatch's goal of becoming a "benevolent king" and ending the cycle of tournaments forever. He and Kiyo also form alliances with other Mamodo and their human partners, who occasionally assist them throughout the season.

As the tournament wears on, Zatch and Kiyo journey to England to investigate a claim of a Mamodo resembling Zatch seen there, and explore Zatch's forgotten origins. They also defeat a Baltro and his partner Stein to rescue Kiyo's father, Professor Seitaro Takamine, who then gives his son a 1,000-year-old lithograph bearing a Mamodo for analysis. At the end of the season, the artifact goes missing, and Kido and his partner Dr. Riddles battle Zatch to help him gain more spells. Riddles then divulges that he attempted to steal the lithograph for safekeeping, but someone else reclaimed it; he therefore warns Zatch and Kiyo to be ready when they are needed.

== Episodes list ==
All episodes are directed by Tetsuji Nakamura and Yukio Kaizawa.

No. overall	No. in season	English dub title / Japanese-translated title	Original release date	English air date
1	1	"The Lightning Boy from Another World!" / "The Lightning Boy from Demon World"; Transliteration: "Makai kara kita Dengeki shōnen" (Japanese: 魔界から来た電撃少年)	April 6, 2003	March 5, 2005
An forgetful Mamodo named Zatch Bell flies on an eagle into the fictitious town of Mochinoki, Japan. He reaches the house of Kiyo Takamine, an intelligent yet socially introverted 14-year-old boy, and hands him a letter from his father Prof. Seitaro Takamine, who sent him along with a red book bearing enigmatic printings. Upset at the intrusion, Kiyo shouts at Zatch, accidentally making him shoot lightning from his mouth. At school, Kiyo dupes Zatch into going to the rooftop to avoid him. There, Zatch meets Kiyo's classmates Suzy Mizuno, who has a crush on Kiyo, and Kane, a bully who accosts them both. Regretting his choice, Kiyo intervenes, but Kane gives him a beating. However, a skateboarder named Eido Kubozuka and a Mamodo named Hyde swoop in and brush off Kane with a blast of wind. Eido attacks Kiyo and Zatch and tries to take Suzy as his girlfriend against her will. Seeing that Hyde is characteristically similar to Zatch and conjuring a wind spell whenever Eido reads from a similar book aloud, Kiyo does the same by reciting the line Zaker from Zatch's book, making Zatch fire lightning that scares the two away. Despite this, Zatch is acutely incognizant of his own power. From afar, Brago and Sherry Belmont witness the confrontation and declare the beginnings of a Mamodo "battle."
2	2	"A Freezing Spell" / "The Freezing Spell Gikoru VS Zakeru"; Transliteration: "Hyōketsu jumon Gikoru tai Zakeru" (Japanese: 氷結呪文ギコルVSザケル)	April 13, 2003	March 12, 2005
On the way to school, Kiyo and Zatch notice an unruly man, Hosokawa, holding a light blue book with the Mamodo Reycom, who freezes a canal and several motorists in ice. After school, Suzy stumbles upon Hosokawa robbing a bank and is taken at gunpoint. Kiyo sees this event on the news and, at Zatch's insistence, goes to save her. When they arrive at the bank, Kiyo attempts to make Zatch fire lightning by reading Zaker from the book, to no effect. Hosokawa demands that they surrender the book and threatens to kill Suzy. Sensing her distress, Kiyo shouts Zaker, and Zatch fires lightning at Hosokawa and Reycom, dispelling them from the bank. At home, Kiyo postulates that the book, a grimoire, engenders spells based on his emotions, while also noting that Zatch has been growing stronger. He is surprised to find another string of texts on the book now legible: Rashield.
3	3	"The Second Spell!" / "The Second Spell Rashirudo!"; Transliteration: "Daini no jutsu Rashirudo!" (Japanese: 第二の術ラシルド!)	April 20, 2003	March 19, 2005
At school, Kiyo garners an admiration from his classmates following the incident at the bank. On their way home, he and Zatch are ambushed by Hosokawa and Reycom, who seek retribution for the botched robbery. During the ensuing melee, a flashback shows that Hosokawa was an embittered delivery carrier who found Reycom at a warehouse. After losing his job, he discovered the Mamodo's powers and turned to a life of crime. Back in the present, Reycom ices Kiyo's feet to the ground, allowing Hosokawa to take Zatch's spellbook, desiring to use it for himself. To his dismay, he cannot read from the book, so he grabs Zatch and attempts to launch Zaker at Kiyo, but nothing happens. Kiyo concludes that only the rightful bookholder can cast spells. Zatch frees himself and brings the book back to Kiyo who then breaks out of the ice. They are incensed when Reycom states that he takes delight of being a tool for his partner's indiscretions. Kiyo reads out the spell Rashield, which generates a shield that blocks Reycom's icicle attacks. The shield also electrifies and deflects the attacks back at Reycom, setting his spellbook aflame. Reycom makes a futile effort to stop it from burning up before fading seemingly out of existence. Afterwards, Zatch realizes that he was the source of the lightning spells and slips into a depression.
4	4	"The Great Mamodo Battle" / "The Battle of 100 Demons"; Transliteration: "Hyakunin no mamono no tatakai" (Japanese: 100人の魔物の戦い)	April 27, 2003	March 26, 2005
Kiyo spots Zatch trying to boast of his powers in front of several incredulous children. They both get into an argument, and Zatch furiously saunters off by himself. Back home, Kiyo is visited by Sherry and Brago, who explain that Zatch is from the extra-dimensional Mamodo world and among a pool of 100 Mamodo competing in a tournament that recurs every 1,000 years; moreover, when a spellbook is burned, that Mamodo is disqualified and sent back to the Mamodo world, as had happened to Reycom, and that the last one standing becomes king of their world. They then demand Zatch's spellbook, saying that it would only cause trouble, but Kiyo is suspicious of their motives. Meanwhile, Zatch befriends a dog that follows him back to Kiyo's house, where he overhears the conversation from the foyer. A man named Renji confronts him and casts a spell revealing that the dog is actually the Mamodo Gofure.
5	5	"The Dark Mamodo" / "The Black Assassin Brago and Sherry"; Transliteration: "Kuroi shikaku Burago to Sherī" (Japanese: 黒い刺客ブラゴとシェリー)	May 4, 2003	April 2, 2005
Alerted by Zatch's panicked screams, Kiyo rushes to his defense from Renji and Gofure. Zatch is malcontent, proclaiming himself a "monster" and would be better off without Kiyo, who dismisses that notion. Brago and Sherry intercede and burn Gofure's spellbook, removing him from the tournament. They attack Kiyo with gravity-based spells to force him into surrendering Zatch's book. Now acknowledging that he is Zatch's partner, Kiyo gains a new resolve and musters his strength to fight back. The protagonists quell Brago's attacks using Zaker, but Kiyo falls unconscious in the blast. Sherry, however, desists and walks out with a dry smile on her face, to Brago's confusion. Kiyo's mother, Hana Takamine, comes home to find her son wrapped entirely in bandages.
6	6	"The Mystery of the Missing Red Book" / "The Disappearing Red Magic Book"; Transliteration: "Kieta akai mahon" (Japanese: 消えた赤い魔本)	May 11, 2003	April 9, 2005
Kiyo is in the hospital after his ordeal with Sherry and Brago. Next to him in the ward is a dour, young patient named Yuuta, using a wheelchair, who was admitted for a broken leg. When Kiyo excoriates him for not eating his given meals, Yuuta tries getting even by stealing Zatch's book, with the intention of incinerating it. A comedy-filled pursuit ensues throughout the hospital. Zatch finally corners Yuuta, who then absolves himself by claiming to have simply misplaced the book, agreeing to let Zatch help him recover it. Yuuta turns out to have hidden the book atop a rooftop ventilation unit despite his handicap. Kiyo finds them again and apologizes for his temperament. As Yuuta begins climbing down, he trips and falls toward the roof deck, but Kiyo blasts a hole with Zaker that sends him into a linen closet below, saving his life. In the end, Yuuta finishes his food, and Kiyo falls asleep for the evening. A running gag in the episode is that Suzy attempts to greet Kiyo with a get-well gift.
7	7	"Botanical Madness" / "The Battle of the Botanical Gardens"; Transliteration: "Shokubutsuen no kettō" (Japanese: 植物園の決闘)	May 18, 2003	April 16, 2005
As Zatch tries to make more friends at the playground, he is tackled by a playful pony-like Mamodo named Schneider, but this nascent relationship is cut short when a young harrier, Naomi, flings the Mamodo away. Out of boredom, Zatch convinces Kiyo and Suzy to take him to a conservatory. There, they witness the Mamodo Sugino and his human partner Haru attacking visitors with plant-based spells, using them as practicing targets. Kiyo and Zatch manage to set the patrons free by using Zaker on the tree roots binding them. However, when the duo directly confront the opponents, they have run out of energy needed to stage a counterattack, and Sugino wrings Kiyo in a root. He is saved by Ivy Kinoyama, a botanist and docent who knows Kiyo for his frequent sojourns at the arboretum. Taking Haru's cues, Kiyo taps into his inner desire to protect those around him, and the spellbook feeds off this emotion that empowers Zatch to unleash Rashield which deflects Sugino's attack at him, resulting in his elimination. Suzy, who avoided the onslaught without a scratch, meets the protagonists with a gourd in her hand.
8	8	"A Kind Mamodo, Kolulu" / "The Kind Demon Koruru"; Transliteration: "Yasashii mamono Koruru" (Japanese: やさしい魔物コルル)	May 25, 2003	April 23, 2005
A sobbing Mamodo named Kolulu on a rain-slicked sidewalk gets the attention of a teenage girl named Lori, who brings her home believing that she is a street urchin. The two immediately form a close bond. Later on, Kolulu recognizes Zatch, who is unfamiliar with her due to his amnesia. Then, Lori finds Kolulu's spellbook and inquisitively reads the line Zeruk, inadvertently transforming her into an impetuous fiend that causes a vehicle pileup. Horrified, Lori pacifies the Mamodo, who reverts to her normal self as the spell expires. The next day, Lori reads out the spell again to save Kolulu from being run over by a truck. Kiyo and Zatch, who were reconnoitering the scene nearby after watching the news about the incident, witness this and engage them in a battle. Zatch, however, notices Lori and Kolulu shedding tears and takes pity; from this, Lori realizes that they are not a threat and barely stops Kolulu from killing Zatch. Kolulu changes back and, realizing what had happened, tells Ztach that she was obtrusively conditioned to fight in the Mamodo tournament. On Kolulu's request, Kiyo burns her book to remove her from the tournament, while Zatch sorrowfully promises to become a "benevolent king" and prevent what became of her from befalling anyone again.
9	9	"The Third Spell" / "The Third Spell Jikerudo!"; Transliteration: "Daisan no jutsu Jikerudo!" (Japanese: 第三の術ジケルド!)	June 1, 2003	April 30, 2005
The events of the previous episode have unlocked the third spell, Jikerdor. Kiyo and Zatch practice the spell at a secluded section of beach, although nothing extrinsic occurs after multiple tries. They head home unaware that a telepathic Mamodo named Fein and his partner Sebé are tracking them. Fein springs his assault on them, brazenly hurting innocent bystanders as well. Zatch and Kiyo lure their aggressors out of the public's way to an abandoned building to do battle. Fein dodges Zatch's attacks due to a spell allowing him to move from one point to another instantaneously. Seeing no other recourse, Kiyo casts Jikerdor in which Zatch magnetizes Fein's body onto a metal water tank. Unable to free his Mamodo, Sebé gives up, thus sealing Fein's elimination. Thereafter, Kiyo implores Zatch to become stronger in the face of more powerful enemies.
10	10	"The Elite Mamodo" / "The Elite Demon Eshros"; Transliteration: "Eriito mamono Eshurosu" (Japanese: エリート魔物エシュロス)	June 8, 2003	May 14, 2005
Naomi malevolently traps Zatch on a swing set before being told off by a man named Shin Akiyama, who unintentionally scares her with his huge frame. Kiyo also spots the Mamodo Eshros holding a spellbook but initially mistakes Shin for a Mamodo. He and Zatch secretly follow the pair after overhearing them conspiring to destroy the town. Their suspicion is validated when the pair intend to destroy an elementary school, where Shin had been jeered by other students in his youth. The next day, incidentally on a Saturday, the protagonists engage Eshros and Shin on the schoolyard. During the fight, Zatch makes Shin aware that Eshros is manipulating him for his own objective, having found that out by eavesdropping on them, and convinces him that he is not a bad person. This leads to Shin having flashbacks in which his dying mother endears him to be a strong-willed individual. After some reluctance, Shin finally rebels Eshros and surrenders the spellbook to Kiyo, ending the Mamodo's bid for kingship. As a gesture of gratitude, Shin brings Zatch and Kiyo to his mother's crypt.
11	11	"The Invincible Folgore" / "The Invincible Folgore!"; Transliteration: "Muteki Forugore!" (Japanese: 無敵フォルゴレ!)	June 15, 2003	May 21, 2005
The Mamodo Kanchome straps Kiyo to the bedroom ceiling and impersonates him with an illusory spell to trick Zatch into relinquishing his spellbook. When Suzy pays a visit, Kiyo pulls himself loose, breaking Kanchome's cover and making Suzy faint from confusion. Two hours later, Kanchome's partner Parco Folgore, an Italian movie star and songwriter, arrives to take on Zatch, who repeatedly blasts the pair with Zaker. Folgore conjures the spell Poruk that transforms Kanchome into a cannon, but this illusion is revealed to be merely innocuous. However, Kanchome's pertinacity helps him gain the new spell Koporuk, which shrinks him to size. He vexes the protagonists in his miniaturized form, until Kiyo uses Jikerdor to trap him in a skillet with a chocolate bar as bait. Finally annoyed at their mannerisms, Kiyo kicks Folgore and Kanchome out of the house.
12	12	"Sherry's Rhapsody of Life" / "Sherry, the Rhapsody of Fate"; Transliteration: "Sherī Unmei no Rapusodī (Note: The kanji given is "狂詩曲", or "kyōkushikyoku", but is given in furigana as "ラプソデイー", or "rhapsody".)" (Japanese: シェリー運命の狂詩曲)	June 22, 2003	May 28, 2005
Sherry and Brago trudge through the Amazon in the hunt for an opponent. Throughout the journey, Sherry thinks back to her first best friend Koko, who saved her from a suicide attempt. The two grew up in divergent settings: Koko is destitute and often snubbed by others, while Sherry lives a prestigious yet austere lifestyle under her disdainful mother, whose perfectionist viewpoints had induced her into nearly taking her own life. Years later, Koko is matriculated. Elated at the news, Sherry goes to congratulate her but discovers her village on fire. She finds Koko standing wrily by the Mamodo Zofis, who has brainwashed her into burning the town. Savoring her newfound power, Koko warns Sherry to stay out of the way and leaves with Zofis. In the present, Sherry and Brago pin down a Mamodo and its human partner and engage them in a heavy brawl. Interspersed in the scene are more reminiscences of Koko, which bring about a strengthening determination to save her friend that enables them to overpower their opponents. Sherry then faints from a fever, forcing Brago to carry her to the nearest population center.
13	13	"The Rematch: Zatch and Hyde Meet Again" / "Showdown! Gash vs. Hyde"; Transliteration: "Taiketsu! Gasshu tai Haido" (Japanese: 対決! ガッシュ対ハイド)	July 13, 2003	June 4, 2005
Eido exploits Hyde's spells to rob stores and pedestrians across Mochinoki, with the Mamodo growing irate at his indulgences; in his defense, Eido makes plain that Hyde had spurred him into pushing back against his pastime bullies and becoming who he is. Soon, they engage Kiyo and Zatch in a rematch but are forced to retreat when Zatch uses Rashield on them. In hopes of challenging them again, Eido and Hyde detain four of Kiyo's classmates (Suzy, Kane, Yamanaka, and Iwajima) inside a grain silo. Thanks to Zatch finding them by the scent of Eido's yellowtail burger, Kiyo rescues the hostages as Zatch takes hits for him by Hyde. Zatch then bursts an overhead water cistern to hamper the opponents and launches his final attack, but Hyde bodily shields his partner from it, thus unlocking a new spell. Eido casts that spell which collides with Zatch's Rashield, and the two make their escape in the resulting tumult.
14	14	"The Tomboy and the Pop Star" / "The Tomboy Tio and the Idol Megumi"; Transliteration: "Otenba Tio to Aidoru Megumi" (Japanese: おてんばティオとアイドル恵)	July 13, 2003	June 11, 2005
Kiyo and Suzy attend a live concert by pop idol Megumi Oumi. Back stage, Megumi's Mamodo Tia persuades her to perform in spite of Maruss, Tia's erstwhile Mamodo friend who has been stalking them. With the concert underway, Tia has flashbacks in which she meets Maruss on a ferry at the tournament's onset. Maruss, having already found his partner Rembrant, attacks her with a metal-based spell out of hand; she dodges it but falls overboard. In the present, she waits for him at the backdoor vowing payback; to her dismay, she encounters Zatch, who has snuck in after Kiyo left him behind. However, Maruss and Rembrant follow him inside and launch an attack. Zatch manages to hold them off and begs Tia to bring Kiyo for help. Because of her tangle with Maruss, she distrusts Zatch and instead summons Megumi during her intermission. The two combat the enemies with mostly defensive spells, but a trick shot from Maruss knocks Megumi unconscious. With Tia now helpless, Maruss delivers the finishing blow, but Zatch returns with Kiyo and repels the attack, saving the pair from harm.
15	15	"A New Pledge Between Zatch and Tia" / "Gash and Tio's New Promise"; Transliteration: "Gasshu to Tio no aratanaru chikai" (Japanese: ガッシュとティオの新たなる誓い)	July 20, 2003	June 18, 2005
Kiyo urges Megumi and Tia to flee to safety while he and Zatch battle Maruss and Rembrant, driving them out of the building. At the height of the brawl, Maruss castigates Zatch for not treating Tia like a competitor; Zatch in turn accuses him of reneging his friendship with her. Watching from nearby, Tia is astonished by how much Zatch has changed since leaving the Mamodo world. Inspired by his courage, she and Megumi defy Kiyo's advice and aid Zatch into eliminating Maruss. Megumi and Tia then brace for a battle with Zatch and Kiyo, who instead wish them well and prepare to leave. Tia, however, angrily insists that they still fight, but Zatch assures her that she is trustworthy enough to be a "kind" ruler, and the two Mamodo form a pact. Megumi resumes her concert performance with Tia at peace with herself. Meanwhile, as Kiyo rejoins Suzy at his seat, he finds a note that Megumi had slipped in his pocket: it reads that she vows to repay him another time.
16	16	"The Invulnerable Robnos" / "Freezer Confrontation. The Invulnerable Robnos"; Transliteration: "Reitoko taiketsu Fujimi no Robunosu" (Japanese: 冷凍庫対決 不死身のロブノス)	July 27, 2003	June 25, 2005
Kiyo returns from school to find a statue of Suzy in his room along with a letter claiming that she is a hostage. He and Zatch trace the letter to a frozen warehouse and find the Mamodo Robnos and his partner Ruku, both who sent the note and statue. Robnos' laser-based attacks put them at a disadvantage and at one point, he reemerges apparently untouched even after Zatch's attack connects. However, Kiyo figures out Robnos' strategy and uses Jikerdor to discover a duplicate of him. In response, Ruku casts a spell that fuses the duplicates into Robnos' true form, allowing him to easily block subsequent volleys from Zatch. Ruku tells Zatch and Kiyo that he was assaying their moves from the start of the battle and letting the cold ambient air affect them. Nonetheless, Kiyo jabs a metal pipe into Robnos' helmet and channels Zaker through it, causing him to blow out. Out of options, Ruku surrenders the book to Kiyo who sets it alight. As Robnos returns to the Mamodo world, he confesses that he faked the message to draw Zatch out—Suzy was never in danger. He also claims to have seen a Mamodo identical to Zatch in England one week prior, but refuses to say more as he fades out, leaving the protagonists in suspense. The final scene shows a sickened Suzy at her home.
17	17	"Kiyo's Curry Camping Trip" / "Kiyomaro's Curry Summer Vacation"; Transliteration: "Kiyomaro no kare na natsu yasumi" (Japanese: 清麿のカレーな夏休み)	August 3, 2003	July 2, 2005
Summer break has come, and Kiyo plans a trip to England to ascertain Robnos' claim. However, his classmates remind him to fulfill several promises with them: help Yamanaka perfect an implausible invisible pitch, wherein Kiyo sneaks a Zaker spell to forge the effect; catch fish for Iwajima; help Kane hunt for a dinosaur that Zatch masquerades as to placate him; play a round of table tennis with Suzy's friend Marylou; and ineffectually make contact with aliens. For his last promise, Kiyo joins his classmates on a camping trip, with Zatch following them. He is asked to cook curry for the others, leading to a disastrous outcome. Despite the mishaps, Kiyo and Zatch revel the night at the camp, which concludes in a spectacle of fireworks. The next day, the protagonists embark for England, with Schneider stowed aboard their airplane. Megumi and Tia also set out to England for a musical tour, while Suzy finds a lottery ticket that earns her a trip to Hong Kong.
18	18	"London Calling" / "Chase! London's Breast Groping Demon"; Transliteration: "Oe! Rondon no chichi mogema" (Japanese: 追え! ロンドンのチチもげ魔)	August 10, 2003	July 9, 2005
In London, Zatch and Kiyo run into a lone Kanchome who asks for their assistance in finding Folgore, who failed to show at a venue; Kiyo begrudgingly agrees. During the search, the pair finds Megumi and Tia, who ask to pose with them for a photo op, as well as Suzy, who believes herself to be in Hong Kong after getting misdirected. Following Zatch's nose, they visit various shoppes where Folgore had been. They eventually locate him at a hospital, where he had escorted Suzy after she walked into a pole. Learning that Folgore groped her like he did to the female vendors of the shoppes, Kiyo lashes out with Zaker in a fit, but he eludes him. Folgore is revealed to be running an errand: donating gifts he bought to the sick children in the hospital. Kiyo observes this and, seeing Folgore in a more positive light, wishes him and Kanchome the best of luck in the Mamodo tournament before leaving. Later, a young man steals Kiyo's luggage. Note: The episode's Viz Media dub removes all references to groping.
19	19	"The Dark Lord of the Cursed Castle" / "The Evil Flower Blooming Cursed Castle"; Transliteration: "Aku no hanasaku noroi no shiro" (Japanese: 悪の花咲く呪いの城)	August 17, 2003	July 16, 2005
Zatch and Kiyo pursue the thief, Kory, to the city's outskirts. When they catch up, Kiyo redresses a laceration on Kory's arm and takes him to Seitaro's university for medical aid. However, they discover Seitaro's office in disarray, and Kiyo finds evidence that a Mamodo has kidnapped him. Among the clues they find is an orchid which Kory links to a barbarous lord named Steng, who resides in a nearby castle. He tells them that Steng has been abducting and enslaving people from surrounding villages, including his mother and father whom he tried unsuccessfully to rescue, thus incurring the wound. Zatch and Kiyo set out to confront Steng, but Kory is too afraid and stays behind. Hearing of the pair's exploits, Folgore and Kanchome arrive to assist them. Inside the castle, they encounter an array of traps set by Steng, and Folgore and Kanchome fall through a trapdoor. The remaining two reach Steng and his Mamodo Baltro, who is hiding in a giant metal armor. As a battle starts, Kiyo observes Baltro using the orchids to magically control the armor. The situation is further complicated when Steng's ghost knights, hollow armor shells also controlled by Baltro, hold Folgore and Kanchome at swordpoint.
20	20	"The Flowers of Evil" / "The Great Collapse! Baltro's Counterattack"; Transliteration: "Dai hōkai! Barutoro no gyakushuu" (Japanese: 大崩壊! バルトロの逆襲)	August 24, 2003	July 23, 2005
Steng tries to compel Kiyo into surrendering Zatch's spellbook by threatening to kill Folgore and Kanchome. Both Zatch and Kiyo become deadlocked on their next course of action, and Steng seizes that moment to steal the book, rendering them powerless. He affirms that someone instructed him to kidnap Seitaro, with Baltro carrying out the deed, but he denies entering the office, leading Kiyo to suspect that the battle is a setup. Kory, having overcome his fear, nabs Zatch's the spellbook from Steng and gives it to Kiyo after distracting Baltro. Zatch and Kiyo turn the tables and destroy Baltro's armor, exposing the little Mamodo inside, while Folgore and Kanchome also free themselves. Refusing to lose, Steng uses Baltro's spell to make the castle fall on top of Zatch and the others before escaping. As the hostages evacuate, Kiyo reunites with Seitaro before he and Zatch join Kory in searching for his parents in the cellar. They succeed in rescuing the boy's family from the collapsing castle. Elsewhere, Steng and Baltro encounter their employer, a doppelganger of Zatch with his human partner, who fires a beam of blue lightning that eliminates Baltro as punishment for failing him.
21	21	"Another Zatch" / "Another Gash"; Transliteration: "Mō hitori no Gasshu" (Japanese: もうひとりのガッシュ)	August 31, 2003	July 30, 2005
After learning about the ongoing Mamodo tournament from Kiyo, Seitaro directs him to the forest where Zatch was found. Along the way, the boys pass through a village where its inhabitants shirk Zatch in fear, much to Kiyo's confusion. At the edge of the forest, Megumi and Tia tip them about Zatch's resemblance nearby, thus confirming Robnos. Deep in the woods, Zatch accidentally provokes a nest of snakes but is saved by Prof. Dartagnian, Seitaro's eccentric coworker who has been researching the forest on an explosion that occurred there six months ago. Kiyo and Zatch reach the explosion's epicenter, where the latter is suddenly engulfed in an intense golden glow that restores some of his memories. He reveals that the explosion was the result of his lookalike attacking him over something he possesses. The enemy sapped his memories before marooning him in the woods where he dwelled in solitude until Kiyo's father rescued him. The epiphany has also unlocked Zatch's fourth spell: Bao Zakerga.
22	22	"The Dancing Mamodo" / "The Dancing Green Warrior"; Transliteration: "Odoritsuzukeru midori no senshi" (Japanese: 踊りつづける緑の戦士)	September 7, 2003	August 6, 2005
While trying out the fourth spell, Zatch and Kiyo hear rhythmic chanting by the Mamodo Yopopo, along with his partner, an abrasive girl named Djem, who serves the protagonists tea. During the session, she claims that Yopopo's habitual prancing has been attracting Mamodo, particularly Kikuropu and his partner the British Gentleman, both who attacked Djem's family out of pleasure. Fortuitously, Yopopo confronts Kikuropu and British Gentleman, confirming her initial fears, but cannot fight without his partner. Djem saves him and teams up with Kiyo and Zatch to face off their opponents. When the Zatch and Yopopo' attacks prove ineffective, Kiyo attempts to cast Bao Zakerga, but nothing occurs. Yopopo's book is burnt in the midst of the battle, and Kiyo reads out Bao Zakerga with all his emotions, unleashing a huge electrical dragon that overwhelms Kikuropu. Yopopo then ousts him from the tournament, fulfilling his justice for Djem. She tearfully confesses her love for Yopopo as he returns to the Mamodo world.
23	23	"Go for It, Ponygon!" / "Meru-Meru-Me~! Flame on, Umagon"; Transliteration: "Merumerume~! Moeyo Umagon" (Japanese: メルメルメ〜! 燃えよウマゴン)	September 14, 2003	August 13, 2005
Seitaro gives Kiyo a 1,000-year-old stone tablet, which depicts an individual Mamodo and the same glyphs as on the spellbooks, for him to study. Zatch and Kiyo return to Japan. At the airport baggage claim, they encounter Schneider, who had been roaming aimlessly in England. He accompanies them home in Mochinoki but repeatedly bites Kiyo's hand out of anitpathy. Kiyo immediately determines him to be a Mamodo by his own spellbook. Schneider becomes fond of Suzy, Yamanaka and Iwajima, who come for Kiyo's help on homework, as well as Tia, who visits after having just deplaned. Exaserbated, Kiyo snaps and orders Schneider out, but he caves to his friends' demands to bring him back. Kiyo locates Schneider at a busy street displaying his book to a crowd that ignores him, leading him to surmise that he has not yet found his bookowner, with Tia remarking on how lonely he must have been since the start of the Mamodo tournament. Dubbing him "Ponygon", Kiyo agrees to house him until his partner can be found.
24	24	"Apollo, the Free Traveler" / "The Free Traveler Apollo"; Transliteration: "Jiyuu no tabibito Aporo" (Japanese: 自由の旅人アポロ)	September 21, 2003	August 20, 2005
A wayfarer and prospective businessman Apollo Genesis and his ladybug-like Mamodo Rops venture into Mochinoki. Meanwhile, Kiyo tasks himself on fixing damages to his house caused by Zatch and Ponygon's rampant frolicking. During one trip to the hardware store, he witnesses Rops and Apollo saving Suzy when she absent-mindedly crosses into oncoming traffic. Kiyo spots them again entertaining a group of children at the park. Apollo recognizes him as a Mamodo bookholder and invites him for a picnic. At first, Kiyo feigns ignorance in hopes of avoiding a direct conflict, but he finally admits to indeed be Zatch's partner when Apollo and Rops portray themselves as pacifistic. However, when Kiyo asks if they are fine with themselves, Apollo undergoes a sudden change of tone and requests a battle against Zatch; obliging this, Kiyo brings Zatch to engage them. Apollo and Rops gain tempo early in the battle whereby they knock the spellbook out of Kiyo's hand and threaten to burn it. This episode features a brief cameo of Lori, who helps Zatch recall his own inclinations.
25	25	"Apollo, the Free Traveler Part 2" / "The Decisive Battle! The Will to Win"; Transliteration: "Kessen! Shōri e no shuunen" (Japanese: 決戦! 勝利への執念)	September 28, 2003	August 27, 2005
Even though Apollo has dominated the battle, he lets Kiyo fetch Zatch's book but warns that he will not hesitate to burn it next time. Kiyo attempts to cast Bao Zakerga but cannot contrive enough emotions to do so. After hitting Rops with Zaker, Zatch asks him what kind of leader he wishes to be, and he replies by producing a scarf. Seeing this, Apollo reminisces on meeting Rops for the first time in a country separated from the rest of the world. In the flashback, Apollo meets a group of children nursing Rops and asks them for directions to the border, and they lead him to a closed gate on the boundary fence. Rops' spellbook glows brightly to confirm that he is a match with Apollo. Upon recital of a spell, Rops lifts Apollo and himself over the gate, to the exuberance of the kids who gift them with the scarf as a salute to their newfound freedom, a principle that Rops has since embraced. Riding on this memory, Apollo and Rops cast the strongest spell, which Kiyo and Zatch successfully field with Bao Zakerga. The show of attacks, however, leaves each party extremely fatigued, thus they call a truce. That evening, Apollo and Rops continue their travels across the world.
26	26	"A Day with Zatch" / "Gash's One Day"; Transliteration: "Gasshu no ichinichi" (Japanese: ガッシュの一日)	October 5, 2003	September 3, 2005
Zatch goes for a walk around Mochinoki. His solo adventure becomes replete with mishaps, punctuated by Naomi stealing his lunch. That leaves him distraught until he is consoled by a rounded elderly woman named Nana Boba, who is also searching for Hiromi, her son's fiancée. Volunteering to help, Zatch suggests starting at her son's house. Although the residence is vacant, he manages to pick up Hiromi's trail by her scent. Replying to Zatch's enquiry, Nana jokes that she would "beat up" anyone who wore cheap jewelry and a short skirt. They eventually spot Hiromi, who by happenstance is wearing the proverbial outfit. Taking Nana's comment literally, Zatch panics and tries to dissuade her. Unwavered, Nana pursues Hiromi as she boards a transit bus, with Zatch running close behind them. In his ill-fated efforts to stop the meeting, Zatch rams into the bus as it comes to an abrupt halt, sending him unconscious. When he comes to, he is relieved to see Nana bestowing her old wedding ring on Hiromi before gleefully seeing her off, and he heads back to Kiyo's home satisfied about the day.
27	27	"Danny Boy" / "My Son Danny"; Transliteration: "Waga musuko Danii" (Japanese: わが息子ダニー)	October 12, 2003	September 10, 2005
Kiyo and Zatch learn of a priceless, ancient statuette coming to the local museum. The sculpture is transported by a grumpy Mr. Goldo and his incompetent Mamodo Danny. While Goldo completes the delivery, Danny goes out to eat and encounters Zatch. Thinking that he is after the spellbook, Danny starts attacking him, but stops when Zatch states that he simply came to see the statuette. Danny gladly brings him to Goldo, only to discover that a band of thieves had pilfered the sculpture. Zatch use his keen sense of smell to track the thieves to a ship at the harbor and sends Ponygon to warn Kiyo. Danny physically engages the henchmen, bolstered by the spell Jioruk that instantly heals his injuries. The ringleader of the group admonishes Danny to stand down by pointing a pistol on Goldo, but Kiyo intervenes and recovers the package. As the police apprehend the crooks, Goldo and Danny show Kiyo and Zatch the statuette up close as thanks, and the two Mamodo win each other's friendship. However, the sculpture is in danger again when one suspect tries to escape in a big rig, which crashes and sends its cargo tumbling toward it. Danny holds back the cargo as Zatch destroys it, saving the artifact but burning the former's book. As Danny ascends, Goldo uses Jioruk on him one last time and praises him for a job well done.
28	28	"Tia and Megumi's Excellent Adventure" / "Tio and Megumi's Great Adventure"; Transliteration: "Tio to Megumi no dai bōken" (Japanese: ティオと恵の大冒険)	October 19, 2003	September 17, 2005
Megumi and Tia have invited Kiyo and Zatch for a date at an amusement park. After finishing a music video shoot, the girls stop at a clothing boutique where they meet a young princess named Marie. She and Megumi agree to try each other's attire, but Marie exits with Megumi's purse which is carrying Tia's spellbook. The two give chase but are hindered by Marie's protective butler Orem, who misidentifies Megumi. Realizing that Marie has evaded him, Orem explains that she is due to become queen of her kingdom, and that a mercenary is after her. During the subsequent search, the mercenary also mistakes Megumi for the princess and captures her along with Orem. Tia quickly finds Marie and warns her of Megumi's plight. At an alley, Marie risks her own life to turn the mercenary's attention onto herself, a distraction by which Megumi uses Tia's spells to protect the princess and subdue the assailant. Afterwards, Marie thanks Tia for her help and bids her farewell. Now running late, Megumi and Tia continue their way to Kiyo and Zatch.
29	29	"The Amusement Park Battle" / "Fierce Fighting! The Amusement Park Battle"; Transliteration: "Gekitō! Yūenchi batoru" (Japanese: 激闘! 遊園地バトル)	October 26, 2003	September 24, 2005
Zatch and Kiyo await Megumi and Tia at the amusement park. Also in the park are Purio with Lupa, and Zoboron with its stout partner Hige. Enraged that he is too short to enter a ride, Purio has Lupa use his spells to destroy it, but Kiyo and Zatch foil their rampage and lead them to an empty swimming pool away from onlookers. In the ensuing battle, they discover that Purio and Zoboron are a tag team, and are outmatched by Purio's slime attacks and Zoboron's slow-moving energy-sphere spells. In the midst of the skirmish, Kiyo sends a signal into the sky with Zaker, much to the opponents' bewilderment. Zatch becomes paralyzed from Purio's poisonous spell, and Hige unleashes two rounds of Zoboron's most powerful attack that penetrates the protagonists' defense and boxes them in. Megumi and Tia, having observed the signal, arrive and narrowly save the two with Ma Seshield before vowing to fight by their side.
30	30	"Zatch and Tia: A Fierce Combination" / "Gash and Tio: The Strongest Combination"; Transliteration: "Gasshu to Tio Saikyō no konbineshiyon" (Japanese: ガッシュとティオ 最強のコンビネーション)	November 2, 2003	October 1, 2005
As recompense from the first encounter, Megumi and Tia join in Kiyo and Zatch's continued effort against Lupa, Hige, Purio and Zoboron. With Zatch still paralyzed, Tia continually fends off the opponents' attacks. At Kiyo's suggestion, Tia uses Purio's slime as an adhesive to attach Zatch to her back, enabling him to move about and attack while the poison wears off. Zoboron is ultimately eliminated by Zatch and Tia attacking in unison. Regardless, Purio and Lupa gain a new spell and use it to shroud the area in a smoke screen before fleeing. The battle now over, Kiyo, Megumi, Zatch and Tia begin their outing together at the amusement park. At picnic, Kiyo asks Tia about Zatch's time in the Mamodo world; she claims to not know much of his familial life, while Megumi adds that Tia is largely aloof about the past. Tia then shyly tries to give Zatch lunch she made for him but passes it to Kiyo when he notices. Baffled by this, Megumi excuses Kiyo and herself to give the two Mamodo personal space, and Tia finally shares her food with Zatch. The four spend the remainder of the day in the park.
31	31	"The Cute Transfer Student" / "The Cute Transfer Student"; Transliteration: "Makyōhen Kawaii (Note: Written in katana as "カワイイ" which indirectly translates to "cute.") tenkōsei!" (Japanese: 魔鏡編 カワイイ転校生!)	November 9, 2003	October 8, 2005
The episode's prologue shows obscure figures of the Mamodo Grisor and his partner Dr. Hakase, a disgraced scientist, scavanging one of three fragments of a mirror, a relic with immense magical powers, that were dispersed across the world. Diving for yellowtail, Zatch finds another fragment and claims it as a souvenir unaware of its true nature. Heading to school, Suzy informs Kiyo about a transfer student coming to their class; a girl, Shion Hibiki, whose opulent charm cajoles the male students. She has also brought her cat-like Mamodo Nya whom she passes off as her therapy pet, which prompts scolding from the teacher who then recants at the students' urgings. Both Shion and Nya become deeply attracted to Kiyo and Zatch and join them for a walk home, much to the students' disappointment. Soon, Kiyo and Zatch are challenged by Kenji Nomura and his Mamodo Cut N. Paste, both who demand the mirror piece from Zatch. Cut N. Paste deflects the protagonists' attacks with scissor blades which he wields as katana, and Zatch's Rashield is inadequate against his moves. Kenji and Cut N. Paste use the strongest spell which produces a huge missile in the form of a scissor that homes in on the protagonists, but Zatch uses Jikerdor on Cut N. Paste, fooling the missile into striking him instead. Cut N. Paste is thus eliminated. Lurking in the shadows, Hakase and Grisor lament Cut N. Paste's loss yet advance the next phase of their plot. Shion, whom Kiyo sent away for safety, returns to check on her friends and lays eyes on the mirror fragment—her expression darkens as she asks Zatch for it.
32	32	"Shion's Secret" / "Shion's Sad Secret"; Transliteration: "Makyōhen Shion no kanashiki himitsu" (Japanese: 魔鏡編 詞音の悲しき秘密)	November 16, 2003	October 15, 2005
After Zatch averts her from the fragment, Shion and Nya resolve to steal it from him by any means necessary. After many failed endeavors, Shion decides to force Zatch into combat to reclaim the shard. She entices him to a wooded area (by chance, Kiyo becomes bashful of her and runs off), and Zatch is shocked that Nya is actually a Mamodo. For her first move, Shion casts a spell that synchronizes Zatch's body movements with Nya, who flits at a butterfly. This gives her the opportunity to take the fragment, but the spell quickly subsides before she could grab it. Shion then uses heavier attacks on him to shake off the object, but Kiyo arrives and saves him from her wrath. As the battle escalates, Shion insists that the shard is vital for Nya to keep her company after losing her parents six months ago. She shares a rumor that if all three mirror shards are put together, Nya can bypass the Mamodo tournament's rules and stay with her for all time. Fascinated by this, Kiyo and Zatch cease fighting and willingly give her the fragment. In exchange, Shion agrees to take them to the person who purported the rumor.
33	33	"The Joining of the Three" / "When Three Pieces Reunite"; Transliteration: "Makyōhen Mitsu no kakera ga sorou toki" (Japanese: 魔鏡編 三つのかけらがそろう時)	November 23, 2003	October 29, 2005
Kiyo, Zatch, Shion and Nya head to the unkempt apartment complex of Hakase, who sent Shion after the mirror shard based on its alleged purpose, and meet Grisor. After wowing the group with a plethora of Hakase's scientific contraptions to earn their trust, Grisor seems to confirm that the mirror's special properties grant any Mamodo the ability to withdraw from the tournament, adding that the shards must be collected at a mystical temple nearby. Grisor leads the group there while furtively in contact with Hakase, who is euphoric at the prospect of getting revenge on the institute that expelled him for unknown reasons. In the temple where the third shard is already present, Grisor asks Kiyo, Zatch, and Shion to perform a dancing ritual, ironically involving Folgore's signature song, before merging the three pieces into one whole mirror. At that moment, Grisor takes the relic and makes his escape. To help his Mamodo gain distance, Hakase remotely detonates the temple on top of the protagonists, who emerge unscathed because the construct was made of styrofoam. Now realizing that Grisor has deceived them, Kiyo, Shion and their Mamodo give chase.
34	34	"Sunset Soaked in Tears" / "Tears Bathed in the Sunset"; Transliteration: "Makyōhen Yūhi ni somatta namida" (Japanese: 魔鏡編 夕陽に染まった涙)	November 30, 2003	November 5, 2005
The protagonists' pursuit for the mirror is encumbered by an array of traps that Hakase had set. Although they manage to elude each one, the delays buy Grisor enough time to rendezvous with his partner and give him the relic. Hakase activates the mirror that boosts Grisor's spell powers one hundred fold, causing him to grow into a monstrous form and making him impervious to the protagonists' counterattacks. Grisor aims a spell at Shion, but Nya pushes her out of harm's way and gets his book burnt. She mournfully holds Nya in her arms as he disappears into the Mamodo world. Hakase casts a spell that inundates the surrounding area with molten magma, trapping the three.
35	35	"The Final Mirror Battle" / "The Burning Final Battle"; Transliteration: "Makyōhen Shakunetsu no saishū kessen" (Japanese: 魔鏡編 灼熱の最終決戦)	December 7, 2003	November 12, 2005
As Kiyo and Zatch continue the intensive battle, Hakase tells them that Grisor smuggled the mirror from the Mamodo world, but it unexpectedly split into three on his transition to Earth, so they enlisted several Mamodo and human pairs, Cut N. Paste among them, to procure the shards in furtherance of their selfish goals, while also fabricating the story about the mirror to lull them into their servitude. Grisor's next attack incapacitates Zatch, leaving Kiyo vulnerable. Seeing that she was a pawn in Hakase's artifice, Shion tackles the mad scientist, making him drop the mirror and cracking it. Consequently, Grisor loses most of his strength. Zatch regains consciousness and sends out Bao Zakerga to eliminate him, laying to waste the mirror as well. The next day, Kiyo learns that Shion is transferring out of his school. Prior to going their separate ways, Shion explains to him that she aspires to be a more courageous and independent person.
36	36	"Collision: Zatch vs. Naomi" / "Clash! Gash VS Naomi"; Transliteration: "Gekitotsu! Gasshu tai Naomi-chan" (Japanese: 激突! ガッシュVSナオミちゃん)	December 14, 2003	November 26, 2005
Zatch has a nightmare about Naomi. The next morning, he seeks remediation by challenging her to a competition that would make her stop bullying him should she lose. However, Naomi prevails every step of the way, and Zatch is thrown into a deep sand pit. He is helped out by a child who warns that Naomi has become stranded on a cliff. Zatch arrives and sees a lion, which had escaped from a nearby zoo, looming over her. He begins scaling the cliff to extricate Naomi but gets caught on a tree branch. Seeing him in peril, Naomi climbs up the rockface and saves Zatch from the lion. Shortly after, animal wranglers capture the lion, and Zatch begins noticing parallels between his dream and the day's occurrences.
37	37	"Battle in Hong Kong" / "Unstoppable Love! The Pure Love of a Hong Kong Girl"; Transliteration: "Ai wo tsuranuke! Honkon junai musume" (Japanese: 愛をつらぬけ! 香港純愛娘)	December 21, 2003	December 3, 2005
In China, Li‑en ardently protests her father, triad leader Li‑akron, in his decision to ship off the Mamodo Wonrei, with whom she is in love. As punishment, Li‑akron sends his daughter to Japan and places her under the surveillance of his subordinates. Hours later, Li‑en encounters Zatch and Kiyo, who are going to the movies with Suzy, and snatches their spellbook to gain their attention. She succeeds in recruiting the pair in her quest to reunite with Wonrei, who is imprisoned on a remote island outside Hong Kong. As the island is controlled by Li‑akron, his henchmen intercept her at the airport, but Kiyo and Zatch help her ward them off. The three arrive on the island and overpower the guards who try to apprehend them. They ride an elevator to the island's summit where Wonrei is held, while the Mamodo Zabas and his partner Galliont await them at the top.
38	38	"Battle in Hong Kong Part 2" / "The Iron Fist of Love! Gou Bauren"; Transliteration: "Koi no tekken! Gou Bauren" (Japanese: 恋の鉄拳! ゴウ·バウレン)	December 28, 2003	December 10, 2005
Zabas confronts the threesome and is eager to kill Wonrei inside his dungeon cell. Kiyo and Zatch distract Zabas as Li‑en tries to release Wonrei, who expresses no qualms about being confined for the fear that she would be hurt in the Mamodo tournament. When Zabas turn his focus onto Li‑en, Wonrei breaks himself out and repels him. Asked by Zatch, Wonrei reveals his desire to be a king that protects all around him. Moved by this, Zatch gains the fifth spell Zakerga, a more concentrated variant of Zaker. Refusing to back down, Zabas impedes Li‑en and Wonrei's escape, but Zatch launches his new spell on the opponent, ousting him from the tournament. Li‑akron has a change of heart and gives Wonrei and Li‑en his blessing, arranging a boat ride off the island for everyone.
39	39	"The Invisible Hunter" / "Desperate situation! The Hunter without Appearance"; Transliteration: "Zettai zetsumei! Sugata naki hantaa (Note: The kanji given is "狩人", or "karyūdo", but the furigana is given as "ハンター", or "hunter".)" (Japanese: 絶体絶命! 姿なき狩人)	January 11, 2004	December 17, 2005
Zatch plays a raffle for yellowtail fish but loses. A witty hunter named Garza sympathizes with him by handing over his tickets to an onsen. Zatch invites Kiyo along with Suzy and Hana to the onsen. There, Kiyo finds a note in his cabin showing the location of a secret spring with an all-you-can-eat yellowtail venue, which excites Zatch. Upon arriving at the given location, Kiyo realizes too late that it is a trap, and they are attacked by a leopard-like Mamodo Baransha and Garza, her human partner whose generosity to Zatch turned out to be a ruse. The protagonists are in an unfavorable position since Baransha's spells make her invisible and able to attack from a distance. Low on energy, Kiyo manages to bait the opponents into the open and pelts Baransha with ginkgo nuts. The odor from the nuts helps Zatch track down Baransha even when she is invisible. Having reversed their fortune, the protagonists attack with Bao Zakerga, but Garza and Baransha escape by jumping into a rapid that sweeps them away.
40	40	"Big Brother Kanchome" / "Kanchomé Becomes an Elder Brother"; Transliteration: "Kyanchome, niichan ni naru" (Japanese: キャンチョメ, 兄ちゃんになる)	January 18, 2004	January 7, 2006
While awaiting Folgore for an autograph session, Kanchome is drawn to the sight of a basket full of candy in the back of a truck. The vehicle departs with him inside it. He ends up at a circus run by ringmaster Mr. Dancho, who was enthused over the Mamodo's duckling appearance and arranged his transport to be recruited for the circus. Kanchome's bumbling performances make him a hit, but he misses Folgore and decides to quit, to Dancho's tentative attestment. Not long after, he meets a young orphaned girl named Rushka, who resides on a farm with a flock of sheep which she considers closest to family other than her surrogate caretaker Lily. Kanchome offers to be her "big brother". Soon, a dimwitted, fire-breathing dragon-like Mamodo named Bago and his partner Fredo steal every sheep on the pasture. Kanchome follows the pair in an effort to save the flock and is joined by Folgore. The two find Bago and Fredo holed up inside a cavern with Rushka watching from outside.
41	41	"Invincible Kanchome" / "Great Reversal! Invisible Kanchomé"; Transliteration: "Dai gyakuten! Muteki Kyanchome" (Japanese: 大逆転! 無敵キャンチョメ)	January 25, 2004	January 14, 2006
Unable to overcome their opponents, Folgore and Kanchome retreat. Rushka tries taking the matter into her own hands, but Fredo kicks her aside. Her braveness helps Kanchome gain a renewed will to fight, which results in a new spell appearing on his book. Folgore recites the spell Diga Poruk, which makes Kanchome seemingly enlarge to 100 times his normal size. Bago launches a frenzy of counterattacks, but the spells pass harmlessly through Kanchome, leading Folgore to discover that he is actually a holographic caricature of the real Kanchome. With the enemies flustered, Folgore manages to grab Bago's spellbook and throw it into the flames created by the Mamodo's breath, thereby eliminating him. Rushka is reunited with the sheep on her farmland, and Kanchome bids her and Dancho his last goodbye. At a nearby dock, Kanchome is drawn to candy on a ship and gets trapped on board, repeating the events from before, and Folgore scurries after him. The ship sets sail for Antarctica.
42	42	"Coldhearted Foes" / "The Ruthless Enemies: Zeon and Dufaux"; Transliteration: "Hijō naru teki Zeon to Dyufō" (Japanese: 非情なる敵 ゼオンとデュフォー)	February 1, 2004	January 21, 2006
Zatch accompanies Kiyo to school in spite of being stricken with a fever. Friction abounds between the two over that decision and during the argument, Zatch passes out due to complications from the fever and is admitted to the school nurse. Kiyo is then visited by Apollo, who informs him that he has become CEO of his father's company after Rops had returned to the Mamodo world. A backstory shows that Apollo and Rops were confronted by the Zatch lookalike in Holland. The enemy and his partner were able to outsmart them move for move, making Apollo suspect that the human partner can somehow foresee his actions. Ultimately, the Mamodo eliminated Rops without penitence. Apollo concludes with Zeno being the lookalike's name, and Kiyo makes a vow to defeat Zeno and his partner in Rops' honor. Zatch is startled awake after enduring a premonition of Zeno and returns to Kiyo, who obliquely regards it as a fever dream but tells him to maintain his push through the tournament.
43	43	"Praying Mantis Joe: The Hero of Justice" / "The Hero of Justice Kamakiri Joe"; Transliteration: "Seigi no Hiirō Kamakiri Jiō" (Japanese: 正義のヒーロー カマキリジョー)	February 8, 2004	January 28, 2006
On a whim, Zatch and Ponygon travel to the mall to visit a mascot named Praying Mantis Joe, a humanized praying mantis and star superhero character on Zatch's favorite TV show, in defiance of Kiyo who flatly refuses to take them. Shopping at the mall are Suzy and Sabae Nakata, wife of Kiyo's school instructor, who also discover that discounted items they purchased are fake. Noticing the counterfeit products being sold, Zatch decides to stand up for the customers and asks Praying Mantis Joe to intervene. The costumed actor, Yabuki, responds that he cannot do anything about it, so Zatch rallies a group of kids to report the conundrum to the store manager. However, the manager calls a mall cop on the kids to protect himself from them. Yabuki confronts the cop on behalf of the kids, resulting in an altercation that ends with Sabae hurling the mascot actor onto the agent. The manager is soon forced to bring the real merchandise to the customers, implying that he perpetrated the sale of the fraudulant merchandise, and Yabuki's alter ego is hailed as a hero.
44	44	"Invitation to a Duel" / "A Challenge from Bari"; Transliteration: "Barī kara no chōsenjō" (Japanese: バリーからの挑戦状)	February 15, 2004	February 4, 2006
The episode opens with a stern Mamodo named Vincent Bari and his Finnish partner Gustav eliminating another Mamodo. Bari expresses dissatisfaction about his battles so far and decides to go to Japan in hopes of finding a worthier foe. In his successive spree against other opponents, he learns about Zatch whom he demands to do battle at a factory. Three hours after Zatch accepts the challenge, he and Kiyo arrive there and find workers still in the establishment as Bari unleashes his foray. Zatch manages to evacuate the civilians, while Kiyo preoccupies the opponents and is nearly killed by Bari before Zatch saves him at the last moment. Now devoid of distractions, the battle goes into full swing.
45	45	"Zatch vs. Bari" / "Endless Death Battle: Gash VS Bari"; Transliteration: "Hate nakishitō Gasshu tai Barī" (Japanese: 果てなき死闘 ガッシュVSバリー)	February 22, 2004	February 11, 2006
Kiyo and Zatch are overpowered by Bari's vortex-based spells, which also counteract Bao Zakerga. The protagonists' incantation of that spell has rendered them unable to use other spells, so Zatch fights Bari hand to hand. At one point, Bari hesitates when he looks into Zatch's eyes and gets knocked down (this similarly happened with Kiyo in the previous episode). Zatch moves Kiyo to a safer place to help him recover his strength. As the combat heats up, Kiyo attempts to help Zatch by crashing a loader into the support column, collapsing the ceiling onto the opponents. In retaliation, Bari lunges but restrains himself upon noticing Kiyo looking into Zatch's eyes, to his intrigue. When asked by Gustav, Zatch reiterates his ambition to be a kind king, but Bari ridicules this and declares himself an archetype of pure power and strength best fit for the throne, contrasting with Zatch's ideals. He and Gustav leave without further contest.
46	46	"Ponygon's Close Call" / "Meru-Meru-Me~! Umagon Close Call!?"; Transliteration: "Merumerume~! Umagon kikīpatsu" (Japanese: メルメルメ〜! ウマゴン危機一髪!?)	February 29, 2004	February 18, 2006
The adversity with Bari and Gustav has left both Kiyo and Zatch extremely traumatized. Ponygon goes on a resumed search for his bookowner. He meets a wanted man named Kotaro Doronma and assumes him to be his bookowner because of his horse-like face. Following Ponygon's scent, Zatch catches up and is invited along with Ponygon to Doronma's residence, where he asks the two Mamodo to aid in his plan to steal from the rich and give to the poor; they both agree, completely oblivious to his actual M.O. After burgling multiple jewellery stores, Doronma sets his sights on a valuable diamond in a silver spoon mansion. In the middle of the break-in, the Mamodo clumsily trip the alarm system, serendipitously thwarting Doronma's attempted caper. As he is arrested by the police, Doronma clarifies that he is not Ponygon's bookowner, explaining that he only saw a fly on the spellbook, much to Ponygon's irritation.
47	47	"Rumble in the Snow" / "Snowfield Rumble!! The King's Style"; Transliteration: "Setsugen meidō!! Ōja no fūkaku" (Japanese: 雪原鳴動!! 王者の風格)	March 7, 2004	February 25, 2006
Sherry and Brago are riding through the highlands on snowmobiles when they come across an injured old man and his grandson Jeff, who are under attack by a belligerent wild bear. Sherry and Brago use a spell to scare it off before bringing the man back to the refuge of his house. He explains that they are hunting the bear down after it killed Jeff's parents. Brago leaves to wander around the mountainside after having a falling out with Sherry over Jeff. He kills the bear and carries the carcass back to the house, imploring Jeff to be a stronger person. From this, Sherry notes Brago's ever-softening stance on others. The next day, a group of loggers threatens to raze the family's house. Brago holds off the men, but they detonate explosives hidden on the mountain slopes and trigger an avalanche to bury them. Brago gains the new spell Dioga Gravidon which he uses to stop the avalanche, once more saving the family.
48	48	"The Mystery of the Stone Tablets" / "The Shinobi by Evil! The Mystery of the Lithographs"; Transliteration: "Shinobi yoru jaaku! Sekiban no nazo" (Japanese: 忍びよる邪悪! 石版の謎)	March 14, 2004	March 4, 2006
While shopping with Suzy at a street market, Kiyo stumbles upon a stone tablet similar to one that he obtained from Seitaro earlier in the season. He purchases it from the vendor to bring home, then ships it to Seitaro for scientific analyses. Meanwhile, Zatch, Tia, and Ponygon train themselves for tougher battles ahead. A quirky but insightful illusionist Dr. Riddles and his marionette-like Mamodo Kido are on an airplane bound for Japan to meet Zatch and Tia. At night, a Mamodo takes the tablet from Kiyo's bedroom in the cover of dark; at the same time, the tablet in Seitaro's possession is also stolen. Toward the end of the episode, a masked Mamodo admirably surveys a vast collection of stone tablets.
49	49	"Dr. Riddles and the Majestic Twelve" / "Dr. Nazonazo and the Majestic Twelve"; Transliteration: "Nazonazo Hakase to Majosutikku Tōeribu (Note: The kanji is given as "12人の刺客", which roughly translates to "Twelve Assassins". The furigana reads "マジョスティックトエリブ", or "Majestic Twelve".)" (Japanese: ナゾナゾ博士と12人の刺客)	March 21, 2004	March 11, 2006
Dr. Riddles and Kido challenge Kiyo and Zatch to a battle. At random, however, Riddles first brings forth the Majestic Twelve, a ragtag league of 12 inept American superheroes each with distinct superpowers, and asks the protagonists to guess the "odd man out"; Kiyo correctly picks Lady Susan (Note: Known as Big Boing (ビッグ・ボイン, Biggu Boin) in the Japanese release.) as she is the only female member of the group. Following a brief respite, Riddles returns and sends Kido to fight Zatch, promising to share a secret about the Mamodo's spellbooks should the latter prevail. The protagonists are at an immediate disadvantage against Kido's machinery-based attacks. Indirectly clued by Riddles, Kiyo comes to realize that the spells in the books are in fact written manifestations of powers for the individual Mamodo. He tells Zatch to believe in the power inside himself, which opens up a sixth spell in the spellbook.
50	50	"The Sixth Spell" / "Activate! The Sixth Spell Rauzaruku!!"; Transliteration: "Hatsudō! Dairoku no jutsu Rauzaruku!!" (Japanese: 発動! 第六の術ラウザルク!!)	March 28, 2004	March 11, 2006
Kiyo calls out the new spell Rauzaruk, which imbues Zatch in an iridescent aura but to the effects unknown at first. Because the spell is temporary, the protagonists are unable to figure out what it actually does before the aura disappears. The two then become overrun by a throng of Kido's self-produced minuscule clones. Kiyo posits that the power that Zatch had wished for earlier must be an essential component for the spell and casts it again. Zatch is able to bat off Kido's clones, and states that he wanted such power to protect Kiyo, who deduces that Rauzaruk greatly increases strength, agility, and endurance so long as the effect holds. With these enhancements, Zatch finally culminates the battle by hurtling Kido aloft. Making good on his promise, Riddles explains that the latent powers within the Mamodo awaken as they mature spiritually or when their bookowner's feelings are mutualized. Riddles also concedes that he unsuccessfully attempted to secure the stone tablets before their thievery, and immediately conscripts the duo for a fight against a villainous Mamodo who he admonishes is raising an armada.
