= Zatch Bell! Movie 2: Attack of Mechavulcan =

Japanese film by Takuya Igarashi

Zatch Bell: Attack of Mechavulcan
- Directed by: Takuya Igarashi
- Screenplay by: Aya Matsui
- Based on: Zatch Bell! by Makoto Raiku
- Produced by: Hiromi Seki; Kazuyoshi Seki; Masakazu Kubo
- Starring: Shigeru Chiba; Ikue Ohtani; Takahiro Sakurai
- Edited by: Shigeru Nishiyama
- Music by: Kow Otani
- Production company: Toei Animation
- Distributed by: Toei Company, Ltd.
- Release date: August 6, 2005 (Japan)
- Running time: 85 minutes
- Country: Japan
- Language: Japanese

Zatch Bell: Attack of Mechavulcan (Japanese: 金色のガッシュベル「メカバルカンの来襲, Hepburn: Konjiki no Gash Bell!! Mechavulcan no Raishuu) is a 2005 Japanese animated film directed by Takuya Igarashi. It is the second animated film adaptation of the manga and anime series, Zatch Bell!. The first was Zatch Bell: 101st Devil, released in 2004.

Discotek Media released both movies on Blu-ray and DVD for the first time in North America on March 27, 2018.

== Plot ==
The film begins with a mysterious figure, Dr. M2, rallying a group of robots that he calls Death Mechanics (which all look like gigantic robotic blue versions of Vulcan, a plastic box with wooden sticks for arms that Kiyomaro Takamine "gifted" to Gash). He orders one of the units, Death 18, to kidnap Kiyomaro.

Meanwhile, Kiyomaro is rushing to get to the bus for Coast School, since he slept in late. He leaves Gash behind, who chases after Kiyomaro. During the chase, Vulcan, who Gash brought along with him, is partially broken. Stuck in a tree and unable to stop Kiyomaro, Gash asks him if he'll at least fix Vulcan, but Kiyomaro says that he'll "make him a new one". As Kiyomaro tries to chase the already-moving bus down, his friends spot him and try to tell the others to stop the bus. However, while they're not paying attention, Death 18 swoops down from the sky and abducts Kiyomaro, carrying him away and leaving his friends baffled. Once Kiyomaro arrives at Dr. M2's lab, he is contained inside an orange bubble. Dr. M2 then orders Death 18 to go down and distract Gash to keep him away from Kiyomaro by making Gash think that he's his friend.

As Gash walks home, he thinks about the previous versions, or "generations", of Vulcan that had been ruined in the past (leading up to the third that he currently had), and how they are all important friends of his. Screaming out that Kiyomaro's an idiot, Naomi, the local bully, believes that Gash was talking about her, so she starts pummeling him. However, Death 18 comes down from the sky and interrupts her. As he's about to harm Naomi, Gash realizes that he looks just like Vulcan, and tells him not to hurt Naomi. Naomi runs off and Death 18 fixes Gash's Vulcan. Gash thinks that Death 18 is another Vulcan that Kiyomaro built, and calls him "Yondaime", or "Fourth Generation". Gash and Vulcan then ride in Yondaime's giant mouth into town.

In Dr. M2's lab, the demon explains that Kiyomaro kun is to be his new partner, and that he can take Kiyomaro to the future demon world. Dr. M2 shows Kiyomaro the Death Mechanics, but Kiyomaro tells him that they're just rip-offs of Vulcan. To prove him wrong, Dr. M2 shows Kiyomaro a robotic model of Vulcan from the future that Kiyomaro will someday build; however, as a prototype, it's loaded up with bugs. Dr. M2 had realized that the best way to fix the Death Mechanics was to have Kiyomaro repair them. Kiyomaro asks Dr. M2 whether the battle to decide the next ruler of the Demon World is still going on, but Dr. M2 simply states that he isn't interested in that battle, leaving it vague. Dr. M2 offers again to bring Kiyomaro to the future, but he refuses. Dr. M2 tells him that the idiots of his time can't understand him, but Kiyomaro says that Gash changed his view of people around him.

Meanwhile, after venturing into town, Gash and Yondaime go under a bridge and find graffiti. As the two start painting the walls themselves, Gash paints "Yondaime" in Kanji onto the robot's body. Gash's demon friends, Tio, Kanchome, and Umagon, then arrive under the bridge. While Kanchome is terrified by Yondaime, Gash explains that he is a present from Kiyomaro, so the five of them then play together in the park. As Dr. M2 opens the portal to the future to return with Kiyomaro, a dark cloud is created over the city. Citizens of Mochinoki Town are advised to leave, and there is mass panic. Gash says that they should all go to investigate, but Yondaime's programming makes him try to keep them all away. After much prodding from Gash, though, Yondaime realizes that he and Gash have become friends, and he changes his mind. The four demons get into Yondaime's mouth and, revealing that he can fly, Yondaime soars towards the cloud.

Upon entering the dark cloud, they discover Dr. M2's giant floating castle. Infuriated that Death 18 disobeyed his orders, Dr. M2 tries to reprimand him, but the robot doesn't respond. Kiyomaro manages to break free from his prison and communicates with Gash using a giant monitor on the side of the castle. Dr. M2 summons all of the Death Mechanics to fight off Gash and the others, but Kiyomaro manages to get Gash to fire his Zakeru spell, blasting away the Death Mechanics' missiles. The attack also tears a hole in a part of the castle, though, leaving Kiyomaro to fall from the sky; however, Yondaime manages to catch him.

Kiyomaro gets ready to attack the army of Vulcans, but Gash, believing them all to be Vulcans and, therefore, all his friends, runs towards them to try to talk to them, while Yondaime keeps Kiyomaro restrained. The Vulcans don't respond to Gash's words, though, and all begin to pummel him. Tio, Kanchome, Umagon, and Yondaime all try to hold back the Vulcans from attacking him, but to no avail. As all of the Vulcans try to take Kiyomaro, Gash yells at them to stop. They all stop momentarily, but are immediately called back to the castle by Dr. M2. One of Dr. M2's lightning bolts hits Yondaime, reverting him to his original programming. Despite Gash's efforts, Yondaime flies off to join the others, who all fuse together with the castle to become one giant Vulcan.

As the giant Vulcan attacks the group, Megumi, Folgore, and Sunbeam all arrive in a car together to help fight it off. During the scuffle, Megumi casts Giga Ra Seushiru, causing the giant Vulcan's attack to reflect back at it, making it collapse. Gash asks again if they can stop attacking, saying that since they're all Vulcans, they're all his friends. Kiyomaro angrily snatches Gash's Vulcan from his hand, saying that it's just a toy made from chopsticks and a paper box that he scrapped together. Gash tearfully reminds Kiyomaro that Vulcan was the first friend that Kiyomaro ever made for him. Shaken by Gash's statement, Kiyomaro says that the only reason he wanted to go to Coast School was because his friends would be there. Kiyomaro had been alone, thinking that the world was boring and stupid, until Gash had come along and taught him the importance of friends. Kiyomaro comes to tears as he says that, although Gash made many friends for Kiyomaro, the only friend that he could give Gash was a toy made of paper box and chopsticks, yet Gash still cherishes it so much. Everyone agrees that, because Vulcan is Gash's friend, he is their friend as well, and will help protect all of the Vulcans. With newfound understanding and determination, Kiyomaro comes up with a plan to stop the Vulcans without destroying them.

The four demon and human pairs coordinate attacks and trick Dr. M2 into opening the power reactor on the front of the enormous Vulcan to attack; however, before he can, Gash and Kiyomaro jump in the way and fire Zakeruga at the reactor, destroying it. When the giant Vulcan collapses, Gash sees that Yondaime is all right, and he hugs him.

Suddenly, the storm around them intensifies, and everyone realizes that if they don't seal the time-space hole, then the entire Earth will be destroyed. Kiyomaro grabs Dr. M2, asking him to fix it. Dr. M2 reveals that if the destroyed reactor is fixed, the hole will close, but there would need to be a large amount of power to reactive it. Gash states that they could provide the power to activate the reactor, and Dr. M2 realizes that everyone's combined power could repair it.

As Dr. M2 floats in the sky in the core of his castle, the four demons cast a series of spells to channel power into the reactor, ending with Kiyomaro casting Gash's most powerful spell, Baou Zakeruga, to guide it. However, their efforts are unsuccessful, and the temporarily closed gate opens once more. Yondaime then flies up, attaching himself to the reactor. Dr. M2 realizes that Gash could strike the reactor still active in Yondaime to get the main reactor working again, but Gash says that he could never shoot Yondaime. As Gash cries, Yondaime begins talking to him; however, the one sending the message through Yondaime it is in fact the Vulcan prototype, which is revealed to contain Kiyomaro's recorded voice. He says that they will always be friends, whether they are together or apart; he speaks not only as Yondaime, but also as the future Kiyomaro who no longer has Gash with him. Redetermined, Gash and Kiyomaro launch a gigantic Baou Zakeruga, which crashes through Yondaime and splits into three heads, starting up the reactor. As Dr. M2 sits in the castle, holding the prototype Vulcan in his lap, he quietly wonders to himself if the transmission element that Gash and Kiyomaro used to guide the reactor can guide even himself. The three Baou Zakerugas fly into the cloud, successfully closing the hole and leaving Dr. M2's fate unknown. The giant Vulcan then separates back into the smaller Vulcans, who fly away into the sky. Gash asks Kiyomaro if he can ever see Yondaime again, but Kiyomaro responds that he'll build him an even better Vulcan; an even better friend.

== Voice cast ==
- Shigeru Chiba as Dr. M2
- Ikue Ohtani as Gash Bell
- Takahiro Sakurai as Kiyomaro Takamine
- Ai Maeda as Megumi Ooumi
- Hiroki Takahashi as Parco Folgore
- Masami Kikuchi as Kyanchome
- Rie Kugimiya as Tio
- Hozumi Goda as Kafka Sunbeam
- Kazunari Tanaka as Hiroshi Yamanaka
- Masaaki Tsukada as Principal
- Satomi Koorogi as Umagon
- Tomoko Akiya as Suzume Mizuno
- Wakana Yamazaki as Hana Takamine (Kiyomaro's Mother)
- Wataru Takagi as Kaneyama
- Ayaka Saito as 4th generation Vulcan
- Issei Tanaka as Nakayama
- Mari Adachi as Mommon Sensei
- Shihomi Mizowaki as Naomi

== Theme Songs ==
1. Kaze wo Ukete by Aya Ueto
2. Kasabuta by Chiwata Hidenori
3. Mienai Tsubasa" by Takeyoshi Tanimoto
