= List of Zatch Bell! video games =

Zatch Bell!
- Developer(s): Eighting; Bandai; Banpresto
- Publisher(s): Bandai
- Platform(s): Game Boy Advance, GameCube, PlayStation 2
- First release: Konjiki no Gash Bell!! Unare! Yūjō no Zakeru; December 12, 2003
- Latest release: Konjiki no Gash Bell!! Go! Go! Mamono Fight!! December 15, 2005

The Zatch Bell! anime/manga series had video games, most of which were published in Japan only. Ten Zatch Bell! video games were only published in Japan with half of them being Game Boy Advance titles but three games were localized in North America including Zatch Bell! Mamodo Battles, Zatch Bell! Electric Arena, and Zatch Bell! Mamodo Fury. Konjiki no Gash Bell!! Unare! Yūjō no Zakeru 2 was planned to be localized in North America as Zatch Bell! Electric Arena 2 but it was canceled for unknown reasons.

Unfortunately, even though the Zatch! Bell anime franchise is very popular worldwide, the vast majority of Japanese video games based on this series are never officially released outside of Asia.

== Game Boy Advance games ==
Title	Details
Konjiki no Gash Bell!! Unare! Yūjō no Zakeru Original release date(s): JP: December 12, 2003; NA: November 11, 2005	Release years by system: 2003 – Game Boy Advance
Konjiki no Gash Bell!! Unare! Yūjō no Zakeru Original release date(s): JP: December 12, 2003; NA: November 11, 2005	Notes: 2D fighting game developed by Eighting and published by Banpresto in Japan and published by Bandai in North America.; Known as Zatch Bell! Electric Arena in North America.; 金色のガッシュベル!! うなれ！友情のザケル (Konjiki no Gasshu Beru!! Unare! Yūjō no Zakeru), inscribed as 金色のガッシュベル!! うなれ！友情の電撃 (Konjiki no Gasshu Beru!! Unare! Yūjō no Dengeki), translates to "Konjiki no Gash Bell!! Wish! Zakeru of Friendship" and "Konjiki no Gash Bell!! Wish! Electric Shock of Friendship" from Japanese respectively.
Konjiki no Gash Bell!! Makai no Bookmark Original release date(s): JP: July 16, 2004	Release years by system: 2004 – Game Boy Advance
Konjiki no Gash Bell!! Makai no Bookmark Original release date(s): JP: July 16, 2004	Notes: Action role-playing game developed and published by Banpresto in Japan.; 金色のガッシュベル!! 魔界のブックマーク (Konjiki no Gasshu Beru!! Makai no Bukkumāku) translates to "Konjiki no Gash Bell!! Bookmark of Demon World" from Japanese.
Konjiki no Gash Bell!! Unare! Yūjō no Zakeru 2 Original release date(s): JP: December 12, 2004; NA: Canceled	Release years by system: 2004 – Game Boy Advance
Konjiki no Gash Bell!! Unare! Yūjō no Zakeru 2 Original release date(s): JP: December 12, 2004; NA: Canceled	Notes: 2D fighting game published by Bandai; Was entitled Zatch Bell! Electric Arena 2 in North America before cancellation.; 金色のガッシュベル!! うなれ！友情のザケル2 (Konjiki no Gasshu Beru!! Unare! Yūjō no Zakeru 2), inscribed as 金色のガッシュベル!! うなれ！友情の電撃2 (Konjiki no Gasshu Beru!! Unare! Yūjō no Dengeki 2), translates to "Konjiki no Gash Bell!! Wish! Zakeru of Friendship 2" and "Konjiki no Gash Bell!! Wish! Electric Shock of Friendship 2" from Japanese respectively.
Konjiki no Gash Bell!! The Card Battle for GBA Original release date(s): JP: July 28, 2005	Release years by system: 2005 – Game Boy Advance
Konjiki no Gash Bell!! The Card Battle for GBA Original release date(s): JP: July 28, 2005	Notes: Video card game developed and published by Banpresto in Japan, based on the official trading card game by Bandai.; 金色のガッシュベル!!サ・カードバトルfor GBA (Konjiki no Gasshu Beru!! Sa Kādobatoru for GBA), stylized and inscribed as 金色のガッシュベル!! THE CARD BATTLE for GBA (Konjiki no Gasshu Beru!! THE CARD BATTLE for GBA), translates to "Golden Gash Bell!! The Card Battle for GBA" from Japanese.
Konjiki no Gash Bell!! Unare! Yūjō no Zakeru Dream Tag Tournament Original release date(s): JP: November 24, 2005	Release years by system: 2005 – Game Boy Advance
Konjiki no Gash Bell!! Unare! Yūjō no Zakeru Dream Tag Tournament Original release date(s): JP: November 24, 2005	Notes: 2D fighting game published by Bandai.; 金色のガッシュベル!! うなれ！友情のザケル2 (Konjiki no Gasshu Beru!! Unare! Yūjō no Zakeru Dorīmu Taggu Tōnamento), inscribed as 金色のガッシュベル!! うなれ！友情の電撃 ドリームタッグトーナメント (Konjiki no Gasshu Beru!! Unare! Yūjō no Dengeki Dorīmu Taggu Tōnamento), translates to "Konjiki no Gash Bell!! Wish! Zakeru of Friendship Dream Tag Tournament" and "Konjiki no Gash Bell!! Wish! Electric Shock of Friendship Dream Tag Tournament" from Japanese respectively.

== PlayStation 2 and GameCube games ==
Title	Details
Konjiki no Gash Bell!! Yūjō Tag Battle Original release date(s): JP: March 25, 2004	Release years by system: 2004 – PlayStation 2
Konjiki no Gash Bell!! Yūjō Tag Battle Original release date(s): JP: March 25, 2004	Notes: 3D fighting game published by Bandai; 金色のガッシュベル!! 友情タッグバトル (Konjiki no Gasshu Beru!! Yūjō Tagu Batoru) translates to "Golden Gash Bell!! Friendship Tag Battle" from Japanese.; Developed in RenderWare game engine.
Konjiki no Gash Bell!! Yūjō Tag Battle Full Power Original release date(s): JP: August 5, 2004	Release years by system: 2004 – GameCube
Konjiki no Gash Bell!! Yūjō Tag Battle Full Power Original release date(s): JP: August 5, 2004	Notes: 3D fighting game published by Bandai; 金色のガッシュベル!! 友情タッグバトルFull(フル)Power(パワー) (Konjiki no Gasshu Beru!! Yūjō Tagu Batoru Furu Pawā) translates to "Golden Gash Bell!! Friendship Tag Battle Full Power" from Japanese.; Developed in RenderWare game engine.; A revised version of Konjiki no Gash Bell!! Yūjō Tag Battle that includes two new playable teams from the Konjiki no Gash Bell!! Unlisted Demon #101 theatrical film.
Konjiki no Gash Bell!! Gekitō! Saikyō no Mamono-tachi Original release date(s): JP: December 2, 2004 (PS2); NA: September 19, 2006 (PS2); NA: December 12, 2006 (GCN)	Release years by system: 2004 – PlayStation 2; 2006 – GameCube ^{(NA)}
Konjiki no Gash Bell!! Gekitō! Saikyō no Mamono-tachi Original release date(s): JP: December 2, 2004 (PS2); NA: September 19, 2006 (PS2); NA: December 12, 2006 (GCN)	Notes: 3D fighting game developed by Eighting and published by Bandai; Known as Zatch Bell! Mamodo Fury in North America.; 金色のガッシュベル!! 激闘!最強の魔物達 (Konjiki no Gasshu Beru!! Gekitō! Saikyō no Mamono-tachi) translates to "Golden Gash Bell!! Fierce Fighting! The Strongest Demons" from Japanese.; GameCube port only released in North America.
Konjiki no Gash Bell!! Yūjō Tag Battle 2 Original release date(s): JP: March 25, 2004; NA: October 19, 2005	Release years by system: 2004 – PlayStation 2, GameCube
Konjiki no Gash Bell!! Yūjō Tag Battle 2 Original release date(s): JP: March 25, 2004; NA: October 19, 2005	Notes: 3D fighting game developed by Eighting and published by Bandai; Localized as Zatch Bell! Mamodo Battles in North America.; 金色のガッシュベル!! 友情タッグバトル2 (Konjiki no Gasshu Beru!! Yūjō Tagu Batoru 2) translates to "Golden Gash Bell!! Friendship Tag Battle 2" from Japanese.; Developed in RenderWare game engine.
Konjiki no Gash Bell!! Go! Go! Mamono Fight!! Original release date(s): JP: December 15, 2005	Release years by system: 2005 – PlayStation 2, GameCube
Konjiki no Gash Bell!! Go! Go! Mamono Fight!! Original release date(s): JP: December 15, 2005	Notes: 2.5D fighting game developed by Eighting and published by Bandai; 金色のガッシュベル!! ゴー!ゴー!魔物ファイト!! (Konjiki no Gasshu Beru!! Gō! Gō! Mamono Faito!!) translates to "Golden Gash Bell!! Go! Go! Demon Fight!!" from Japanese.; Gameplay style based on the Super Smash Bros. series.
