= Zatch Bell! =

Japanese manga series by Makoto Raiku

- Cover of the first tankōbon volume, featuring Zatch Bell riding Owashi and Kiyo Takamine

金色のガッシュ!! (Konjiki no Gasshu!!)
- Genre: Adventure; Fantasy comedy
- Manga
- Written by: Makoto Raiku
- Published by: Shogakukan
- English publisher: NA: Viz Media; SG: Chuang Yi
- Imprint: Shōnen Sunday Comics
- Magazine: Weekly Shōnen Sunday
- Original run: January 10, 2001 – December 26, 2007
- Volumes: 33
- Anime television series
- Directed by: Tetsuharu Nakamura; Yukio Kaizawa
- Produced by: Takatoshi Hamano; Atsuya Takaze; Shinichi Ikeda; Hiroyuki Sakurada
- Written by: Akatsuki Yamatoya; Hiroshi Hashimoto
- Music by: Kow Otani
- Studio: Toei Animation
- Licensed by: NA: Viz Media
- Original network: FNS (Fuji TV)
- English network: CA: YTV (Bionix); IN: Cartoon Network; US: Cartoon Network (Toonami/Miguzi), Starz
- Original run: April 6, 2003 – March 26, 2006
- Episodes: 150
- Anime film

Zatch Bell! Movie 1: 101st Devil
- Directed by: Junji Shimizu
- Written by: Hiroshi Hashimoto
- Music by: Kow Otani
- Studio: Toei Animation
- Licensed by: NA: Discotek Media
- Released: August 7, 2004
- Runtime: 84 minutes
- Anime film

Zatch Bell! Movie 2: Attack of Mechavulcan
- Directed by: Takuya Igarashi
- Written by: Aya Matsui
- Music by: Kow Otani
- Studio: Toei Animation
- Licensed by: NA: Discotek Media
- Released: August 6, 2005
- Runtime: 85 minutes
- Manga

Konjiki no Gash!! 2
- Written by: Makoto Raiku
- Published by: Birgdin Board Corp.
- Original run: March 14, 2022 – present
- Volumes: 6
- Related media
- List of Zatch Bell! video games
- icon

Zatch Bell!, known in Japan as Konjiki no Gash!! (Japanese: 金色のガッシュ!!, Hepburn: Konjiki no Gasshu!!; "Golden Gash!!"), is a Japanese manga series written and illustrated by Makoto Raiku. It was serialized in Shogakukan's shōnen manga magazine Weekly Shōnen Sunday between January 2001 and December 2007, with its chapters collected in thirty-three tankōbon volumes. The series follows the title character Zatch Bell, a mystical being called a Mamodo, who is partnered with a 14-year-old schoolboy Kiyo Takamine for a once-a-millennium tournament on Earth that determines the right to rule the Mamodo world as king. During their adventure, Zatch and Kiyo encounter and battle various Mamodo and their human partners, and meet allies who aid Zatch in his quest to become a kind king.

Zatch Bell! was later adapted into an anime television series produced by Toei Animation. The series aired for 150 episodes on Fuji TV and other FNS stations from April 2003 to March 2006. In addition to an array of licensed merchandise, the franchise also spawned a series of video games and two animated theatrical films. Viz Media licensed both the manga and anime series for English-language localization in North America in 2005; only twenty-five volumes of the manga were published until 2009. The anime series ran in the United States on Cartoon Network's Toonami and Miguzi programming blocks from 2005 to 2007 for seventy-seven episodes, and in Canada on YTV's Bionix programming block from 2005 to 2008; in all, 104 episodes were dubbed in English.

By March 2017, the Zatch Bell! manga had over 23.8 million copies in circulation, including digital versions, making it one of the best-selling manga series. In 2003, the series won the 48th Shogakukan Manga Award for the shōnen category. The manga has received generally positive reviews from critics. It was praised for its unique characters, humor, and overall concept. The television adaptation has a more mixed reception, with criticism largely focused on the visuals, graphic violence, and voice acting.

A sequel to the original manga, titled Konjiki no Gash!! 2, began digital distribution in March 2022. By August 2024, Konjiki no Gash!! 2 had over 900,000 copies in circulation.

== Premise ==
Mamodo (Note: Mamono (魔物; lit. 'demon'); this is expressed as both singular and plural. Viz Media's English adaptations of the manga and anime pluralize the name "Mamodo" as "Mamodos". Discotek Media uses "demon children".) are a species of mystical creatures with supernatural powers inhabiting the fantastical Mamodo world (Note: Demon World (魔界, Makai; lit. 'Demon Realm'). Discotek Media uses "demon realm".) that exists in a parallel domain and is ruled by a king. Every 1,000 years, one hundred young Mamodo are selected to succeed the monarchy by engaging in an elimination tournament in which the winner would be eligible for the throne.^{[ch. 8]} These tournaments are held on Earth; the manga series chronicles the interim during the early 2000s. (Note: A concert ticket that Kiyo holds in the anime is dated 2003.^{ep. 14}) Although the competition is free-for-all, the Mamodo may collaborate with other combatants.^{[ch. 68]} As the Mamodo descend to Earth, they are each given a spellbook (Note: Spellbook (魔本, Mahon)) that has sealed away their powers and requires a human companion to read the words aloud in order to cast them in the form of spells. (Note: Jutsu (術) translates to "art", "technique", or "skill". Synonymous with Incantation (呪文, Jumon; "Spell").) To participate in the action, the Mamodo does not simply choose a human to help cast their spells.^{[ch. 93, 94]} Rather, they must first search for the matching human who can read from the book,^{[ch. 7]} whereupon he or she is that Mamodo's bookowner and partner.^{ep. 95} (Note: This is one of three scenarios described in the franchise. The second is the Mamodo world in which the Mamodo are free to cast spells as they desire. The anime introduces a third scenario called the "In-Between-World" (異世界, Yisekai; lit. 'different world'), where spells can be cast independently but only in the presence of a spell book.^{eps. 96–98})

The Mamodo tournament involves eliminating opponents by burning their spellbook. This is achieved by striking the book with a spell or subjecting it to open flame, as when Kanchomé torches several spellbooks with a matchstick.^{[ch. 115]} Once the spellbook ignites, it cannot be extinguished,^{[ch. 51]} and when it has fully incinerated, the Mamodo that possessed it loses all claim to the position as king and immediately returns to the Mamodo world. The sole Mamodo to survive without their book destroyed becomes the new Mamodo king,^{[ch. 8]} and all collateral damages are remedied.^{[ch. 322]}

Spells given off by the Mamodo produce a variety of effects. These range from direct attacks to defenses, but other spells trigger a Mamodo's special ability that can temporarily enhance their finesse; as with Zatch's Rauzaruk;^{[ch. 96]} (Note: Rauzaruku (ラウザルク) in the Japanese release.) or impair enemies; such as the paralyzing efficacy of Purio's Poreido;^{[ch. 68]} (Note: Poreido (ポレイド).) among other effects. Spells in each book are typically different for each Mamodo, but there are others that produce identical spells—an example of this is Zatch and his brother Zeno Bell for their lightning-based powers. The human and their Mamodo usually start out with one spell, but may during the tournament unlock more spells as the emotional and relational bond between each other flourishes.^{[ch. 19]} The spellbook responds to the reader's Heart Power, (Note: Kokoro no Chikara (心の力).) a form of stamina attained from such bond. Because sending out a spell expends Heart Power, it must thus be replenished for spells to work properly.^{[ch. 17, 107]} Additionally, a spell may be generated with greater fervor, the magnitude of which is governed by Heart Energy. (Note: Kokoro no Enerugī (心のエネルギー), or "strength from within" in the anime's English dub.) A demonstration of this is when Zatch's strongest attack, Bao Zakeruga, (Note: Baō Zakeruga (バオウ・ザケルガ); Bao Zakerga in the English release.) dwarfs Faudo.^{[ch. 275]}

=== Synopsis ===
==== Manga ====
The Mamodo of focus is Zatch Bell, who was discovered unconscious at a forest in England by Professor Seitaro Takamine. Seitaro sends Zatch over to his son Kiyo Takamine, (Note: Known by his original Japanese name, Kiyomaro Takamine, in versions by Discotek Media.) an intelligent 14-year-old living with his mother in the fictional city of Mochinoki, Japan,^{[ch. 2]} in hopes of uncovering Zatch's past that he has no memory of.^{[ch. 1]} Kiyo becomes Zatch's preordained partner for the tournament. Over time, Zatch and Kiyo come across other Mamodo, especially Brago and his partner Sherry Belmont, who explain the ongoing Mamodo tournament.^{[ch. 8]} Zatch and Kiyo also discover that some Mamodo do not wish to fight or do so for the wrong reasons; namely Kolulu, who was forced to fight due to the nature of her spells.^{[ch. 17]} Seeing this, Zatch pledges to become a "kind king" and stop the battle from ever happening again.^{[ch. 18]} Zatch and Kiyo also find friendlier Mamodo and build up alliances with them and their human partners. Chief among them are Kanchomé with Italian movie star Parco Folgore,^{[ch. 27]} Tia with pop idol Megumi Oumi,^{[ch. 38]} Ponygon with German engineer Kafk Sunbeam (although the two do not find each other until later in the series),^{[ch. 122]} and Wonrei with teen Hongkonger girl Li-en.^{[ch. 71]}

Throughout the course of the tournament, Zatch, Kiyo, and their allies band together to combat several potent Mamodo with hostile intent. The first major adversary they face is Zofis, who commands a cadre of reanimated Mamodo that were sealed in stone tablets during the previous tournament one thousand years ago. Zofis has also bent the will of his own partner, Sherry's childhood friend Koko, into committing heinous acts such as burning down her own village.^{[ch. 55]} Another enemy to emerge is Rioh, who wields a Mamodo warfare titan named Faudo^{[ch. 189]} that imperils the globe.^{[ch. 209]} Kiyo is nearly killed in a harrowing mission to thwart Rioh and avert Faudo.^{[ch. 215]} However, Rioh is then overpowered by Zeno Bell, Zatch's twin brother.^{[ch. 259]} Zeno is deeply envious of his sibling for procuring the sacred power of Bao from their father King Dauwan Bell,^{[ch. 272]} and had removed Zatch's memories out of spite,^{[ch. 48]} but he soon comes around and apologizes upon seeing the error of his own ways.^{[ch. 275]} The last and perhaps most powerful Mamodo encountered is Clear Note, who intends to commit omnicide against the Mamodo race.^{[ch. 289]} Zatch and Kiyo call upon the spells of all the Mamodo they previously met to quash Clear Note and return him to the Mamodo world.^{[ch. 319]}

In the aftermath, Zatch manages to pull through the tournament unscathed even though all of his allies fall and are brought back to the Mamodo world, leaving himself and Brago as the only remaining candidates on Earth. After Kiyo's graduation, the two ilk engage in a final showdown.^{[ch. 320]} Zatch ultimately prevails over Brago, thereby ending the tournament as the victor.^{[ch. 321]} As Zatch departs for the Mamodo world, Kiyo is rewarded a wish in exchange for all his painful memories of everything that had transpired and then given any fortune he desires, but he rejects the gift not wanting to forget Zatch.^{[ch. 322]} Three weeks after the tournament, the Mamodo send a letter to their human counterparts, with Zatch's letter stating that all is well in the Mamodo world.^{[ch. 323]}

==== Anime ====
The anime adaptation of Zatch Bell! is spread over three seasons, referred to as "levels", with distinct arcs. The first season takes place in the early stage of the Mamodo tournament and centers primarily on Zatch and Kiyo's character development. The second season follows Zatch and his allies battling Zofis and emphasizes Sherry's quest to rescue Koko from Zofis' throes. The third and final season revolves around Faudo which leads Zatch up to a climatic open conflict with Zeno. The anime observes changes from much of the manga. These include additional subplots and characters not featured in the original story. (Note: They appear in a colored montage at the end of the manga series.^{[vol. 33]}) Certain scenes and key events are also altered or chronologically rearranged. For instance, Zatch and Kiyo first learn about Zeno from another Mamodo they encounter^{ep. 16} rather than directly from Tia as in the manga,^{[ch. 39]} although she and Megumi corroborate the sighting later on.^{ep. 21} Ponygon also appears earlier in the anime's timeline^{ep. 7} than in the manga's.^{[ch. 56]} Discrepancies in the plot are more pronounced during the third season. In particular, Kiyo's death does not occur, and Zeno never repents even when he returns to the Mamodo world.^{ep. 150} Because of the changes, some Mamodo who lose out in the manga survive up to this point. The anime skips the events involving Clear Note and leaves the demise of Zatch's main allies and any remaining Mamodo unresolved. Instead, the series closes with an epilogue showing Zatch and Brago preparing to battle each other as the last two Mamodo on Earth, with the winner not revealed.

== Production ==
Following the ending of his previous series in Shogakukan's Shōnen Sunday Super magazine, Raiku revisited old drafts he created for new ideas for his next series. One of his first ideas was a mercenary who uses a giant sword to defeat enemies. He played with this idea for three months before deciding to abandon it and go for another idea. His next idea involved a middle school student who finds an old toy and, with the help of a noble knight, combats evil. While pitching this idea with his agent, he was advised to use a cuter character as a fighter, and so the titular character Zatch was created. After Raiku worked on the idea for a few months, it was published. Raiku said that he intended to create a "passionate story about a heartwarming friendship," and that he used the concept as a central theme while adding the Mamodo, book, and spell concepts. He cited a western magical story he read as a source of inspiration for creating Zatch's red spell book. Zatch's lightning spells allude to the fact that Raiku's name means "lightning" in Japanese. He also mentioned that he created Folgore with the words "Invincible Italian Man" as a base. Raiku went on a research trip in England while writing volumes five and six, which both take place in said country.

Zatch Bell! would be Raiku's last manga project published by Shogakukan. Once the series finished in December 2007, the company gave back his original artwork, a common practice for Japanese publishing companies. Of all the documents Raiku received, at least five drawings failed to turn up. Raiku accused Shogakukan of mishandling his artwork and, in 2007, filed a lawsuit seeking damages over the missing documents. He reached a settlement for ¥2.55 million (US$24,671.17) later that year.

The house in which Raiku authored the series was unique in that it doubled as a makeshift studio. Inside was a large collection of autographs from various manga artists displayed at the foyer, which was the first thing one would see upon entering the building. His studio also featured a high ceiling to prevent him from becoming claustrophobic, and he would spend an entire day there to meet a deadline. Raiku's collection of figurines would be displayed on the wall whenever he was present in the house. Raiku admitted that most of his work actually took place at a nearby restaurant where he also did most of his storyboarding. He added that there was less distraction, since he was just surrounded by people rather than games or even the Internet. Storyboarding for a regular chapter of Zatch Bell! took about two days for Raiku to make. When the editor approved the storyboard, Raiku summoned four assistants to the house for his project, and a fifth whenever necessary. Raiku sold the property in 2016.

== Media ==
=== Manga ===
Written and illustrated by Makoto Raiku, Zatch Bell! was serialized in Shogakukan's shōnen manga magazine Weekly Shōnen Sunday magazine from January 10, 2001, to December 26, 2007. The manga ran for a total of 323 chapters, collected in thirty-three tankōbon volumes, released from May 18, 2001, and June 18, 2008.

The series was licensed for the English-language release by Viz Media, which also provided the alternate title. The first two volumes of the series were released on August 2, 2005. Viz Media discontinued the series after twenty-five volumes, with the last released on June 9, 2009. The manga was also published in English by Chuang Yi in Singapore.

In March 2011, Raiku released a one-shot chapter of Zatch Bell! to promote the repackaging of the manga in a new bunkoban format under Kodansha. Sixteen volumes were published between March 8, 2011, and June 7, 2012. In July 2018, a digital sixteen-volume kanzenban edition of Zatch Bell! was released through Birgdin Board Corp., Raiku's own publishing company. The re-releases feature newly drawn cover art, color pages from the original Weekly Shōnen Sunday serialization, and a special bonus chapter in each volume called Zatch Café, (Note: Known in Japan as Gash Café (ガッシュカフェ, Gasshu Kafe)) which stars characters from that volume's cover. After successful sales and demand from fans, the kanzenban edition was released in physical format in 2019.

In February 2022, Raiku announced a sequel to the manga, titled Konjiki no Gash!! 2 (金色のガッシュ!! 2, Konjiki no Gasshu!! 2), which began its digital publication on various digital book services on March 14 of the same year. The first volume was released on September 16, 2022. As of January 15, 2026, six volumes have been released.

=== Anime ===
A 150-episode anime television adaptation, titled in Japan as Konjiki no Gash Bell!! (金色のガッシュベル!!, Konjiki no Gasshu Beru!!; "Golden Gash Bell!!"), was produced by Toei Animation, and directed by Tetsuharu Nakamura and Yukio Kaizawa, with Akatsuki Yamatoya and Hiroshi Hashimoto as the lead scriptwriters. It began airing on Fuji Television on April 6, 2003, and ran for 50 episodes per season, concluding after three seasons on March 26, 2006. The episodes were collected and distributed by Pony Canyon into three DVD series, labeled as "levels", consisting of seventeen DVDs each, totaling fifty-one sets: the first level was released from November 19, 2003, to April 20, 2005; the second level was released from May 18, 2005, to June 21, 2006; the third level was released from July 5, 2006, to March 7, 2007.

ShoPro Entertainment (then Viz LLC's sister company, later merged to form Viz Media) acquired the license to the anime series, under the title Zatch Bell! in 2004, and announced its home video release in August 2005. The English dubbed of the series (produced at Studiopolis) premiered in the United States on Cartoon Network's Saturday night programming block Toonami on March 5, 2005. The series was also broadcast on the network's daily programming block Miguzi starting on April 3, 2006. Seventy-seven episodes were broadcast on Cartoon Network until January 20, 2007. The series also premiered on YTV's programming block Bionix in Canada on September 9, 2005, and finished with the 104th and last English-dubbed episode on December 6, 2008. Thirteen DVDs, collecting the first fifty-two episodes, were released by Viz Media between November 8, 2005, and December 4, 2007. New Video Group released a DVD box set, Zatch Bell!: The Complete Seasons 1 & 2, on December 3, 2013, which included the first hundred episodes of the English dub. All 104 episodes of the English dub began streaming on Crunchyroll in 2015. In June 2017, Starz announced that it would be offering episodes of the series for its video on demand service starting on July 1, 2017.

=== Films ===
Toei Animation produced two animated films based on the TV series, both which serve as spin-offs. The first film, Zatch Bell!: 101st Devil, (Note: Known in Japan as "Gekijou Ban Konjiki no Gash Bell!! 101 Banme no Mamono" (劇場版 金色のガッシュベル！！ 「101番目の魔物」, lit. 'Movie Golden Gash Bell!! Unlisted Demon #101')) was released to Japanese theaters on August 7, 2004, and to DVD on December 15, 2004. Here, a vengeful Mamodo named Wiseman seeks to illicitly enter the tournament by stealing a coveted white spell book, then baiting Zatch into the Mamodo world as a means of displacing him from the battle for king. The film also explores Zatch's home world in finer detail and how a human partner is selected for each Mamodo, with Wiseman deemed incompatible for one. The second film, Zatch Bell! Movie 2: Attack of Mechavulcan, (Note: Known in Japan as "Gekijou Ban Konjiki no Gash Bell!! Mecabarukan no raishuu" (劇場版 金色のガッシュベル！！ 「メカバルカンの来襲」, lit. 'Movie Golden Gash Bell!! Attack of the Mechavulcan')) premiered in Japanese theaters on August 6, 2005, before coming out on DVD on January 2, 2006. This movie tells of a conceited Mamodo scientist, Dr. M2, from the future who invades Earth with an army of oversized robots resembling a toy that Kiyo made for Zatch in the main series.

Discotek Media licensed both films for distribution in North America. They were released on Blu-ray and DVD with the original Japanese audio and English subtitles on March 27 and May 21, 2018, respectively.

=== Video games ===
A number of video games have been created featuring characters of the Zatch Bell! series, with all but one being action or fighting games. Three games were imported and localized in North America. Zatch Bell! Electric Arena, initially released on December 12, 2003, for the Game Boy Advance, was the very first video game for the series. The second game titled Zatch Bell! Mamodo Battles, which debuted on March 25, 2004, for the PlayStation 2 and GameCube, became the first console game installment based on the series. Lastly, Zatch Bell! Mamodo Fury was released on December 2, 2004, for PlayStation 2 and is the only North American release for the GameCube. A video card game based on the series' CCG is the only installment not featuring in-combat form of gameplay. Eighting, Banpresto, and Bandai oversaw the development and publication of the Zatch Bell! games; since the merging of Bandai and Namco in 2004, GameCube versions are published under Namco Bandai Games.

A smartphone RPG game, titled Konjiki no Gash Bell!! Towa no Kizuna no Nakama-tachi (金色のガッシュベル!! 永遠の絆の仲間たち; "Zatch Bell! Friends are an Eternal Bond"), developed by Neowiz, is set to be released in 2023, with a closed beta test taking place in mid-September. The game was released on January 17, 2024. It ended service on January 31, 2025.

=== Other media ===
A toy line made by Mattel and a collectible card game, titled Zatch Bell!: The Card Battle, were released by Bandai in the United States and Japan.

== Reception ==
=== Manga ===
Zatch Bell! won the Shogakukan Manga Award for best shōnen title of the year in 2003. It ranked 33rd of the top 100 manga series on TV Asahi's Manga Sōsenkyo poll in 2021, in which 150,000 people responded.

By June 2008, the manga had over 22 million copies in circulation; by March 2017, it had 23.8 million copies in circulation, including digital versions. By August 2024, the Konjiki no Gash!! 2 manga had over 900,000 copies in circulation.

Jason Thompson from Anime News Network describes the series as "Zatch Bell! was one of hundreds of manga competing to be Number Two in the newly established genre of "heroes who fight using cute-but-violent monster/animal/pet companions." But Zatch is an extreme case because it's SO cute and SO violent, both at the same time, mixing squash-and-stretch body distortions, heta-uma ugliness, smiling faces and gushing blood". Mania.com's Jarred Pine's review of the first volume said that "The characters can look lopsided and out of proportions at times, with Kiyo experiencing Popeye arms on occasion. When the artwork gets more serious, it looks quite good, even though the added effect lines tend to make some panels feel a bit overdramatic, especially when Zatch is crying. The action work can feel quite explosive, with all the lightning bolts and flying icicles and all, which makes the Mamodo battle scenes a lot of fun. He added "The book really started off on the wrong foot with me with the introduction of Kiyo, one of the most irritating and arrogant lead characters in a shōnen manga. His attitude is not a result of any sort of disposition or a hard life, he's just a know-it-all that looks down on others. Luckily, Zatch's quirky and upbeat personality helps balance the scales and quickly goes to work on fixing Kiyo's bad attitude".

=== Anime ===
In 2005, the series ranked 20th on Animage's anime popularity poll, and 64th in the top 100 anime shows in a web poll conducted by TV Asahi. Although the show's English dub fared poorly in reviews, it became notable for its voiceover cast. Debi Derryberry, the voice for Zatch, was nominated twice for "Best Actress in a Comedy" at the American Anime Awards for her role as the titular character, while Jason Spisak placed fifth in the category "best English voice actor" in the SPJA Industry Award for his role as Kiyo. Dave Wittenberg was also nominated "Best Male Actor in a Comedy" for his portrayal of Parco Folgore. Philece Sampler was also accredited for her performance as the minor character Lori.

Anime News Network's Zac Bertschy review of the anime adaptation described it as "... mind-numbingly over-the-top, so enthusiastically bizarre, that it's difficult to not get sucked into its strange little world" but criticized how it was like a "battle your way to the top while learning important lessons about teamwork and courage" anime. He commented how the "sheer exuberance and energy" saves the show from being a bland anime and how it would be the perfect show for kids. IGN's review of the series was mostly negative. IGN's Jason Van Horn criticized the animation, plot, and dubbed voice acting. IGN's JKB stated the books are more interesting than the animation. Common Sense Media describes the story as "isn't just about violence". They also say that there are always challenges, adversities, and questions of identity that the characters face especially Zatch and Kiyo. They compliment how the characters often think aloud when talking about their painful experiences or flashbacks. They applaud on how each of the characters problems in the series are not far off on what kids deal with today. They criticized how the battles uses visuals, languages, sound effects, and dramatic effects that often get drawn out and sometimes become hard to watch. Overall, they said with the graphic violence and the internal struggles that the different characters face throughout the series some parents may not find Zatch Bell! appropriate for their children under ten years old.

=== Other media ===
Bandai's The Card Battle game had sold over 300 million units by May 2004.
