= Zatch Bell! Mamodo Battles =

2005 video game

- North American GameCube cover art
- Developer(s): Eighting
- Publisher(s): Bandai
- Composer(s): SuperSweep (Note: Music co-composed by SuperSweep members Shinji Hosoe, Ayako Saso, Yousuke Yasui, and Masashi Yano); Norihiro Furukawa; Takayuki Aihara
- Engine: RenderWare
- Platform(s): PlayStation 2, GameCube
- Release: JP: March 24, 2005; NA: October 19, 2005
- Genre(s): Fighting
- Mode(s): Single-player, multiplayer

Zatch Bell! Mamodo Battles, known in Japan as Konjiki no Gash Bell!! Yuujou Tag Battle 2!!, (Note: Japanese: 金色のガッシュベル!! 友情タッグバトル 2, Hepburn: Konjiki no Gasshu Beru!! Yūjō Taggu Batoru 2) is a 3D fighting game released in 2005 by Bandai. It is based on the Zatch Bell! anime and manga series by Makoto Raiku.

== Plot ==
Every one thousand years, one hundred mamodo descend upon the earth to fight the ultimate battle. The winning mamodo becomes the mighty king of the mamodo world. There is only one problem - in order for the mamodo to use their powerful spell books, they need a human partner.

The game depicts the storyline of the manga and anime just prior to the Ancient Mamodo arc.

== Gameplay ==
There is a story mode where the player can choose one of six characters to use and play through a unique campaign for each character. The game also has a time attack mode that scores the player after battling eight opponents, and a practice mode that allows the player to train against a dummy opponent.

As the player progresses and spends time in the game, they earn points that can be used to unlock upgraded characters. Points can also be used to purchase unlockable cards.

== Reception ==
Reception

Aggregate score
Aggregator	Score
GameRankings	65.14%

Review score
Publication	Score
GameSpot	5.0 out of 10

Reviews have been mixed. The game was criticized for being too simple and appealing only to fans of the anime. The single-player game was considered too easy and too short. However its cel-shaded art was praised for quality.
