= Zatch Bell! Mamodo Fury =

2004 video game

- North American PS2 cover art
- Developer: Mechanic Arms
- Publishers: JP: Bandai; NA: Namco Bandai Games
- Platforms: PlayStation 2, GameCube
- Release: PlayStation 2: JP: December 2, 2004; NA: September 19, 2006; GameCube: NA: December 5, 2006
- Genre: Fighting
- Modes: Single-player, multiplayer

Zatch Bell! Mamodo Fury (金色のガッシュベル!! 激闘!最強の魔物達, Konjiki no Gash Bell!! Gekitō! Saikyō no mamonotachi; lit. Golden Gash Bell!! Clash! Strongest Demons) is a fighting game released on the PlayStation 2. The original Japanese version was published by Bandai at the end of 2004, after merging with Namco but before the formation of Namco Bandai Games. The subsequent international releases and the GameCube versions were published under Namco Bandai Games. The game is based on the Zatch Bell! franchise.

== Plot ==
Every 1,000 years, 100 mamodo children are sent to earth. Each mamodo child comes with a spellbook, which will unleash strong powers when read by a human partner. The mamodo and human will then battle other mamodo for the title of the next "Mamodo King". If the spellbook is destroyed in battle, a mamodo will lose all chance of becoming King, and will return to the Mamodo World forever. The last one standing without their book burned will be crowned the King.

Kiyo Takamine is a 14-year-old Japanese boy genius who is bullied at school for his intellect. As a result, he is socially inept and has trouble making friends. Concerned, Kiyo's father, a professor teaching in England, sends a young boy named Zatch Bell to help him. Kiyo's father found Zatch dying in a nearby forest, where he had lost all of his memory except for his name, and also with the young boy, a mysterious book. It is soon discovered that Zatch is one of the mamodo competing for King, and after seeing a kindhearted mamodo named Kolulu fight against her will, he vows to become a benevolent Mamodo King and stop the fighting.

A few months later, the number of mamodo left on earth is down to 40 as an evil mamodo named Zofis rises. He had recently discovered that many mamodo from the previous battle a millennia ago were turned to stone along with their spellbooks by the legendary Goren of the Stone, also from the previous battle. Zofis revives the Ancient Mamodo with he mysterious "stone of moonlight" and brainwashes humans into reading their spellbooks, creating a whole new army of minions, planned to be sent out to defeat the remaining mamodo in order to become King. Zatch and Kiyo learn about his plan and battle their way through his army and finally confront Zofis.

Right after Zofis is sent back to the Mamodo World by the once again victorious Zatch Bell, a mysterious figure appears. The figure is a mamodo child who looks like Zatch, named Zeno, who claims to hate Zatch more than anything. The doppelgänger and his partner, Dufort prove to be tough for Kiyo and Zatch, and finally, Zeno declares that he will leave them alone for now, stating that he wants Zatch to "suffer" another "living nightmare" before finally defeating him. Zeno and Dufort leave, and although Zatch is initially worried about the "nightmare" his lookalike mentioned, Kiyo encourages him to become strong and that they will never give up. Zatch agrees, and the two proceed on, prepared for another adventure.

== Game modes ==
Story Mode: Play is done over the course of 40 levels consisting of different opponents. Often special conditions will need to be met, such as defeating an opponent with Bao Zakeruga. Note that this does not necessarily mean that the opponent be at minimum health. In addition to the regular Story Mode there is a series of mini games which are consolidated into "Zatch's Diary". These follow every day situations in Zatch's life. Previously played levels can be reselected either to improve rating or on higher difficulties.

Arcade Mode: Choose a character and fight against eight opponents. Once completed, a special cut-scene for the chosen character will play that contains dialogue between the mamodo and his or her partner. After the scene concludes you will see the statistics of all eight matches. These statistics determine the chance of the mamodo becoming King. To receive a 100% rating, all matches must be won with an "A" rating.

VS. Mode: This is a traditional one-on-one battle. Choose any character and stage and begin fighting immediately. Play can either be against CPU opponents or other people via two controllers. A ranking up system is also available. Stats for individual characters can be upgraded by the obtaining of "Mamodo Points", which are distributed after the conclusion of a match. The number of points given is based on the aforementioned ranking system, with "A" being the best and "E" being the worst.

4P Battle: Meant as more of a party mode, the 4P battles are in the form of mini games. These include "Burn the Spell Book", which has each player try to kick another's spell book into a small campfire, among others.

Mini-Games: This game mode contains seven mini games where certain goals must be completed. One level requires you to find 30 lollipops and give them to Kanchome within 80 seconds.

Gallery: The Gallery is split into several subtypes: the Model Gallery, which shows all the character models used in the game along with a short description of each; Visual Gallery, which has all the cut scenes from the Story Mode; Stage Gallery, which lets the player control Suzy Mizuno and roam freely along the multiplayer stages; and the Sound Gallery, which contains all the music from the game.

== Changes to the US version ==
A picture showing the changes to the HUD from the Japanese to the U.S. version.

- There are a few cosmetic changes to the HUD. The icons of the mamodo in the English version are removed, the indicators merely showing the character names instead. Also, in Story Mode of the Japanese version, character reactions are visible in both up-right and down-left corners of the screen while battling. However, in the U.S. version, they don't appear, although some of the dialogue remains.
- Certain story mode levels have been given different objectives. Near the end of the United States version, the player is usually given different objectives besides fighting, such as knocking out the opponent's spell book, trying to survive until the time runs out, etc. In the Japanese version, the player is to just fight them instead.
- The two versions also have graphical differences. The character models are given thick outlinings and slightly brighter coloration in the Japanese version. There are also few differences on how certain spells look, although they are minor differences. Minor differences can also be seen on certain characters' strongest spells, usually graphical differences, but sometimes audio differences as well.
- The voices in the Japanese version are of much higher sound quality. The United States version's voices are quite low quality and sound grainy.
- The lip syncing does not match the character's voices in the United States version. While the voices were replaced, the lip syncing was not changed whatsoever in the United States port, which is why it's inaccurate.
- The Japanese version has three exclusive songs (Intro song, credits song, and one of the battle themes). The United States version replaces two of them with its own exclusive songs (The intro song and credits song), however, the said exclusive battle theme song is replaced with an already existing song. The one missing song can be heard in the "Meadows" stage of the Japanese version. Strangely enough, the missing song was put back in on the GameCube port. The Japanese version seems to also have the United States version's credits songs within the game's files, although it is left unused and can only be heard in the Audio Gallery (The Audio Gallery is an unlockable feature where you can listen to the game's soundtrack)
- The Japanese version has a few moments where certain characters say lines that don't seem to be in the United States version (Ex: Zatch yelling "No!" at the end of the first battle against Robnos). One of these lines, though, were added back in the GameCube port (the line where Zatch yells "No!" at the battle against Robnos).
- The battle against Victoream is much more difficult in the United States version. Victoream has two times more defense in the United States version as opposed to the Japanese version. Victoream's battle is the only battle to have a character's stats modified between the two versions. Victoream's Artificial intelligence also seems to be slightly different in the Japanese version, as it uses a larger variety of spells.

== Reception ==
Reception

Aggregate score
Aggregator	Score	
Aggregator	GameCube	PS2
Metacritic	44/100	40/100

Review scores
Publication	Score	
Publication	GameCube	PS2
Famitsu	N/A	26/40
GameSpot	4.8/10	4.8/10
GameZone	4.3/10	N/A
IGN	N/A	3/10
Official U.S. PlayStation Magazine	N/A	2/10
PlayStation: The Official Magazine	N/A	4/10

The game received "generally unfavorable reviews" on both platforms according to the review aggregation website Metacritic. In Japan, Famitsu gave the PlayStation 2 version a score of 26 out of 40. GamePro said of the same console version, "a good license doesn't always add up to a good game and Mamodo Fury just doesn't have enough going for it to justify a purchase. Unless you eat your morning cereal out of a Zatch Bell bowl, wear Zatch Bell clothes and sleep atop Zatch Bell sheets, you should give this one a pass." (Note: GamePro gave the PlayStation 2 version 3/5 for graphics, two 2.5/5 scores for sound and control, and 2/5 for fun factor.)
