= Kiyo Takamine and Zatch Bell =

Kiyo Takamine and Zatch Bell!
- Zatch Bell! characters
- Kiyo Takamine (top) and Zatch Bell! (bottom) as drawn by Makoto Raiku.
- Created by: Makoto Raiku
- Voiced by: Japanese: Takahiro Sakurai (Kiyo); Ikue Ōtani (Zatch, EPs 1-141); Konami Yoshida (Zatch, EPs 142-150); English: Jason Spisak (Kiyo); Debi Derryberry (Zatch)

In-universe information
- Species: Kiyo Takamine (Human); Zatch Bell! (Mamodo)

Kiyo Takamine, known in the original version and in the Discotek Media movies as Kiyomaro Takamine (高嶺 清麿, Takamine Kiyomaro) and his Mamodo (known in Japanese as a mamono (魔物, lit. "demon")) partner Zatch Bell!, known in the original version as Gash Bell (ガッシュ・ベル, Gasshu Beru), are fictional characters in the anime and manga franchise Zatch Bell! by Makoto Raiku. Mamodos are beings from another world with supernatural powers. The series begins when Kiyo, by the request of his father, is told to take care of Zatch. Eventually, they become involved in a tournament between Mamodos where the winner becomes king of the Mamodo World.

Kiyo and Zatch were based on the design of a normal high school student and a noble knight who combats evil. The knight however was changed into a cuter character. In the Zatch Bell! character popularity polls, Kiyo and Zatch are voted one of the most popular characters ranking in the top three. Plush dolls based on Zatch's appearance have also been made.

== Creation and conception ==
After Raiku's Newtown Heroes series in the Shōnen Sunday Super ended, Raiku looked at his old drafts he created in the past for an idea for his next series. One of his ideals was a mercenary who uses a giant sword to defeat enemies. After playing with that idea for three months, Raiku decided to abandon it and go with another idea. His next idea was a story where a middle school student, the prototype of Kiyo, finds an old toy and with the help of a noble knight, combats evil. After taking this up with his editor, he was advised to use a cuter character to fight resulting in Zatch's creation. After Raiku worked on the idea for month, it was published. The reason Zatch uses lightning spells is because his name had the word "Rai", which means "lightning" in Japanese.

== Character outlines ==
Kiyo and Zatch in the anime.

=== Kiyo Takamine ===
Kiyo Takamine is a genius 14-year-old junior high school student with an IQ of over 180. His intelligence makes him a target for teasing and harassment causing him to develop an introverted and apathetic demeanor to the point where he skips school on a regular basis. However, his entire lifestyle changes when Zatch Bell! arrives in his life. Due to Zatch's influence, Kiyo becomes more outgoing and eventually becomes popular in his class. Kiyo still has a disturbingly bad temper and is easily irritated, often venting his frustrations on Zatch or his ditzy classmate Suzy Mizuno.

=== Zatch Bell! ===
Zatch is an overly cheerful boy who possesses a strong sense of justice, but is clueless about most of the world around him and often gets in trouble when not being supervised by someone. Kiyo makes Zatch a toy named Volcun 300 which he refers to as a friend. Zatch's favorite food is Yellowtail, which he prefers to eat whole. When Zatch arrived to the Human world, he lived in a forest until the day Zeno attacked Zatch and removed his memory of the Mamodo world. Kiyo's father finds him and sends him to Kiyo. During the progress of the series, it is revealed Zatch is empowered with the power of Bao, a powerful dragon created by Zatch's father during the last Mamodo battle. Due to the danger of Bao and Zatch's father's declining health, he transferred Bao into Zatch in order to prevent it from escaping and wreaking havoc in the Mamodo world. He soon sent Zatch to live as a normal Mamodo so he may never discover the power of Bao.

== Skills ==
Kiyo's Answer Talker ability demonstrated by the rings in his eyes.

Kiyo's high intelligence and quick decision makes making him an excellent tactician which allowed Zatch to defeat Mamodos much stronger than him. During the battle within Faudo, Kiyo gained an ability called Answer Talker (アンサートーカー, Ansa Toka) from being killed and subsequently brought back to life. This ability grants Kiyo the ability to know the answer to any question. Using the ability of Answer Talker in battle allows Kiyo to completely understand an opponent's attack, how to evade it, and how to effectively counterattack. Most of Zatch's spells causes Zatch to lose consciousness when cast. To get around this, Kiyo devised a method of reciting spells by training Zatch to look in the direction Kiyo points to.

Zatch's second spell, "Rashield", reflecting an attack in the third episode.

Zatch's primary offense at first is the spell Zaker (ザケル, Zakeru), which causes him to fire lightning from his mouth. During the course of the series, more powerful variations of Zaker are used in the order of Zakeruga (ザケルガ), Ganreizu Zaker (ガンレイスザケル, Ganreizu Zakeru), Teozaker (テオザケル, Teozakeru) and Ekuseresu Zakeruga (エクセレスザケルガ, Ekuseresu Zakeruga). Zatch's most powerful spell is Bao Zakeruga (バオウザケルガ, Baou Zakeruga) which conjures a giant electrical dragon. He later gains varieties of "Bao Zakeruga" such as Bao Kurou Disugurugu (バオウクロウディスグルグ, Baou Kurou Disugurugu) which conjures a giant claw Jiou Renzu Zakeruga (ジオウレンズザケルガ, Jiou Renzu Zakeruga) which conjures a serpentine "Bao Zakeruga" which attacks by shooting its scales, and Shin Beruwan Bao Zakeruga (シンベルワンバオウザケルガ, Shin Beruwan Baou Zakeruga), a manifestation of electricity in the form of a giant Lernaean Hydra.

Zatch also gains a wide range of versatile spells to assist in situations. Rashield (ラシルド, Rashirudo) erects a giant shield that reflect attacks back to the source while also adding electricity to the reflected attack, Jikerdor (ジケルド, Jikerudo) creates a ball of electricity that magnetizes anything following immediate contact, Rauzaruk (ラウザルク, Rauzaruku) amplifies Zatch's physical attributes, Zagurzem (ザグルゼム, Zaguru Zemu) to guide and increase the powers of Zatch's electrical spells, and Maazu Jikerdon (マアズジケルドン, Maazu Jikerudon) generates a huge ball of electricity capable of deflecting attacks and attracting the enemy into its epicenter where they are electrocuted.

== Plot overview ==
Kiyo's father sends amnesic Zatch to live with him where he discovers that reading a spell from Zatch's book causes lightning to come out of Zatch's mouth. Kiyo soon learns that Zatch is a Mamodo and is one of the one-hundred Mamodo candidates in the Mamodo Battles where the remaining Mamodo who has their book intact shall become the king of the Mamodo world and thus forcing Kiyo and Zatch to fend off attacks by other Mamodos. As the series progresses, Kiyo and Zatch befriend a Mamodo named Kolulu who reveals that the Mamodo King forced her into the tournament. Zatch upon hearing her story strives to become the Mamodo King in order to bring peace to the Mamodo World. During the course of the story, Kiyo and Zatch befriend a super star named Parco Folgore and his Mamodo Kanchomé, an idol singer named Megumi Oumi and her Mamodo partner Tia, a Chinese girl named Li-en and her Mamodo Wonrei, a genius magician named Dr. Riddles and his Mamodo Kido, and later, a German man named Kafk Sunbeam and his Mamodo Ponygon. An evil Mamodo named Zofis antagonists Kiyo and his friends prompting them to defeat him and prevent him from being the Mamodo King.

After Zofis' defeat, a group of Mamodos plan to awaken the giant Mamodo Faudo and use its power to win the Mamodo battles. Kiyo and his friends realize the threat Faudo could bring to the world and infiltrates Faudo's body in order to stop its resurrection. As they progress inside Faudo, Kiyo is killed in battle but is resuscitated into a catatonic state by Zatch. Zatch and friends move on and meet the one controlling Faudo, Zeno who reveals he is Zatch's twin brother. Kiyo awakens and with Zatch battles and defeats Zeno and sends Faudo back to the Mamodo World.

Later a powerful Mamodo named Clear Note reveals his intention to destroy the Mamodo world if crowned the Mamodo King. Kiyo and Zatch, with the help of friends, manage to defeat Clear Note leaving only Zatch and Brago battle as the remaining Mamodos. Zatch eventually engages and defeats Brago and is then crowned King of the Mamodo World. Zatch returns to the Mamodo world and restores the defeated Mamodos. Some time passes and Zatch sends Kiyo a letter telling him the peace of the Mamodo world.

== Appearances in other media ==
Kiyo and Zatch are the protagonists in the two spun off animated films Gekijou Ban Konjiki no Gash Bell!! 101 Banme no Mamono (劇場版 金色のガッシュベル!! ｢101番目の魔物｣, lit. Movie Golden Gash Bell!! Unlisted demon #101) and Gekijou Ban Konjiki no Gash Bell!! Mecabarukan no raishuu (劇場版 金色のガッシュベル!! ｢メカバルカンの来襲｣, lit. Movie Golden Gash Bell!! Attack of the Mechavulcan). The pair appear in all of the Zatch Bell! series video games where the pair are played as a single character.

== Reception ==
In the first Weekly Shōnen Sunday popularity polls of the series, Zatch ranked first and Kiyo ranked second. In the second and third Zatch Bell! character popularity contest, Zatch and Kiyo ranked first and third respectively. IGN's review of the first two Tankōbon of the series stated that Kiyo was not a likable character due to his abrasive attitude. IGN however described Zatch as "...a funny, quirky character that's easy to like and easy to get annoyed with fairly quickly". Mania.com's Jarred Pine review of the first volume also commented on Kiyo's irritating and arrogant persona. In the SPJA Industry Award, Jason Spisak was nominated fifth in the category "best English voice actor" for the voice of Kiyo. Debi Derryberry was nominated for "Best Actress in a Comedy" for her role as Zatch at the 2006 and 2007 American Anime Awards but did not win. Since the series was released, merchandise based on Zatch's appearance has been made such as plush toys and action figures.
