= Animal Land =

Japanese manga series by Makoto Raiku

- Cover of the first volume of Animal Land, published by Kodansha on March 17, 2010

どうぶつの国 (Dōbutsu no Kuni)
- Genre: Comedy; Fantasy; Dystopia
- Manga
- Written by: Makoto Raiku
- Published by: Kodansha
- English publisher: NA: Kodansha USA
- Imprint: Shōnen Magazine Comics
- Magazine: Bessatsu Shōnen Magazine
- Original run: October 9, 2009 – February 9, 2014
- Volumes: 14

Animal Land (Japanese: どうぶつの国, Hepburn: Dōbutsu no Kuni; lit. 'Country of the Animals') is a Japanese manga series written and illustrated by Makoto Raiku. The series follows a human baby abandoned by his mother who ends up in a world inhabited solely by animals and is raised by a tanuki (Japanese raccoon dog). It was originally serialized in Kodansha's Bessatsu Shōnen Magazine from October 2009 to February 2014. Later, it was compiled into fourteen collected tankōbon volumes by Kodansha in Japan. These volumes were licensed in North America by Kodansha USA and published from August 2011 to October 2018.

Raiku chose the animal world as the main theme of the series because he wanted a topic that had never been attempted before in a shōnen manga. The animals are used as a metaphor to explore human themes, and because of the subjects it deals with it has been described as "darker" than it apparently was. This, however, did not prevent it from being well received by critics and winning the Kodansha Manga Award for Best Children's Manga. It has also sold reasonably, appearing in weekly top ten lists of best-selling manga both in Japan and North America.

== Plot ==
A tanuki (Japanese raccoon dog) called Monoko (モノコ) has her parents killed by lynxes; she feels lonely as she is the only tanuki without a family. A day while she is fishing, Monoko finds an abandoned human baby, whose name is Taroza (タロウザ, Tarouza), and decides to raise him as her child. In a world inhabited only by animals, the human baby is a mystery; he can speak with all animal species even when the different species cannot communicate between them. This ability makes him able to save Kurokagi (クロカギ), a lynx who questions the world's concept of "law of the jungle". He injures himself while trying to protect the tanuki and vows to protect Taroza thenceforth. Seven years later, Taroza has reunited many other animal species and constructed a village, where he lives with them.

As the story progress Taroza meets with other humans: Capri (カプリ, Kapuri), a girl raised by lions; Jyu (ジュウ, Jū), a sadistic boy who lives along with a dog; Giller (ギラー, Girā), a man who wants to destroy all animals using genetically altered beings called "Chimera"; and Riemu (リエム), a girl raised by gorillas. In his quest to make all animals live in peace, Taroza discovers the existence of the "Eternity Fruit" that can be eaten by carnivore and herbivore. This fruit was created by Quo (クオウ, Kuou), the last human who lived some years before the start of the series. He had the same desire Taroza has and found the Eternity Fruit and the ability to speak are the solutions. For this purpose, he created a machine to make all animals understand others cries, and brought Taroza, Capri, Jyu, Giller, and Riemu from their times to the present.

== Production and themes ==
Makoto Raiku declared he wanted to write a story that was never seen in a shōnen manga magazine before. The first character Raiku created was Monoko, having initially envisioned her raising a baby in the human world, which he changed after talking with his editor. The fact the human baby can understand the cries of all animal species was described as "kind of like a powered-up version of the human ability of 'speech'." Raiku went to Maasai Mara National Reserve in Kenya to do research, and although needed to look at photographs of animals as he found them difficult to draw, the animals allowed him to make comical chapters even if he was dealing with "difficult themes."

Reviewers have discussed on its theme and content compared to its target audience. Silverman said Raiku uses the animals as a metaphor to humans while "handling of the darker side of societies." Silverman deemed it as "darker than it at first appears", compared it to The Fox and the Hound and pondered, "It is, at its heart, a tale of love and friendship and how together we are stronger than apart. But it is also a story of child-abandonment, the cruelties of nature, and the violence of the natural world." Katherine Dacey of School Library Journal cited its humor and art as "better suited" to tweens, while cited its "darker material", and compared Monoko's parents death to that of mother of Babar, a character by Jean de Brunhoff. Scott Green of Ain't It Cool News asserted that "There are plenty of bits here that are more Werner Herzog than Walt Disney" and that "It seems like it's for young kids, but it doesn't seem appropriate for them." Mark Thomas of The Fandom Post said it feels "a bit juvenile, both in story and in humor, but there are themes present that seem to be for an older crowd" and "scenes that [...] a lot of kids would struggle to understand".

== Release ==
Animal Land, written and illustrated by Makoto Raiku, was first published in Kodansha's Weekly Shōnen Magazine on September 9, 2009, as a one-shot titled "Episode 0". It served as a prologue to the regular serialization that was done in Bessatsu Shōnen Magazine from October 9, 2009, to February 9, 2014. Kodansha compiled its chapters into fourteen tankōbon (collected volumes) and released them from March 17, 2010, to March 7, 2014. Additionally, 28 authors wrote a yonkoma version of Animal Land for Bessatsu Shōnen Magazine's six-month anniversary, and two one-shots were also published in Weekly Shōnen Magazine on March 17, and August 18, 2010.

In December 2010, Kodansha USA announced it had licensed the series for an English-language translation for the Northern America. Its first volume was released on August 16, 2011, while the last volume was published on October 30, 2018. Seven days before the release of its final print volume, Kodansha with ComiXology also made digital volumes available until October 29, 2018. The manga has also been licensed in some countries such as in France by Ki-oon and in Taiwan by Tong Li Publishing.

=== Volume list ===
No.	Original release date	Original ISBN	English release date	English ISBN
1	March 17, 2010	978-4-06-384274-6	August 16, 2011	978-1-935429-13-5
1. "Episode 0" (エピソード0, "Episōdo 0") (Note: Although "Episode 0" is set before the events of Animal Land it was included in the third tankōbon volume.); 2. "Hello, Baby" (こんにちわ、赤ちゃん, "Konnichiwa, Akachan"); 3. "Baby's Power" (赤ちゃんの力, "Akachan no Chikara"); 4. "Baby, Cry by Name!" (赤ちゃん、名前で泣く!, "Akachan, Namae de Naku!")
"Episode 0": Kuro, a traveler lynx, ends up in a territory headed by the lynx Madaraze who says Kuro can stay if Kuro provides him meat. Seigo, a vegetarian lynx, gives Kuro a place to stay in exchange of him telling stories about his travels. Seigo makes a melody from Kuro's story, which Kuro likes and to thank him Kuro brings meat. Seigo instead suggests Kuro takes him to his journeys; Kuro yells he is too weak to survive. Madaraze gets angry to know Kuro offered meat to Seigo instead to him and orders Seigo to give Kuro a numbing leaf. Seigo instead warns Kuro and stays behind to protect him; Kuro, however, returns and rescues Seigo. A woman abandons her baby who is found by a recently-orphaned tanuki, Monoko, who decides to raise him as her child. She discovers the traumatized baby has abdicated to live; however, with the warmth of all the tanuki the baby lives. While no tanuki has been eaten in months, their fishes are being stolen by a black lynx dubbed "Kurokagi". A lynx attack headed by Kurokagi is announced but the baby finds out Kurokagi is, in fact, protecting the tanuki. The baby advises the tanuki, who help to heal Kurokagi after him being sore by other lynxes. Later, Monko finds a letter in baby's basket but try to hide it as she thinks it would separate him from her. In the end, she decides the right thing to do is to deliver it to him; the letter reveals his name is Taroza.
2	April 16, 2010	978-4-06-384286-9	October 18, 2011	978-1-935429-14-2
4. "Taroza Kidnapped" (さらわれたタロウザ, "Sarawareta Tarouza"); 5. "We Couldn't Live in Any Way But This One" (オレ達はこの生き方でしか生きれなかった, "Ore-tachi wa Kono Ikikata de Shika Ikirenakata"); 6. "Spring Sunlight is for All Animals" (春の日差しは全ての動物に, "Haru no Hizashi wa Subete no Dōbutsu ni"); 7. "Star of Fate" (運命の星, "Unmei no Hoshi")
In winter, Monoko and other tanuki go to take crab but a pack of hungry wolves kidnaps Taroza to use him as a bait to the other tanuki. Monoko, however, returns and with the help of Kurokagi and all the tanuki that pretend to be a bear they scare the wolves. To keep the tanuki alive, the elder reveals he has a stock of fishes to maintain them until the spring. Taroza suggests to give the wolves a fish but they refuse it and instead pursue Kurokagi, Taroza, and Monoko. However, a real bear shows up killing all the wolves but the youngest one, Zeke, whom Taroza vows to take care of. Later, Taroza wonders of his own utility as he cannot walk and provide food for himself. He decides he will make the world a place different animals can live together in peace by using his ability to understand different animals cries. In the end, an elephant reveals there is a human female.
3	August 17, 2010	978-4-06-384351-4	December 20, 2011	978-1-935429-15-9
8. "7 Years of Time Passes" (7年の時が流れる, "Shiti Nen no Toki ga Nagareru"); 9. "Princess Capri and the Lions, Gaoo!" (カプリ姫とライオンだガオー!, "Capuri Hime to Raion da Gaō!"); 10. "Monoko's Power, Taroza's Power." (モノコの力、タロウザの力。, "Monoko no Chikara, Tarouza no Chikara.")
After seven years skipped, Taroza protects a gibbon from a couple of lions and shows him the village where he lives. It is now using agriculture and there are many other animal species living together. Capri, the leader of the lions, says they will attack Taroza's village as she is intrigued by the existence of a similar animal on her. During the invasion, however, she feels "in heat" by Taroza and withdrawal, planning to seduce him; as she is rejected, she orders a new attack. Taroza and the animals of the village defeat the lions, and Capri is hit and collapses; when she wakes up, she is tread with wraps and Taroza says they must talk.
4	December 9, 2010	978-4-06-384407-8	March 20, 2012	978-1-61262-036-7
11. "Cruel Reality" (残酷な現実, "Zankoku na Genjitsu"); 12. "Taroza's Cry" (タロウザの泣き声, "Tarouza no Nakigoe"); 13. "It's a Festival! Everybody Gather Round!" (お祭りだよ! 全員集合, "Omatsuri Dayo! Zen'in Shūgō"); 14. "Jyu, Beast, Freedom" (ジュウ、獣、自由, "Jū, Jū, Jiyū")
Taroza wants to befriend with Capri but he does not accept she lives with lions as well as Capri does not accept he lives with tanuki. She returns to her territory and discovers one of her fathers were killed by three nomadic lions. The nomads return and kill the remaining adult male lions, and prepare to kill the children abandoned by her mothers. However, Taroza, Monoko, Kurogaki, and Zeke show up to rescue them, and Taroza's cry convinces the female to protect their children, expelling the nomads. To celebrate their victories over the lions, Taroza's village does a festival, wherein Capri and cub lions also participate. Meanwhile, close to the village a human boy called Jyu kills a pack of wolves; in the next day, he attacks Taroza's village as he disagrees with different animal species living together.
5	March 9, 2011	978-4-06-384468-9	July 3, 2012	978-1-61262-037-4
15. "Taroza's Truth" (タロウザの真実, "Taroza no Shinjitsu"); 16. "The Power of Fire, The Power of Numbers, The Power of Pinta" (火の力、数の力、ピンタの力, "Hi no Chikara, Kazu no Chikara, Pinta no Chikara"); 17. "Journeys Are a Risk to One's Life" (旅は命がけ。, "Tabi wa Inochigake."); 18. "Ena" (エナ, "Ena")
Jyu runs away after setting fire on the village, and also fascinates someone animals who decide to follow him. Albeit, Taroza and the other animals decide to rebuild a bridge to live in the forest the other side of the river that was not burned. The animals try the burnt food and they ask for Taroza to handle fire to make more, but he thinks it is unsafe. He learns water can extinguish fire, and decides to see the ocean along with Monoko, Kurogaki, the llama Dago, the horse Umagon, and the giraffe Pinta, who told him about the ocean. While on the journey, they are attacked by hyenas headed by Ena, who thought they were the horses that are attacking the hyenas. A human called Giller said to the horses the hyenas killed their child. It is not true because Ena does not kill children or females as a result of her tragic childhood.
6	June 9, 2011	978-4-06-384497-9	November 13, 2012	978-1-61262-038-1
19. "The Humans of Animal Land" (どうぶつの国におけるヒト, "Dōbutsu no Kuni ni Okeru Hito"); 20. "The Eternity Fruits" (永遠の実, "Eien no Mi"); 21. "The Animal That Is Not An Animal" (動物ではないどうぶつ, "Dōbutsu de Wanai Dōbutsu"); Extra Story: "The World That Taroza Is In" (タロウザのいる世界, "Taroza no Iru Sekai")
As Ena says peace words that can be heard by everyone, the horses know they were deceived by Giller. Taroza and his gang move out and finally reach the ocean, where the whale Hector says there are only five humans in the world. Hector tells Taroza that a now-dead human called Quo created a biotechnologically-altered fruit that can be eaten by carnivore and herbivore, "The Eternity Fruit." These fruits are in Gene Grail, a place in the top of a mountain inhabited created by Quo that is now inhabited by gorillas who do not want to share it. Riemu, a human girl who lives with the gorillas, says the seeds cannot leave the place, and asks for Taroza to stay, which he refuses. Later, Giller invades Gene Grail along with strange creatures called "Chimera" that can restore its own body after being crushed. Extra Story: Two deer, a mother and her child, are attacked by a dog, and are salved by Taroza and the animals of his village. Meanwhile, the narrator shows he is not the only human, showing Capri and Jyu.
7	October 7, 2011	978-4-06-384559-4	April 16, 2013	978-1-61262-249-1
22. "Seeds of Light, Legacy of Darkness" (光の種、闇の遺産, "Hikari no Tane, Yami no Isan"); 23. "Llama Waterfall" (ラマの滝, "Rama no Taki"); 24. "Quo Note" (クオウ·ノート, "Quo Nōto"); 25. "Takamine Quo" (クオウ·タカミネ, "Kuou Takamine")
Taroza inexplicably connects himself with the gorillas, sharing their movements and their pain as well; he destroys a Chimera but collapses. Giller forces Riemu to give him Quo's notebook, while Taroza is advised by the gorillas to take Riemu and the eternity fruits, and leave the place. After reuniting Pinta with his family, Taroza returns to his village, where an athletic festival is held to cheer up Riemu. At Gene Grail, Giller defeats Jyu, showing the Chimeras can use the power of the animals they eat. At the village, Riemu shows Taroza and Capri the second notebook of Quo. On it is written Quo had created a machine called Gaia Spinal, that is located at Tower of Babel, to allow animals to understand other's cries, and brought five humans from different eras to accomplish the task. The other Quo's notebook contained information about Chimeras, who can only survive by a food only found in Tower of Babel. Meanwhile, Monoko gives birth to a child sired by an unknown father named Moko. After Riemu and Capri saying they do not want him to go and the birth of Moko, Taroza is convinced his task is to protect his village and he should stay.
8	February 9, 2012	978-4-06-384622-5	October 15, 2013	978-1-61262-250-7
26. "Monoko" (モノコ, "Monoko"); 27. "Rebels" (反逆者達, "Hangyakusha-tachi"); 28. "Things That Don't Change, Things That Changed" (変わらないもの、変わったもの, "Kawaranai Mono, Kawatta Mono"); 29. "Lion Queen" (ライオンの女王, "Raion no Joō")
Three years have passed since Moko's birth; to thank Monoko for raising him Taroza goes on a trip with her and Moko. Taroza injures himself and attracts a wolf; however, Monoko attracts it for herself, dying as result. An angry Taroza decides to go to the Tower of Babel. Five years later, Giller improved his Chimeras to allow them to freely move, and Taroza, along with animals whose relatives had been killed, is combating them. He goes to the village to visit Monoko's grave, and sees that everyone has become stronger as they defeat a Chimera. Everyone joins Taroza and they set off toward Tower of Babel into two groups, one led by Taroza and other led by Riemu. While Riemu's group is confronted by Giller, Capri fights against Taroza's group.
9	July 9, 2012	978-4-06-384699-7	April 22, 2014	978-1-61262-546-1
30. "Animals with Wills" (意志を持つ動物, "Ishi o Motsu Dōbutsu"); 31. "Animals That Seek a Different World" (変わる世界を望む動物, "Kawaru Sekai o Nozomu Dōbutsu"); 32. "The Tower of Babel" (バベルの塔, "Baberu no Tō"); 33. "Catherine" (キャサリン, "Kyasarin")
As his new Chimera, "Luke", disobeys him, Giller takes him and Riemu in a bird-like Chimera, and returns to the tower. Capri and the lions retreat to fight against Taroza as they are informed there is an animal killing lions at the Tower of Babel. Meanwhile, Taroza and his gang stop at Gene Grail to rest and make a plan before attacking the tower. When they enter the tower, they meet a city and human-like Chimeras. They were created long ago to fulfill the loneliness humans had after being affect by Zelyda disease, that prevented them to have children. However, Giller order the Chimeras to show its real form and attack Taroza; the hippo Catherine is wounded and decide to stay in order to the others progress to the next floor.
10	December 7, 2012	978-4-06-384775-8	October 21, 2014	978-1-61262-557-7
34. "Angry Animals" (怒れる動物達, "Ikareru Dōbutsu-tachi"); 35. "Luke's Questions" (ルークの質問, "Rūku no Shitsumon"); 36. "Luke's Point of View" (ルークの視点, "Rūku no Shiten"); 37. "Taroza" (タロウザ, "Tarouza")
As there are only small passages, Taroza sends smalls animals to find Riemu, while the bigger ones fight against a human transplanted into a Chimera body. As he reveals he created the Chimeras, liked to kill animals and laughs at Catherine's death, the animals' power increase, eventually defeating the Chimera. Meanwhile, Giller scours Riemu's mind and find about "Abel," where he goes to try to give Chimeras eternal life. As Giller releases Riemu, Luke wants to know about humans, animals, and Chimeras from Riemu. Both Luke, talking to Riemu, and Sky, a man who lived with Quo, talking to Taroza, concludes that is possible to all animal species live together with the Eternity Fruit. Except for humans, though, as with only five humans they do not reach the minimum viable population. The remaining self-control Sky has is dominated by his Chimera's cells, and he enters Taroza's mind. He tries to induce Taroza to give up his dream and die; as he not do so, he pierces Taroza's chest. A human-like jellyfish called "Kokonotsuo Takamine", however, tries to heal Taroza.
11	March 8, 2013	978-4-06-384824-3	November 29, 2016	978-1-61262-978-0
38. "Babel Three" (バベル3, "Baberu Suri"); 39. "Animals That Connect to Hope" (希望を繋ぐ動物達, "Kibō o Tsunagu Dōbutsu-tachi"); 40. "The Face of Hope" (希望の顔, "Kibō no Kao"); 41. "Dogen" (ドウゲン, "Dougen")
Kokonotsuo Takamine asks for help through the tower's sound system, which Riemu responds. Takamine explains about his origin; Quo has created a brain and implanted into a jellyfish, to whom he gave the form of a human. While Takamine is still nursing Taroza, Giller sends Clover, one of the "Babel Three", a new type of enhanced Chimeras. It kills two weasels but is killed by Kiritobi; when Clover dies, its remains are eaten by another Babel Three, Belhem. The animals from lower floors climb to where Taroza is to fight Belhem; he is too strong and Dogen the tiger is only helping other animals to do not die. When Riemu arrives to heal Taroza, Dogen shows off his truly strength acquired from killing several different species of animals to survive in his past.
12	July 9, 2013	978-4-06-384889-2	August 22, 2017	978-1-63236-104-2
13	November 8, 2013	978-4-06-394956-8	October 31, 2017	978-1-63236-462-3
14	March 7, 2014	978-4-06-395018-2	October 30, 2018	978-1-63236-653-5

== Reception ==
The Young Adult Library Services Association, a division of American Library Association, included Animal Land on the 2012 list of "Great Graphic Novels for Teens". In 2013, Animal Land won the 37th Kodansha Manga Award in the category of Best Children's Manga. In addition, volume 8 entered the top 30 in weekly list of Oricon's best-selling manga, while volumes 10, 11, 13 and 14 were among the 50 best-selling manga of a week in Japan. The third English volume was also featured in The New York Times ranking of best-selling manga at the tenth position in January 2012. By September 2013, however, Kodansha USA stated Animal Land was one of their "lesser known series".

Its premise was very praised; Rebecca Silverman of Anime News Network called it "a fascinating story that should appeal to those looking for something a little different in their manga diet," while David Welsh of Manga Bookshelf complimented its "clever plot". Its "absurdist comedy" was highlighted by Chris Kirby of The Fandom Post; on the contrary, Ash Brown of Experiments in Manga felt its "focus on scatological humor" out-of-place. Mark Thomas of The Fandom Post praised its "somewhat interesting premise" but said it is hindered by a confusion on "what it wants to be", changing abruptly from drama to comedy—both of them were described as "flat" by him.

Kirby praised the art: "The style fluctuates perfectly between super cartoony and silly to more real characters with beautiful scenery." Brown said, "The artwork in Animal Land is a little strange—a combination of realism and anthropomorphism—but generally engaging." Silverman qualified it as "a mixed bag"; she commended the "lush" background artwork, while affirmed the tanuki look like humans dressed as animals, which is "difficult to accept."

Silverman criticized some "discrepancies", including the human features in the tanuki, Monoko's uncertain size and age, as well as the fact that Kurokagi wears clothes. Welsh commented on the anthropomorphic features in the animals, deeming it "creepy", also criticizing its "shrillness" because of the "hyperactive characters". In opposition, Kirby, comparing the tanuki's faces to the Excel Saga's Puchuu aliens, stated it has "plenty comedic value on their own." Kirby deemed the characters "interesting", and the world "fantastically different." Brown also praised the characters, especially Taroza, whose growth he appreciated to accompany. Scott Green of Ain't It Cool News commented that "It's a unique formula that that isn't quite convincing in its infant stage, but which becomes more attention commanding as it matures".
