= Makoto Raiku =

Manga artist

Makoto Raiku's signature in 2006

Makoto Kawada (河田 誠, Kawada Makoto; born August 23, 1974, in Gifu, Japan), known by the pen name Makoto Raiku (雷句誠, Raiku Makoto), is a manga artist known for creating the Zatch Bell! franchise. Starting off an assistant for Kazuhiro Fujita on his manga Ushio & Tora, he began creating several one-shots for the Weekly Shōnen Sunday shōnen manga anthology such as Bird Man (about a young pilot), Hero Ba-Ban (about a cheerful, but weak superhero) and Genmai Blade (about a teenage medicinal exorcist, of which he created both a one-shot and a two-part story). By 1999, he had created the series Newtown Heroes, which was published in Shōnen Sunday Super, a seasonal publication featuring upcoming manga artists and one-shots from the main Sunday book.

== Biography ==
=== Debut ===
In 2001, Raiku started the manga series Konjiki no Gash!!, which began publication in Shogakukan's Weekly Shōnen Sunday, and in 2003, inspired an anime version (Konjiki no Gash Bell!!) produced by Toei Animation. In English-speaking countries, both the manga and anime are known as Zatch Bell!. In one chapter of the Konjiki no Gash Bell!! manga, Raiku makes an appearance with his own story, and also plays the role of Umagon's partner in the game, Konjiki no Gash Bell!!: Electric Arena (prior to the introduction of Kafka Sunbeam). In 2003, Konjiki no Gash!! received the 48th Shogakukan Manga Award in the Shōnen category.

=== Civil trial ===
In June 2008, Raiku brought a case against Shogakukan to Tokyo District Court because they lost five of his coloured works. He demanded 3,300,000 yen as compensation, valuing each work at 300,000 yen due to the average price at which other original color drawings were sold at auctions. In his lawsuit, he called for the publisher to make a statement acknowledging the artistic value of the works that were lost. Raiku stated that he filed the lawsuit to oppose the overworking of manga artists by companies and drew attention to exploitation of artists by their publishers.

On July 28, 2008, they had their first public session. Shogakukan agreed they were responsible for the loss with a reservation on financial value of the lost works as it was not clear. Recommended by the judge, both parties agreed to settle the claim. After the case was settled, Makoto Raiku announced he would no longer do business with Shogakukan, and switched to Kodansha. His first work for Kodansha was Animal Land, which was serialized in Bessatsu Shonen Magazine.

=== Self-publishing ===
Raiku's third serialization, Vector Ball, ran in Kodansha's Weekly Shōnen Magazine from April 2016 until its abrupt end in March 2017, after Raiku refused to continue the story based on suggestions from his editor that he had previously agreed to follow. Over the next several years, he re-released his 3 serializations as ebooks, with both Konjiki no Gash!! and Animal Land receiving bonus content.

In May 2018, Raiku started a new company, Birgdin Board, under which he had ownership of his previous manga. He began working on a new series, a sequel to Konjiki no Gash!! which was published online by Raiku and Birgdin Board starting in March 2022.

== Works ==
- Bird Man
- Newtown Heroes (ニュータウン・ヒーローズ, Nyūtaun Hīrōzu)
- Genmai Blade (玄米ブレード, Genmai Burēdo; "genmai" means brown rice)
- Zatch Bell! (金色のガッシュ!!, Konjiki no Gasshu!!)
- Grief Warrior Hero Ba-Ban (哀愁戦士ヒーローババーン, Aishū Senshi Hīrō Babān)
- Aosora (アオソラ)
- Class Room (クラスルーム)
- Oyaju Rider (おやじゅ～ライダー)
- Animal Land (どうぶつの国, Dōbutsu no Kuni)
- Vector Ball (ベクターボール)
- Golden Gash!! 2 (金色のガッシュ!!, Konjiki no Gasshu!! 2)

== Associated manga authors ==
=== Master ===
- Kazuhiro Fujita

=== Fellow assistants under Fujita ===
- Kazurou Inoue
- Tatsuya Kaneda
- Nobuyuki Anzai

=== Raiku's assistants ===
- Yellow Tanabe
- Aiko Koyama
- Youhei Sakai
