= Noriko Shitaya =

Japanese voice actress

- 下屋 則子
- Born: Chiba Prefecture, Japan
- Occupation: Voice actress
- Years active: 2001–present
- Agent: 81 Produce
- Children: 2

Noriko Shitaya (下屋 則子, Shitaya Noriko) is a Japanese voice actress from Chiba Prefecture, Japan. She is known for her role as Sakura Matō in the Fate franchise.

== Voice roles ==
=== Anime television ===
==== 2000 ====
- Hamtaro, Sumire-chan, Tsutomu-kun

==== 2001 ====
- Parappa the Rapper Gallery (ep 17)
- Alien Nine (special), Kasumi Tōmine

==== 2002 ====
- Mirage of Blaze (ep 4)
- Tokyo Underground May (eps 7–9)
- Mirmo Zibang! Hanzo, Umezono Momo
- Shrine of the Morning Mist(ep 24)
- Petite Princess Yucie Girl 1 (ep 2), Student C (ep 8)
- Naruto Moegi

==== 2003 ====
- Mermaid Melody: Pichi Pichi Pitch Coral Spirit (ep 36), Mimi
- D.C. ~Da Capo~ Emi
- Popotan Girl A (ep 1)
- Massugu ni Ikou Saotome Nao
- Requiem from the Darkness Chiyoko (ep 9)
- Rumbling Hearts Schoolgirl B (ep 3)
- Maburaho Raika Naruo

==== 2004 ====
- Maria-sama ga Miteru Katsura
- Daphne in the Brilliant Blue Nurse
- Kannazuki no Miko Himeko Kurusugawa
- Kyo Kara Maoh! Beatrice (eps 56–78)
- The Marshmallow Times Classmate
- Galaxy Angel X Toshio (ep 6)
- One Piece Arbell Achino
- Elfen Lied Girl (eps 8–9)
- Bleach Ururu Tsumugiya
- Gakuen Alice Student A (ep 20)

==== 2005 ====
- Ah! My Goddess Goddess, Hijiri, real estate agent (ep 6)
- Emma: A Victorian Romance Collin Jones
- Glass Mask Dancer (ep 1), Keiko Tanaka (ep 16), Suzuki (eps 2–3)
- Tsubasa: Reservoir Chronicle Kotoko (ep 22)
- Majokko Tsukune-chan Himeko Kensennuma
- Rockman EXE Beast Trill
- Hell Girl, Miki Kawakami (ep 18)
- Fate/stay night, Sakura Matou

==== 2006 ====
- Fushigiboshi no Futagohime Gyu! Rosemary
- Air Gear Mari Tomita
- Gintama Girl (ep 21)
- Ah! My Goddess: Flights of Fancy Hijiri
- Kirarin Revolution Fubuki Toudou, Mii-tyan
- Coyote Ragtime Show Chelsea
- Onegai My Melody: KuruKuru Shuffle! Bako
- Fate/stay night Sakura Matō
- Pocket Monsters Diamond and Pearl Suzuna
- D.Gray-man Young Guzol (ep 5)
- Buso Renkin Saori Kawai

==== 2007 ====
- Shattered Angels Himiko
- Deltora Quest Francoise (eps 22–23)
- Venus Versus Virus Kyouko
- Naruto Shippūden Moegi
- Gurren Lagann Maosha
- Touka Gettan Suzume
- Kamichama Karin (2007), Himeka Kujyou
- Emma: A Victorian Romance Second Act Collin Jones
- Mameushi-kun Azuki
- Shugo Chara! Maika Himekawa (ep 6)

==== 2008 ====
- Kanokon Iku Sahara
- S · A: Special A Sayo (ep 14), Yui Oikawa (eps 13–14)
- Kyōran Kazoku Nikki Milcatopy
- Linebarrels of Iron Risako Niiyama
- Shugo Chara!! Doki— Nayuta Kusanagi (ep 67)
- Kurokami: The Animation Kuro

==== 2009 ====
- Gokujou!! Mecha Mote Iinchou Robin
- Cross Game Momiji Tsukishima

==== 2010 ====
- Heartcatch Precure! Kasumi

==== 2011 ====
- Infinite Stratos Maya Yamada
- Gosick Avril Bradley
- Kore wa Zombie Desu ka? Kyōko
- Chibi Devi! Mao
- Maken-ki! Haruko Amaya

==== 2013 ====
- Pocket Monsters XY Viola, Serena's Yancham

==== 2014 ====
- Fate/stay night: Unlimited Blade Works Sakura Matō
- Girl Friend BETA Remi Tamai
- Witch Craft Works Rinon Otometachibana

==== 2015 ====
- Pocket Monsters: XY&Z Serena's Yancham
- Yatterman Night Yatter Soldier B

==== 2016 ====
- Magical Girl Raising Project Koyuki's mother
- Tales of Zestiria the X Lailah
- Fate/kaleid liner Prisma Illya 3rei!! Sakura Matō

==== 2017 ====
- Tales of Zestiria the X Season 2 Lailah
- Boruto: Naruto Next Generation Moegi

==== 2021 ====
- The Case Study of Vanitas Amelia Ruth

==== 2022 ====
- To Your Eternity Season 2 Alma

=== Original video animations ===
- .hack//Intermezzo (2002)
- Psychic Academy (2002), Rusho
- Kaleido Star Legend of the Phoenix (2005), Girl
- Magical Witch Punie-chan (2006), Tetsuko Koku
- Baldr Force EXE Resolution (2006), Ren Mizusaka
- Carnival Phantasm (2011), Sakura Matō, Grail-kun

=== Anime movies ===
- Bleach: Memories of Nobody (2006), Ururu Tsumugiya
- Eiga de Tōjō! Tamagotchi Dokidoki! Uchū no Maigotchi!? (2007), Tanpopo
- Bleach: The DiamondDust Rebellion (2007), Ururu Tsumugiya
- Bleach: Fade to Black (2008), Ururu Tsumugiya
- Fate/stay night: Unlimited Blade Works (2010), Sakura Matō
- Pokémon the Movie XY - The Archdjinni of the Rings: Hoopa (2015), Serena's Yancham
- Pokémon the Movie XY&Z: Volcanion and the Exquisite Magearna (2016), Serena's Yancham
- Fate/kaleid liner Prisma Illya: Oath Under Snow (2017), Sakura Matō
- Fate/stay night: Heaven's Feel I. presage flower (2017), Sakura Matō
- Fate/stay night: Heaven's Feel II. lost butterfly (2019), Sakura Matō
- Fate/stay night: Heaven's Feel III. spring song (2020), Sakura Matō

=== Video games ===
- Ever 17: The Out of Infinity (2002, 2011), You Tanaka
- Final Fantasy II remake (2002), Maria
- Fate/stay night (2004), Sakura Matō
- Fate/Unlimited Codes (2008), Sakura Matō
- Otomedius (2007), Eru Tron
- Final Fantasy IV remake (2007), Rydia
- Trinity Universe (2009), Viorate Platane
- Final Fantasy Crystal Chronicles: The Crystal Bearers (2009), Althea
- Fate/Grand Order (2017), BB, Parvati, Qin Liangyu, Kama
- Granblue Fantasy (2019), Nier
- Azur Lane (2019), Glorious, Tallinn
- King's Raid (2020), Hilda
- Fuga: Melodies of Steel 2 (2023), Sheena Falafel
- Granblue Fantasy Versus: Rising (2023), Nier

=== Dubbing roles ===
- Thomas and Friends (Bill and Ben (Season 9 onwards, succeeding Tomoko Naka and Hiromi Nishida))

== Other appearances ==
=== Radio ===
- RADIO Kannazuki (RADIO神無月)
- RADIO Kyōshirō (RADIO京四郎) (August 30, 2006 – present)
