= List of Bleach characters =

The teenaged cast of Bleach's first arc in their high school uniforms. Left to right: Rukia, Ichigo, Chad (top), Tatsuki (front), Uryū, Orihime, Keigo (background) and Mizuiro.

This is a list of characters for Tite Kubo's manga and anime series Bleach. It takes place in a fictional universe in which the characters are split into various factionalized fictional races. They are subdivisions of humanity, but are distinguished by whether they live on Earth or in one of the afterlives, by possession of thematically contrasting supernatural powers, and by the use of aesthetics drawn from the artistic traditions of different real-life regions.

The main character of the series, Ichigo Kurosaki, has the ability to interact with ghosts. He soon meets Rukia Kuchiki, a female Soul Reaper from the Soul Society whose mission is to deal with hungering lost souls called Hollows. After seeing Rukia grievously wounded by a Hollow in his presence, Ichigo receives the power of exorcism and psychopompy to carry out her Soul Reaper duties as she recovers. As Ichigo guides the recently deceased to the afterlife while contending with Hollows, he clashes and forms alliances with the other supernaturally powered residents of the city, including his friends.

Many individual characters and the series' character design work have been praised, though Bleach's constantly-expanding character roster has been a point of criticism in the press. The size of the cast has been explained by author Kubo as the result of his writing process, in which he first creates new figures, then writes their personalities and character arcs, and finally assembles these interactions into a new plot. The overall response to this technique is mixed, with some reviewers believing the resulting characters are still relatively stereotypical and often get little individual focus, while others have remarked that even secondary characters feel like protagonists of their very own stories.

== Creation and conception ==
Bleach's creative process is focused around character design. When writing plotlines or having difficulties generating new material, Tite Kubo begins by thinking of new characters, often en masse, and rereading previous volumes of Bleach. Kubo has said that he likes creating characters with outward appearances that do not match their true nature, an element that can be found in many Bleach characters, as he is "attracted to people with that seeming contradiction", and finds an "urge to draw people like that when [he] works." When creating characters for the manga, Kubo first designs character appearances and only then decides what their personalities will be, in reflection of what he drew. When brainstorming character designs, he will go out and draw the faces of real people he sees, a hobby of his dating back to childhood. Kubo considers every character to be unique and wants each of them to have the opportunity for character development in the course of the series. When asked about potentially-romantic relationships between certain characters, Kubo states that he "doesn't want to turn the series into a love story", since he thinks there are more exciting aspects of their personalities to draw out.

Kubo has cited influences for elements of Bleach ranging from other manga series to music, foreign language, architecture, and film. He attributes his interest in drawing the supernatural and monsters to Shigeru Mizuki's Ge Ge Ge no Kitaro and Bleach's focus on unique weaponry and battle scenes to Masami Kurumada's Saint Seiya, both manga Kubo enjoyed as a boy. Bleach was first conceived from Kubo's desire to draw a shinigami in a kimono, which formed the basis for the design of the Soul Reapers. Several characteristics from them such as the kidō spells and the zanpakutō swords(katana) are also based on Japanese literature. Rukia Kuchiki was the first character Kubo designed, but he did not see her as a lead character, so he created Ichigo Kurosaki to be the series protagonist. Other characters from the series also use different languages to describe their terminology; the powers from the Quincy are taken from German, while Hollows and Arrancar instead use Spanish terms; for the latter, Kubo believed that the language sounded "bewitching" and "mellow" and that felt appropriate for a species of ghost. The names of several Arrancar are based on famous architects and designers who inspired scenery appearing in Bleach.

== Main characters ==
=== Ichigo Kurosaki ===
Ichigo Kurosaki (黒崎 一護, Kurosaki Ichigo) is the main protagonist of the Bleach franchise. A tall orange-haired high school student, Ichigo becomes a "Substitute Soul Reaper" after unintentionally absorbing most of Rukia Kuchiki's powers. His cynical nature at first makes him ill-disposed towards the duty, but, with the passage of time, he accepts and welcomes the strength his Soul Reaper powers give him. When creating the manga series, Kubo commented that Rukia Kuchiki, the first character he created, did not seem like a lead character, so he created Ichigo to be the series's main protagonist.

Ichigo is voiced by Masakazu Morita in the original Japanese version of the anime and by Johnny Yong Bosch in the English dub.

=== Rukia Kuchiki ===
Rukia Kuchiki (朽木 ルキア, Kuchiki Rukia) is a Soul Reaper,(死神, Shinigami, literally 'Death God'), who is assigned hollow extermination duties in Karakura Town. She meets Ichigo for the first time when she breaks into his house, not knowing that he can see her. Their relationship further complicates when Rukia saves Ichigo and transfers her powers to him. Rukia lacks it and cannot return to the Soul Society. She assumes a temporary lifestyle as a regular human, using a gigai (human form) obtained from Kisuke Urahara's shop, and enrolls into Ichigo's high school and takes up residence in his closet, while teaching him how to be a Substitute Soul Reaper in her place. Rukia was the first female character of the series created by Kubo, her design being the one he decided to use for all the other Soul Reapers.

Rukia is voiced by Fumiko Orikasa in the original Japanese version of the anime and by Michelle Ruff in the English dub.

=== Orihime Inoue ===
Orihime Inoue (井上 織姫, Inoue Orihime) is a long-time classmate of Ichigo and one of his closest friends. She used to have a crush on Ichigo since the beginning, however due to Ichigo's selfless wish as Substitute Soul Reaper to protect his loved ones, Orihime genuinely falls in love with him. Since the age of three, she had been an orphan when her older brother Sora left their abusive parents' home with her and raised Orihime on his own. Later on, when Orihime was in middle school, Sora died in an accident. Though initially devoid of spiritual powers, she develops spiritual awareness early in the plot. She later obtains the god-like ability to warp reality through rejecting past phenomena.

Orihime is voiced by Yuki Matsuoka in the original Japanese version of the anime and by Stephanie Sheh in the English dub.

=== Renji Abarai ===
Renji Abarai (阿散井 恋次, Abarai Renji), is a Soul Reaper of Squad 6 in the Gotei 13. When he was first introduced he played an antagonistic role as he was sent to the human world to find and bring Rukia back to the Soul Society. He initially dedicates his life to defeating Ichigo, before joining forces with him to rescue Rukia halfway through the Soul Society arc. He has since become a major protagonist and a consistent ally and rival of Kurosaki. His weapon throughout the series is Zabimaru.

Renji is voiced by Kentarō Itō in the original Japanese version of the anime and by Wally Wingert in the English dub.

=== Uryū Ishida ===
Uryū Ishida (石田 雨竜, Ishida Uryū) (Note: In the English translation of the manga, Uryū includes the macron over the second "u". In Viz's English subtitles of the anime and Bleach: The 3rd Phantom, it is written as Uryu without the macron.) is a Quincy, a descendant of a line of near-extinct, priest-like, hollow-hunting archers, who were historical enemies of the Soul Reapers. He bears a deep grudge against all Soul Reapers, including Ichigo, and is an early antagonist in the series, along with a double-agent for Yhwach in the Thousand-Year Blood War arc. He comes to view Ichigo differently over time, and eventually becomes a valuable ally and a friendly rival. As a Quincy, Uryū possesses the supernatural power to gather invisible "spirit particles" called reishi from the atmosphere. Once gathered, these particles can be shaped into spirit-energy constructs, foremost among them a bow and arrow, and to fuel various magical spells and superhuman abilities.

Uryū is voiced by Noriaki Sugiyama in the original Japanese version of the anime and by Derek Stephen Prince in the English dub.

=== Yasutora "Chad" Sado ===
Yasutora Sado (茶渡 泰虎, Sado Yasutora), better known as Chad (チャド, Chado), is one of Ichigo's friends at school. He is of mixed Japanese/Mexican heritage and a student who towers over his classmates at 6 feet 5 inches. Despite his imposing appearance and fearless attitude he is quite meek and refuses to fight unless it is for the sake of another. When he attempts to protect Ichigo's sister Karin and her friends from a hollow, he discovers a unique ability that strengthens and armors his right arm, enabling him to fight hollows. He is quite loyal to his friends, especially Ichigo, who is one of his closest friends. He displays little emotion except when something or someone he cares about is in danger.

Chad is voiced by Hiroki Yasumoto in the original Japanese version of the anime. In the English dub, Chad is voiced by Marc Worden from episode 2–85, by Jamieson Price from episode 86–366 and by Alain Mesa in Thousand-Year Blood War.

== Antagonists ==
=== Hollows ===
Hollows (虚(ホロウ), Horō) are the class of spirit that most enemies in the Bleach series they are part of. They are spirits that had been human but were not sent to Soul Society in due time after death. This makes them lose their sense of being and gives them a craving for human souls. Their main characteristic is a white mask completely covering their face and a hole near their chest. Each hollow's mask has a design unique to that individual. The Arrancars, Hollows who acquired humanoid form and Soul Reaper powers, become the primary antagonists later in the series under the command of the rogue Soul Reaper Sousuke Aizen and the ten strongest Arrancars known as the Espadas. The 10 Espadas are numbered 0–9, 0 being the strongest and 9 the weakest. But the rating also works with spirit pressure density numbered 1–10, with Espada's 0's power contained with a 10 tattoo.

=== Sousuke Aizen ===
Sousuke Aizen (藍染 惣右介, Aizen Sousuke) (Note: Aizen's given name Sousuke is also popularly romanized as Sōsuke with a macroned letter ō, or Sôsuke with a circumflex as in the manga's official Viz Media translation; this vowel contraction is erroneous given that So-u is separated by a clear morpheme boundary between two kanji: 惣 (そ, So) and 右 (う, u).) is the primary antagonist of the pre-timeskip half of the Bleach series. While introduced as the captain of Squad Five later revealed to have been behind various events prior to the series, Aizen has orchestrated a series of events in the Soul Society to obtain the Hōgyoku for his goal to create an Ōken to kill the Soul King with the aid of the Arrancars and rogue Soul Reapers he recruited. However, revealed to have played an indirect role in Ichigo's conception, Aizen is defeated by him, before being sealed by Kisuke and sentenced to the Muken for twenty millennia.

Aizen is voiced by Show Hayami in the original Japanese version of the anime and by Kyle Hebert in the English dub.

=== Bounts ===
The Bounts (バウント, Baunto) are a group of humans with special abilities. They are the primary antagonistic force during the anime-exclusive Bount and Bount Assault on Soul Society arcs. The Bounts live eternally due to an accident during a scientific experiment earlier in the Soul Society, where they were created, and began to eat the souls of human beings to gain more power. They each have a unique weapon known as a Doll, a familiar which is its creator's power given physical form. Dolls are mostly self-sufficient creatures when released, although they tend to be used as weapons in various ways such as a large battle axe or a snake, as a sword and whip. Their leader Kariya, motivated by the destruction of himself and all connected to him, plans to invade the Soul Society along with the remaining Bounts to destroy it and themselves. However, with the exception of his friend Gō Koga, Kariya managed to have his forces wiped out by the Soul Reapers prior to himself being killed by Ichigo Kurosaki. IGN criticized the Bounts as being "lame bad guys," noting that the bittō (the Bounts' mosquito-like creatures that collect souls) in particular were like "something straight out of a bad sci-fi movie," but admitted the Bounts were "decent plot devices" to develop the other characters.

==== Jin Kariya ====
Jin Kariya (狩矢 神, Kariya Jin) is the Leader of the Bounts who planned to destroy the entire Soul Society through the Jōkaishō, the device that created the Bounts. He was originally Eugene Currier, a boy who was befriended by the Soul Society scientist Ran'tao before being forced to leave his home when Soul Reapers are dispatched to kill the Bounts. Jin Kariya's Doll is Messer, having long absorbed it to manipulate wind without releasing it into its true form. While usings Messer's full power, Kariya can move the wind at such speeds in order to generate lightning and move at high speeds similar to a Flash Step. Eventually defeated in the end, Kariya's true agenda is revealed to be the mutually assured destruction of the Soul Reapers and the Bounts.

Jin is voiced by Tōru Ōkawa in the original Japanese version of the anime and by Troy Baker in the English dub.

==== Gō Koga ====
Gō Koga (古賀 剛, Koga Gō) is the one that was closest to Jin Kariya, whose Doll is the spider-like Dalk, who is able to manipulate her metallic body to create weaponry or be confronted into a battle axe that Koga uses. In the 1800s, while still going under the name Claude Gaugain, Koga was living in a countryside somewhere in Europe when Kariya brought him Cain to guide in their ways. But it ended with Cain's death which haunts Koga. In the end, after confronting Kariya and nearly getting killed by Hitsugaya, Kouga is the last remaining Bount as his wounds are tended to be Ran'Tao.

Gō is voiced by Tōru Furusawa in the original Japanese version of the anime and by Richard Epcar in the English dub.

Dalk is voiced by Takako Honda in the original Japanese version of the anime and by Karen Strassman in the English dub.

==== Cain ====
Cain (ケイン, Kein) is a young male Bount that Jin Kariya left in Gō Koga's care many years ago. When he tried to summon his mantis-like doll Waineton, the doll turned on Cain and killed him in front of Gō Koga.

Cain is voiced by Takayaki Fujimoto in the original Japanese version of the anime and by Peter Doyle in the English dub.

Waineton is voiced by Philece Sampler in the English dub.

==== Hō and Ban ====
Hō (鵬) and Ban (磐) are twin brothers who appeared when they used their dolls in order to attack Uryū Ishida. Hō and Ban's dolls are Guhl and Günther, bottle caps that manipulate water making its power source nearly unlimited. They can wrap themselves around their opponents in order to drown them or even flood a person's body killing them from the inside out. They are tasked by Kariya to eliminate Uryū while he is recovering in his father's hospital after he's been attacked by Ryō Utagawa. They fight Ichigo, Renji, Rukia and Sado and try to kill them by drowning them from the inside, but they are killed when Ganju uses some firecrackers to destroy their dolls, aging them to death.

In the original Japanese version of the anime, Hō and Ban are both voiced by Daisuke Sakaguchi. In the English dub, Hō and Ban are voiced by Roger Craig Smith and Brian Beacock.

==== Ryō Utagawa ====
Ryō Utagawa (宇田川 稜, Utagawa Ryō) served under Jin Kariya and had ambitions to overthrow him. Ryō Utagawa's doll is Fried, which takes the form of a golden snake with black stripes and green eyes when unsealed. Its powers allow Ryō to turn whatever Fried touches or sees into a snake. Ryō can also intercept attacks through a barrier called Snake Net. Once the technique is activated, if something is seen as a threat to Ryō through Fried, it will be attacked no matter where the threat runs to by snakes emerging from the ground. When it came to the fight against the Bounts at their mansion, Ryō was killed by Maki Ichinose and his body turns to dust.

Ryō is voiced by Shūsuke Sakino in the original Japanese version of the anime and by Tony Oliver in the English dub.

Fried is voiced by Miho Saiki in the original Japanese version of the anime and by Wendee Lee in the English dub.

==== Yoshi ====
Yoshi (ヨシ) is a member of the Bounts. She fought Rukia, Orihime, and Kuroda in an alley until Mabashi ordered her to leave. Later, she invades Soul Society with the other Bounts and nearly kills Rukia in a fight, but is forced to retreat when Byakuya intervenes. She then duels Ishida and dies at his hand when he realises she can't block and attack at the same time and forces her to attack him before piercing her heart with an arrow. Yoshi's doll is Nieder, who takes on the form of a jian and fan combination. In its base form, the fan can fire needle-like projectiles at its target. It can also be used for defense against regular attacks. The jian part of the Doll is used for regular offense. When the fan's size increases, it can protect Yoshi against all attacks, but Yoshi loses all form of offense. When the jian increases in size, its offensive power increases further, as the jian gains a trail of energy swords.

Yoshi is voiced by Yōko Sōmi in the original Japanese version of the anime and by Stephanie Sheh in the English dub.

The jian and fan parts of Nieder are voiced by Taro Yamaguchi and Mariko Kōda in the original Japanese version of the anime and by Joe J. Thomas and Wendee Lee in the English dub.

==== Mabashi ====
Mabashi (馬橋) interrupts Yoshi's battle against Rukia, Orihime and Kuroda. He uses his doll to control Rukia's body and use her to fight the others, but falls back once Orihime uses her powers to force it out of her body. During the Bount Assault on Soul Society, he poisons Soi-Fon and uses his doll to turn her squad against her, but is tricked by her and dies after being hit twice in the same spot by Suzumebachi. Mabashi's doll is Ritz, who has the ability to possess the body of anyone and control them.

Mabashi is voiced by Daisuke Ono in the original Japanese version of the anime and by Keith Silverstein in the English dub.

Ritz is voiced by Asami Sanada in the original Japanese version of the anime and by Sandy Fox in the English dub.

==== Sawatari ====
Sawatari (沢渡) is the oldest of the bunch. Sawatari's doll is Baura, who has a whale-like appearance that Sawatari sits on top of. Baura has a dimension in its stomach where anyone that is swallowed by Baura will die if they stay in him too long. He attacks Rangiku, Sado, Ururu and Noba in Karakura Town and uses Baura to swallow Ururu, who is saved when Rangiku uses Kido to force the doll out of the ground. During the Soul Society invasion, he runs into Mayuri Kurotsuchi and fights him, dying after being poisoned by Ashisogi Jizo.

Sawatari is voiced by Yuzuru Fujimoto in the original Japanese version of the anime and by Joe J. Thomas in the English dub.

Baura is voiced by Takaya Kuroda in the original Japanese version of the anime and by Richard Epcar in the English dub.

==== Ugaki ====
Ugaki (宇柿) is a member of the Bounts. Ugaki's doll is Gesell, which is a huge, eyeless monster. It has the ability to manifest many melee weapons from its limbs. Gesell can see through the eyes that generate light as his master does through his glasses. It is controlled by Ugaki through a deck of cards. Whatever is shown on a card Ugaki plays, appears within the shadow of an object, which is created by the light generated from the eyes. Ugaki fights Ichigo and Renji in a cave until signs of weakness causes him to be killed by his own doll.

Ugaki is voiced by Katsumi Suzuki in the original Japanese version of the anime and by Kirk Thornton in the English dub.

Gesell is voiced by Neil Kaplan in the English dub.

==== Yoshino Sōma ====
Yoshino Sōma (相馬 芳野, Sōma Yoshino) is Kariya's ex-wife, whose doll is a fire humanoid named Goethe that can regenerate from most attacks and sees his master as mother figure. Fighting against the other Bounts, Yoshino tried to take the soul of a human until she was stopped by Yoruichi. In the end, following Kariya's example, Yoshino absorbs Goethe to increase her power but is still killed with her energy used to create the Bittos.

Yoshino is voiced by Masako Katsuki in the original Japanese version of the anime and by Dorothy Elias-Fahn in the English dub.

Goethe is voiced by Richard Epcar in the English dub.

=== Xcution ===
Xcution (エクスキューション, Ekusukyūshon) is a secret organization in Naruki City that makes itself known to Ichigo seventeen months after he loses his Soul Reaper powers and serve as the primary antagonistic force in the first arc after the timeskip. The group is made up of humans whose preborn encounter with hollows resulted in them becoming outcasts who possess a power known as Fullbring (完現術(フルブリング), Furuburingu; lit. "Final Manifestation Art"), an ability to manipulate the "soul" of an object to bring out its full potential. But a Fullbringer's true power comes from enhancing the soul of an object they are compatible with, such as a prized possession. However, the effects of a Fullbringer's power will cease once the user is dead. Using Tsukishima's Fullbring, Xcution's other members had placed themselves in a fabricated notion that they need a Soul Reaper to become normal humans and train Ichigo to use Fullbring. But once Tsukishima restored their memories, the group reveals their real intention to take Ichigo's Fullbring powers. Though Xcution got Ichigo's Fullbring, they were scattered after Ginjō's death.

==== Kūgo Ginjō ====
Kūgo Ginjō (銀城 空吾, Ginjō Kūgo) is the leader of Xcution. In the past, he was the first Substitute Soul Reaper before he went into hiding upon learning that he was not trusted by the Soul Society. Ginjō later established Xcution and becomes its leader while having the Fullbringers exchange energies with him to cement their organization. Soon after, Ginjō has Tsukishima alter his memory to win Ichigo over before having his memories restored to siphon Ichigo's Fullbring. While his Fullbring power is Cross of Scaffold, turning his Saltire pendant into a large Claymore, Ginjō can use his Soul Reaper badge to augment his power. After absorbing Ichigo's Fullbring, Ginjō gains access to Ichigo's abilities. When he is unable to convince Ichigo that they were both wronged by the Soul Society, Ginjō releases his unnamed bankai to counter Ichigo's. However, Ichigo proves to be too strong as he manages to kill Ginjō.

After Ichigo requests permission to bury him in the land of the living out of respect, Ginjō ends up living within the Soul Society alongside Tsukishima and Giriko.

Ginjō is voiced by Hiroki Tōchi in the original Japanese version of the anime and by Travis Willingham in the English dub and by Christopher Swindle in the Thousand-Year Blood War arc.

==== Shūkurō Tsukishima ====
Shūkurō Tsukishima (月島 秀九郎, Tsukishima Shūkurō) is the former leader of Xcution and Ginjō's accomplice. His Fullbring power is Book of the End (ブック ・ オブ ・ ジ ・ エンド, Bukku obu ji Endo), a bookmark that transforms into a katana with two abilities: cutting through anything and inserting/removing false memories of whatever it cuts, living or not. If suiting his fancy, Tsukishima can use his power to destroy the minds of his victims by having them suffer mental breakdowns from an overdose of false memories. After Ginjō's surprise attack on Uryū, Tsukishima alters the memories of his fellow Xcution members to win Ichigo over while he places Orihime and Chad under his spell alongside Ichigo's sisters and friends. But once Uryū reveals Ginjō as the true mastermind and Ichigo's Soul Reaper powers are restored, Tsukishima causes Chad and Orihime to have a mental breakdown for his amusement until they are knocked out by Isshin and Urahara. Tsukishima then engages Byakuya in battle before being wounded and left to die. After Ichigo defeats Ginjō in a fight, Tsukishima attempts to kill Ichigo, only for his attack to be taken by Riruka instead. Afterwards while being carried away by Shishigawara, Tsukishima dies from his injuries with everyone under his spell restored to normally.

Following his death, Tsukishima was later seen living within the Soul Society alongside Ginjō and Giriko. At Ginjō's behest, he also helps restore Ichigo's Zanpakutō after Yhwach breaks it.

Tsukishima is voiced by Daisuke Ono in the original Japanese version of the anime and by Matthew Mercer in English dub.

==== Riruka Dokugamine ====
Riruka Dokugamine (毒ヶ峰 リルカ, Dokugamine Riruka) is a moody Fullbringer whose Fullbring is Dollhouse (ドールハウス, Dōruhausu), which allows her to freely move people and objects into or out of anything that she adores or finds cute. At a younger age, she abused her power out of love and ended up becoming an outcast before being found by Ginjō. Having becoming immediately turned on at the sight of Ichigo, Riruka uses her power to train him while reluctantly befriending Orihime. After her memories were restored, Riruka initially opposing using Ichigo's stolen Fullbring, Riruka engages Rukia using her Love Gun to trap the Soul Reaper in a doll through her Addiction Shot. But forced to use her Fullbring to enter Rukia's body after an exchange of words, Riruka changes sides and risks her own life to protect Ichigo from Tsukishima. After awakening in the Urahara shop, Riruka leaves Karakura Town after thanking Ichigo and group. Riruka is later enlisted by Kisuke to help Ichigo and his friends during the battle against Yhwach.

Riruka is voiced by Megumi Toyoguchi in the original Japanese version of the anime and by Cristina Valenzuela in the English dub.

==== Yukio Hans Vorarlberna ====
Yukio Hans Vorarlberna (雪緒・ハンス・フォラルルベルナ, Yukio Hansu Foraruruberuna) is the youngest member of Xcution. His Fullbring Invaders Must Die (インヴェイダーズ・マスト・ダイ, Inveidāzu Masuto Dai) allows him to insert people into another dimension, which is controlled by his video game console as long as it has battery life. Prior to joining Xcution, Yukio came from a wealthy family. But the neglect by his parents and turning to his power led to Yukio stealing his family's fortune and indirectly causing his parents' suicide after he ran way. Taking over in the last stages of Ichigo's Fullbring training, Yukio later gained a power boost that allows him to Fullbring without his game console. After being defeated by Toshiro Hitsugaya, later confronted by Jackie Tristan, Yukio decides to improve upon his father's company and eventually hire the surviving Xcution members. Yukio is later enlisted by Kisuke to help Ichigo and his friends during the battle against Yhwach.

He is voiced by Mitsuhiro Ichiki in the original Japanese version of the anime and by Lucien Dodge in the English dub.

==== Jackie Tristan ====
Jackie Tristan (ジャッキー・トリスタン, Jākkī Torisutan) is a Fullbringer whose Fullbring is Dirty Boots (ダーティ・ブーツ, Dāti Būtsu), whenever her boots get dirty, she becomes physically stronger with superhuman speed. After her power boost, Jackie gains exhaust pipes on her right shoulder that covers enough of her body in muck that she can shatter the ground with a simple step. Unlike the others in her group, as she was unable to protect her family with her power, Jackie hated her Fullbring and genuinely wished to be rid of it. She eventually got her wish after she seemingly sacrificed herself to get Renji out of Yukio's Fullbring, feeling some regret in losing her power while promised a position in Yukio's company alongside the other surviving members of their group.

Jackie is voiced by Atsuko Yuya in the original Japanese version of the anime and by Julie Ann Taylor in the English dub.

==== Giriko Kutsuzawa ====
Giriko Kutsuzawa (沓澤 ギリコ, Kutsuzawa Giriko) is a Fullbringer who serves as Xcution's bartender. Giriko's Fullbring is Time Tells No Lies (タイム・テルズ・ノー・ライズ, Taimu Teruzu Nō Raizu) which allows him to impose "timers" upon things and beings to which they are attached. These timers are linked to specific conditions that Giriko himself can set. But once the time period is established, however, not even Giriko himself can deactivate and the subject must attain the conditions or be burned away by time itself. After Xcution steals Ichigo's Fullbring powers, Giriko gained the ability to increase his body mass and strength in relation to the simplicity of his ability's condition. But to his shock, Giriko is easily bisected by Kenpachi Zaraki.

Following his death, Giriko was seen living in the Soul Society alongside Ginjō and Tsukishima.

Giriko is voiced by Atsushi Ono in the original Japanese version of the anime and by Michael Sorich in the English dub.

==== Moe Shishigawara ====
Moe Shishigawara (獅子河原 萌笑, Shishigawara Moe) is a hoodlum Fullbringer who works for Tsukishima, his Fullbring, named Jackpot Knuckle (ジャックポット・ナックル, Jakkupotto Nakkuru), increasing his luck to extreme levels using brass knuckles with three 7s on it. But the downside is that the longer he uses it, the weaker he becomes. Unlike the rest of Xcution, Shishigawara did not receive an upgrade to his powers as he battles Ikkaku who convinces him that his loyalty is misplaced as Shishigawara overheard Tsukishima and Ginjō agreeing that it would be in their best interests to kill Shishigawara. After the fight between the Soul Reapers and Xcution conclude, Shishigawara was last seen carrying the dying Tsukishima away.

Shishigawara is voiced by Hiroyuki Yoshino in the original Japanese version of the anime and by Todd Haberkorn in the English dub.

=== Wandenreich ===
The Wandenreich (見えざる帝国(ヴァンデンライヒ), Vandenraihi; "Invisible Empire") is a secret empire of Quincies ruled by Yhwach and are the primary antagonistic force in the final storyline of the Bleach series. The empire's military attire usually consists of long white trench coats fitted with numerous buttons, a cape, a belt (usually a piece individual to each member), and a five-pointed cross, the Quincy Zeichen, somewhere upon the uniform. The Wandenreich named its society from the act of hiding itself and its fortress Silbern (銀架城(ジルバーン), Jirubān; German for "Silver", Japanese for "Silver-Wrought Castle") within a pocket dimension in the Seireitei's shadows called Schatten Bereich (影の領域(シャッテン・ベライヒ), Shatten Beraihi; "Shadow Realm"). Apparently founded by the survivors of the Quincy massacre a millennium ago, the Wandenreich have been preparing to exact revenge on the Soul Reapers once amassing enough power to do so once their leader is revived. In the aftermath of Aizen's defeat, the Wandenreich conquered Hueco Mundo and captured numerous Arrancars (including the former Espada Tier Harribel) to serve as their personal Vanguards and foot soldiers. The Wandereich orchestrated two invasions on the Soul Society, the first leading to the notable deaths of Squad One's Lieutenant Chōjirō Sasakibe and Head-Captain Yamamoto. After absorbing the Soul King and altering the Royal Palace by submerging it with the Silbern, renaming it the Wahr Welt (真世界城(ヴァールヴェルト), Vāruveruto; German for "True World", Japanese for "True World Castle"), the Wandenreich planned to create a new world order, which would require a total genocide by destroying the Soul Society, the Real World and Hueco Mundo. However, after absorbing Ichigo's powers and the last two Sternritter survivors, Yhwach reveals his true goal was to eliminate all life in existence for bringing ruin and death to all living beings (including his children, the Quincys) for all eternity.

Quilge Opie leads one of the many Jagdarmee (狩猟部隊(ヤークトアルメー), Yākutoarumē; German for "Hunting Army", Japanese for "Hunting Corps") groups that hunt Arrancars. The Wandenreich also includes the Soldat (聖兵(ゾルダート), Zorudāto; German for "Soldier", Japanese for "Holy Soldier") serving as low-ranking soldiers sent to exterminate the remaining enemy soldiers after the elite force, the Sternritter (星十字騎士団(シュテルンリッター), Shuterunrittā; German for "Star Knights", Japanese for "Star Cross Knight Order"), have done defeating them. Four of the Sternritters, known as the Schutzstaffel (親衛隊(シュッツシュタッフェル), Shuttsushutafferu; German for "Protective Echelon", Japanese for "Imperial Guards") are additionally handpicked by Yhwach to serve as his personal bodyguards.

==== A: Yhwach ====
Yhwach (ユーハバッハ, Yūhabahha; English: /ˌjuːhəˈbɑːhɑː/ YOO-hə-BAH-ha), the primary antagonist of the post-timeskip half, is the sovereign of the Wandenreich and the progenitor of all Quincies. Yhwach is also the son of the Soul King, the being whose existence is vital to the Soul Society. Yhwach bares the epithet "A" for "The Almighty" (全知全能(ジ・オールマイティー), Ji Ōrumaitī; Japanese for "All-Knowing and All-Powerful"), the ability to see anything and everything that can occur all possible futures, and when he sees and knows of a power, it is rendered unable to defeat him. At its full capability, the ability can also alter the future in any way Yhwach wishes. When Yhwach was born, he already demonstrated supernatural abilities through infusing a part of his soul in other people to heal them of injuries and disabilities. But the moment a person healed this way dies, Yhwach regains that fragment, while gaining that person's abilities and knowledge. As this extended his life, revered as a holy child, Yhwach took the name of YHWH which the people proclaimed in his presence. Yhwach resolved to destroy the current reality to create a world without death, defeated by Yamamoto a millennium prior to the events of the series and sealed away for nine centuries and nine decades. Upon being freed, Yhwach spent the next nine years stealing the powers from "impure" Quincies to regain his power through his life-manipulating ability Auswählen (聖別(アウスヴェーレン), Ausuvēren; German for "Selection"). Among his victims were Ichigo's mother Masaki, as she protected her son Ichigo from the Hollow Grand Fisher, and Uryū's mother Kanae Katagiri. It appears his time imprisoned has left his sanity in question; he claims everything he is doing is for peace despite his sadistic behavior and dark humor.

Months after Aizen's defeat, Yhwach conquers Hueco Mundo by defeating its current leader Tier Harribel and imprisoning her while employing Arrancars as foot soldiers for the Wandenreich in preparation to invade the Soul Society. As Ichigo Kurosaki battled Quilge, Yhwach has the Sternritters invade the Soul Society and attempted to recruit Aizen while having Royd Lloyd pose as him. But once Yhwach arrives and executes Royd, he steals Yamamoto's bankai and uses it to kill him. Shortly after, Yhwach is then confronted by Ichigo and has a brief battle with him, during which he reveals that his mother Masaki was a Quincy before departing. Several days later, as Ichigo learned of his ties to the Quincy through both his mother and Zangetsu's likeness to how Yhwach looked 1000 years ago, Yhwach has Haschwalth bringing Uryū before him. Telling Uryū that he was the only impure Quincy who survived the effects of Auswählen, having a power that surpasses his own, Yhwach makes the young Quincy his heir before returning to the Soul Society to enact the final phase of his plan.

Shortly thereafter, Yhwach launches another attack on the Soul Society, replacing the Seireitei with Silbern. He oversees the battle and renders judgement on his subordinates who lost their battles, namely Cang Du and BG9. It is revealed that Yhwach spread pieces of his soul all over the Seireitei so that each death that occurs on the battlefield would prolong his life. After Ichigo returns to the Soul Society, Yhwach uses the opportunity to invade the Royal Realm where the Soul King resides. Accompanied by Uryū and Haschwalth, Yhwach is revealed to be accompanied by his strongest Sternritters as well when he summons them to engage Squad 0 and then revives them at the cost of his less powerful followers with Auswählen. From there, forced to reveal his true power, Yhwach defeats Ichibe'e Hyōsube before finding the Soul King. Though he mortally wounded the Soul King, Yhwach uses his influence over Ichigo's Quincy powers to have him kill the Soul King. But when Mimihagi intervened through Ukitake's sacrifice, Uryū holding off Ichigo, Yhwach decides to absorb Mimihagi while ordering his forces to kill anyone who intends to stop him from fully absorbing the Soul King. Yhwach eventually absorbed the entirety of the Soul King and Mimihagi's power before transforming the Soul King realm into the Wahr Welt, eventually revealing his intentions to be the only living thing in existence as he proceeds to carry out the task with Ichigo pursuing him. But after Aizen's attempt on his life, Yhwach finally ends up being killed by Ichigo after Uryū weakens the Quincy so a death blow can be made. Dying after telling Ichigo he condemned the world to continue the cycle of life and death, Yhwach's corpse becomes the new linchpin to reality while his spiritual pressure would briefly manifest ten years later before being extinguished.

Yhwach is voiced by Takayuki Sugō in the original Japanese version and the Japanese game Bleach: Brave Souls. In the English dub, he is voiced by Richard Epcar.

==== Sternritter ====
The Sternritter are the powerful Quincies in the Wandenreich's army who are used to purge the Shinigami:

===== B: Jugram Haschwalth =====
Jugram Haschwalth (ユーグラム・ハッシュヴァルト, Yūguramu Hasshuvaruto)), called "Jugo" by Bazz-B, is Yhwach's advisor and right-hand man and the grandmaster of the Sternritter, and also has the epithet "B" for "The Balance (世界調和(ザ・バランス), Za Baransu; Japanese for "World Harmony"), which allows Haschwalth to reflect any misfortune he suffers towards his opponent. Being a rare Quincy as he was born with the same power as Yhwach as he can possess his power while the older Quincy rests, Haschwalth lived with his uncle as a child before watching him die in a forest fire incited by Yhwach. Though Haschwalth and his childhood friend Bazz-B trained to someday avenge their losses, they ended up in the Wandenreich with Haschwalth's ability recognized by Yhwach and made his right-hand instantly. Like the rest of the Wandenreich, Haschwalth was sent to deliver their leader's war declaration, killing Squad 13's Hidetomo Kajomaru during the first invasion. Sometime later, Haschwalth helps Yhwach in his plan to steal Yamamoto's bankai by accompanying Royd Lloyd after he assumed their leader's form. After Yamamoto's death, Haschwalth is told to convey to the other Sternritter that they were to raze Soul Society before Ichigo arrived. He watches his master fight Ichigo before being called back to their palace, before which he easily breaks Ichigo's bankai. During Uryū Ishida's appointment as Yhwach's successor, Haschwalth remains calm while the other Sternritters object and preferred him over Uryū. Later, during the Wandenreich's second invasion, Haschwalth confronts Shunsui Kyōraku and Nanao Ise despite the latter uses a special kidō capable of preventing any Quincy from entering. Though Haschwalth breaks through the barrier, he is called back by Yhwach to punish the Sternritters who lost their respective fights. Haschwalth later creates the passage to the Royal Realm and accompanies Yhwach to help in his taking of the Soul King's powers, later mortally wounding Bazz-B in battle and questioning Uryū's loyalties while possessing Yhwach's Almighty ability. But when Yhwach uses his Auswählen on him, knowing his fate is sealed, Haschwalth uses his power to transfer Uryū's wounds onto himself before dying.

Haschwalth is voiced by Yūichirō Umehara in the original Japanese version of the anime and the Japanese game Bleach: Brave Souls, while Marina Inoue voices him as a child. In the English dub, he is voiced by Robbie Daymond while Ryan Bartley voices him as a child.

===== Schutzstaffel =====
The Schutzstaffel are the elite personal guard of Yhwach:

====== X: Lille Barro ======
Lille Barro (リジェ・バロ, Rije Baro) is the leader of the Schutzstaffel and a dark-skinned and somewhat arrogant Sternritter with a crosshair-like mark over his closed left eye and has the epithet "X" for "The X-Axis" (万物貫通(ジ・イクサクシス), Ji Ikusakushisu; Japanese for "All-Piercing"). This power makes him a dangerous figure as the Heilig Pfeil shot from his rifle Diagram is strong enough to pierce captain-ranked Soul Reapers and devastate areas with no means of blocking the blast, even more when he uses both eyes to use his full power while intangible. As leader of the Schutzstaffel, and the first of the Wandenreich to receive his unique power, Lille was hidden away in his leader's shadow until summoned to fight the Royal Guard. After Gerard and Pernida take out Senjumaru Shutara's guards, telling her the Royal Guard lost the moment Yhwach arrived, Lille proceeds to kill what he later learned was a decoy in Shutara's image as the Royal Guard spring their trap and is easily killed by Ōetsu Nimaiya. When Yhwach activates his Auswählen, Lille is revived alongside the other elite guards and severely wounds Ōetsu with his rifle. Lille is then given orders to kill any intruders in the altered Royal Realm, using his power to snipe down any Soul Reaper within his sight. As he tries to snipe down Shunsui, the Soul Reaper Head-Captain engages him in a fight that forces Lille to fight at full power while using his Vollständig, Jilliel (神の裁き(ジリエル), Jirieru; Japanese for "Judgement of God") to even the odds with Shunsui's attempt to kill him with his bankai allowing him to assume a divine centaur-like form. This forces Shunsui to give Nanao use of Shinken Hakkyōken, helping use the ability of her Zanpakutō to redirect Lille's strongest attack back on him. Severely injured, Lille falls down to the Seireitei, scattering into multiple, long necked flamingo bird headed like pieces of his Vollständig, and proceeds to destroy the Seireitei, only to be confronted by a revived Izuru Kira. It is most likely possible that he was killed by Yhwach's Auswählen and stripped of his power, along with the rest of his weakened clones.

Lille is voiced by Satoshi Hino in the original Japanese version of the anime and in the Japanese game Bleach: Brave Souls and by Evan Michael Lee in the English dub.

====== C: Pernida Parnkgjas ======
Pernida Parnkgjas (ペルニダ・パルンカジャス, Perunida Parunkajasu) is a cloaked Sternritter who is the severed left arm of the Soul King. Pernida possesses the epithet "C" for "The Compulsory" (強制執行(ザ・コンパルソリィ), Za Konparusorī; Japanese for "Compulsive Execution"), a sight-related ability that causes the opponent to collapse inward through a distortive variation of a Quincy's Blut (血装(ブルート), Burūto) ability invading the target's body. Pernida can also use that ability to manipulative inanimate objects and environments as well while absorbing the traits of those their Blut nerves infected. As one of the Schutzstaffel, Pernida was hidden away in Yhwach's shadow until summoned to fight Senjumaru Shutara's forces with her largest guard fatally distorted by Pernida's power before being killed by Ōetsu Nimaiya. Pernida is revived by Yhwach activating his Auswählen, facing Kenpachi Zaraki when he and Mayuri Kurotsuchi confront the mysterious Quincy who has orders to kill any intruders in the altered Royal Realm. Though they effectively take Kenpachi out of the fight by forcing the latter to amputate his distorted right arm, Pernida is forced to discard their cloak after Mayuri deduces the Quincy's attack method and severely injures them with acid. Pernida proceeds to use their power as the Soul King's left arm to take out Mayuri, who wants to study the entity a while more. But Pernida's regenerative abilities prove difficult for Mayuri before he uses Konjiki Ashisogi Jizō: Makai Fukuin Shōtai to create a Konjiki Ashisogi Jizō designed to counter Pernida before having his Zanpakutō eat Pernida. But Pernida destroys Konjiki Ashisogi Jizō from the inside before managing to destroy Mayuri's left arm prior to Nemu getting involved to heal her captain's arm, with Mayuri realizing Pernida's evolution ability as Nemu goes out all to protect him. But a Pernida clone manages to kill Nemu and eats her body, only to end up dying from excess regeneration due to the lieutenant's cellular makeup.

Pernida is voiced by Bin Shimada in the original Japanese version of the anime. In the English dub, they are voiced by Xander Mobus.

====== M: Gerard Valkyrie ======
Gerard Valkyrie (ジェラルド・ヴァルキリー, Jerarudo Varukirī) is a muscular Sternritter, believed to be the Soul King's animate heart, who wears a winged helmet and has the epithet "M" for "The Miracle" (奇跡(ザ・ミラクル), Za Mirakuru; Japanese for "Miracle"). This power allows Gerard to manifest the thoughts, feelings, and desires of the masses into reality. By manifesting the Soul Reapers' fear of him, he was able to empower himself, increasing his Godly Size (神の尺度(サイズ), Kami no Saizu; Japanese for "Godly Scale). As one of the Schutzstaffel, Gerard hides in Yhwach's shadow before being called forth to disarm Senjumaru Shutara while helping Pernida kill off Shutara's reinforcement guards. Though Gerard is easily killed by Ōetsu Nimaiya, he is brought back by Yhwach using Auswählen. Gerard is then given orders to kill any intruders in the altered Royal Realm, facing a group of Soul Reapers led by Shinji and Renji. But after grievous injuries inflicted on him by Byakuya, Gerard uses The Miracle to turn himself into a giant as he overwhelms the Soul Reapers before being frozen by Hitsugaya. Gerard breaks free, however, and engages Hitsugaya, Byakuya, and Kenpachi in battle. After Kenpachi activates his bankai and manages to bisect Gerard, Gerard recovers by activating his Vollständig, Aschetonig (神の権能(アシュトニグ), Ashutonigu; Japanese for "Power of God"), in response. Eventually, Gerard is killed by Yhwach's Auswählen after the Quincy Emperor has stolen Ichigo's powers.

Gerard is voiced by Tsuyoshi Koyama in the original Japanese version of the anime and by Dave B. Mitchell in the English dub.

====== D: Askin Nakk Le Vaar ======
Askin Nakk Le Vaar (アスキン・ナックルヴァール, Asukin Nakkuruvāru) is an aloof Sternritter who has the epithet "D" for "The Deathdealing" (致死量(ザ・デスディーリング), Za Desudīringu; Japanese for "Lethal Dose"), which allows Askin to calculate the "absolute lethal dose" of substance by consuming a lethal dosage of it. This allows him to not only increase or decrease the lethal dosage needed to kill his opponent, he can render himself immune to all consumed substances and projects it through attacks like Gift Ball (ギフト・ボール, Gifuto Bōru; German for "Poison Ball).

During the Wandenreich's second invasion, Askin appears in the place that had housed the Soul Society's Research and Development Institute, surprising most of its inhabitants yet taking his leave when Mayuri and Nemu Kurotsuchi appear. Noticing BG9's defeat against Suì Fēng, Askin confirms Mayuri's suspicions that the Wandenreich have prepared the possibility that the Soul Reapers have trained in different powers after their bankai had been stolen by them. Askin later accompanies Yhwach to the Royal Dimension after being promoted to as the fourth member of Schutzstaffel, the last to be killed by Ōetsu Nimaiya after his plot to poison the Soul Reaper's blood is thwarted when Nimaiya simply has Tenjirō Kirinji replace his blood with hot spring water. But Askin is revived by Yhwach activating his Auswählen, later finding himself fighting for his life against Grimmjow Jaegerjaquez when he confronts Ichigo's group while sent to kill any intruders in the altered Royal Realm.

As Ichigo, Chad and Orihime move on, Askin fights against Yoruichi and Yūshirō Shihōin, defeating the latter before finding himself facing Urahara as he instigates Yoruichi's transformation. This forces Askin activate his Vollständig (完聖体(フォルシュテンディッヒ), Forushutendihhi), Hasshain (神の毒見(ハスハイン), Hasuhain; Japanese for "God's Poison Taster"), defeating Yoruichi while using his Gift Ring to blind Urahara in one eye. But Urahara activates his bankai to overwhelm Askin, distracting the Quincy long enough for Grimmjow to land the death blow from behind. However, upon his death, Askin activate his Gift Ball Deluxe to increase in lethalness to kill both Urahara and Grimmjow resulting in the two being saved by Nelliel before they are taken by the poison.

Askin is voiced by Shunsuke Takeuchi in the original Japanese anime and in the Japanese game Bleach: Brave Souls and by Daman Mills voices him in the English dub.

====== Algora Lallau ======
Algora Lallau (アルゴラ・ララウ, Arugora Rarau) is an original generation Schutzstaffel member of the Wandenreich 1,000 years ago with an indeterminate rank. He was among those slain by Yamamoto's Zanka no Tachi. Many years later, Algora's corpse was among those summoned by Yamamoto's Zanka no Tachi, Minami: Kaka Jūman'okushi Daisōjin during his fight with Royd Lloyd.

Algora Lallau is voiced by Ryōta Takeuchi in the original Japanese version and by Grant George in the English dub.

====== Hubert Alexander Kleich ======
Huburt Alexander Kleich (ヒューベルト・アレクサンダー・クライヒ, Hyūberuto Arekusandā Kuraihi) is an original generation Schutzstaffel member of the Wandenreich 1,000 years ago who was the vice-captain of the Sternritter. He was among those slain by Yamamoto's Zanka no Tachi. Many years later, Hubert's corpse was among those summoned by Yamamoto's Zanka no Tachi, Minami: Kaka Jūman'okushi Daisōjin during his fight with Royd Lloyd.

Hubert Alexander Kleich is voiced by Hiroshi Kamiya in the original Japanese version and by Kieran Regan in the Funimation dub.

====== Johann Seydlitz ======
Johann Seydlitz (ヨハン・ザイドリッツ, Yohan Zaidorittsu) is an original generation Schutzstaffel member of the Wandenreich 1,000 years ago with an indeterminate rank and wearing an eyepatch. He was among those slain by Yamamoto's Zanka no Tachi. Many years later, Johann's corpse was among those summoned by Yamamoto's Zanka no Tachi, Minami: Kaka Jūman'okushi Daisōjin during his fight with Royd Lloyd.

Johann Seydlitz is voiced by Hiroshi Naka in the original Japanese version and by Jamie Simone in the English dub.

====== Nikita Deslock ======
Nikita Deslock (ニキータ・デスロック, Nikīta Desurokku) is an original generation Schutzstaffel member of the Wandenreich 1,000 years ago. She was among those slain by during the Wandenreich's earlier invasion of the Soul Society.

===== Other Wandenreich members =====
====== E: Bambietta Basterbine ======
Bambietta Basterbine (バンビエッタ・バスターバイン, Banbietta Bastābain) is a sadistic Sternritter who has the epithet "E" for "The Explode (爆撃(ジ・エクスプロード), Ji Ekusupurōdo; Japanese for "Bombing"), able to create bombs out of anything she mixes her spirit energy into. Bambietta fights with the 7th Division captain, Sajin Komamura, and steals his bankai. Like most of the Wandenreich, she is opposed to Uryu being named Yhwach's successor. During the Wandenreich's second invasion, she fought both Shinji Hirako and Komamura, the former of whom she manages to incapacitate despite his shikai state. However, Komamura manages to retrieve his bankai from Bambietta, at which point she activates her Vollständig, which amplifies her power and causes her to grow wings and a pentacle-shaped halo. The two fight, with Komamura using his Human Transformation technique and bankai to overwhelm and defeat Bambietta. Though she barely survived Komamura's attack, Bambietta is killed off by her fellow female Quincies to be used as Giselle's zombie bodyguard. In this new state, she is later summoned by Giselle to fight Ikkaku and Yumichika and defeated by Charlotte Chuhlhourne before later being reduced to a lifeless corpse when Giselle is mortally wounded and forced to treat her injuries by draining Bambietta's blood.

Bambietta is voiced by Ayana Taketatsu in the original Japanese anime and in the Japanese game Bleach: Brave Souls, and by Anne Yatco in the English dub.

====== F: Äs Nödt ======
Äs Nödt (エス・ノト, Esu Noto) is a gaunt Sternritter member who has the epithet "F" for "The Fear" (恐怖(ザ・フィアー), Za Fiā; Japanese for "Fear"), due to his ability to infect opponents with paralyzing, unstoppable fear. Normally, this only works if he stabs his enemies with his reiatsu thorns; however, upon activating his Vollständig, he can infect them by eye contact. In battles, he has a tendency to rant about the nature of fear, believing that true fear is instinctual and therefore unavoidable. Having been raised on the concept of Heaven and Hell, Äs is fearful of death and pain. While hospitalized and close to death, Äs is approached by Yhwach and accepts the Quincy's offer of power. During the first invasion, Äs Nödt stole Byakuya's bankai and used it to nearly kill him before interfering in Yamamoto's battles with Royd Lloyd alongside NaNaNa and Bazz-B, forced to fall back after getting nearly incinerated by Yamamoto's Ryujin Jakka. He later appears, when Yhwach names Uryu their successor. During the second invasion with orders to kill Byakuya, Äs Nödt confronts Rukia who is traveling across Seireitei in search for other Soul Reapers. With Rukia refusing to tell him where Byakuya is, Äs finds that Rukia is unaffected by his power as she is technically not alive by using her newly perfected Sode no Shirayuki's freezing power, thus not being able to feel fear. Rukia then proceeds to freeze Äs Nödt. The attack fails, as Äs merely activates his Vollständig, Tatarforas (神の怯え(タタルフォラス), Tataruforasu; Japanese for "Fear of God"), and infects Rukia via his enhanced powers before being sliced through by a newly recovered Byakuya. Äs recovers and assumes a more monstrous form on the expectation that Byakuya is going to be his opponent, but Rukia activates her bankai, Hakka no Togame, and destroys Äs.

Äs is voiced by Yoshitsugu Matsuoka in the original Japanese anime and by Elijah Ungvary in the English dub.

====== G: Liltotto Lamperd ======
Liltotto Lamperd (リルトット・ランパード, Rirutotto Ranpādo) is a young, preppy Quincy with the epithet "G" for "The Glutton" (食いしんぼう(ザ・グラタン), Za Guratan; Japanese for "Gluttonous"), the ability to extend her mouth into a massive maw to consume anything larger than herself. Despite her relatively petite appearance, she is quite profane, as shown when she calls out Bambietta for her habit in killing handsome men for her pleasure. When she and the other female Sternritters attack Kenpachi in his weakened state after he defeated Gremmy, Liltotto devours many of the Soul Reaper reinforcements. She later unsuccessfully attempts to attack Ichigo upon his return, thwarted by Ichigo himself, her fellow Sternritter Bazz-B, and then by several members of Gotei 13. Later, after nearly being killed by PePe's love spell on Meninas, Liltotto activates her Vollständig and proceeds to eat him upon his defeat by Kensei. She later manages to find Giselle, and the two are approached by a terrified and hysterical Robert Accutrone as he reveals Yhwach is going to use Auswählen to sacrifice all of them. Devastated by the treachery, Liltotto barely manages to grab Giselle as they escape with their lives despite losing their Quincy powers. Hurt by Yhwach's betrayal, Liltotto joins forces with Bazz-B to ally themselves with the Soul Reapers in entering the Royal Realm to kill their former master. Though she and Giselle reach Yhwach, they were overpowered and defeated.

Liltotto is voiced by Aoi Yūki in the original Japanese anime and by Cherami Leigh in the English dub.

====== H: Bazz-B ======
Bazz-B (バズビー, Bazubī), short for Bazzard Black, is a hot-blooded and merciless Sternritter who has the epithet "H" for "The Heat" (灼熱(ザ・ヒート), Za Hīto; Japanese for "Scorching Heat") as he can manipulate the temperature of surrounding spirit pressure with a finger to create flames and explosions, increasing the potency up to all five fingers. He is a childhood friend of Haschwalth, whom he nicknamed "Jugo", having crossed paths with him while the latter was hunting a rabbit. He vows to kill Yhwach ever since the sovereign burned down his home and trained with Haschwalth for five years, intending to earn Yhwach's trust afterward. Bazz-B defeated Izuru Kira and the other 3rd Squad members when he appeared in Soul Society, using his power to offset Head Captain Yamamoto's attack when it was about to consume him and his fellow Sternritters. He was one of the Quincy most opposed to Uryu Ishida being named Yhwach's successor, thinking Haschwalth would be the successor and confronting him about his acceptance to their leader's ruling. During the second invasion, Bazz-B overpowers Hitsugaya before Cang intervened to kill the Soul Reaper captain. Bazz-B later confronts Shinji, Momo, and Marechiyo, intending to stop them from intervening Kenpachi's fight with the other Sternritters. He then stops Candice and her group from fighting Ichigo any further prior to Yhwach's arrival to the battlefield. After failing to kill Ichigo, Bazz-B takes on Rukia and Renji before he loses his power then Yhwach uses his Auswählen on him and the other surviving members left to fight the Soul Reapers of Squad 0. Bazz-B regroups with Liltotto and Giselle as they ally themselves with the Soul Reapers in entering the Royal Realm to kill their former master. Bazz-B eventually finds Haschwalth, livid to learn that his friend knew the full effect of Auswählen and did nothing as he resolves to kill him first. But Bazz-B loses his right arm to Haschwalth before being left to bleed to death after being slashed down the left flank.

Bazz-B is voiced by Yūki Ono in the original Japanese version of the anime and in the Japanese game Bleach: Brave Souls, while Chiaki Kobayashi voices him as a child. In the English dub, he is voiced by Xander Mobus while Anne Yatco voices him as a child.

====== I: Cang Du ======
Cang Du (蒼都(ツァン・トゥ), Tsan Tu) is a Sternritter who has the epithet "I" for "The Iron" (鋼鉄(ジ・アイアン), Ji Aian; Japanese for "Steel") as he can turn his skin into a hardened material. During the first invasion, Cang fights Tōshiro Hitsugaya and Rangiku Matsumoto and manages to steal the former's bankai. In the second invasion, Cang is ordered to personally kill Hitsugaya, interrupting the latter's fight with Bazz-B. When Cang tries to activate Daiguren Hyōrinmaru, he is forced to relinquish the bankai due to Hitsugaya's use of the Shin'eiyaku to temporary Hollowfy him contaminated the weapon. Cang is eventually defeated and encased in ice with Hitsugaya's attacks, although he manages to break out of it after the activation of his Vollständig. Nevertheless, Cang was imprisoned alongside BG9 and brought before Yhwach for judgment. Though he uses his ability on the grounds of refusing to die by the hands of any other than Yhwach, Cang is bisected by Haschwalth.

Cang Du is voiced by Ryō Kuratomi in the original Japanese anime and by Landon McDonald in the English dub.

====== J: Quilge Opie ======
Quilge Opie (キルゲ・オピー, Kiruge Opī) is one of the leaders of the Jagdarmee squad who has the epithet "J" for "The Jail" (監獄(ザ・ジェイル), Za Jeiru; Japanese for "Prison") due to his ability to create flawless cages made of spirit energy. He is assigned in Hueco Mundo to capture Arrancars for Yhwach to use as Vanguards for the Wandenreich, having no toleration for disobedience and willing to act in a barbaric manner if offended. After easily defeating Loly and Menoly as well as Harribel's Fracción, he is confronted by Ichigo and his friends. He engages Ichigo in battle and activates his Vollständig, Biskiel (神の正義(ビスキエル), Bisukieru; Japanese for "God's Justice") and uses his Sklaverei ability to absorb Ayon. Receiving orders from Yhwach to keep Ichigo occupied while the Sternritter invade the Soul Society, Quilge struggles to keep up with Ichigo's movements and is unsuccessful in stealing Ichigo's bankai, causing Ichigo to assume the Wandenreich fear a Shinigami's bankai. Falling for one of Ichigo's taunts, Quilge attempts a counterattack only to be shot from behind by Kisuke Urahara. However, Quilge gets back up using Ransōtengai and shoots Urahara in the back, as well as severely injuring Yasutora Sado and Orihime Inoue and imprisoning Ichigo in a seemingly impenetrable cage. Just as when he was about to move in to kill the others, he is sliced in half by an off screen (or off panel) Grimmjow Jagerjaquez, effectively killing him.

Quilge is voiced by Koichi Yamadera in the original Japanese version of the anime and Xander Mobus in the English dub.

====== K: BG9 ======
BG9 (ベー・ゲー・ノイン, Bē Gē Noin) is a helmeted Sternritter who has the epithet "K". It has a single glowing eye, hides various robotic tendrils and artillery beneath its cloak and claims to have never "breathed", leading Suì Fēng to believe it is a robot. It is cruel and sadistic, not above threatening children if his demands are not met, as seen when he injures Omaeda's younger sister with one of his tendrils. During the Wandenreich's initial invasion of the Soul Society, BG9 stole Suì Fēng's bankai. While looking for Suì Fēng during the second invasion, it finds Omaeda and takes his younger sister as a hostage to force the lieutenant to give him his captain's whereabouts. Though attacked from behind by Suì Fēng, BG9 is unscathed as he greatly injures the captain with its weapons. Before it can deliver a finishing blow, Suì Fēng regains control of her bankai and uses it to attack BG9. As a result of its defeat, BG9 is brought before Yhwach for judgment while watching the execution of Cang.

BG9 is voiced by Hideyuki Tanaka in the original Japanese anime and by Aaron LaPlante in the English dub.

====== L: PePe Waccabrada ======
PePe Waccabrada (ペペ・ワキャブラーダ, Pepe Wakyaburāda) is an overweight Sternritter with a staff who has the epithet "L" for "The Love (愛(ザ・ラブ), Za Rabu; Japanese for "Love"), the ability to make people and anything with a heart madly fall in love with him to the point of attacking their own allies when asked. For the duration of the second Wandenreich invasion, PePe stood on the sidelines before he personally gets involved in the fighting by first forcing Hisagi to attack Byakuya and then having Meninas attack Liltotto so he would not have to share the credit for wiping out their opponents. Defeating Hisagi, Byakuya attempts to kill PePe after losing his zanpakutō to the Quincy's power. After assuming a Cupid-like form from his Vollständig Gudoero (神の性愛(グドエロ); Japanese for "Godly Eros), PePe is stopped from killing Byakuya by the arrival of the zombified Kensei Muguruma and Rōjūrō Ōtoribashi after Mayuri took control of them. Easily defeated by facing opponents who are immune as they do not know the meaning of love, a mortified PePe finds himself at Liltotto's mercy before she proceeds to devour him.

PePe is voiced by Ryū Yamaguchi in the original Japanese anime and by Zeno Robinson in the English dub.

====== N: Robert Accutrone ======
Robert Accutrone (ロバート・アキュトロン, Robāto Akyutoron) is an elderly Sternritter who has the epithet "N". During the first Wandenreich assault on the Soul Society, Robert fights Shunsui Kyōraku and shoots out the Soul Reaper captain's right eye with his Vollständig Grimaniel (神の歩み(グリマニエル), Gurimanieru; Japanese for "Walk of God"). He is later present when Yhwach declares Uryū Ishida will be his successor, and like the rest of the Wandenreich, Robert is shocked by his leader's decision. During the second invasion of the Seireitei, he and the other Stenritters confronting Ichigo Kurosaki, Robert is attacked and defeated by Byakuya Kuchiki. Recovering from his wounds before learning that Yhwach has continued without him and the others, Robert realizes the significance behind their leader's actions as he attempts to warn Liltotto before being killed as the consequence of Yhwach's Auswählen.

Robert is voiced by Takaya Hashi in the original Japanese version of the anime and by Neil Kaplan in the English dub.

====== O: Driscoll Berci ======
Driscoll Berci (ドリスコール・ベルチ, Dorisukōru Beruchi) is a large Sternritter who has the epithet "O" for "The Overkill" (大量虐殺(ジ・オーヴァーキル), Ji Ōvākiru; Japanese for "Massacre"), reflecting his power to become stronger every time he kills someone, such as Squad One's Lieutenant Chōjirō Sasakibe while stealing his bankai, Kōkō Gonryō Rikyū. He fights and defeats Shūhei Hisagi easily and is soon engaged by Yamamoto himself. Delighted, Driscoll activates Chōjirō's bankai and tries to kill the Head-Captain with it. However, it fails to have any significant effect on Yamamoto, who kills Driscoll.

Driscoll is voiced by Nobuaki Kanemitsu in the original Japanese version of the anime and by Bill Butts in the English dub.

====== P: Meninas McAllon ======
Meninas McAllon (ミニーニャ・マカロン, Minīnya Makaron)) is a ditzy Sternritter who has the epithet "P" for "The Power" (力(ザ・パワー), Za Pawā; Japanese for "Power"), possessing immense superhuman strength. When she and the other female Sternritters attack Kenpachi in his weakened state after he defeated Gremmy, immobilizing him with a single punch, Meninas focuses her attacks on the Soul Reaper captain while her associates deal with the Soul Reaper reinforcements. She later unsuccessfully attempts to attack Ichigo upon his return, thwarted by Ichigo himself, her fellow Sternritter Bazz-B, and then by several members of Gotei 13. During the battle with the remainder of the Gotei 13, Meninas is struck by PePe's "The Love" and ordered by him to attack Liltotto before being immobilized.

She is voiced by Reina Ueda in the original Japanese version of the anime and by Anne Yatco in the English dub.

====== Q: Berenice Gabrielli ======
Berenice Gabrielli (ベレニケ・ガブリエリ, Berenike Gaburieri) is a Sternritter with black and white colored hair who has the epithet "Q" for "The Question" (異議(ザ・クエスチョン), Za Kuesuchon; Japanese for "Objection") which plays on their power to force people to divulge their abilities when asked. Berenice fights Kenpachi Zaraki alongside Jerome Guizbatt and Loyd Lloyd. Kenpachi explained that they was a very arrogant individual who had something against him and explained their power to a great length, though Kenpachi admitted that he could not hear her too well due to Jerome's roaring ability. Berenice is killed by Kenpachi after having their throat torn out.

Berenice are voiced by KENN in the original Japanese version of the anime and by Ryan Johnston in the English dub.

====== R: Jerome Guizbatt ======
Jerome Guizbatt (ジェローム・ギズバット, Jerōmu Gizubatto) is a large dark-skinned Sternritter with an ape-like appearance who has the epithet "R" for "The Roar" (咆哮(ザ・ロア), Za Roa; Japanese for "Yell") as he assumes an ape-like form to dramatically amplify his voice to create a devastating sound-based shockwave. This ability proved to be no match for Kenpachi as he easily cuts Jerome in half and carried his corpse atop his sword.

Jerome is voiced by Takahiro Fujiwara in the original Japanese anime and by Todd Haberkorn in the English dub.

====== S: Mask De Masculine ======
Mask De Masculine (マスク・ド・マスキュリン, Masuku do Masukyurin) is a large, flamboyant Sternritter who has the epithet "S" for "The Superstar" (英雄(ザ・スーパースター), Za Sūpāsutā; Japanese for "Hero"), as his strength increases when he is applauded by his assistant, James. Mask also wears a Luchador Mask and arrogantly strikes warrior poses, wishing that he had an audience to see his battles while seeing himself as a hero. After Äs Nödt defeats Byakuya, Mask De Masculine knocks Renji unconscious as he was about to activate his bankai, causing Äs Nödt to scold him. In his second attack, he is accompanied by James who carries a boxing ring bell with him and makes it look like the fights Mask engages in are wrestling matches. Mask easily defeats Ikkaku, Yumichika, and Hisagi. He then claims he took down all the "Captain" level classes around him until he sees Rukia and Renji fall from the sky. He is intercepted by Kensei and Rose, the former of whom unleashes his bankai to knock out Mask. However, James encourages Mask to get back up and fight, activating his special ability and enabling Mask to knock out Kensei with ease. He then proceeds to destroy his own eardrums to negate Rose's bankai's special ability, and then blasts a hole through Rose's chest. Before he can kill Rose, Renji intervenes the attack and engages in battle with him. Renji manages to block all of Mask's attacks and also slices James to pieces before slashing Mask. However, as he can be revived by Mask, James's remains regenerate into numerous clones whose cheering causes Mask to activate his Vollständig. Mask manages to overwhelm Renji before being defeated and then incinerated by the Soul Reaper's perfected bankai. Because of Mask's nature as a Quincy, James was recreated after Yhwach absorbed the deceased Mask's powers.

Mask is voiced by Yasuhiro Mamiya in the original Japanese anime and by Bill Butts in the English dub.

James is voiced by Kenichi Suzumura in the original Japanese anime and by Christopher Swindle in the English dub.

====== T: Candice Catnipp ======
Candice Catnipp (キャンディス・キャットニップ, Kyandisu Kyattonippu) is a Sternritter who has the epithet "T" for "The Thunderbolt" (雷霆(ザ・サンダーボルト), Za Sandāboruto; Japanese for "Thunder"), which allows her to fire lightning bolts. She is quick to anger, as shown when she threatens her fellow Sternritter, Giselle, after the latter teases her. When she and the other female Sternritters attack Kenpachi in his weakened state after he defeated Gremmy, Candice takes out some Soul Reaper reinforcements before helping Meninas in attacking the Soul Reaper captain. When Ichigo arrives and throws Candice into a building, she takes the matters personally and resolves to kill him by activating her Vollständig to unleash her Electrocution attack. However, she is wounded by her opponent's Getsuga Jūjishō and has Giselle regenerate her severed arm. Candice is attacked by Bazz-B as she was about to resume her fight with Ichigo. However, before they can proceed with their intent, Candice and other Sternritter are stopped by several members of Gotei 13. She is shortly defeated by Byakuya, along with NaNaNa Najakoop and Robert Accutrone. She later has both her power and Vollständig stripped as well and left knocked out unconscious.

Candice is voiced by Yumi Uchiyama in the original Japanese version of the anime and in the Japanese game Bleach: Brave Souls and by Shara Kirby in the English dub.

====== U: NaNaNa Najahkoop ======
NaNaNa Najahkoop (ナナナ・ナジャークープ, Nanana Najākūpu) is a Sternritter who has the epithet "U" for "The Underbelly" (無防備(ジ・アンダーベリー), Ji Andāberī; Japanese for "Defenseless"), which allows him to determine his opponent's spiritual power distribution and produce a U-shaped "Morphine Pattern" marking on the opponent to create a weak point that he would capitalize on. During the first invasion, he engages Rose in combat before interfering in Yamamoto's battle with a disguised Royd Lloyd, barely surviving the Head Captain's Ryujin Jakka. After Renji defeats Mask de Masculine, NaNaNa spies on him while he is resting, surprised that he left himself exposed for so long and saying that his luck has run out. Later, NaNaNa is present when Bazz-B interrupts Ichigo's fight with Candice, eager to take Ichigo's head himself. He is stopped by several members of Gotei 13 and engages them in a fight instead. He is later shown to have been swiftly defeated by Byakuya. NaNaNa, alongside other surviving Sternritters, has his power forcibly extracted to empower Yhwach's four elite Sternritters. He analyzes the newly freed Aizen upon the latter's declaration to destroy the Royal Realm and tries to battle the Soul Reapers, but is shot down by Bazz-B before he can do anything.

NaNaNa is voiced by Tomoaki Maeno in the original Japanese version and by Zeno Robinson in the English version of the anime.

====== V: Gremmy Thoumeaux ======
Gremmy Thoumeaux (グレミィ・トゥミュー, Guremii Tumyū) is a young member of the Sternritter who has the epithet "V" for "The Visionary" (夢想家(ザ・ヴィジョナリィ), Za Vijonarī; Japanese for "Dreamer"), the ability to turn fantasy into reality. Because of this power, Gremmy is considered the strongest of the Sternritter and feared by even his allies. Originally being a disembodied brain in a dome casing, Gremmy used his ability to create a body for himself. During the second Wandenreich's invasion, Gremmy creates a stand-in named Guenael Lee (グエナエル・リー, Guenaeru Rī), whose "V" epithet stands for the "Vanishing Point" (消尽点(バニシング・ポイント), Banishingu Pointo) in terms of his ability to make his own shape and existence disappear at will, disappearing from both a person's sight and memory. After Guenael appears before a hiding Isane and Yachiru, with the latter forgetting him after she punched him in the face, Gremmy kills off his creation while revealing to the two Soul Reapers it was a distraction so he could kill Rose and Kensei. Gremmy almost killed Yachiru when Kenpachi arrives. Intending to kill the Soul Reaper captain with the power of his imagination, Gremmy engages Kenpachi in battle. Eventually, with Kenpachi using his own power against him by displaying his own, a furious Gremmy builds up his muscle strength in a desperate effort to defeat Kenpachi. But it results in Gremmy's death as his body breaks apart due to it not being able to handle the increased muscle mass. As Gremmy dies, he leaves a brain in a jar as his true form.

Gremmy is voiced by Natsuki Hanae in the original Japanese version of the anime and in the Japanese game Bleach: Brave Souls and by A.J. Beckles in the English dub.

Guenael is voiced by Tadashi Miyazawa in the original Japanese version and by Alex Cazares in the English dub.

====== W: Nianzol Weizol ======
Nianzol Weizol (ニャンゾル・ワイゾル, Nyanzoru Waizoru) is a Sternritter who has the epithet "W" for "The Wind" (紆余曲折(ザ・ワインド), Za Waindo; Japanese for "Twists and turns"), the ability to push away any attacks that he has seen and allows him to move around uninhibited. Having a habit of not completing his sentences, Nianzol has shaggy black hair and a rather inhuman appearance with two tongues sticking from his mouth. Nianzol accompanies Yhwach, Haschwalth, and Ishida during their raid of the Soul King Palace, acting as Yhwach's "shadow" to protect him from the Royal Guards before revealing himself. However, defeating most of Senjumaru Shutara's guards, Nianzol finds that she altered his trenchcoat and dies of impalement by the article of clothing during his attempt to remove it.

Nianzol is voiced by Sōichirō Hoshi in the original Japanese version of the anime and by Robbie Daymond in the English dub.

====== Y: Lloyd Brothers ======
L. Loyd Lloyd ("Lの"ロイド・ロイド, Eru no Roido Roido) is a bald Quincy with a third eye on his forehead who has an identical twin brother named R. Royd Lloyd ("Rの"ロイド・ロイド, Aru no Roido Roido). Their identical appearance is the result of their ability to imitate others as they have subconsciously used it on each other before being born. The two joined the Wandenreich under the same epithet "Y" for "The Yourself" (貴方自身(ジ・ユアセルフ), Ji Yuaserufu; Japanese for "Yourself") that plays on their shape-shifting powers. However, while both can assume the forms of others, only Loyd could replicate one's powers and techniques while Royd instead copy his target's memories and personality. During the attack on the Soul Society, as Loyd died fighting Kenpachi Zaraki after assuming his form for a duel, Royd posed as Yhwach and defeated Kenpachi before distracting Yamamoto while the real Yhwach was meeting Aizen. Once fulfilling his role in weakening Yamamoto for him while receiving mortal wounds, Royd is killed off by Yhwach.

Royd is voiced by Yusuke Kobayashi in the original Japanese anime and by Robbie Daymond in the English dub with Royd's Yhwach impersonation being provided by Richard Epcar.

====== Z: Giselle Gewelle ======
Giselle Gewelle (ジゼル・ジュエル, Jizeru Jueru) is a happy-go-lucky but perverse Sternritter who has the epithet "Z" for "The Zombie" (死者(ザ・ゾンビ), Za Zonbi; Japanese for "Deceased"), the ability to turn living beings touched by her blood into corpse-like slaves, depending on the afflicted's spiritual pressure, restore severed limbs, or heal herself by drinking her zombies' blood. During the Wandenreich's second invasion, Giselle, alongside Candice, Liltotto, and Meninas kill off Bambietta after her defeat by Komamura, stating that she would not like seeing their side lose Bambietta as she converts the deceased comrade into her personal zombie enforcer. After the female Sternritters attack Kenpachi in his weakened state, Giselle goads several Soul Reaper reinforcements into cutting her so they would kill themselves at her command. However, after Yumichika sees through both Giselle's method of attack and accuses her of being a man, Giselle summons the zombified Bambietta to have her kill Yumichika and Ikkaku. However, Giselle ends up facing Mayuri as her zombified Soul Reapers face the Soul Reaper captain's personal army of revived Arrancar. Once Bambietta is defeated by Charlotte Chuhlhourne, Giselle reveals that she used her ability to place Hitsugaya, Rangiku, Rose, and Kensei under her control. However, after studying Giselle's power, Mayuri devised a serum to alter the blood in zombified Soul Reapers and make them into his own personal servants before having Kensei stab her. She is shown to have survived the ordeal by drinking Bambietta's blood and has her power extracted by Yhwach's Auswählen. Hurt by Yhwach's betrayal, Giselle joins forces with Bazz-B to ally themselves with the Soul Reapers in entering the Royal Realm to kill their former master. Though she and Liltotto reach Yhwach, they were overpowered and defeated.

Giselle is voiced in the original Japanese anime by Nao Tōyama and by Casey Mongillo in the English dub.

====== Σ: Shaz Domino ======
Shaz Domino (シャズ・ドミノ, Shazu Domino) is Sternritter assigned with the Greek letter Sigma, whose ability to absorb surrounding Reishi with his regenerative power Stigma (聖傷(スティグマ), Sutiguma; Japanese for "Holy Scar) renders him virtually unable to be killed. Shaz was originally one of Gremmy's imagined constructs before he used Sigma, previously known as The Viability" (生存能力(ザ・バイアビリティー), Za Baiabiritī; Japanese for "Viability), to give himself a true body and freedom from Gremmy's influence. Following Head Captain Yamamoto's death, Shaz stands among the ruins of the SRDI, having already killed a number of scientists and thrown three knives into Akon's back, just as the latter manages to free Ichigo Kurosaki from the Garganta. Spotting Ichigo, whom he does not recognize, Shaz introduces himself as one of the Sternritters and ends up being attacked while attempting explain his special ability. As revealed in the "Beginning of the Revive of Tomorrow" side story in the 13 Blades fanbook, after escaping the Soul Society, Shaz participated in the Wandenreich's second invasion of the Seireitei with the intention to learn the method of creating his own Hōgyoku before being ultimately defeated by Izuru Kira.

Shaz is voiced by Shinya Takahashi in the original Japanese version of the anime.

=== Tokinada Tsunayashiro ===
Tokinada Tsunayashiro (綱彌代 時灘, Tsunayashiro Tokinada) is a member of the Tsunayashiro Clan, one of the Five Noble Houses, introduced in the Bleach: Can't Fear Your Own World light novel by Ryōgo Narita with input from Kubo. Originally a member of the furthest branch family the Tsunayashiro Clan, Tokinada got himself promoted to Head of the Family, while secretly orchestrating a rebellious campaign against Soul Society to replace the Soul King with his protégé the artificial being, Hikone Ubuginu. Tokinada is openly sadistic, and even admits that his greatest joy is watching people fall into soul-crushing despair. After learning about the "Original Sin" of the Soul Society against the Soul King, Tokinada adopted a nihilistic worldview, believing that there is no excuse for anyone not to act with complete malice in their meaningless world. His issued zanpakutō was confiscated for his transgressions, so he stole his family's ancestral zanpakutō, Enrakyōten, despite knowing it will shorten his lifespan, solely to satisfy his personal amusement. He uses this Enrakyōten to mimic the abilities of other zanpakutō, empowering other zanpakutō abilities if his Spiritual Pressure is higher than their owners, or using their abilities at his level if their Spiritual Pressure is higher than his. Tokinada was forced into marriage by his family, so he settled on marriage with a lowborn promising Soul Reaper, Kakyō, and planned on giving her great happiness only to brutally tear it away later on. As Kakyō was a very promising and talented graduate from the Shin'ō Academy, Tokinada grew to resent her even more, yet was unable to get rid of her as his family was happy at such a successful "experiment". During an altercation with a Soul Reaper, Tokinada murders them and Kakyō, claiming he was her lover and he killed them in self-defence, drawing the ire of Kakyō's best friend, Kaname Tōsen, whom he taunts about his lack of punishment due to his status. Decades later, Tokinada's family seeks to acquire Fullbringer corpses to extract the Soul King fragments inside of them, leading him to place surveillance on the Substitute Shinigami Badge given by Jūshirō Ukitake to Kūgo Ginjō, a Fullbringer and the first Substitute Shinigami, eventually turning Ginjō against Ukitake with a failed assassination attempt. Afterwards, he finds and recruits the apathetic Fullbringer Aura Michibane for his plans to replace the Soul King. With Seinosuke Yamada's assistance, they began to create the articial being Hikone Ubuginu, but it would not be able to move or speak, until Tokinada was able to retrieve Gremmy Thoumeaux's brain to use as the core for the being. During the final battle against Yhwach, Tokinada infiltrates the Soul Palace to steal Ikomikidomoe from Nimaiya, which would serve as Hikone's zanpakutō. After Yhwach's defeat, he has his family killed to take power and begin his plan. After Soul Society catches on to his ploys, several captains and lietenants, Arrancars and Quincy survivors launch a coordinated attack on his hideout. During the battle against them, Tokinada reveals the "original sin" of the Soul Society, how the Five Families dismembered the Soul King and created the Three Worlds. With the arrival of the Fullbringers and the betrayal of Aura, who has grown a motherly attachment to Hikone, Tokinada is gravely injured, but succeeds in killing Aura. He manages to escape them and attempts to activate his failsafe, a Kidō Cannon, but is swiftly stabbed in the back several times by a young girl from the Stealth Force. In his final words, he mocks everyone he wronged and dies laughing.

Tokinada is voiced by Kenjiro Tsuda in the Japanese game Bleach: Brave Souls.

=== Aura Michibane ===
Aura Michibane (道羽根 アウラ, Michibane Aura) is a Fullbringer who formed and led the "XCUTION Religious Organization", introduced in the Bleach: Can't Fear Your Own World light novel by Ryōgo Narita with input from Kubo. She is also the host of the Binding Chain (鎖結, Saketsu) of the Soul King. After her death as a Human, she resides as a Soul in Hueco Mundo alongside the Arrancar there. After her father is murdered, Aura was dying from hunger in her isolation, her Fullbringer powers first manifested and tore open the walls, allowing her to escape. However, due to her lack of attachments to any item at all, she never developed a specific Fullbring. After killing some Hollows in self-defence later in life, she is taken in and trained by a Soul Reaper named Tokinada Tsunayashiro, who secretly murdered her father on his family's orders. Under his orders, she formed the XCUTION cult, and began building his castle in the Valley of Screams. During the invasion of the Wandenreich, Tokinada granted her access to the corpses of countless Soul Reapers, Quincy, Humans, and Fullbringers that he collected, and told her to build a body for the King, using Gremmy Thoumeaux as the brain, eventually creating the articial being Hikone Ubuginu to replace the Soul King. After her cult in Karakura Town is discovered by Hisagi and Urahara, she demonstrates her Hollow-like high-speed regeneration, her basic Fullbringer abilities powered up to extreme levels. During the climax against Tokinada, she realizes she has grown to consider Hikone her own child, not Tokinada's tool to replace the Soul King and turns against him. After Tokinada mortally wounds her in front of Hikone, she dies and lives on as a soul in Hueco Mundo, accepted by Tier Harribel and Nelliel Tu Odelschwank.

She is voiced by Natsue Sasamoto in the Japanese game Bleach: Brave Souls.

=== Hikone Ubuginu ===
Hikone Ubuginu (産絹 彦禰, Ubuginu Hikone) is a genderless, artificial hybrid Soul, with the appearance of a dark-skinned, androgynous young child with red eyes and short dark hair, introduced in the Bleach: Can't Fear Your Own World light novel by Ryōgo Narita with input from Kubo. They have a very upbeat and cheerful personality, but are very obedient to their master Tokinada, and Aura, who they see as their mother. Created by Aura Michibane and Seinosuke Yamada under the orders of Tokinada Tsunayashiro, with the sole purpose of replacing the Soul King, but remaining a sentient lifeform, while doing so. They were created from the remains of hundreds of Soul Reapers, humans, Fullbringers and Quincy, with Sternritter Gremmy Thoumeaux serving as their brain and core, thus allowing them to use the capabilites of these species. The ancient zanpakutō, one of the earliest created by Nimaiya, Ikomikidomoe was stolen from him by Tokinada to serve as Hikone's zanpakutō. Ikomikidomoe contains a sealed extremely powerful and arrogant Adjuchas-class hollow, who even attempted to invade Soul Society before being defeated by Yamamoto and sealed into a zanpakutō by Nimaiya. Under Tokinada's orders, Hikone attacks Hueco Mundo to test their prowess in battle, but are beaten back by the combined efforts of Tier Harribel, Nelliel Tu Odelschwank, Grimmjow Jaegerjaquez, Liltotto Lamperd, Bambietta Basterbine and Giselle Gewelle. forcing Ikomikidomoe to take action and open a Garganta to escape. Hikone is quickly found by Hanatarō Yamada and Shūhei Hisagi, the former of whom immediately attempts to heal them, but Seinosuke Yamada stepts in and takes Hikone away. After returning to Hueco Mundo, Hikone uses the release command of Ikomikidomoe, releasing the giant hollow from the blade to fight the inhabitants again, to subjugate them for Tokinada. Joined by Fullbringers, they resist Hikone long enough, until he is called back to the Valley of Screams to Tokinada. After Tokinada's hideout is invaded by the Soul Reapers, Arrancar and Quincy, Hikone is ordered to slaughter them, eventually ending up in a duel with Kenpachi Zaraki. Pushed by Zaraki, Hikone calls Ikomikidomoe out and releases a form similar to Resurrección. Following Aura's betrayal to protect Hikone from Tokinada, Hikone fails to follow Tokinada's order to kill her or to even save her from death. After Aura's death as a human and Tokinada's demise, they are allowed to live with in Hueco Mundo, Aura's residence as a soul.

They are voiced by Ayumu Murase in the Japanese game Bleach: Brave Souls.

== Supporting characters ==
=== Soul Reapers ===
Soul Reapers are the protectors of souls, granting them access to Soul Society and keeping them safe from hollows. Many of the protagonists introduced in the series are Soul Reapers, either in profession, origin, or abilities. Each Soul Reaper possesses a zanpakutō, a sword that doubles as both a weapon and a physical manifestation of the owner's soul. Each zanpakutō has its own personality, which is at times at odds with its owner's. Though Soul Reapers make up the bulk of the characters from Soul Society that have been introduced in the series, a far greater number of souls occupy its outskirts.

=== Urahara Shop ===
The Urahara Shop (浦原商店, Urahara Shōten) is a convenience store that predominantly deals in snacks and small household goods. It also caters to a more select crowd of spiritually aware beings, providing them with merchandise it has acquired from Soul Society. Three of its regulars (owner Kisuke Urahara, Yoruichi Shihōin, and Tessai Tsukabishi) are former high-ranking Soul Reapers that are now fugitives of Soul Society.

==== Kisuke Urahara ====
Kisuke Urahara (浦原 喜助, Urahara Kisuke) is the owner of the Urahara Shop, whose habit of wearing traditional Japanese wooden sandals and a bucket hat earned him the nickname "Mr. Hat-and-Clogs" (ゲタ帽子, geta-bōshi). Kisuke is usually quite laid-back and has a jovial if not comical attitude, tendencies that tend to drive away customers. Despite his odd work ethic and personality, Kisuke is a keen intellectual with an inventive streak and an uncanny ability to discern an opponent's weaknesses and attack patterns with ease. Kisuke also leaves his store unattended for long periods of time, like when he trained Ichigo Kurosaki and his friends in the store's cave-like basement.

Kisuke is eventually revealed to be actually the former Captain of Squad 12 after being promoted from his 3rd seat in Squad 2. He also founded the Shinigami Research and Development Institute. A century ago, Kisuke caught Sousuke Aizen in the act of converting Hiyori and their fellow Soul Reapers into Hollows. Though Kisuke managed to save them by turning them into Vizards, learning that Aizen was after the Hōgyoku (崩玉; lit. "breakdown sphere") he developed, Kisuke is forced to leave the Soul Society when framed for the crime and go into hiding in the World of the Living. Though he attempted to dispose of the Hōgyoku in the gigai he developed for Rukia, Aizen obtained the sphere. Later aiding the Soul Society in their battle against Aizen by creating a Fake Karakura Town, Kisuke engages Aizen in battle and is initially defeated. However, though defeated, Kisuke placed a special kidō seal on Aizen that activated after the Hōgyoku rejected Aizen as its master.

As a former captain, he is also adept in using high-level kidō and uses a sharp tactical style of combat. His zanpakutō is a shikomizue named Benihime (紅姫; "Crimson Princess" or "Bloody Princess" in some translations). In this form it has three known special abilities: it can create a polygonal "blood mist shield" capable of blocking most attacks, a crimson-colored energy blast which is similar to a cero, and an explosion that combines volatile energy with a net. Kisuke's bankai is Kannonbiraki Benihime Aratame (観音開紅姫改メ; "Inquisition of the Crimson Princess of the Doors of Avalokiteśvara"), which takes the form of a giant doll-like woman that appears kneeling behind Urahara. According to Urahara, those afflicted having seams appear on them, his bankai has the power to restructure anything it touches and can repair, rip, or optimize a person affected by the bankai. Its powers were vaguely hinted towards when Urahara was asked to use it to help train Sado, with Urahara stating that his bankai is not fit for such a purpose. Aizen has commented on Urahara's ability, calling him the only man whose intellect exceeds his own. Kubo has commented on Urahara, saying he is based on Snufkin, whom he thought was cool.

He is voiced by Shin-ichiro Miki in the original Japanese version of the anime and by Michael Lindsay in the English dub until episode 214 where the role was recast to Doug Erholtz starting from episodes 231. He is played by Seiichi Tanabe in the live action movie.

==== Yoruichi Shihōin ====
Yoruichi Shihōin (四楓院 夜一, Shihōin Yoruichi) is an old friend of Urahara Shop owner Kisuke Urahara, and so uses it as a place of residence when she is not abroad. She is a slim, dark-skinned woman with deep-violet hair. She can also transform into a black cat and back at will (much to Ichigo Kurosaki's displeasure as she would tease him whenever she appeared nude before him in all her glory after transforming). Her cat form gives her a deep voice, which leads many characters to initially believe she is a male and thus call her "Mr. Yoruichi". Yoruichi is very easy-going and she insists that Suì-Fēng avoid formalities when speaking to her. She tends to avoid combat and will not engage her enemies unless her allies will lose without her intervention. When first introduced, she helps Ichigo and his friends infiltrate Soul Society. As the series progress, it is revealed that Yoruichi is a former captain of the 2nd Division, head of the noble Shihōin clan, and was the Commander in Chief of the Secret Mobile Corps. Therefore, she is highly knowledgeable in Soul Society's history due to her background as a leader of one of the four highest ranking noble families. According to a citation from Kisuke Urahara when he explained to Hiyori Sarugaki, any squad captain in the Gotei 13 who has had the Secret Mobile Corps under his or her control (usually 2nd Squad) will be a formidable military force in Soul Society. As Yoruichi was the leader of the Secret Mobile Corps and also a squad captain herself during the pendulum period and also a leader of a high ranking noble house, it has made her position in the Soul Society as one of the most intimidating and respected. A century before the start of the series she abandoned all of her military and noble house positions by helping Urahara, Tessai Tsukabishi, and the Vizards escape to the human world. Series creator Tite Kubo identifies Yoruichi as one of his two favorite female characters in the series (along with Rangiku Matsumoto), citing that he "has a lot of fun drawing her and creating stories with her."

Yoruichi has lived up to her former position as a captain and Commander in Chief of the Secret Mobile Corps due to her prowess throughout the series including when she immobilized the unreleased Espada Yammy Riyalgo bare-handed. While she is very skilled in all Soul Reaper tactical combat, Yoruichi has always been presented in the series as extremely powerful in hand-to-hand combat and the use of flash steps (瞬歩, shunpo), a high-speed movement ability. While the ability is common for any competent Soul Reaper, her speed movement is almost unmatched, leading her to be called the Goddess of Flash (瞬神, shunshin; English Anime: "Flash Master"). Even after a century later, Byakuya Kuchiki is still unable to surpass her speed. Yoruichi is also highly skilled in "Flash Cry" (瞬閧, shunkō), which is an advanced technique that combines hand-to-hand combat and kidō abilities. The use of shunko allows the user to fight bare-handed against any opponent's weapons without being injured. She has never been seen wielding a zanpakutō in the current or gaiden storyline, though is shown carrying a kodachi-like blade during flashbacks. She has also been shown using gauntlets and sabatons during her latest fight against Aizen, though these have been destroyed since then. Despite the fact that she is no longer the Captain of the Second Division, she does retain and use the uniform she wore at the time, which is unique for its absence of any clothing over the back or shoulders. It is explained that this is due to Yoruichi's mastery of Shunkō, which when utilized, destroys the fabric on the back and shoulders of the one using the technique. To date, only Yoruichi and Suì-Fēng have been shown to actively wear this particular uniform.

Yoruichi is voiced by Satsuki Yukino in the original Japanese version of the anime and by Wendee Lee in the English dub. Her cat form is voiced by Shirō Saitō in the original Japanese version of the anime and by Terrence Stone in the English dub.

==== Tessai Tsukabishi ====
Tessai Tsukabishi (握菱 鉄裁, Tsukabishi Tessai) is Urahara's personal assistant in both business and other matters. He is a large, muscular man with a thick mustache who is always seen wearing an apron. He is shown to have great physical strength, made apparent by his ability to smash a hollow's head to pieces with a single, open-palmed thrust. During the Turn Back the Pendulum miniseries, it is revealed that he was the captain of the Kidō Corps in Soul Society. As a result, Tessai is extremely skilled in kidō, demonstrated by his ability to use a level 99 binding spell while skipping its incantation. He has not been shown to carry a zanpakutō, but he did carry a shakujo during his time in Soul Society. For using forbidden kidō spells in aiding Kisuke Urahara in his attempts to help the visoreds, Tessai was sentenced to imprisonment by the Central 46 and was forced to flee to the human world.

Tessai is voiced by Kiyoyuki Yanada in the original Japanese version of the anime and by Michael Sorich in the English dub. In the English dub of the Thousand-Year Blood War arc, he is voiced by Aaron LaPlante.

==== Jinta Hanakari ====
Jinta Hanakari (花刈 ジン太, Hanakari Jinta) is a small, red-haired boy who is supposed to do manual labor for the shop, such as cleaning. Instead he usually slacks off and forces Ururu to do all the work. Though he frequently bullies her, he does care for Ururu as he recovers her body after she is injured by an arrancar. Though he is more knowledgeable than one might expect given his young appearance, he is still childish, calling Renji Abarai a "moocher" (居候, isōrō), and he enjoyed teasing, spitting, and drooling on Ichigo when his Chain of Fate was severed and Ichigo was becoming a hollow in an incapacitated state. Jinta seems to have a crush on Yuzu Kurosaki, calling her "The Goddess" and regarding anything she gives to him as sacred. His primary weapon is an oversized iron rod, similar to a Tetsubo, which he can use to attack.

Jinta is voiced by Takako Honda in the original Japanese version of the anime and by Cindy Robinson in the English dub with Benjamin Diskin later voicing Jinta after the time skip and by Robbie Daymond in the Thousand-Year Blood War arc.

==== Ururu Tsumugiya ====
Ururu Tsumugiya (紬屋 雨, Tsumugiya Ururu) is a meek, black-haired girl with pigtails and purplish-blue eyes who mostly does manual labor for the shop. She is 3 years older than Jinta. She uses a multi-barreled shoulder cannon as her weapon, which can turn into a rocket launcher to deal with powerful opponents. Ururu's meek attitude is somewhat at odds with her fighting ability, which is undefined, but quite high (Urahara vaguely mentions that her fighting ability is at an "anti-Soul Reaper" level). Her punches and kicks have a lethal amount of force and far surpass what is capable of most characters. She seems to respond robotically when injured or when Hollows are nearby. During such times, Ururu seems to take on a rather simplistic view of right and wrong; she considers those that cause harm (relative to her) as enemies, and believes that enemies must be eliminated.

She is voiced by Noriko Shitaya in the original Japanese version of the anime and by Wendee Lee in the English dub.

=== Vizards ===
Group image of the Vizards with Ichigo Kurosaki in the center. The Vizards, clockwise from the top center are: Shinji, Rose, Mashiro, Love, Hiyori, Lisa, Hachigen, and Kensei.

The Vizards (仮面の軍勢(ヴァイザード), Vaizādo; lit. "Masked Army"; "Visored" in Japanese media and first English release) are Soul Reapers who have obtained hollow powers via a process called "Hollowification" (虚化, horō-ka). While Ichigo's Hollowification was initially stable and naturally occurred because of his lineage, Hollowfication was a method originally used by the Soul Society before the progress was deemed too great a risk as the resulting hybrids would be uncontrollable and eventually self-destruct in the final stages of a disease resulting from the soul's instability: Soul Suicide (魂魄自殺, Konpaku Jisatsu). The group of Soul Reapers who became the Vizards were forcefully converted ages ago by Sousuke Aizen as part of an experiment prior to them forced to flee the Soul Society. Unable to return to their original forms, the Vizards were saved from Soul Suicide by Urahara stabilizing them with a vaccine created from Quincy Heilig Pfeil and Human souls. To gain access to their hollow powers, a Vizard dons a hollow mask that augments their Soul Reaper abilities with access to some of the generic hollow abilities. The Vizards have not shown any sort of hierarchy, seeming to prefer a loose-knit organization. After Aizen's defeat, many of the Vizards are allowed to return to the Soul Society.

==== Shinji Hirako ====
Shinji Hirako (平子 真子, Hirako Shinji) is the de facto leader of the Vizards and a friend of Urahara's. He is somewhat comical, adding a bit of levity to situations that are otherwise serious. He seems to like annoying his associate, Hiyori Sarugaki, which usually earns him a slap from one of her sandals. He also appears to have a history of referring to cute girls he meets as his 'first love', complete with a deadpan look on his face despite the obvious lie. In the past, Shinji was the previous captain of Squad Five, preceding his lieutenant Sousuke Aizen. But Shinji's reasons for making Aizen his right hand were out of distrust from the first time they met and kept an eye on him. But Shinji realized too late that Aizen used his own distrust against him when he was among those afflicted with hollowification. In the storyline, Shinji aids Ichigo in taming his inner hollow, later leading the other Vizards against Aizen's forces. Though Shinji tells Yamamoto that they're only helping as friends of Ichigo's and as enemies of Aizen, he is eventually reinstated as Squad Five captain as he aids in the fight against the Wandenreich.

Shinji's zanpakutō is named Sakanade (逆撫; literally "Offense", translated as "Counter Stroke"). When released by Shinji's command "collapse", five holes line the blade's length, and a large ring forms at the bottom of the hilt. The blade releases a scent that inverts and reverses the enemy's visual perception. Shinji claims that it is impossible to comprehend the attack directions, as the more experienced one is, the more one relies on instinct to fight, causing one to inevitably fall prey to Sakanade. After training more thoroughly with his zanpakutō, Shinji is even able to invert the words he says, as well as make those more susceptible to the ability Sakanade very ill. His bankai is called Sakashima Yokoshima Happo Fusagari, which distorts the perception of ally and enemy, causing those within a certain radius of Shinji to attack each other. Shinji is quite skilled with his hollow powers, using a single cero blast to easily overwhelm Grimmjow Jeagerjaques. His Hollow mask resembles a pharaoh's mask.

Shinji is voiced by Masaya Onosaka in the original Japanese version of the anime and by Roger Craig Smith in the English versions. Though in the English dub of the Thousand Year Blood War anime, the role was recast to Aleks Le.

==== Hiyori Sarugaki ====
Hiyori Sarugaki (猿柿 ひよ里, Sarugaki Hiyori) is a former lieutenant of Squad Twelve under captains Kirio Hikifune and then Kisuke Urahara, initially declining the latter as she saw the former as a motherly figure. Hiyori is a small, blonde-haired girl with a short temper and violent tendencies that include death threats and physical violence. Hiyori often attacks Shinji Hirako, regardless of his outranking her in their pre-Vizard days, usually by slapping his face with one of her sandals or using him as a human shield when necessary. Hiyori took the longest to defeat her inner Hollow out of all the Vizards. During the battle with Aizen, Hiyori was mortally wounded by Gin, but was healed by Captain Unohana in the aftermath. Hiyori still resents Soul Society for the treatment she and her fellow Vizards were given, and so she declines to return when offered the opportunity, preferring instead to stay in the Real World.

Her Hollow mask is skeletal in appearance with a large horn on the forehead and diamond-shaped markings over the eyebrows. Her zanpakutō is named Kubikiri Orochi (馘大蛇; lit. "Beheading Serpent") and is released with the command "chop cleanly" to become a large cleaver with a jagged edge.

Hiyori is voiced by Reiko Takagi in the original Japanese version of the anime. In the English dub, she is voiced by Mela Lee from episode 112 to 205, by Laura Bailey from 206 to 366 and by Anairis Quiñones in the English dub of the Thousand-Year Blood War arc.

==== Love Aikawa ====
Love Aikawa (愛川 羅武(ラブ), Aikawa Rabu) is the former captain of Squad 7. He is a tall man with a spiked afro (shaped like a normal round afro during his days as a Soul Reaper), and wears sporting sunglasses and a jogging suit. He seems to be very laid back, usually reading Weekly Shōnen Jump or some of Lisa's erotic manga in his spare time. Love's hollow mask is designed after a traditional Japanese Oni mask. Love is later shown to be quite physically strong, being able to rip a Menos Grande in half with his bare hands. Love's zanpakutō is named Tengumaru (天狗丸; lit. tengu). His shikai transforms it into a large kanabō reminiscent of a black cactus, twice the size of Love. Tengumaru has the ability to project fire from its tip.

Love is voiced by Tetsu Inada in the original Japanese version of the anime and by Travis Willingham in the English dub and by Bill Butts in the English dub of the Thousand-Year Blood War arc.

==== Kensei Muguruma ====
Kensei Muguruma (六車 拳西, Muguruma Kensei) is the previous captain of Squad Nine, bearing a 69 tattoo on his stomach that influenced Shūhei Hisagi to have one on his cheek after saving him when he was younger, and piercing on his left eyebrow. One of the first to be turned into a Vizard, Kensei's hollow mask takes on the form of what appears to be a hockey mask, with a flat surface, and six slits running down the front. In comparison with his fellow Vizards, Kensei is a much more serious character. He has a short temper and is easily irritated, particularly by Mashiro. After the events of the Fake Karakura Town battle, Kensei is reinstated as a Soul Reaper Captain. However, during the Wandenreich invasion while his wounds are tended to by Isane after his ordeal against Mask De Masculine, Kensei is killed by Gremmy Thoumeaux and brought back as a zombie by Giselle Gewelle, before Mayuri Kurosutchi usurps control over Kensei to have resume defending the Soul Society. Ten years after Yhwach's defeat, he is shown to have returned to normal.

Kensei's zanpakutō is named Tachikaze (断地風; lit. "Earth-Severing Wind") and is released with the command "Blow". His shikai shrinks it down into the form of a survival/combat knife. While in this form, Kensei demonstrates the ability to charge and fire spiritual energy from the blade. Tachikaze can also manipulate wind, as demonstrated when Kensei uses several wind blades to slice up a hollow, killing it instantly. Kensei's bankai is named Tekken Tachikaze (鐡拳・断地風; lit. "Iron Fist Earth-Severing Wind"). The combat knife transforms into two bladed, bronze knuckle-like weapons known as tiger claws in each hand that are connected by a long fabric-like material that wraps around and up his arms like bandages and form a small arc above his head. Kensei's bankai focuses all of the destructive power into the knuckles, causing whatever the knuckles are touching to be hit continuously with implosive power.

Kensei is voiced by Tomokazu Sugita in the original Japanese version of the anime and by Dave Mallow in the English dub and by Aaron LaPlante in the English dub of the Thousand-Year Blood War arc.

==== Mashiro Kuna ====
Mashiro Kuna (久南 白, Kuna Mashiro) is Kensei's former lieutenant in Squad Nine. She is a somewhat carefree-crazy girl who is prone to throwing fits for the smallest of things, such as Orihime befriending Hachi or when Kensei insisted on following his subordinates into battle. Her overall style of dress is reminiscent of the costumes worn by the tokusatsu superheroes of late 1970s Japanese television, particularly those of the Kamen Rider Series. Even her attacks are announced like a Tokusatsu superhero. She often calls Ichigo Berry-tan (or "Berry Boy" in the English manga, and "Carrot Top" in the anime), a pun on Ichigo's name ("ichigo" in Japanese also means "strawberry"). Unlike the other Vizards and Ichigo who have to undergo a type of training to control their hollows, Mashiro was able to maintain her hollow mask for fifteen hours on her first attempt to control her hollow. Mashiro's hollow power gives her exceptional physical strength as she easily decapitated several Menos Grande and the giant hollow which was brought by Wonderweiss Margera and subsequently engaged in battle with him. However, in the mid-battle with Wonderweiss Margera her mask shatters well before her time limit was up causing Kensei to intervene. Her mask resembles a grasshopper's head, another reference to Kamen Rider. Mashiro loves to engage in battle by combining her physical strength and hollow power rather than using her zanpakutō, the name of which is still unknown.

Mashiro is voiced by Akemi Kanda in the original Japanese version of the anime and by Laura Bailey in the English dub and by Jeannie Tirado in the English dub of the Thousand-Year Blood War arc.

==== Rōjūrō "Rose" Otoribashi ====
Rōjūrō Otoribashi (鳳橋 楼十郎, Ōtoribashi Rōjūrō), commonly referred to as Rose (ローズ, Rōzu), is previous captain of Squad Three prior to Kisuke's promotion to captain. He is an effeminate man with long, wavy, blond hair and a bird's beak-like Hollow mask. He seems to be interested in music, as he speaks to Love about an artist's new single and has been seen playing or tuning a guitar on several occasions. Rose appears to be one of the calmer and perhaps wiser ones amongst the group, though he becomes irritated whenever Love spoils a manga's story for him. After the events at the Fake Karakura Town, Rose returns to the Soul Society and restored to his captain status. But during the Wandenreich invasion, after being saved from Mask De Masculine by Renji and taken to be cared for by Isane, Rose is killed by Gremmy Thoumeaux and then brought back as a zombie by Giselle Gewelle. Later, Mayuri Kurotsuchi takes him over and uses him to defend the Soul Society. Ten years after Yhwach's defeat, he is shown to have returned to normal.

Rose's zanpakutō is named Kinshara (金沙羅; lit. "Gold Shala"). His shikai transforms the blade into a long, plantlike whip with a flower at its tip. Prefaced as Kinshara Eleventh Sonata (金沙羅奏曲第十一番, Kinshara Sōkyoku Daijūichiban), Kinshara's technique, Izayoi Bara (十六夜薔薇; lit. "Sixteen Day-Old Moon Rose"), causes this tip to discharge an explosion of energy. Kinshara's bankai, Kinshara Butōdan (金沙羅舞踏団; lit. "Gold Shala Dancing Troupe"), summons several figures called the "Dancers of Death". His bankai allows Rose to use music to create the illusion of physical pain (burning, drowning, etc.) as long as his opponents hear the music. But bankai is useless against opponents who are deaf or who deafen themselves.

Rose is voiced by Shouto Kashii in the original Japanese version of the anime and by Christopher Corey Smith in the English dub and by Kirk Thornton in the English dub of the Thousand-Year Blood War arc.

==== Hachigen "Hachi" Ushōda ====
Hachigen Ushōda (有昭田 鉢玄, Ushōda Hachigen), commonly referred to as Hachi (ハッチ, Hatchi), is the physically largest Vizard. He had been the Vice Kidō Captain (副鬼道長, Fuku Kidōchō) of the Kidō Corps under Tessai Tsukabishi. He specializes in kidō, and as such is always tasked with making barriers for the Vizards' use. He is skilled enough to use bakudō up to 99 without reciting their incantations. By his own admission, his powers are very similar to those of Orihime Inoue's. Despite his unusual size, Hachi is actually very kind and gentle, and seems to enjoy Orihime's company. His mask resembles a Native American tribe mask. He has been seen with a zanpakutō during Ichigo's training when the young man went berserk, he helped restrain him while also brandishing the blade at him. Later during the battle at Karakura Town, he encased it in his barrier right before confronting a horde of Gillian, however, it is uncertain what its powers are or if it is even a zanpakutō at all. He aids in Suì-Fēng's battle against Barragan and manages to ultimately defeat the Espada at the cost of his forearm.

Hachigan is voiced by Takashi Nagasako in the original Japanese version of the anime and by Joe Ochman in the English dub.

==== Lisa Yadōmaru ====
Lisa Yadōmaru (矢胴丸 リサ, Yadōmaru Risa; romanized as Risa Yadōmaru in the Japanese media) used to be Shunsui Kyōraku's lieutenant in Squad Eight, having spied on the captain's meetings and read to her successor Nanao Ise on a monthly basis; she is later allowed to return to Soul Society after the Wandenreich's invasion and is promoted to captain of Squad Eight, the seat of which has been vacant since Shunsui's promotion to captain-commander status. She is a girl with glasses and long, braided, dark hair, who dresses in a seifuku, as opposed to the more Western-style uniforms worn by the female students of Karakura High School. She seems easily irritated and apparently likes to read erotic manga. In the English translations, it has been edited to "swimsuit magazines". Her mask resembles a knight's helmet, with a cross shape opening on it. Her zanpakutō is called Haguro Tonbo (鉄漿蜻蛉; lit. "Black Dragonfly". 鉄漿 means "black tooth dye"). In its shikai form, it becomes a large guan dao or monk's spade with a fanned blade and large orb on the opposite end.

Lisa is voiced by Kanako Hatori in the original Japanese version of the anime, later by Sayori Ishizuka in the Thousand-Year Blood War arc and by Tara Platt in the English dub.

== Other characters ==
=== Modified souls ===
Noba, Kurōdo, Lirin and Kisuke Urahara

Modified souls (改造魂魄, kaizō konpaku), or Mod-Souls for short, are a variation of the gikon (義魂; Artificial Souls) created by Kirio Hikifune that Soul Reapers use as stand-ins while using gigai (義骸, artificial body) vessels to move about in the World of the Living. Unlike Gikon, given personalities and unique powers of their own, Mod-Souls are produced in the Soul Society's Project Spearhead (尖兵計画, sempei keikaku; "Vanguard Plan") to assist in the combat against Hollows by reanimating corpses. However, this act was deemed immoral and Project Spearhead was disbanded with all Mod-Souls seemingly deposed of.

With Kon one of the surviving Mod-Souls, four other Mod-Souls have been introduced in the anime series. Like Kon, three Mod-Souls created by Kisuke typically inhabits a plushie with all of their abilities intact (albeit scaled down to fit their size). But all four anime-exclusive Mod-Souls possess their own personal gigai they can use to avoid attention with complete use of their abilities.

==== Kon ====
Kon (コン) is the first Mod-Soul to appear in Bleach, designated an Underpod (部下強化型(アンダーポッド), Andāpoddo; Japanese for "Lower Part-Strengthened Form") model with strong leg strength. By chance, Kon ended up living with Ichigo when he was placed in a container of Gikon that Rukia bought for Ichigo to use. Kon primarily serves as a comedic foil in the series, receiving little respect and much disdain from other characters. He is not completely undeserving of this treatment as he is highly perverted in nature; he is drawn to girls with big breasts (and displays attraction towards Rukia despite her lack thereof, but more because he believes she saved his life) and, when inhabiting another's body, spends his time trying to look up skirts since "it will not be [his] reputation that gets sullied". However, from the beginning he displayed a much more serious side to himself, believing that life should not be taken on purpose after he witnessed the destruction of other Mod-Souls. Kon's area of expertise are his legs, and thus he can run faster and jump higher than any human, even in his plush form. He typically inhabits a lion plushie that he is very fond of, referring to it as his "sexy body". Kon also inhabits Ichigo Kurosaki's body whenever he is away, playing the part of Ichigo so that his family does not miss him. Although Kon makes only sporadic appearances in the Bleach storyline, he frequently hosts and/or stars in omake specials for the series including his talk show Radio Kon Baby, self-proclaiming himself as the series' mascot.

He is voiced by Mitsuaki Madono in the original Japanese version of the anime and by Quinton Flynn in the English dub.

==== Kurōdo ====
Kurōdo (蔵人) is a somewhat cowardly Mod-Soul with the ability to shapeshift. He replicates the ability of others when he does so (although he cannot replicate the potency of said abilities). His plushie body is a rabbit-like purse. Kurōdo's gigai is of a bespectacled man with a mustache and two-tone hair color (black to the left, blonde to the right). He wears a gray top hat, multi-colored suit, and tie, as well as dark brown boots. He is often told he talks too much.

Kurōdo is voiced by Nobuo Tobita in the original Japanese version of the anime and by Michael McConnohie in the English dub.

==== Noba ====
Noba (之芭) is very quiet, rarely speaking more than a few words. He is fairly shy, hiding his face when he wishes to show no emotion. Despite this, he is somewhat analytical and adept at strategic combat. Noba has the power to teleport himself and others to almost any location he has been to, using inter-dimensional portals. The dimension inside the portals appears to be red. He can also create wormholes to redirect ranged attacks, both physical and energy-based, back at the enemy. Noba's plushie body is an anthropomorphic turtle in gray dress trousers and a white ruffled shirt with a red bow tie. He retreats into his shell when embarrassed or feeling shy. His gigai is of a young slim built, red-haired man with aqua eyes wearing a ninja-esque outfit: a fur coat with a shield on his back and a zippered mask.

Noba is voiced by Tomokazu Sugita in the original Japanese anime and by Roger Craig Smith in the English dub.

==== Ririn ====
Lirin (りりん, Ririn) acts as the leader of the Mod-Souls introduced in the Bount arc. At times she is petty and arrogant, resulting in her initial dislike of Ichigo Kurosaki. She can sense Bount reishi, along with their dolls. Other times she shows real concern for others, eventually developing a fondness for Ichigo where she will put herself in harm's way to protect him. She often looks down on Kon as inferior, which causes frequent arguments between the two. Her special ability is the creation of illusions. Lirin's plushie body is an anthropomorphic bird that wears a blue coat, red bow, and blue boots. She does not like the plushie at all and claims that she cannot change to another. Lirin's gigai is a small girl with short blonde hair wearing a pink, fur-trimmed coat, a purple bird-shaped cape, and red boots. She, Kurōdo and Noba all live at Urahara's shop while not in action.

Lirin is voiced by Yumi Kakazu in the original Japanese anime and by Julie Ann Taylor in the English dub.

==== Nozomi Kujō ====
Nozomi Kujō (九条 望実, Kujō Nozomi) is a Mod-Soul. She has escaped from the Soul Society and is wanted by Kagerōza Inaba. She is actually the result of Project Spearhead, the experiment that created the first Mod-Soul in the image of its overseer Ōko Yushima. In truth, having a grudge against the Soul Society yet needing a stronger body to best use his power without residual side effects, Yushima transferred his consciousness into a Mod-Soul that he splintered into two to conceal his presence: One half becoming Nozomi who embodies Yushima's restraint and the other bearing his rage and personality that became Kagerōza. Ending up in Karakura Town while evading the Reigai, Mod-Soul based clones of Soul Reapers created by Kagerōza, Nozomi is found by Kon and befriends Ichigo and his friends as they protect her. In the process, having intending to destroy herself to keep Kagerōza from fulfilling his goal, she manages to open up and show off her exuberant personality while manifesting her own zanpakutō Arazome Shigure (退紅時雨, Faded Scarlet Late Autumn Shower) which can absorb spirit pressure in its released state. Eventually, Nozomi is captured and Kagerōza proceeds to use his lab equipment to absorb her and assume his true form as Yushima. However, Nozomi's conscious is able to endure and fight Yushima as he battles her friends. Though she managed to separate from him, Nozomi dies from the internal wounds she inflicted on Yushima while she was still a part of him.

Nozomi is voiced by Hisako Kanemoto in the original Japanese anime and by Julie Ann Taylor in the English dub

=== Kurosaki family ===
==== Isshin Kurosaki ====
Isshin Kurosaki (黒崎 一心, Kurosaki Isshin) is, at the beginning of the series, the unassuming father of Ichigo, Karin and Yuzu, and the head of the family. Later on in the series, it is revealed that their father was in fact formerly a Shinigami and captain of the 10th Division, making him the predecessor of its current leader, Tōshirō Hitsugaya. Forced to abscond his duties as a Shinigami after sacrificing his powers to save the life of his eventual wife, Masaki, Isshin opened the Kurosaki Clinic in the Human World, living a simple family life in Karakura Town. He adopted the surname of his wife, Kurosaki, but was originally a member of the Shiba clan, making him relatives of Ganju, Kūkaku and Kaien Shiba. The goofy, energetic, and fun-loving demeanor he typically presents belies his discerning eye and wisdom, which his eldest son, Ichigo, has been able to rely on at points in the series.

Isshin is voiced by Toshiyuki Morikawa in the original Japanese version of the anime and by Patrick Seitz in the English dub. Isshin is played by Yōsuke Eguchi in the live-action film while Keith Silverstein voices him in the English dub of the live-action film.

==== Karin Kurosaki and Yuzu Kurosaki ====
Karin Kurosaki (黒崎 夏梨, Kurosaki Karin) and Yuzu Kurosaki (黒崎 遊子, Kurosaki Yuzu), are Ichigo's younger sisters. While Karin is typically cynical and sarcastic with the ability to see spirits, Yuzu is more soft-spoken, empathetic and emotional. When Ichigo loses his powers after defeating Aizen, beginning her first year of high school with Yuzu, Karin took a more active role in seeing and interacting with ghosts.

Karin is voiced by Rie Kugimiya in the original Japanese version of the anime and by Kate Higgins in the English dub. In the live-action movie, she is played by Miyu Ando.

Yuzu is voiced by Ayumi Sena in the original Japanese version of the anime and by Janice Kawaye in the English dub. In the live-action film, she is played by Kokoro Hirosawa.

In the English dub of the live-action film, both of them are voiced by Janice Kawaye.

==== Kazui Kurosaki ====
Kazui Kurosaki (黒崎 一勇, Kurosaki Kazui) is the son of Ichigo and Orihime, who possess Shinigami powers. His face closely resembles that of his mother's, having the same shaped eyes and facial curves, while he inherited his father's bright orange hair, though his hair is noticeably smoother than Ichigo's. Kazui is adventurous, regularly making uninvited appearances in Hiyori Sarugaki's home and freely interacting with remnants of Yhwach's Reiatsu.

Kazui is voiced by Azusa Tachibana in the Japanese version of the anime.

==== Masaki Kurosaki ====
Masaki Kurosaki (黒崎 真咲, Kurosaki Masaki) was the wife of Isshin Shiba, and the mother of Ichigo, Karin and Yuzu, as well as the last of the Kurosaki bloodline who was taken in by the Ishida family with the plan that she would marry Ryūken to continue the Quincies' existence as pure-bloods. However, after being infected by the artificial Hollow White, Masaki instead married Isshin after using a method to repress the hollow influence that required Isshin to have his Soul Reaper powers sealed. She was killed by the Hollow Grand Fisher while protecting Ichigo. It is revealed that when Masaki and Ichigo encountered Grand Fisher, Yhwach's Auswählen caused Masaki to lose her Quincy power, rendering her unable to fight against Grand Fisher.

Masaki is voiced by Sayaka Ohara in the original Japanese version of the anime and by Ellyn Stern in the English dub. In the backstory episodes from Thousand-Year Blood War anime dub, Masaki's voice has been provided by Cherami Leigh. Masaki is played by Masami Nagasawa in the live-action film.

=== Karakura Town inhabitants ===
The following are inhabitants of Karakura Town:

==== Keigo Asano ====
Keigo Asano (浅野 啓吾, Asano Keigo) is a classmate and friend of Ichigo Kurosaki. He is an extremely hyperactive character and often uses overly dramatic movements and words to act out his feelings.

Keigo is voiced by Katsuyuki Konishi in the original Japanese version of the anime and by Yuri Lowenthal in the English dub. In the live-action film, he is played by Hiroto Yamada while Kaiji Tang voices him in the English dub of the live-action film.

==== Tatsuki Arisawa ====
Tatsuki Arisawa (有沢 竜貴, Arisawa Tatsuki) is a good childhood friend of Ichigo Kurosaki and the best friend of Orihime Inoue. She has known both since she was young, sparring with Ichigo in their karate classes and defending Orihime whenever people picked on or bothered her.

Tatsuki is voiced by Junko Noda in the original Japanese version of the anime and by Wendee Lee in the English dub. In the live-action film, she is played by Risako Itō while Erika Ishii voices her in the English dub of the live-action film.

==== Mizuiro Kojima ====
Mizuiro Kojima (小島 水色, Kojima Mizuiro) is a classmate and friend of Ichigo Kurosaki. He has a boyish face and gentle manner of speaking, with a marked fondness for older women. He is shown to be spiritually aware but has yet to display any unique abilities.

Mizuiro is voiced by Jun Fukuyama in the original Japanese version of the anime. In the English dub, he is voiced Tom Fahn from episodes 2-366 and by Jamie Simone in episodes 380-Present.

==== Chizuru Honshō ====
Chizuru Honshō (本匠 千鶴, Honshō Chizuru) is a classmate of Ichigo Kurosaki. She is an open lesbian and is often trying to get close to Orihime and touch her large breasts only to be thwarted by Tatsuki who would often attack her.

Chizuru is voiced by Saki Nakajima in the original Japanese version of the anime and by Jeannie Elias in the English dub.

==== Misato Ochi ====
Misato Ochi (越智美諭, Ochi Misato) is a teacher at Kakaura High School who has Ichigo and his friends as students. While she can be easygoing, Misato does have her strict moments as seen when she makes Ichigo do multiple exams to make up for his unexplained absences.

Misato is voiced by Hitomi Nabatame in the original Japanese version of the anime and by Dorothy Elias-Fahn in the English dub.

==== Kagine ====
Kagine (鍵根, Kagine-sensei) is a strict gym teacher at Karakura High School who can be easily angered. Though he can be fooled by acts of tears as seen when Rukia pretends to be sad in order to deflect the blame from the Don Kannoji incident.

Kagine is voiced by Kazuhiro Nakata in the original Japanese version of the anime and by Richard Epcar in the English dub.

==== Ikumi Unagiya ====
Ikumi Unagiya (鰻屋 育美, Unagiya Ikumi) is the owner and manager of the Unagiya Shop (a business which performs a variety of odd jobs for its customers) in Karakura Town and the mother of Kaoru Unagiya. She hires Ichigo Kurosaki sometime after the loss of his Shinigami powers. Ikumi is shown to have good fighting skills as seen when she had to beat up the punks that were making Ichigo late to work.

She is voiced by Yūko Kaida in the original Japanese version of the anime and by Mary Elizabeth McGlynn in the English dub.

==== Kaoru Unagiya ====
Kaoru Unagiya (鰻屋 馨, Unagiya Kaoru) is the young son of Ikumi Unagiya. Kaoru is fairly petulant, though he tends to be over-protective of his mother. As a result, Kaoru is distrustful of other males who come near her warning them not to ingratiate themselves with her.

He is voiced by Kaoru Mizuhara in the original Japanese version of the anime and by Yuri Lowenthal in the English dub.

=== Soul Society inhabitants ===
==== Shiba Clan ====
The Shiba Clan are Isshin's family who are based in the Soul Society as its fifth noble family with prestige compared to the Kuchiki and Shihōin families. But after the death of Kaien Shiba, the Shiba Clan fell from their high-status position prior to the events of the series and make a living as fireworks specialists in the outskirts of the Soul Society. Isshin Kurosaki was originally a member of the Shiba clan, making him relatives of Ganju, Kūkaku and Kaien Shiba but how exactly is unknown.

===== Kūkaku Shiba =====
Kūkaku Shiba (志波 空鶴, Shiba Kūkaku) is a fireworks expert, the younger sister of Kaien and the older sister of Ganju. She lives with her family in themed houses (which she changes in design and location regularly) on the outskirts of Soul Society. For some unknown reason, Kūkaku is missing her right arm which in the anime is replaced with a prosthetic. Kūkaku is the head of the Shiba family after Kaien died. Because they knew only that Kaien was killed by a Soul Reaper, both Kūkaku and Ganju are distrustful of Soul Reapers when first introduced. After Kaien's killer Rukia Kuchiki explains how he died and apologizes, the Shibas make amends. Kūkaku seems to have some kind of relationship with the Urahara Shop, knowing Yoruichi Shihōin and claiming to have worked with Kisuke Urahara in the past. She can perform high level kidō spells, and carries a kodachi tied around the remaining portion of her right arm. Kūkaku's firework cannon is capable of breaching through high concentrations of reiatsu, which is used by Ichigo's group to cross over to Seireitei and much later to transport Ichigo and the Royal Guards toward the Royal Palace, is one of the few ways to do so. She mentions having to let Ichigo enter the Royal Palace even if it saddens "uncle" before commanding her brother to train with the deceased Xcution members in preparation for the Wandenreich's second invasion.

She is voiced by Akiko Hiramatsu in the original Japanese version of the anime and by Cindy Robinson in the English dub.

===== Ganju Shiba =====
Ganju Shiba (志波 岩鷲, Shiba Ganju) is Kaien and Kūkaku's younger brother. He is the leader of a gang, who all ride large boars. Incidentally, Ganju's boar, Bonnie-chan, met her end in a nabe which Ganju himself was invited to by 4th squad captain Unohana. Ganju possesses a hot temper and a strong ego, though has shown a softer side, easily being cowed by his older sister, Kūkaku. He and his sister initially hate Soul Reapers due to the death of their brother, Kaien, though after his interactions with Ichigo Kurosaki he overcomes this. Ganju is not particularly attractive, something that has become a running joke in the series. He has a dagger which resembles a meat cleaver or a Chinese Dadao, though his skills are limited and he instead relies on his arsenal of fireworks and his earth magic. Ganju's earth magic does not seem to operate on the same principles as standard Soul Reaper kidō spells; the one technique he uses can reduce whatever earth it is aimed to sand or quicksand, useful when making holes in walls to escape pursuers. Ganju participates with Ichigo's group in entering Seireitei with the intent to understand what made his late brother never hate Soul Reaper to the very end even after being killed by one. He later confronted his brother's killer, Rukia, and while at first resentful, he eventually forgave her after learning the truth behind Kaien's death from Ukitake. During the Wandenreich's attack on Soul Society, he also participates with Ichigo, Orihime, Chad, and Yoruichi to face Yhwach in the Royal Realm.

He is voiced by Wataru Takagi in the original Japanese version of the anime and by Kyle Hebert in the English dub.

==== Kasumiōji Clan ====
The Kasumiōji Clan (霞大路家, Kasumiōjika) is a high-ranking noble family who are expert sword makers that appear in the Kasumiōji Conspiracy arc. They make use of different assassins that make up their bodyguards. Nobody knew it yet, but some of its members were responsible for the secret production of the Bakkōtō which is a rare weapon that Rukia Kuchiki considered illegal.

===== Lurichiyo Kasumiōji =====
Lurichiyo Kasumiōji (霞大路 瑠璃千代, Kasumiōji Rurichiyo) is the heir to the Soul Society's Kasumiōji Clan and was a central figure to the Kasumiōji Conspiracy. Her mother died giving birth to her and her father died of an illness. She was targeted by Gyōkaku Kumoi, his assassins, and their silent partner Shūsuke Amagai as part of their plot to dispose of Lurichiyo and obtain leadership over the Kasumiōji Clan by using the Bakkōtō. With the help of Ichigo Kurosaki and Rukia Kuchiki, Amagai was defeated with those involved in the plot ending up either killed in action or incarcerated. Afterward, Lurichiyo was engaged to Shū and assumed leadership over the Kasumiōji Clan.

Lurichiyo Kasumiōji is voiced by Reiki Takagi in the original Japanese version of the anime and by Eden Riegel in the English dub.

====== Ryūsei Kenzaki ======
Ryūsei Kenzaki (犬崎劉聖, Kenzaki Ryūsei) is a Shinigami servant of Lurichiyo Kasumiōji. He is also nicknamed Kenryū (犬龍, Kenryū) by Lurichiyo and asks her spokesperson. Ryūsei wields the Zanpakutō Benishidare which enables him to emit blooming flowers that emit pollen.

Ryūsei Kenzaki is voiced by Hiroki Takahashi in the original Japanese version of the anime and by Roger Craig Smith in the English dub.

====== Rusaburō Enkōgawa ======
Rusaburō Enkōgawa (猿猴川流三郎, Enkōgawa Rusaburō) is a muscular Shinigami bodyguard of Lurichiyo Kasumiōji who is very conscious about his high-pitched voice and mostly uses sign language. He is also nicknamed Enryū (猿龍, Enryū) by Lurichiyo. Rusaburō wields the Zanpakutō Daichimaru that transform into two large fists attached to chains.

Rusaburō Enkōgawa is voiced by Ryōtarō Okiayu in the original Japanese version of the anime and by Neil Kaplan in the English dub.

===== Shū Kannogi =====
Shū Kannogi (菅ノ木 愁, Kannogi Shū) is a young boy who is the fiancé of Lurichiyo Kasumiōji.

Shū Kannogi is voiced by Tsubasa Yanaga in the original Japanese version of the anime and by Brianne Siddall in the English dub.

===== Gyōkaku Kumoi =====
Gyōkaku Kumoi (雲井 尭覚, Kumoi Gyōkaku) is the elderly steward of the Kasumiōji Clan. He was behind the manufacturing of the Bakkōtō as part of the Kasumiōji Conspiracy who hides his corruption behind a benevolent personality. Because Yamamoto was forbidden from investigating the Kasumiōji Clan's Bakkōtō manufacturing by Central 46, Shin'etsu Kisaragi volunteered to do it for him. He was caught and Kumoi had him used as a test subject for a Bakkōtō that ended with Yamamoto killing him in self-defense. Wanting to take the position as head of the Kasumiōji Clan, Kumoi has sent different assassins after her. After Yamamoto was provided evidence of the Bakkōtō that led to a Gotei 13 invasion on the Kasumiōji Compound, Ichigo, Rukia, and Shū Kannogi demanded the Kumoi surrender Lurichiyo only for Kumoi to be killed by Shusuke Amagai who Kumoi was actually working for.

Gyōkaku Kumoi is voiced by Masaharu Satō in the original Japanese version of the anime and by Kirk Thornton in the English dub.

===== Hanza Nukui =====
Hanza Nukui (貫井 半左, Nukui Hanza) is the leader of the assassins that work for Gyōkaku Kumoi. He wields the Bakkōtō Saiga which resembles a katana with a mirror on its hilt. During his fight with Ichigo, Hanza was overcome by Saiga causing it and Hanza to explode.

Hanza Nukui is voiced by Yoshikazu Nagano in the original Japanese version of the anime and by Tony Oliver in the English dub.

===== Jinnai Dōko =====
Jinnai Dōko (銅虎陣内, Dōko Jinnai) is a member of the assassins that work for Gyōkaku Kumoi who possesses square teeth and pink skin. He wields the Bakkōtō Retsurai which resembles a jagged scythe and can enable Jinnai to become jagged upon eating parts of it. During his fight with Rukia, Jinnai got absorbed into Retsurai which was snatched by Nukui's men.

Jinnai Dōko is voiced by Jin Domon in the original Japanese version of the anime and by Spike Spencer in the English dub.

===== Kuzuryū =====
Kuzuryū (九頭竜, Kuzuryū) is a member of the assassins that work for Gyōkaku Kumoi. He wields the Bakkōtō Shiragiri that resembles a segmented eyeless fish with a katana blade from between the two sides of the dorsal fin which also grants him the ability to use mist-based abilities. After surviving Uryū's attack, Kuzuryū returns to the Kasumiōji Compound to inform Kumoi about the deaths of his fellow assassins. Upon being told by Kumoi that he has no further use of him, Kuzuryū tries to attack him only to be killed by Makoto Kibune.

Kuzuryū is voiced by Hikaru Hanada in the original Japanese version of the anime and by Joe Ochman in the English dub.

===== Genga =====
Genga (厳牙, Genga) is a member of the assassins that work for Gyōkaku Kumoi. He wields the Bakkōtō Kakuyoku which can slash the air and the ground. He is killed by Chad's Brazo Izquierda del Diablo.

Genga is voiced by Daisuke Matsuoka in the original Japanese version and by Adam Bitterman in the English dub.

==== Yūshirō Shihōin ====
Yūshirō Sakimune Shihōin (四楓院 夕四郎 咲宗, Shihōin Yūshirō Sakimune) is the 23rd head of the Shihōin Clan and the guardian of its sacred armor, after the previous head, Yoruichi was exiled from Soul Society. He is Yoruichi's eager and naive younger brother and a skilled Shunko wielder, who joins the final battle against Yhwach's Schutzstaffel. He fights Askin Nakk Le Vaar alongside his sister, but is grievously wounded and incapacitated, until Askin's defeat, when all participants are rescued by Nelliel.

He is voiced by Hiromi Igarashi in the original Japanese version and by Zeno Robinson in the English dub.

==== Ichika Abarai ====
Ichika Abarai (阿散井 苺花, Abarai Ichika) is the young daughter of Squad Six lieutenant Renji Abarai and Squad Thirteen captain Rukia Kuchiki, who servers as a Soul Reaper cadet ten years after Yhwach's defeat. She is a young and cheerful child who befriended Kazui Kurosaki as well.

She is voiced by Ayaka Ōhashi in the original Japanese version of the anime.

=== Quincy ===
Quincy (滅却師(クインシー), Kuinshī) are a clan of humans who are descended from Yhwach. Spiritually aware because of Yhwach's blood running through them, the Quincies can reshape spiritual particles into various types of bow and arrows, swords or explosives. There are also Quincies that are born once every two centuries with same power as Yhwach himself. At their height, Quincies used their powers to combat the hollows to protect the land of the living with a greater success rate than the Soul Reapers. However, unlike the Soul Reapers who purify Hollows, Quincies completely destroy the soul and thus create an imbalance between the life and death that would threaten to destroy the world. As a last resort to prevent further imbalance, the Soul Reapers exterminated most of the Quincies with only a few traces remains allowed to live. As a result, having great animosity towards Soul Reapers, some Quincies marry into normal human families with their children becoming Impure Quincies while some Quincy families attempt to keep their bloodline pure. Tite Kubo created the Quincy as rivals to the Soul Reapers, resulting in long-range weapons as a counter to the standard Soul Reaper zanpakuto and white clothing as an antithesis to the black Soul Reaper uniform. Their name stems from their symbol, a five-pointed star, and the prefix "quin," meaning "five," as well as Kubo's liking for the phrase "Quincy archer." Other than Uryū Ishida and the Wandenreich, there are some other Quincies who had survived the genocide.

==== Ryūken Ishida ====
Ryūken Ishida (石田 竜弦, Ishida Ryūken; romanized as "Ryūgen" in Bleach Official Character Book SOULs and other Japanese sources) is Uryū's father who works as the Hospital Director of Karakura Hospital. Ryūken is portrayed as a bitter and cold Quincy who detests his own people though he is extremely powerful and possesses many of their people's lost or stolen artifacts (some of the new weapons that Ishida currently uses are "borrowed" from his father). It is revealed that he was meant to marry Masaki Kurosaki, a distant relative of his, to preserve the blood purity of the Quincy. However, his engagement fell through when Masaki underwent Hollowfication and Isshin Shiba tied his life with Masaki's in order to save it. Instead of Masaki, he married his family maid, Kanae Katagiri. Nine years before the main story, Kanae was subjected to the Auswählen and eventually died, impacting Ryūken and causing him to detest Quincy. After his wife's death, he performed a long-term autopsy on her body in order to retrieve a special silver cloth created from Auswählen and used it to make an arrow that can stop Yhwach's power.

Ryūken is voiced by Ken Narita in the original Japanese version of the anime and by Michael McConnohie in the English dub of the original anime, Christopher Swindle takes over the role in the Thousand-Year Blood War arc.

==== Sōken Ishida ====
Sōken Ishida (石田 宗弦, Ishida Sōken) was the father of Ryūken and the grandfather of Uryū. He trained Uryū in Quincy abilities throughout his childhood, becoming his mentor in the process. Sōken tried to make amends with Soul Reapers by advocating a new system of response to Hollow attacks. His proposal was never accepted, and he was eventually killed in a Hollow attack due to his old age (with Mayuri Kurotsuchi being responsible for not sending Soul Reapers to save him).

Sōken is voiced by Eiji Maruyama in the original Japanese version of the anime and by Akio Nojima in the Thousand-Year Blood War arc, and by David Lodge in the English dub.

==== Izumi Ishida ====
Izumi Ishida (石田 依澄, Ishida Izumi) was an Echt Quincy as well as the wife of Sōken Ishida, the mother of Ryūken Ishida and the grandmother of Uryū Ishida. She was a stern matriarch who took the fate of the pure-blooded Quincy bloodlines seriously, having offered asylum to her orphaned relative Masaki Kurosaki, to later wed her to her son.

Izumi is voiced by Rei Igarashi in the Japanese version of the anime and by Karen Strassman in the English dub.

==== Kanae Ishida (nee Katagiri) ====
Kanae Katagiri (片桐 叶絵, Katagiri Kanae) was the wife of Ryūken Ishida and the mother of Uryū. She is of a mixed-blood heritage (Gemischt) and originally worked as the maid of the Ishida family. She befriended Ryūken since they were children and eventually developed a crush on him, although she is aware that Ryūken must marry his distant relative, Masaki Kurosaki. After Ryūken's engagement with Masaki fell through, she comforted a weeping Ryūken and eventually married him, giving birth to Uryū. However, nine years before the main story, the Quincy progenitor, Yhwach initiated the Auswählen: the process to absorb the power of impure Quincy, which took the powers of both Kanae and Masaki. Kanae, who was already weak at the time, eventually died three months later.

Kanae is voiced by Mamiko Noto in the original Japanese anime and by Megan Hollingshead in the English dub.

=== Zanpakutō Spirits ===
The Zanpakutō (斬魄刀; "Souls-Cutter Sword") are the main weapons of Soul Reapers, conceived and invented by Ōetsu Nimaiya of Squad Zero. When first created, a nameless zanpakutō is initially known as an asauchi (浅打; "Shallow Hit) and is given to low-class Soul Reapers. Over time, from imprinting the owner's soul into it, the asauchi eventually transforms into the Soul Reaper's personal zanpakutō. As a consequence, having been a formless entity prior, the spiritual embodiment of a zanpakutō gains a unique appearance. While each one's appearance is reflection of the owner's spirit pressure, zanpakutō spirits have an additional form during the bankai state of a zanpakutō. Though they would test their owners' worth in using them, zanpakutō spirits exist to protect their wielder and would eventually cease to be if the Soul Reaper who owns them dies or uses a technique that would render the user powerless. There are few exceptions to the rule such as in the case of the Ise Clan's zanpakutō Shinken Hakkyōken, which can be passed down the generations as a family heirloom. During the Zanpakutō Rebellion and Beast Swords arc, the zanpakutō spirits were given a true presence by the power of the unique zanpakutō Muramasa. However, by the end of the Beast Swords arc, weeks after his death, Muramasa's power waned and the zanpakutō spirits return to their original states.

==== Zangetsu ====
Zangetsu (斬月; Slaying Moon), also simply called "Old Man Zangetsu" by Ichigo, is the manifestation of Ichigo's Quincy powers, who appears as a tall man with ragged black hair, facial hair, and sunglasses. This appearance is supposed to represent Yhwach, the first Quincy, 1,000 years before the start of the series when he fought Yamamoto. Pretending to be Ichigo's actual Zanpakutō, Old Man Zangetsu aided Ichigo in achieving his potential as a Soul Reaper. However, while attempting to tame his Inner Hollow, Ichigo hears his opponent introducing himself as Zangetsu.

The reason for this is revealed when Tensa Zangetsu (天鎖斬月; Heaven Chain Slaying Moon), a younger and more powerful version of Zangetsu that Ichigo encounters while in his bankai state, reveals that he and Ichigo's Hollow are both halves of the same being that represents Ichigo's overall power. After he and Ichigo's Hollow assumed their true form, Tensa Zangetsu battles Ichigo to test his resolve in using the Final Getsuga Tenshō. Though Ichigo passed his test, Tensa Zangetsu reveals the consequences of the attack before bidding his owner farewell. Ichigo would learn that the Zangetsu he knew was actually the personification of his powers as a Quincy, therefore resembling a younger Yhwach. Confronted by Ichigo about this, confirming what the youth learned about him, Zangetsu reveals he had kept Ichigo's full power as a Soul Reaper in check because he initially didn't want Ichigo to become Soul Reaper out of concern for his safety. As they fought together, however, Zangetsu's determination waver and he finally decide to unlock the youth's full potential in light of Yhwach's return. After True Zangetsu is reforged, his essence resides in the smallest of the split blades in his True Shikai state.

Zangetsu is voiced by Takayuki Sugō in the original Japanese version of the anime and by Richard Epcar in the English dub.

Tensa Zangetsu is voiced by Showtaro Morikubo in the original Japanese version of the anime and by Keith Silverstein in the English version.

==== Hollow Ichigo ====
Hollow Ichigo is the True Zangetsu and the manifestation of Ichigo's True Zanpakuto. He was born from the result of Ichigo's mother being infected by trace remains of the Hollow White that passed on to Ichigo and fused with Ichigo's latent Soul Reaper powers, which manifested when Ichigo awakened as a Soul Reaper. In appearance both normally and when in bankai state, Hollow Ichigo is identical to his host save for his white eyes (golden in anime), opposite colour scheme and permanent grin. Prior to his full awakening, Hollow Ichigo manifested himself as a Hollow Mask that continuously appeared and shielded Ichigo from what would have been a fatal attack. After Ichigo is aware of his existence, he is eventually able to fully manifest himself by possessing Ichigo's body during his fights. Whenever possessing Ichigo's body, a Hollow Mask resembling a white skull with red markings would form on Ichigo's face as Ichigo slowly undergoes Hollowfication. Though a bloodthirsty berserker who would taunt and take any chance to take over Ichigo's body, Hollow Ichigo's nature as a true zanpakutō compels him to intervene during some of Ichigo's fights to protect his wielder by the means of Hollowfication. After his identity is fully revealed, it is explained that everything that Hollow Ichigo did was actually for the sake of making Ichigo stronger and properly utilize his power. After Ichigo's True Zanpakuto is reforged, Hollow Ichigo's essence resides in the largest aspect of the split true shikai state of his true zanpakutō.

Hollow Ichigo is voiced by Masakazu Morita in the original Japanese version of the anime and by Johnny Yong Bosch in the English dub.

==== Zabimaru ====
Zabimaru (蛇尾; Snake Tail) is the Zanpakutō owned by Renji Abarai. It appears as a Nue, first seen in the Soul Society arc when Renji was recovering from his first fight with Ichigo. In the anime exclusive Zanpakutō Rebellion arc, Zabimaru's form changes to that of a green monkey-fur woman and a young boy with a snake tail. Though the two are normally connected by a chain, with the child assuming their zanpakutō form for his older counterpart to wield, the two halves of Zabimaru act independent of each other when needed to.

In the original Japanese version of the anime, the original form of Zabimaru is voiced by Tōru Furusawa, Saru by Mitsuki Saiga, and Hebi by Asami Sanada. In the English dub, while Vic Mignogna in English dub voiced Zabimaru's original form, Saru is voiced by Mary Elizabeth McGlynn while Hebi is voiced by Michelle Ruff in English dub.

==== Hyōrinmaru ====
Hyōrinmaru (氷輪丸; Ice Ring) is the Zanpakutō owned by Tōshirō Hitsugaya, appearing as a dragon made of ice. Hyōrinmaru already tried to communicate with Hitsugaya before he became a Soul Reaper. During the anime-exclusive Zanpakutō Rebellion arc, Hyōrinmaru assumes the form of a tall young man with long-flowing green hair and dragon limbs. In the second film, "The Diamond Dust Rebellion", it was revealed that Hitsugaya's friend Sōjirō Kusaka also possessed Hyōrinmaru. Though the two saw it as a sign of their friendship, the Central 46 members deemed such an event unacceptable with Kusaka seemingly put to death, after he failed a test he and a reluctant Histugaya were put through over which of them can be recognized as the sole owner of Hyōrinmaru. But when Kusaka returns, having been brought back to life by the item, he uses the power of Ōin (王印; "King's Seal") to transform into a parody of Hyōrinmaru, before Ichigo forces Kusaka back to his Soul Reaper state so Hitsugaya can settle things with his friend.

Hyōrinmaru is voiced by Daisuke Matsuoka in the original Japanese version of the second film, by Kenji Hamada in the Japanese version of the anime, and by Travis Willingham in the respectful English dubs.

==== Katen Kyōkotsu ====
Katen Kyōkotsu (花天狂骨; Bones of Heavenly Blooming Madness) is a pair of Zanpakutō owned by Shunsui Kyōraku. Shunsui's Zanpakutō, named simply Katen (花天, Heavenly Flower), manifests as a tall, well-endowed violet-haired woman with an eyepatch, whom Shunsui affectionately calls "Ohana" (お花; Flower). Katen physically appears when Shunsui unleashes his bankai, Shunsui, having explained that she only lets him use her full power when she is in the right mood due to her moody nature. When asked by his sister-in-law to conceal Shinken Hakkyōken, Shunsei has Katen create an offshoot of herself to hold the cursed Zanpakutō in her body. This offshoot assumes the form of a silent, young kunoichi that sees battle as a game, named Kyōkotsu (狂骨; Madness Bone) and nicknamed by Shunsui as "Okyō" (お狂; Madness). While both Katen and Kyōkotsu make their initial debut in anime-exclusive Zanpakutō Rebellion arc, they appear in the final arc of the manga: Katen appearing when Shunsui uses his bankai to fight Lille Barro, with Kyōkotsu appearing when Shunsui decides to give Nanao her family's Zanpakutō as a last resort to defeat Lille.

Katen is voiced in Japanese by Ayumi Fujimura in the original Japanese version of the first anime and Ami Koshimizu in Thousand-Year Blood War. In the English dub, she is voiced by Erin Fitzgerald in the original aime and by Cherami Leigh in Thousand-Year Blood War.

=== Mimihagi ===
Mimihagi (ミミハギ) is a fallen god that is a vassal of the Soul King, specifically its animate right arm, appearing as a humanoid in the shape of an arm with one eye on his hand-like head, similar to Pernida Parnkgjas. Mimihagi has long been forgotten by most in the Soul Society yet is revered in the outer areas of Eastern Rukongai for his ability to prolong a person's life by taking the afflicted portion of their body from them and giving the person the means to live through the Kamikake (神掛; lit. "Suspended God") ability to compensate for the irreversible side-effects. Such an example is Jūshirō Ukitake, whose lungs Mimihagi removed at his parents' behest. During the second invasion of the Wandenreich, Jūshirō activated Kamikake to offer his body to Mimihagi to revive the Soul King. Mimihagi accepts Jūshirō's sacrifice, but is stopped from reviving the Soul King by Yhwach and is absorbed by the Quincy.

== Merchandise ==
Several types of merchandise have been produced based on the likeness of the Bleach characters. Apparels from them include replicas of the zanpakutō, hollow masks as well as Soul Reapers clothes for cosplays. Other merchandise based on them include action-figures, plush, and key-chains. Characters are also featured on Bleach trading cards that have different abilities depending on the character appearing in the cards. In Japan, there have been released soundtracks in which the voice actors from the anime perform songs related to their characters. Most characters are also featured in video games from the series, with most of them being fighting games.

== Reception ==
The characters from the series have received praise and criticism from several reviewers. Anime News Network noted them to be relatively stereotypical but with traits that make them look "special" noting the interactions they have as well as the large and variable cast of side characters. They were also praised for having energetic attitudes and distinctive ways of fighting. While they commented on Ichigo on being "almost a typical anti-hero", they mention that he is just a common person with a tragic past making him likable to the fans. They also praised Tite Kubo's artwork to give them good clothes and the anime staff for improving them. Mania Entertainment agreed with praising the artwork of the manga and noted that the "characters have personalities and oddities all described in those designs". They have also praised the development of the characters remarking how Renji, before being defeated by Ichigo, he asks him to save Rukia, while during his first appearances he was more violent and was meant to arrest her. IGN agreed and mentioned that the large number of plot happening within each character make the series more than "example of shonen fighting manga". However, the reviewer commented that it is hard to take the series seriously when one of the main Arrancar is named Grimmjow Jeagerjacquez. Wizard Universe also praised Ichigo as the best hero of 2007 commenting that the only reason why he is not like every "shonen character" is that he only wants to save his friends, not because he tries to act as a hero.

IGN also added that while some fights were dragged for many chapters, they are easy to enjoy due to the abilities of the characters and the artwork from Kubo. In another review, comicbookbin said that Bleach's characters tended to avoid the most obvious courses of action, giving the series an element of unpredictability. Tite Kubo has been praised by comicbookbin.com for creating a "dense multi-layered narrative housing a mob of characters". They remarked how each character from the series had two subplots making the reader hard to remember although that made them more complex. In a review from the volume 20, they noted how Kubo turned the fights into "martial arts and epic fantasy serial" comparing them with fights from famous movies like The Matrix and praised how well drawn they are. Anime News Network also added that the English voice acting of the characters is as good as the Japanese one, considering each of them very original.
