= Soviet cruiser Tallinn =

Tallinn (Russian: Таллин; the capital city of then Estonian Soviet Socialist Republic) can refer to a number of Soviet cruisers:

- Soviet cruiser Tallinn (1940), an unfinished Soviet Navy Admiral Hipper-class cruiser, former German cruiser Lützow.
- Soviet cruiser Tallinn (1976), a Soviet Navy Kara-class cruiser.
