= Genryusai =

Genryusai may refer to:

- Maki Genryusai, a female character in the Final Fight and Street Fighter video game series
- Shigekuni Yamamoto-Genryūsai, a male character featured in the manga and anime series Bleach
