= Bleach season 4 =

Season of television series

Bleach
- Season 4
- The cover of the first DVD compilation released by Aniplex of The Bount arc, featuring Ichigo Kurosaki
- No. of episodes: 28

Release
- Original network: TV Tokyo
- Original release: January 17 – August 1, 2006

Season chronology
- ← Previous; Season 3 Next → Season 5

The fourth season of the Bleach anime series was directed by Noriyuki Abe and produced by Studio Pierrot. Like the rest of the series, the season follows the adventures of Ichigo Kurosaki and company, but instead of adapting content from Tite Kubo's Bleach manga series, it features an original, self-contained filler story arc. The twenty-eight episodes form the Bount arc (バウント篇, Baunto Hen), which focuses on the introduction of the Bount, a race of vampiric beings that consume human souls to extend their lives, and their conflicts with Ichigo and his allies.

The season aired from January to August 2006 on TV Tokyo. The English adaptation of the season aired on Cartoon Network's Adult Swim in the United States from May to December 2008. Seven DVD compilations, each containing four episodes of the season, were released by Aniplex between May 24 to December 20, 2006. Viz Media released the season on seventeen DVDs from May 12 to November 17, 2009. Each of them contain four episodes in both English and Japanese languages. Two DVD box sets collecting the entire season were released on November 3, 2009, and February 16, 2010. Manga Entertainment released the season in three DVDs for the United Kingdom from October 26, 2009, to June 7, 2010, while a box set was released on August 9, 2010.

The episodes use five pieces of theme music: two opening themes and three ending themes. The opening theme for the first eleven episodes is "Ichirin no Hana" (一輪の花, Ichirin no Hana) by High and Mighty Color; the rest of the episodes use "Tonight, Tonight, Tonight" by Beat Crusaders. The first ending theme is "My Pace" (マイペース, Mai Pēsu) by SunSet Swish, switching at episode 75 to "Hanabi" by Ikimonogakari and switching at episode 87 to "Movin!!" by Takacha.

== Episodes ==
No. overall	No. in season	Title	Storyboarded by	Directed by	Written by	Original release date	English air date
64	1	"New School Term, Renji Has Come to the Material World?!"; Transliteration: "Shingakki, Gense ni Renji ga Yatte Kita!?" (Japanese: 新学期、現世に恋次がやって来た!?)	Noriyuki Abe	Mitsutaka Noshitani	Masashi Sogo	January 17, 2006	May 18, 2008
After returning from the Soul Society, Ichigo Kurosaki resumes his everyday life as a high school student in Karakura Town. Lieutenant Renji Abarai arrives in Karakura, however, and Ichigo claims that Renji is his cousin to the surrounding onlookers. Later that night, Orihime Inoue has a dream about her brother Sora, and is drawn into a large gate while three mysterious people observe.
65	2	"Creeping Terror, the Second Victim"; Transliteration: "Shinobi yoru Kyōfu, Nibanme no Giseisha" (Japanese: 忍び寄る恐怖、2番目の犠牲者)	Jun'ya Koshiba	Jun'ya Koshiba	Masashi Sogo	January 24, 2006	May 25, 2008
After Orihime disappears, Ichigo, Renji, Uryū Ishida and Yasutora "Chad" Sado try to find her. A mysterious girl contacts Renji on his cellphone, and reveals that Orihime will return to her house at eight o'clock. They find Orihime at that time, but she is an imposter. Chad is then taken by the three figures.
66	3	"Breakthrough! The Trap Hidden in the Labyrinth"; Transliteration: "Toppa seyo! Meikyū ni Hisomu Wana" (Japanese: 突破せよ！迷宮に潜む罠)	Shigeru Ueda	Shigeru Ueda	Masahiro Ōkubo	January 31, 2006	June 1, 2008
After the loss of Chad, the caller instructs Ichigo, Renji and Uryū to appear at the local museum for a continuation of her game. Once there, the museum turns into a looping maze with illusions and traps. Along the way, the group starts to splinter apart due to their irritation and desire to find their own way in the maze. As Ichigo and Renji start to walk off, Uryū notices a limitation of the illusion and plots a way out. When they escape the maze, it becomes apparent that the three mysterious people are modified souls. Following this revelation, they make their escape, leaving Orihime and Chad behind.
67	4	"Death Game! The Missing Classmate"; Transliteration: "Shi no Gēmu! Kieru Kurasumeito" (Japanese: 死のゲーム！消えるクラスメイト)	Motosuke Takahashi	Jun'ya Koshiba	Rika Nakase	February 7, 2006	June 8, 2008
After leaving the museum, the group is confronted by the modified souls, who tell them that one of their core group has been replaced by an imposter, and they must find out who that is before noon, or everyone in their school will be killed. While out in the hall at Ichigo's school, he becomes suspicious of Renji thinking that he is the imposter. He tells him to "take it off". Ichigo means Renji's gigai but he does not specify it. The class goes out to see what the commotion is about and find Ichigo and Renji in a suggestive position. As the group attempts to find the imposter, Tatsuki Arisawa, one of Ichigo's classmates, disappears. At the last minute, it is decided that the imposter was posing as Chad, but the modified souls had already kidnapped the students.
68	5	"True Identity of the Devil, the Secret which Is Revealed"; Transliteration: "Akuma no Shōtai, Akasareta Himitsu" (Japanese: 悪魔の正体、明かされた秘密)	Noriyuki Abe	Akira Shimizu	Masashi Sogo	February 14, 2006 (Note: Episodes 68 and 69 originally aired together as a one-hour special.)	June 15, 2008
Ichigo and the others begin the final game against the modified souls. The modified souls conjure a massive gate that consumes the group. After putting Chad into a giant hourglass, the modified soul Lirin tells Ichigo and the others that they have five minutes to defeat the modified souls and save Chad. Ichigo manages to break the hourglass and discovers that Kisuke Urahara had planned this as a group training exercise, as well as to tell the group that Uryū no longer has his Quincy powers. Meanwhile, Soul Reapers Yoruichi Shihōin and Suì-Fēng have been investigating the Bounts, a group of humans that consume souls for sustenance. Finding the remains of a soul, they rush away to the site of another attack, where Yoruichi stops a woman from consuming another soul.
69	6	"Bount! The Ones Who Hunt Souls"; Transliteration: "Baunto! Tamashii o Karu Mono-tachi" (Japanese: バウント！魂を狩る者たち)	Tetsuhito Saitō	Kazunori Mizuno (Note: Credited under the pen name "Kumi Hitokuchi" (一口 久美, Hitokuchi Kumi).)	Genki Yoshimura	February 14, 2006	June 22, 2008
At Urahara's shop, Kisuke discusses about the Bounts with Ichigo and his friends, and orders the modified souls, Lirin, Noba and Kurōdo, to accompany them. The group subsequently locates a pair of Bounts, Yoshino Sōma and Ryō Udagawa. As Udagawa retreats, Ichigo begins to battle Yoshino, who summons her "doll" Goethe, a Familiar unique to each of the Bounts.
70	7	"Rukia's Return! Revival of the Substitute Team!"; Transliteration: "Rukia no Kikan! Daikō Chīmu Fukkatsu" (Japanese: ルキアの帰還！代行チーム復活)	Masami Shimoda	Mitsutaka Noshitani	Michiko Yokote	February 21, 2006	June 29, 2008
Goethe overwhelms Ichigo with his fire attacks, and Ichigo is saved by Rukia Kuchiki. Goethe continues to attack, but is restrained by Udagawa, who takes Yoshino and Goethe away from the battle. After the battle, Ichigo and his friends celebrate Rukia's return, and discuss the Bounts' threat in Ichigo's house. The following day, Udagawa begins to consume the souls of the humans he encounters, and Ichigo and his friends begin to fight him. Elsewhere, Yoshino escapes from the Bounts' headquarters, and is watched by the leader of the Bounts, Jin Kariya.
71	8	"The Moment of Collision! An Evil Hand Draws Near to the Quincy"; Transliteration: "Gekitotsu no Toki! Kuinshī ni Semaru Ma no Te" (Japanese: 激突の時！クインシーに迫る魔の手)	Tetsuhito Saitō	Hodaka Kuramoto	Rika Nakase	March 7, 2006	July 6, 2008
Udagawa manages to capture Uryū, but Yoshino takes Uryū away from him. Udagawa uses his doll to summon a wave of snakes, but retreats after Ururu Tsumugiya begins attacking him with her bazooka. In the Soul Society, Soul Reaper captain Shunsui Kyōraku asks twelfth division captain Mayuri Kurotsuchi about the Bounts. However, Mayuri refuses to show him the data and later discovers that it has been erased. Uryū awakens in an apartment, where Yoshino tells him that Kariya seeks a Quincy in order to open a gateway to the "world of the dead".
72	9	"Water Attack! Escape from the Shutdown Hospital"; Transliteration: "Mizu no Kōgeki! Tozasareta Byōin kara no Dasshutsu" (Japanese: 水の攻撃！閉ざされた病院からの脱出)	Rei Kaneko	Kazunori Mizuno	Genki Yoshimura	March 14, 2006	July 13, 2008
Ichigo and the others receive a message from Uryū and find him at the hospital. The hospital room then floods with water, which the group realizes is the dolls of unidentified Bount members. The dolls attempt to drown Uryū, but Uryū is rescued when Ichigo cuts the water dolls. The group attempts to flee and they encounter the two Bount members, Hō and Ban. As the rest of the group retreats with Uryū, Ichigo and Renji fight Hō and Ban.
73	10	"Gathering Bounts! The Man Who Makes His Move"; Transliteration: "Baunto Shūketsu! Ugokidasu Otoko" (Japanese: バウント集結！動き出す男)	Jun'ya Koshiba	Jun'ya Koshiba	Masashi Sogo	March 28, 2006 (Note: Episodes 73 and 74 originally aired together as a one-hour special.)	July 20, 2008
Ichigo and Renji's fight with Hō and Ban takes them outside the hospital. Hō and Ban transform their dolls into massive pillars of water that swallow up Ichigo, Renji and Rukia as Chad and Orihime try to get Uryū to safety. Giving up on drowning Ichigo and the others, the twins decide to go after Uryū. Chad starts to fight the twins and separates them, causing their dolls to collapse. In response, Hō and Ban force Ichigo and company to drink their dolls, allowing the twins to rip their bodies apart from the inside. Ganju Shiba and Hanatarō Yamada arrive, and Ganju uses his fireworks to destroy the dolls, killing Hō and Ban. As the group surveys the aftermath, however, they realize that Uryū is missing.
74	11	"Memories of an Eternally Living Clan"; Transliteration: "Eien o Ikiru Ichizoku no Kioku" (Japanese: 永遠を生きる一族の記憶)	Tetsuhito Saitō	Tetsuhito Saitō	Natsuko Takahashi	March 28, 2006	July 26, 2008
As Uryū wanders aimlessly away from his friends, he encounters Yoshino again, who tells him how the Bount's longevity leads to the deterioration of their mental state. Meanwhile, Kariya informs the Bounts that he has found a Quincy, and that he will lead them into a new shining era. In the Soul Society, eleventh division captain Kenpachi Zaraki learns that Maki Ichinose, a former member of his division he believed to be dead, is alive. Ichinose, unknown to Kenpachi, has joined Kariya's Bounts.
75	12	"Earth-Shattering Event at 11th Squad! The Shinigami Who Rises Again"; Transliteration: "Jūichibantai Gekishin! Yomigaetta Shinigami" (Japanese: 十一番隊激震！よみがえった死神)	Jun'ya Koshiba	Takeshi Shirai	Michiko Yokote	April 4, 2006 (Note: Episodes 75 and 76 originally aired together as a one-hour special.)	August 2, 2008
Yoshino and Uryū are attacked by the Bount Gō Koga, who summons his doll, Dalk, a collection of metal balls that manifests as a humanoid spider creature. Following a short battle, Koga captures both of them, and takes them to Kariya's mansion. Using the modified souls' sensing abilities, Ichigo is able to track the Bounts, and travels to their location. In the Soul Society, Mayuri has called a meeting of all the Soul Reaper captains, and informs them that there is a traitor in their midst that erased items from his database. Kenpachi begins to suspect that Ichinose is the culprit. Meanwhile, Kariya attempts to gain Uryū's loyalty by promising a better world for Bounts and Quincy, but Uryū is suspicious of Kariya's intentions.
76	13	"Crashing Force! Fried vs. Zangetsu"; Transliteration: "Chikara no Gekitotsu! Furīdo VS Zangetsu" (Japanese: 力の激突！フリードVS斬月)	Norihiro Sunagawa	Mitsutaka Noshitani	Masahiro Ōkubo	April 4, 2006	August 10, 2008
Ichigo, Rukia and the modified souls enter Kariya's mansion, and confront Kariya, demanding that Uryū be released. While Ichigo begins to fight Udagawa, Rukia and the modified souls try to find Uryū, but are stopped by Ichinose, who tells Rukia of how he became disillusioned with the Thirteen Court Guard Squads when Kenpachi became the captain of the eleventh division by killing the previous captain. Ichinose leaves to protect Kariya when he notices that Udagawa has stopped fighting Ichigo and attempted to betray Kariya. Ichinose kills Udagawa and begins to fight with Ichigo.
77	14	"Unfading Grudge! The Shinigami whom Kenpachi Killed"; Transliteration: "Kienu Onnen! Kenpachi ga Kitta Shinigami" (Japanese: 消えぬ怨念！剣八が斬った死神)	Hodaka Kuramoto Tetsuhito Saitō	Hodaka Kuramoto	Rika Nakase	April 11, 2006	August 24, 2008
As Ichinose and Ichigo fight, Ichinose relates his past as a Soul Reaper. As a member of the eleventh division, he was horrified when Kenpachi slew the previous captain, and attempted to avenge his captain by killing Kenpachi, who easily defeats Ichinose. Disillusioned, Ichinose left the Soul Society and encountered Kariya, to whom he swore his loyalty. Following this revelation, Kariya begins to fight Ichigo, overwhelming him, as Ururu begins to attack the mansion with her bazooka. Yoruichi carries Ichigo to safety, and the rest of the group retreats.
78	15	"Shocking Revelations for the 13 Divisions!! The Truth Buried in History"; Transliteration: "Gotei Jūsantai Kyōgaku!! Rekishi ni Uzumoreta Shinjitsu" (Japanese: 護廷十三隊驚愕!!歴史に埋もれた真実)	Motosuke Takahashi	Jun'ya Koshiba	Masashi Sogo	May 2, 2006	August 31, 2008
In the Soul Society, Mayuri explains the Bounts' history to the other captains. In the past, the Quincy and the Bounts had a battle that the Bounts lost. Following this incident, the Bounts began to consume living souls to increase their power. As such, Mayuri concludes that the number of living souls attacked will escalate as the Bounts become more active. In Karakura Town, Ichigo is depressed by his defeat by Kariya. Ganju and Renji both fight Ichigo, and after Renji lectures him, Ichigo realizes how unfocused he has become.
79	16	"Yoshino's Decision of Death"; Transliteration: "Yoshino, Shi o Kaketa Omoi" (Japanese: 芳野、死をかけた想い)	Manabu Fukazawa	Takeshi Shirai	Genki Yoshimura	May 9, 2006	September 7, 2008
Ichigo and Renji spend the entire night training under Urahara's shop. Elsewhere, Yoshino fuses with Goethe in order to increase her strength. She attempts to kill Kariya, and he easily defeats her. Following her death, he uses her body to create the bitto, insects able to consume souls.
80	17	"Assault from a Formidable Enemy! A Tiny Final Line of Defense?!"; Transliteration: "Kyōteki no Kyūshū! Chiisana Saishū Bōei Sen!?" (Japanese: 強敵の急襲！小さな最終防衛線!?)	Hitoyuki Matsui	Shigeru Ueda	Masahiro Ōkubo	May 16, 2006	September 13, 2008
Due to the lack of Bount sightings, Urahara decides that he and Renji should go and investigate the Bounts' mansion, and sends Ichigo home with the modified souls to devise countermeasures. Lirin and Kurōdo wear special suits to trick Ichigo into thinking they are Bounts as to get back at him but things go bad when Rukia falls for the trick and continuously attacks them across town. Lirin, Kurōdo, and Noba present a variety of ideas, but at the day's end, none of them are able to produce an actual anti-Bount device.
81	18	"Hitsugaya Moves! The Attacked City"; Transliteration: "Hitsugaya Ugoku! Osowareta Machi" (Japanese: 日番谷動く！襲われた街)	Tetsuhito Saitō	Eitarō Ano	Masashi Sogo	May 23, 2006	September 20, 2008
In Karakura Town, humans are being attacked by the bitto, which suck out their souls and reduce their bodies into dust. They then return to the Bounts and provide them with purified souls to drink in order to increase their power. Members of Suì-Fēng's second division attack the bitto, but they cannot damage them. Tenth division captain Tōshirō Hitsugaya orders more Soul Reapers to enter the human world, noting that they cannot rely on Ichigo alone. Meanwhile, Renji defends a human boy against a bitto assault.
82	19	"Ichigo vs. Dalk! Appearance of the Faded Darkness"; Transliteration: "Ichigo VS Daruku! Shirakigami no Shutsugen" (Japanese: 一護VSダルク！白き闇の出現)	Jun'ya Koshiba	Kazunori Mizuno	Michiko Yokote	May 30, 2006	October 4, 2008
After the Bounts consume the power of the bitto, Kariya tells the Bounts to test their new powers while he retires to his room. The Bount Yoshi attacks Rukia, Orihime and Kurōdo while they are on their way to help Renji. Meanwhile, Ichigo is attacked by Koga and his doll Dalk, which ensnares Ichigo in a metal net, and Ichigo's inner hollow takes over his body, allowing him to defeat the doll easily. However before dealing the final blow, Ichigo manages to regain control of his body, and subsequently collapses from exhaustion.
83	20	"Grey Shadow, the Secret of the Dolls"; Transliteration: "Haiiro no Kage, Dōru no Himitsu" (Japanese: 灰色の影、ドールの秘密)	Jun Takada	Akira Shimizu	Natsuko Takahashi	June 6, 2006	October 11, 2008
As Koga tells Dalk to finish Ichigo off, he is reminded of Cain, a young Bount he once mentored. In a flashback, Koga remembers when he first met Cain, and taught him how to summon his doll and live with another Bount. However, the doll Cain created was too powerful for him to control and destroyed him, an incident Koga continues to regret.
84	21	"Dissension in the Substitute Team? Rukia's Betrayal"; Transliteration: "Daikō Chīmu Bunretsu? Uragitta Rukia" (Japanese: 代行チーム分裂？裏切ったルキア)	Tetsuya Endō	Takeshi Shirai	Rika Nakase	June 13, 2006 (Note: Episodes 84 and 85 originally aired together as a one-hour special due to the 2006 World Cup.)	October 18, 2008
As Dalk prepares to deal the final blow to Ichigo, third division lieutenant Izuru Kira arrives and fights with Dalk. Using the shikai of his zanpakutō, Kira attacks Dalk, increasing her weight with every strike. Eventually, Dalk is rendered unable to move, and Kira begins to battle Koga. Meanwhile, Yoshi is overpowering Orihime and Rukia, but her lack of cooperation with her doll causes her to miss a fatal attack to Rukia. The Bount Mabashi arrives, and uses his doll Ritz to enter Rukia's soul and take over her body.
85	22	"Deadly Battle of Tears! Rukia vs. Orihime"; Transliteration: "Namida no Shitō! Rukia VS Orihime" (Japanese: 涙の死闘！ルキアVS織姫)	Mitsutaka Noshitani	Mitsutaka Noshitani	Masashi Sogo	June 13, 2006	October 25, 2008
Using Ritz to control Rukia, Mabashi forces Rukia to fight Orihime, who is unwilling to fight against Rukia, as she had traveled with Ichigo to the Soul Society for the purpose of saving her. Ninth division lieutenant Shūhei Hisagi arrives and after learning of the situation from Orihime, intends to kill Rukia. However, Orihime manages to separate Ritz from Rukia with her abilities, and Hisagi defeats Ritz. Before Hisagi can attack Mabashi, Ichinose arrives and retreats with Mabashi.
86	23	"Rangiku Dances! Slice the Invisible Enemy!"; Transliteration: "Rangiku Mau! Mienai Teki o Kire!" (Japanese: 乱菊舞う！見えない敵を斬れ)	Tetsuhito Saitō	Hodaka Kuramoto	Masahiro Ōkubo	June 20, 2006	November 1, 2008
Tenth division lieutenant Rangiku Matsumoto encounters Chad, Ururu and Noba battling with the Bount Sawatari, who summons his doll, Baura, a giant rocklike fish that is able to travel through solid surfaces by phasing into a different dimension. Due to this ability, Chad and Rangiku find it difficult to attack Baura, and Baura manages to swallow Ururu. Rangiku uses herself as bait to lure Baura out of the ground, and he is attacked by Chad, who sends him into Noba. Noba uses his powers to send Sawatari and Baura to another dimension, but the pair manage to escape, injuring Noba.
87	24	"Byakuya is summoned! The Gotei 13 start to move!" Transliteration: "Byakuya Shōshū! Ugokidasu Gotei Jūsantai" (Japanese: 白哉召集！動き出す護廷十三隊)	Kazunori Mizuno	Kazunori Mizuno	Masahiro Ōkubo Masashi Sogo	July 4, 2006	November 9, 2008
Despite his injuries, Noba teleports Rangiku and Chad to a distant location to plan an attack on Sawatari. By linking Noba's ability to sense the Bount with her kidō spell, Rangiku locates Sawatari and Chad punches Baura, forcing him to release Ururu. In the Soul Society, Mayuri has found the lost data on the Bounts and instructs his lieutenant, Nemu Kurotsuchi, to give an item to Uryū. Elsewhere in the Soul Society, an intruder manages to enter the Seireitei, the Soul Reaper fortress. Afterwards, Genryūsai Shigekuni Yamamoto, the captain of the first division and leader of the Thirteen Court Guard Squads, summons sixth division captain Byakuya Kuchiki.
88	25	"Annihilation of the Lieutenants!? Trap in the Underground Cave"; Transliteration: "Fukutaichō Zenmetsu!? Chika Dōkutsu no Wana" (Japanese: 副隊長全滅!?地下洞窟の罠)	Jun Takada	Eitarō Ano	Masashi Sogo	July 11, 2006	November 16, 2008
After defeating the Bounts in their respective battles, Ichigo and his friends regroup at Urahara's shop while the Soul Reapers that came to the human world head towards the Bounts' hideout. The Soul Reapers are accosted by the Bount Ugaki, who uses his doll Gesell to separate the Soul Reapers and begins to defeat them individually with Gesell. In the Soul Society, Yamamoto informs Byakuya that Mayuri is suspected of treason and requests that Byakuya give him any records the Kuchiki clan has of the Bounts.
89	26	"Rematch?! Ishida vs. Nemu"; Transliteration: "Saisen!? Ishida VS Nemu" (Japanese: 再戦!?石田VSネム)	Tetsuhito Saitō	Takeshi Shirai	Masashi Sogo	July 18, 2006	November 23, 2008
Ichigo and Renji arrive at the mouth of the cave and are quickly surrounded by Gesell, which takes the form of a large group of small, one-eyed flying creatures. They meet Rangiku, who tells them to destroy anything that can cast a shadow, and they manage to defeat the creatures. However, they forget that their own bodies can also create shadows, which is what Ugaki uses to bring forth two sword arms. Luckily for them, Hisagi and Kira come to help. Meanwhile, Uryū is visited by Nemu, who proceeds to attack Uryū to confirm that he has lost his powers. Nemu then gives Uryū a Quincy battle accessory to allow him to use his powers.
90	27	"Renji Abarai, Bankai of the Soul!"; Transliteration: "Abarai Renji, Tamashii no Bankai!" (Japanese: 阿散井恋次、魂の卍解！)	Motosuke Takahashi	Jun'ya Koshiba	Masashi Sogo	July 25, 2006	November 30, 2008
As Ichigo and Renji travel deeper into the cave, they find Yumichika. Ugaki summons the true form of Gesell, a large black, humanoid creature. Gesell throws Yumichika's body at Ichigo and Renji, but Renji manages to catch Yumichika, who is still alive. Renji uses his bankai to battle Gesell, and Ugaki loses control of his doll. Ugaki asks Kariya to save him, but Kariya refuses, watching as Gesell causes the cave to collapse upon Ugaki. Ichigo manages to escape from the debris and finds Kariya and the other Bounts. Ichigo begins to battle Kariya, who deals with Ichigo effortlessly. Kariya informs Ichigo that they never intended to connect the human world to the "world of the dead", but rather to the Soul Society in order to destroy the Soul Reapers, who created the Bounts.
91	28	"Shinigami and Quincy, the Reviving Power"; Transliteration: "Shinigami to Kuinshī, Yomigaeru Chikara" (Japanese: 死神とクインシー、よみがえる力)	Manabu Fukazawa	Shigeru Ueda	Masashi Sogo	August 1, 2006	December 7, 2008
As Kariya is about to stab Ichigo with his own zanpakutō, Ichigo grabs it and stabs himself with it, forcing his subconscious into the world of his zanpakutō, Zangetsu. After a discussion with Zangetsu, Ichigo returns to reality and uses his bankai, which enables him to fight evenly with Kariya. Uryū arrives and uses his powers to open the gateway created by the Bounts into the Soul Society. When Kariya thanks him, Uryū informs Kariya that he did so to defeat the Bounts in the Soul Society.
