= Bleach season 3 =

Season of television series

Bleach
- Season 3
- The cover of the first DVD compilation released by Aniplex of The Rescue arc, featuring Ichigo Kurosaki
- No. of episodes: 22

Release
- Original network: TV Tokyo
- Original release: July 26, 2005 – January 10, 2006

Season chronology
- ← Previous; Season 2 Next → Season 4

The Soul Society: The Rescue arc (尸魂界(ソウル・ソサエティ)・救出篇, Sōru Sosaeti: Kyūshutsu-hen) is the third season of the Bleach anime television series. In the English adaptation of the anime released by Viz Media, the title is changed to simply The Rescue. The episodes are directed by Noriyuki Abe, and produced by TV Tokyo, Dentsu, and Studio Pierrot. The season adapts Tite Kubo's Bleach manga series from the rest of the 14th volume to the 21st volume (chapters 118–182), with the exception of episode 50 (filler). The season follows Ichigo Kurosaki defending Rukia Kuchiki from Soul Reapers in the Soul Society.

The season aired from July 2005 to January 2006 on TV Tokyo. The English adaptation of the season began airing in July 2007 on Cartoon Network's Adult Swim in the United States. In October 2007 the series went on a hiatus; episodes resumed airing in March 2008 and finished in May of the same year.

The episodes use four pieces of theme music: two opening themes and two ending themes. The opening theme for the first ten episodes is "D-TecnoLife" by Uverworld; the other episodes of the season use "Ichirin no Hana" (一輪の花, Single Flower) by High and Mighty Color. The two ending themes are "HappyPeople" by Skoop on Somebody, used from episode 42 to 51, and Yui's "Life", which was used for the remainder of the episodes.

Five DVD compilations, each containing four episodes of the season, with the exception of the last two discs with contain five episodes, were released by Aniplex between December 21, 2005, to April 26, 2006. The English adaptation of the anime is distributed by Viz Media; three DVD compilations have been released on July 22, September 23, and November 18, 2008, respectively. Another DVD compilation was set for release on January 20, 2009.

== Episodes ==
No. overall	No. in season	Title	Directed by (Note: Production staff information is taken from the ending credits of each episode.)	Written by	Storyboarded by	Original release date	English air date
42	1	"Yoruichi, Goddess of Flash, Dances!"; Transliteration: "Shunjin Yoruichi, Mau!" (Japanese: 瞬神夜一、舞う！)	Akira Iwanaga	Michiko Yokote	Jun'ya Koshiba	July 26, 2005	July 22, 2007
As Renji Abarai recovers in his cell, the spirit of his zanpakutō Zabimaru says that he wishes to face Ichigo Kurosaki's zanpakutō Zangetsu again, but Renji tells him that Ichigo is no longer his enemy. Elsewhere, Yoruichi Shihōin manages to evade Byakuya Kuchiki and escape with Ichigo. After Ichigo regains consciousness, she begins to instruct him in the use of his bankai, the final stage of his zanpakutō that would vastly increase his power. Orihime Inoue and Uryū Ishida are attempting to travel to Rukia Kuchiki's cell by using Soul Reaper clothes, but they are closely watched by twelfth division captain Mayuri Kurotsuchi.
43	2	"The Despicable Shinigami"; Transliteration: "Hiretsu na Shinigami" (Japanese: 卑劣な死神)	Jun'ya Koshiba	Michiko Yokote	Motosuke Takahashi	August 2, 2005	July 29, 2007
Orihime and Uryū continue towards Rukia's location, but are accosted by Makizō Aramaki, a Soul Reaper of the eleventh division. Some twelfth division members arrive to help, but Mayuri, who has made them into human bombs, detonates them. Orihime uses her powers to protect Uryū and herself from the explosions, and Mayuri expresses his wish to experiment on Orihime. Uryū begins to fight Mayuri, but is quickly disabled by the paralyzing abilities of Mayuri's zanpakutō when his lieutenant, Nemu Kurotsuchi, uses her body to hold down Uryū. Mayuri then reveals that he has experimented on many other Quincy, including Uryū's grandfather, Sōken Ishida, and was responsible for his death.
44	3	"Ishida's Ultimate Power!"; Transliteration: "Ishida, Kyokugen no Chikara!" (Japanese: 石田、極限の力！)	Kazunori Mizuno (Note: Credited under the pen name "Ōkura Shirakawa" (白川 巨椋, Shirakawa Ōkura).)	Masashi Sogo	Satoshi Nishimura	August 9, 2005	August 5, 2007
Uryū uses the Quincy technique ransōtengai to overcome the paralysis of Mayuri's zanpakutō. However, he is outclassed by Mayuri, and is forced to take off his sanrei glove, an act that releases the limits on his powers. Uryū proceeds to completely overwhelm Mayuri, even after Mayuri releases his bankai, but Mayuri escapes by transforming into a liquid. Nemu gives Uryū the antidote to the poison of Mayuri's bankai, and Uryū continues on towards Rukia's cell, severely weakened, until he is confronted by another Soul Reaper captain, Kaname Tōsen.
45	4	"Overcome Your Limits!"; Transliteration: "Genkai o Koero!" (Japanese: 限界を越えろ！)	Kazunobu Shimizu	Genki Yoshimura	Tetsuhito Saitō	August 16, 2005	August 12, 2007
Tōsen disables Uryū instantly with his zanpakutō, and has him incarcerated. Yoruichi summons Zangetsu using a tenshintai, one of Kisuke Urahara's inventions. Zangetsu states that if Ichigo defeats him, he will be able to perform his bankai, and will be slain if he fails. Elsewhere, Hanatarō Yamada is admonished by his captain, Retsu Unohana, for helping Ichigo, Renji breaks out of his prison cell, third division captain Gin Ichimaru releases his lieutenant, Izuru Kira, from his imprisonment, and eleventh division captain Kenpachi Zaraki agrees to help Orihime find Ichigo in order to fight Ichigo again.
46	5	"Authentic Records! School of Shinigami"; Transliteration: "Jitsuroku! Shinigami no Gakkō" (Japanese: 実録！死神の学校)	Kōji Aritomi	Masahiro Ōkubo	Kōji Aritomi	August 23, 2005	August 19, 2007
While incarcerated, fifth division lieutenant Momo Hinamori recalls her experiences at the Soul Reaper Academy, where she befriended Renji and Izuru. On a field trip to hunt hollows, she and her comrades were saved by captain Sousuke Aizen and then-lieutenant Ichimaru when powerful hollows attacked. Back in the present, Hinamori knocks her guard unconscious and escapes from her cell, planning to confront the person who killed Aizen.
47	6	"The Avengers"; Transliteration: "Adautsu Mono-tachi" (Japanese: 仇討つ者たち)	Mitsutaka Noshitani	Natsuko Takahashi	Masami Shimoda	August 30, 2005	September 2, 2007
Yoruichi notes that Ichigo's training for his bankai is going well and stops the training for the day. She reveals in their subsequent conversation that Kisuke Urahara used to be the twelfth division captain. Elsewhere, Tōshirō Hitsugaya confronts Ichimaru and Kira over Aizen's murder, but is interrupted by Hinamori, who believes that Hitsugaya killed Aizen. Hitsugaya knocks Hinamori unconscious and prepares to kill Ichimaru.
48	7	"Hitsugaya Roars!"; Transliteration: "Hitsugaya, Hoeru!" (Japanese: 日番谷、吼える！)	Jun'ya Koshiba	Rika Nakase	Jun'ya Koshiba	September 6, 2005	September 9, 2007
Hitsugaya and Ichimaru begin to fight, and Ichimaru initially takes the upper hand with his swordplay. Hitsugaya turns the tables by using the shikai of his zanpakutō to immobilize Ichimaru by freezing his arm, but this advantage is countered when Ichimaru uses his own shikai to threaten the unconscious Hinamori. Tenth division lieutenant Rangiku Matsumoto arrives to aid Hinamori and Hitsugaya, and Ichimaru withdraws rather than go against her. Meanwhile, Renji arrives at Ichigo's training spot and reveals that Rukia's execution date has been moved to the next day.
49	8	"Rukia's Nightmare"; Transliteration: "Rukia no Akumu" (Japanese: ルキアの悪夢)	Hodaka Kuramoto	Masahiro Ōkubo	Tetsuhito Saitō	September 13, 2005	September 16, 2007
Rukia reminisces about her past as a member of the thirteenth division. As she was able to get into the Thirteen Court Guard Squads due to being part of the Kuchiki clan, she was disliked by the other members of her division, but she was able to construct a deep friendship with lieutenant Kaien Shiba. One night, however, a hollow merged with Kaien and attempted to kill Rukia. Kaien regained control of his body, and impaled himself on Rukia's zanpakutō. Rukia, believing that she is a coward who killed Kaien, is convinced that she should be executed.
50	9	"The Reviving Lion"; Transliteration: "Yomigaeru Shishi" (Japanese: よみがえる獅子)	Shigeki Hatakeyama	Michiko Yokote	Shin'ichi Watanabe	September 20, 2005	September 23, 2007
Kon tries to escape from Yuzu Kurosaki. While on the run, he is found by a desperate Don Kanonji, whose television ratings are starting to plummet. Together they reform the Karakura Superheroes, with Yuzu playing Karakura Yellow and Kon playing Karakura King.
51	10	"Morning of the Sentence"; Transliteration: "Shokei no Asa" (Japanese: 処刑の朝)	Yoshinori Odaka	Genki Yoshimura	Jun'ya Koshiba	September 27, 2005	October 7, 2007
Kenpachi, along with Orihime and his subordinates, begins to travel to the execution grounds, but are confronted by captains Sajin Komamura and Tōsen, with their respective lieutenants, Tetsuzaemon Iba and Shūhei Hisagi. Ikkaku Madarame and Yumichika Ayasegawa, Kenpachi's subordinates, begin fights with Iba and Hisagi respectively, and Komamura and Tōsen attack Kenpachi. Elsewhere, Renji has acquired his bankai, and Yoruichi is confident that Ichigo will do the same.
52	11	"Renji, Oath of the Soul! Death Match with Byakuya"; Transliteration: "Renji, Tamashii no Chikai! Byakuya to no Shitō" (Japanese: 恋次、魂の誓い！白哉との死闘)	Kōji Aritomi	Masashi Sogo	Kōji Aritomi	October 4, 2005 (Note: Episodes 52 and 53 originally aired together as a one-hour special.)	October 14, 2007
Renji travels to Rukia's execution area, and meets his captain Byakuya along the way. Renji ends up using his bankai to fight Byakuya, but his lack of experience with his bankai stymies his efforts. Byakuya uses his shikai to try and counterattack but fails and Renji reveals that his bankai is held together by his spiritual pressure. Byakuya uses his own bankai and attacks again, wounding Renji and causes his bankai to fade away. Finally Renji makes a last try and actually reaches his captain with his zanpakuto, but it breaks and Renji's wounds cause him to fall as the captain congratulates him.
53	12	"Gin Ichimaru's Temptation, Resolution Shattered"; Transliteration: "Ichimaru Gin no Yūwaku, Kuzusareta Kakugo" (Japanese: 市丸ギンの誘惑、崩された覚悟)	Akira Shimizu	Natsuko Takahashi	Akio Kawamura	October 4, 2005	March 2, 2008
As Rukia travels to the execution area, Ichimaru shatters her resolve by offering to help her, but subsequently claiming that his offer was insincere to begin with. Kenpachi is easily battling both Komamura and Tōsen, forcing Tōsen to use his bankai, which removes all of Kenpachi's senses with the exception of his sense of touch. Despite being unable to see Tōsen, Kenpachi manages to locate and injure Tōsen, but is stopped from killing him by Komamura. Komamura activates his bankai and engages Kenpachi. Meanwhile, Rukia arrives at the execution grounds.
54	13	"An Accomplished Oath! Get Back Rukia!"; Transliteration: "Hatasareru Chikai! Rukia Dakkan Naruka!" (Japanese: 果たされる誓い！ルキア奪還なるか)	Kazunori Mizuno (Note: Credited under the pen name "Kumi Hitokuchi" (一口 久美, Hitokuchi Kumi).)	Rika Nakase	Tetsuhito Saitō	October 18, 2005	March 9, 2008
Rukia has accepted her execution, and gives a request to first division captain Genryūsai Shigekuni Yamamoto to send Ichigo and his friends home after her execution. The sōkyoku, a massive halberd that transforms into a phoenix, is the execution method. However, Ichigo steps forward and stops the sōkyoku with his sword, and sympathetic captains Shunsui Kyōraku and Jūshirō Ukitake destroy the sōkyoku. As Renji arrives to take away Rukia, Ichigo defeats three pursuing lieutenants with his bare hands, and turns to face Byakuya.
55	14	"The Strongest Shinigami! Ultimate Confrontation Between Teacher and Students"; Transliteration: "Saikyō no Shinigami! Kyūkyoku no Shitei Taiketsu" (Japanese: 最強の死神！究極の師弟対決)	Mitsutaka Noshitani	Masashi Sogo	Jun'ya Koshiba	October 25, 2005	March 16, 2008
Byakuya begins to fight Ichigo, and promises to execute Rukia himself. Unohana personally heals all of the injured present, then leaves to investigate another location. Kyōraku and Ukitake also sprint from the execution grounds, and the pair confront Yamamoto in a secluded area. In an overwhelming display, Yamamoto activates his shikai and incinerates the surrounding area.
56	15	"Supersonic Battle! Determine the Goddess of Battle"; Transliteration: "Chōsoku no Tatakai! Bu no Megami, Kessu" (Japanese: 超速の戦い！武の女神、決す)	Hodaka Kuramoto	Genki Yoshimura	Tetsuya Endō	November 1, 2005	March 23, 2008
Yumichika returns to his captain after defeating Hisagi, and Kenpachi remarks that Komamura fled after Yamamoto began fighting. Kyōraku and Ukitake decide to fight their teacher, and both use the shikai of their zanpakutō. Meanwhile, second division captain Suì-Fēng begins to fight Yoruichi, her former commander and teacher, and gains the advantage after she begins using her shikai. Believing she has the advantage, Suì-Fēng activates a nameless technique she recently discovered which greatly increases her power. However, Yoruichi activates the same technique, calling it "shunko".
57	16	"Senbonzakura, Crushed! Zangetsu Thrusts Through the Sky"; Transliteration: "Senbonzakura, Funsai! Ten o Tsuku Zangetsu" (Japanese: 千本桜、粉砕！天を衝く斬月)	Jun'ya Koshiba	Rika Nakase	Motosuke Takahashi	November 8, 2005	March 30, 2008
Suì-Fēng recalls her past with Yoruichi. She was Yoruichi's personal guard, and highly faithful to her. However, when Yoruichi left the Soul Society, she felt betrayed, and carried a grudge against her mentor from that point forward. As Suì-Fēng attacks, Yoruichi uses her shunko to block all of Suì-Fēng's attacks. Suì-Fēng breaks down in tears, asking Yoruichi why she did not take her along when she left the Soul Society. Ikkaku and Iba are fighting, albeit casually for sake. Near the execution site, Ichigo uses his newly learned Getsuga Tenshō technique to defeat Byakuya's shikai and requests that Byakuya use his bankai.
58	17	"Unseal! The Black Blade, the Miraculous Power"; Transliteration: "Kaihō! Kuroki Yaiba, Kiseki no Chikara" (Japanese: 開放！黒き刃、奇跡の力)	Noriyuki Abe	Masashi Sogo	Manabu Fukazawa	November 15, 2005	April 6, 2008
Byakuya uses his bankai and overwhelms Ichigo with millions of tiny blades. In response, Ichigo uses his own bankai, Tensa Zangetsu, which makes him incredibly fast. Ichigo evades Byakuya's bankai and stabs him with his sword. Meanwhile, Tōshirō Hitsugaya and Rangiku Matsumoto head to the Central 46 Chambers, the highest authority in the Soul Society.
59	18	"Conclusion of the Death Match! White Pride and Black Desire"; Transliteration: "Shitō Ketchaku! Shiroki Hokori to Kuroki Omoi" (Japanese: 死闘決着！白き誇りと黒き想い)	Jun'ya Koshiba	Masashi Sogo	Jun'ya Koshiba	November 22, 2005	April 13, 2008
Byakuya uses the second form of his bankai, summoning several rows of swords. As he and Ichigo continue to fight, Ichigo becomes progressively weaker as the strain from his bankai increases. His inner hollow takes over his body after Byakuya wounds him, and he starts to overwhelm Byakuya. However, Ichigo manages to suppress his inner hollow, and regains control over his body. Both Ichigo and Byakuya focus the remainder of their powers and clash in a final strike, with Ichigo the victor. Byakuya reveals that he would allow Rukia to be executed because he values the law above her life "once a criminals punishment has been decided it must be carried out", and admits defeat, claiming that Ichigo has convinced him not to execute Rukia. Elsewhere, Hitsugaya and Matsumoto enter the Central 46 Chambers.
60	19	"Reality of the Despair, the Assassin's Dagger Is Swung"; Transliteration: "Zetsubō no Shinjitsu, Furiorosareta Kyōjin" (Japanese: 絶望の真実、振り下ろされた凶刃)	Kazunori Mizuno	Genki Yoshimura	Akio Kawamura	December 6, 2005	April 20, 2008
Hitsugaya and Matsumoto enter the Central 46 Chambers to find all of its occupants slain. Kira arrives, and Hitsugaya and Matsumoto pursue him. Hitsugaya returns when Kira tells him that Hinamori has entered the Central 46 Chambers. Ichimaru meets Hinamori and takes her further into the chambers, where she is reunited with Aizen. Aizen impales Hinamori with his sword, and Aizen and Ichimaru leave the chamber. Hitsugaya arrives, and is enraged at Hinamori's state. He uses his bankai, but Aizen effortlessly defeats him. Unohana appears, denouncing Aizen after discovering that he is a traitor. Aizen then informs her that every Soul Reaper has been under the hypnosis of his zanpakutō, with the exception of the blind Tōsen, Aizen's other accomplice.
61	20	"Aizen Stands! Horrible Ambitions"; Transliteration: "Aizen, Tatsu! Osorubeki Yabō" (Japanese: 藍染、立つ！恐るべき野望)	Akira Shimizu	Masahiro Ōkubo	Tetsuya Endō	December 13, 2005	April 27, 2008
At Unohana's command, Isane Kotetsu informs all high-ranking members of the Thirteen Court Guard Squads of Aizen's duplicity. Aizen arrives at Rukia's execution site, where Tōsen has brought Rukia and Renji. When Aizen asks Renji to leave Rukia, he refuses and begins to fight Aizen. Ichigo also arrives, and the two fight in unison against Aizen. Aizen defeats both of them, and begins to explain his reasons for betraying the Soul Society until he is interrupted by Komamura.
62	21	"Gather Together! Group of the Strongest Shinigami!"; Transliteration: "Shūketsuseyo! Saikyō no Shinigami Shūdan" (Japanese: 集結せよ！最強の死神集団)	Hodaka Kuramoto	Masashi Sogo	Tetsuhito Saitō	December 20, 2005	May 4, 2008
Aizen defeats Komamura with an extremely powerful kidō spell and continues his explanation by revealing he arranged Rukia's execution to obtain the Hōgyoku, an orb that would allow him to gain hollow powers that was hidden in Rukia's gigai by Urahara. After extracting the Hōgyoku from her body, Aizen orders Ichimaru to kill Rukia before Byakuya saves her as the majority of the Thirteen Court Guard Squads then arrive to restrain Aizen. But Aizen and his accomplices use several hollows to escape into the hollows' world Hueco Mundo. Afterwards, as Byakuya recovers, he explains to Rukia that he married her sister, Hisana, and adopted Rukia into the Kuchiki clan as Hisana's dying wish. But explaining that as he promised his parents to uphold the law without question as he broke his clan's rules in adopting her, Byakuya admits that he was conflicted between following the rules and allowing Rukia's execution or breaking them to save her.
63	22	"Rukia's Resolution, Ichigo's Feelings"; Transliteration: "Rukia no Ketsui, Ichigo no Omoi" (Japanese: ルキアの決意、一護の想い)	Shigeki Hatakeyama	Masashi Sogo	Shigeki Hatakeyama	January 10, 2006 (Note: Episode 63 was an hour-long special.)	May 11, 2008
After a clip show in which the events of the arc are recounted, Ichigo and his friends return to the human world. However, Rukia decides to remain in the Soul Society rather than leave with Ichigo.
