= List of Soul Reapers in Bleach =

This is a list of Soul Reapers (死神, Shinigami; literally, "death gods") featured in the manga and anime series Bleach, created by Tite Kubo. Soul Reapers are a fictional race of spirits who govern the flow of souls between the human world and the afterlife realm called the Soul Society.

The series tells of how Ichigo Kurosaki becomes a Substitute Soul Reaper in Karakura Town in place of Rukia Kuchiki. He assumes her duties to protect souls and put them to peaceful rest, as well as to fight against dangerous and lost souls unable to find rest, called Hollows.

As the series progresses, Rukia is captured by the Soul Society's Soul Reaper military for giving her powers to Ichigo and sentenced to death. Ichigo and his friends journey to the Soul Society to save her and are forced to fight against many of the Court Guard Squads. Sousuke Aizen, Gin Ichimaru, and Kaname Tōsen—the captains of squads Five, Three, and Nine respectively—eventually defect from the Soul Society at the time of Rukia's rescue, effectively interrupting Ichigo's battles, and enact a plan to gain greater power with the Arrancar. Aizen is brought into focus as the story's primary antagonist. However, in the series' final arc, the real primary antagonist is revealed to be Yhwach, the son of the Soul King and father of the Quincy.

== Creation and conception ==
Bleach was first conceived from Tite Kubo's desire to draw Shinigami ("Soul Reaper" in the English adaptations) in a kimono, which formed the basis for the design of the Soul Reapers. Before deciding on the use of kimono, Kubo thought of giving black suits to male Soul Reapers and any forms to female Soul Reapers, but thought that it was too generic and changed it to a kimono. Several characteristics from them, such as the kidō spells and the zanpakutō swords are also based on Japanese literature. Instead of using zanpakutō, Kubo wanted to give the Soul Reapers guns, with the exception of Rukia Kuchiki, who would use a scythe. Seeing that guns are not suitable for kimono, he changed them to swords. When asked which of the Court Guard Squad captains and assistant captains were his favorites, Kubo answered by saying that he liked "all of them" and that he likes to "support" characters "disliked by readers." Early plans for the story did not include the hierarchical structure of the Soul Society, but did include Ichigo's Soul Reaper heritage.

== Characteristics ==
Soul Reapers can only be seen by other spiritually aware beings, which excludes most humans. They age at a much slower rate than humans and can be injured and die, yet are able to resist most injuries unless considerably great.

All Soul Reapers possess a zanpakutō (斬魄刀; lit. "soul-cutting sword"), a katana which reflects aspects of the user's soul and personality. A zanpakutō has a symbiotic connection with its owner, its spiritual embodiment possessing similar traits to its owner and evolving to reflect its Soul Reaper's power. By learning the name of the sword's spirit, and through training, Soul Reapers can unlock more powerful transformations of their zanpakutō. The first transformation, known as a shikai (始解; lit. "initial release") which acts like a binding contract between a Soul Reaper and the sword, changes the zanpakutō's appearance to so the owner can facilitate its special abilities to its fullest. The second transformation, known as bankai (卍解; lit. "final release"), is an ability normally seen in Soul Reaper captains that requires ten years minimum to master. Once achieved, the Soul Reaper can unlock the full potential of their zanpakutō, increasing their own power several times over. Many Soul Reapers manage to use kidō (鬼道; lit. "way of the demon", also "demon arts"), a form of magic that can be performed by reciting a specific incantation. Most of the kidō spells seen in the series are used as attacks, defensive measures, or to bind others, though they can also serve more specialized needs such as healing wounds or communication over long distances. Spells are ranked on a scale from 1 to 99, indicating their complexity and overall power. Low-level spells can, however, be very effective when performed by a skilled kidō user, such as Byakuya Kuchiki.

Soul Reaper operations are based out of the Soul Society, which is an afterlife realm in Bleach maintained by a being known as the Soul King. Travel between the human world and the Soul Society is extremely limited and monitored, but some Soul Reapers are stationed in the human world to carry out their duties. If this Soul Reaper is an assistant captain or a captain then they will have a Gentei Reiin, or a Spirit Restriction Seal, on some area of their body. This seal will limit their spiritual powers to one-fifth of their full power and it can only be released in a state of emergency. In addition to these laws, it is a crime for a Soul Reaper to remain in the human world for longer than directed. A Soul Reaper's duties include leading wandering spirits to the Soul Society by giving a Konso (魂葬 (こんそう), konsō; "soul funeral") to souls yet to become hollows and defeat those who have. High-level Soul Reapers and similarly powerful beings are able to levitate by standing on the spiritual energy in the air. The No Breathes From Hell one shot explains that Soul Reaper captains are given a last rites ritual as their Reishi is transferred to another realm due to being too dense to properly diffuse in the Soul Society. The ritual is revealed to actually send the deceased Soul Reaper captains to Hell instead, rather than ease their passing.

== Soul Reaper court divisions ==
The thirteen Soul Reaper captains.

The thirteen Soul Reaper lieutenants.

The Gotei Thirteen (護廷十三隊, Goteijūsantai; "Thirteen Court Guard Squads" in the English dubbed version) is the central organization, and main military power, of the Soul Society that most Soul Reapers join. Initially created to enforce law and order and composed of the deadliest killers in all of the Soul Society, the Gotei Thirteen became more peace-oriented in nature over time. It is split into thirteen squads, each symbolized by a flower whose floriography is indicative of the squad's designation or special responsibilities.

- Squad One (一番隊, Ichibantai; First Division in manga) – its flower is the chrysanthemum, meaning "immaculate".
- Squad Two (二番隊, Nibantai; Second Division in manga) – As its captain is also leader of the Stealth Force (隠密機動, Onmitsukidō; literally, "Hidden Secret Movements Organization"), Squad Two shares duties with said branch in surveillance, covert operations, imprisoning potentially problematic Soul Reapers, and assassinations. Its flower is the Pulsatilla cernua, meaning "splendor".
- Squad Three (三番隊, Sanbantai; Third Division in manga) – its flower is the Calendula officinalis, meaning "tranquility".
- Squad Four (四番隊, Yonbantai; Fourth Division in manga) – the medical and supply division. Its flower is the Gentiana scabra, meaning "fidelity" and "conscience".
- Squad Five (五番隊, Gobantai; Fifth Division in manga) – its flower is the Pieris japonica, meaning "sacrifice".
- Squad Six (六番隊, Rokubantai; Sixth Division in manga) – considered a model division by other Soul Reapers and known for its strict adherence to the rules. Its flower is the red Camellia japonica, meaning "righteous reason".
- Squad Seven (七番隊, Nanabantai; Seventh Division in manga) – its flower is the Japanese iris, meaning "kindness" and "vitality".
- Squad Eight (八番隊, Hachibantai; Eighth Division in manga) – its flower is the Strelitzia, meaning "getting everything I(one) want".
- Squad Nine (九番隊, Kyūbantai; Ninth Division in manga) – Squad Nine is always on standby as it is the security force of the Gotei Thirteen, also overseeing art and culture. Its flower is the white Papaver somniferum, meaning "oblivion".
- Squad Ten (十番隊, Jūbantai; Tenth Division in manga) – its flower is the Narcissus, meaning "selfishness".
- Squad Eleven (十一番隊, jūichibantai; Eleventh Division in manga) – also referred to as the Zaraki Corps. Squad Eleven is known for its brute military force with a specialization in sword-only combat, making them at loggerheads with Squad Four. Its flower is the Chinese yarrow, meaning "battle".
- Squad Twelve (十二番隊, Jūnibantai; Twelfth Division in manga) – a scientific research division and home to the Soul Reaper Research and Development Institute (SRDI) for 110 years. The squad was directly linked to the SRDI by its former Captain Kisuke Urahara. Its flower is the thistle, meaning "revenge", "rigorous" and "independence".
- Squad Thirteen (Note: believed to have been inspired by a real swordsman group in Japan, the Shinsengumi) (十三番隊, Jūsanbantai; Thirteenth Division) – its flower is the Galanthus nivalis, meaning "hope".

The Captains (隊長, taichō; literally, "unit commander") are the leaders of the thirteen squads. Each controls a specific squad with the exception of the Head Captain (総隊長, Sōtaichō; literally "Commander-General"), who is both the captain of Squad One and leader of the Gotei Thirteen; the implication is that this is an ex officio position. All captains are able to perform the bankai of their zanpakutō. To achieve the position of captain, a Soul Reaper must display great expertise with Soul Reaper abilities and battle tactics, and be approved by either their fellow captains or the members of their own squad. There are three ways a Soul Reaper can become a captain:

1. the captain proficiency test: requires the ability to perform bankai. Presumably, most Soul Reapers become captains using this method. At least three existing captains, including the Head Captain, must witness the test.
2. receiving personal recommendations from at least six captains and approval from at least three of the remaining seven.
3. defeating an existing captain one-on-one with at least 200 witnesses from the respective squad. Kenpachi Zaraki and Kenpachi Kiganjō are the only two known captains to have achieved their rank using this method.

The Lieutenants (副隊長, fukutaichō; literally, "vice-unit commander") are the adjutants to the captains in each squad. In terms of rank, they hold the second seat in the squad. In the case of a squad captain's death, departure, or other circumstances making them unable to perform their duties, the lieutenant serves as acting captain until a new captain is assigned. The seated officers (席官, sekikan) hold ranks from third seat to twentieth. While single digit ranks are usually assigned to a single officer, the lower ranks are often held by several officers. Higher ranks may also lead secondary teams within a squad; for example, Hanatarō Yamada is the Seventh Seat Officer of Squad Four and leader of Advanced Relief Team Fourteen therein.

Outside of the Gotei Thirteen, other military forces exist and serve in specialized capacities. The Kidō Corps (鬼道衆, Kidōshū), for example, is a reclusive group that specializes in kidō and is in charge of the gateway connecting the Soul Society and the human world.

== Soul Reaper characters by squads ==
=== Squad One ===
==== Genryūsai Shigekuni Yamamoto ====
Genryūsai Shigekuni Yamamoto (山本元柳斎 重國, Yamamoto Genryūsai Shigekuni) was the captain of Squad One and Head Captain of the Gotei Thirteen. He believed that laws must be upheld for the benefit of the community and despised those who broke them, but made an exception regarding Ichigo Kurosaki due to a debt owed to the former after he saves the Soul Society. Yamamoto founded the Soul Reaper Academy 1,000 years before the main Bleach storyline, where he personally instructed Shunsui Kyōraku and Jūshirō Ukitake whom he treated like sons. Yamamoto claimed that no Soul Reaper born in the last one thousand years is stronger than him, but he is eventually killed by Yhwach.

His zanpakutō is Ryūjin Jakka (流刃若火; lit. "Flame of the Flowing Blade"), and it displays control over flame. The most powerful zanpakutō in Soul Society, the sheer power of its flame can disintegrate almost anything it is waved at. Its release command is "Reduce All Creation to Ash" (万象一切灰燼と為せ, Banshō issai kaijin to nase or "All things in the universe, Turn to ashes" in the English Dub). Ryūjin Jakka's bankai is Zanka no Tachi (残火の太刀; lit. "Longsword of the Remnant Flame"). Upon release, all of the flames produced by Yamamoto become concentrated at the edge of the blade, which takes on the appearance of an ancient, scorched sword. Zanka no Tachi's heat reaches temperatures of 15,000,000 degrees, creating flame-like reiatsu around him and rendering him untouchable. Merely activating it drains all the moisture in Soul Society. The Squad Ten captain, Tōshirō Hitsugaya, cannot release his sword—an ice-type zanpakutō—due to the heat radiated from Yamamoto's bankai. Its power is so great that it can destroy all of Soul Society and Yamamoto himself should it remain active for too long.

Yamamoto is voiced by Masaaki Tsukada in the original Japanese anime series and Binbin Takaoka in its direct sequel Thousand Year Blood War. In the English dub, he is voiced by Neil Kaplan.

==== Chōjirō Sasakibe ====
Chōjirō Tadaoki Sasakibe (雀部 長次郎 忠息, Sasakibe Chōjirō Tadaoki), was Yamamoto's lieutenant, often present during meetings between the captains. He was the only Soul Reaper at the battle for Karakura Town that did not fight, instead guarding the fake version of the town on his own with a large Reiatsu barrier. In an omake, due to a mission in the real world, Sasakibe is shown to have enjoyed growing tea leaves and making his own tea. He was killed by the Stern Ritter "O" Driscoll Berci during the Wandenreich's first invasion of the Soul Society, alongside 106 other Soul Reapers. Driscoll later attempts to also kill Yamamoto using Sasakibe's stolen bankai, but is obliterated by the enraged captain for using his deceased lieutenant's bankai so shamefully. During Sasakibe's funeral, it is revealed that he had achieved his bankai before Yamamoto's pupils Shunsui and Jūshirō did, though due to his loyalty to Yamamoto he never used it or offered to be a captain.

His zanpakutō is Gonryōmaru (厳霊丸; lit. "Stern Spirit", translated in other ways). When released with the command "Bite" (穿て, Ugate), it transforms into a rapier. Its shikai special abilities remain unknown. Gonryōmaru's bankai is Kōkō Gonryō Rikyū (黄煌厳霊離宮; lit. "Stern Spirit's Yellow-Glittering Detached Palace"), which produces a bolt of lightning from its blade that extends and transforms into a dome of lightning, stationed far above one's head, that is fastened to the ground by a large number of lightning pillars. These pillars can be controlled at will to shock an opponent.

He is voiced by Taro Yamaguchi in the original Japanese version of the anime and his younger version in the Thousand-Year Blood War arc is voiced by Ryōta Suzuki. In the English dub, he is voiced by Michael McConnohie when he first speaks in Episode 54 then by Dan Woren in later appearances.

==== Shunsui Kyōraku ====
Shunsui Sakuranosuke Jirō Kyōraku (京楽 次郎 総蔵佐 春水, Kyōraku no Jirō Sakuranosuke Shunsui) was originally the captain of Squad Eight for most of the series. One of the oldest captains in the Soul Society, alongside his friend Jūshirō, Shunsui trained under Head Captain Yamamoto, whom he calls "Old-man Yama" (山じい, Yama-jii). After Yamamoto's death, Shunsui becomes the new Head Captain of the Gotei Thirteen and the leader of Squad One. He appoints Genshirō Okikiba and Nanao as his lieutenants.

A laid-back and flamboyant man, as seen by his attire, Shunsui wears a straw hat and a pink flowered haori over his captain's uniform. In his off time, he can be found drinking sake, napping, or chasing after women, particularly his lieutenant Nanao Ise. Shunsui tends to use a more familiar speech style than most other characters in Bleach, generally referring to his fellow captains and Soul Reapers by their first name, usually followed by an honorific. He is a peace-loving man, always seeking a nonviolent solution first, but will not refuse to fight as he does not wish to insult his opponents. An adept fighter, he defeats the Number One Espada, Coyote Starrk, using only his shikai.

Unlike other Soul Reapers, Shunsui possesses paired zanpakutō called Katen Kyōkotsu (花天狂骨; lit. "Bones of Heavenly Blooming Madness"). While the blades are normally two daisho swords, their shikai state resembles dao or falchions. When released with the command "Flower Wind Rage and Flower God Roar, Heavenly Wind Rage and Heavenly Demon Sneer" (花風紊れて花神啼き 天風紊れて天魔嗤う, Hana Kaze Midarete Kashin Naki, Tenpū Midarete Tenma Warau), Katen Kyōkotsu gains the ability to turn children's games into a deadly reality and anyone caught in the range of Shunsui's spiritual power is forced to play. One such game, Bushō Goma (不精独楽; Lazy Spinning Top), involves spinning wind around like a top. Another, Takaoni (嶄鬼; Mountain Demon), declares that whoever is the highest is the winner. A third technique, Kageoni (影鬼; Shadow Demon), forces the players to alter their own shadows; whoever steps on a shadow, even if it is their own, is declared the loser. The fourth game is known as Iro-Oni (艶鬼; Colored Demon), where players call out a color then slice their opponent wherever that color is displayed. However, if the color is not on the body of the person who called it out then the damage given is minimal; the more prevalent the declared color is on the declarer's body, the more damage the attack commits. A fifth game, similar to "Red Light, Green Light", is called Daruma-san ga Koronda (だぁるまさん が こぁろんだ; The Dharma Doll Fell Down). The sixth and final game, Kageokuri (影送り; Silhouette Sending), is one where if a person stares hard enough at another person's shadow, then their opponent creates afterimages of themselves.

Katen Kyōkotsu's bankai is called Katen Kyōkotsu: Karamatsu Shinjū (花天狂骨枯松心中; "Heavenly Bloom Madness Bone: Withered Pine Lovers' Suicide"), which Shunsui uses only when his allies are at a safe distance from himself. When released, it covers a large area around him in an aura that affects others perception of the surrounding environment, causing them to see it as darkened, bleak, and gloomy, and feel varying levels of melancholy and despair. While it maintains its shikai form, its bankai allows Shunsui to manifest various stories, which can kill an opponent easily; damage is meted out in four separate Acts. It also manifests the spirit of Shunsui's zanpakutō: a Feudal Japan-style mistress referred to as Katen, who creates a kunoichi offshoot named Kyōkotsu to hold Shinken Hakkyōken (Note: a sacred ceremonial sword belonging to the Ise clan) until Nanao eventually asks for it.

He is voiced by Akio Otsuka in the original Japanese version of the anime and by Ayane Sakura^{Ep. 373 credits} as a child while Steve Kramer voices him in the English dub, while Alejandro Saab voices him as a child.

==== Nanao Ise ====
Nanao Ise (伊勢 七緒, Ise Nanao) was originally the lieutenant of Squad Eight for most of the series, serving under her uncle, Shunsui. Nanao's family is primarily composed of women with a Shinto priesthood lineage and a reputation that men who marry into the family, like Shunsui's brother, eventually die due to a family curse. As a child, living with elderly relatives after her mother is executed for discarding Shinken Hakkyōken in the aftermath of her father's death, Nanao joins the Gotei Thirteen for her knowledge in kidō. During her early days in Squad Eight, she develops a friendship with then-lieutenant Lisa Yadōmaru, and realizes her family's zanpakutō is in Shunsui's possession. Nanao is a very serious and pragmatic person, which often puts her at odds with her captain's silly antics. Despite this, she is extremely respectful of him and follows his instructions without hesitation. Nanao is often accosted by Shunsui, whose teasing takes various forms, and removes her glasses when she is particularly annoyed with him. Though her face has never been shown while doing so, this act is apparently quite frightening as most characters who witness it are reduced to gibbering wrecks afterwards. When Shunsui becomes the new Head Captain, Nanao becomes his lieutenant in Squad One alongside Okikiba. While she creates a special kidō, Hakudan Keppeki, capable of blocking the Wandenreich during their second invasion of the Soul Society, Nanao eventually convinces Shunsui to give Shinken Hakkyōken to her.

Nanao's zanpakutō is Shinken Hakkyōken (神剣八鏡剣; lit. "Holy Sword Eight-Mirror Sword"), a family heirloom used in the Ise clan's rites and rituals. Unlike other Soul Reapers, members of the Ise clan lack zanpakutō and only the family head can inherit Shinken Hakkyōken. Nanao is rarely seen with the weapon for most of the story until Shunsui's battle with Lille Barro—he sealed the zanpakutō inside Kyōkotsu to honor his sister-in-law's wish to hide the apparent source of the Ise clan's curse from Nanao in the hopes that it would end with her generation. As Shinken Hakkyōken is able to harm divine beings, Shunsui gives the bandaged zanpakutō to Nanao as a last resort, which she accepts despite being skeptical of it. In its shikai state, Shinken Hakkyōken takes the form of an ornate, medium-sized, flat-ended bladeless sword with the ability to take the power of a god into itself and disperse that power into the eight directions. The weapon is seen in its basic unwrapped form in the art book All Colour but the Black, appearing as either a wakizashi or a tantō.

She is voiced by Hitomi Nabatame in the original Japanese version of the anime and by Kate Higgins in the English dub.

==== Genshirō Okikiba ====
Genshirō Okikiba (沖牙 源志郎, Okikiba Genshirō) was originally the Third Seat in Squad One, ordered by Yamamoto to guard their barracks during the Wandenreich's attack on the Soul Society. After Yamamoto's death, he is selected by Shunsui to be his lieutenant along with Nanao. After the imbalance of the souls in the Three Worlds start causing major distortions, he coordinates a strike force with the remaining Soul Reapers who did not go up to the Soul Palace to exterminate the invading Hollows in the Human World.

==== Shin'etsu Kisaragi ====
Shin'etsu Kisaragi (如月 信越, Kisaragi Shin'etsu) was a member of Squad One and the father of Shūsuke Amagai. (Note: Shūsuke appears in the anime series only.) After Central 46 denies Yamamoto's request to officially investigate the Kasumiōji Clan Compound regarding the clan's manufacturing of Bakkōtō, he sends Shin'etsu to secretly infiltrate the compound. Shin'etsu is caught by Gyōkaku Kumoi's men and Kumoi forces a Bakkōtō upon him. Under Kumoi's control, Shin'etsu returns to Yamamoto and attacks him, forcing the latter to kill him in self-defense during their fight. Shūsuke discovers his father's dying body and hears his last words: "Beware the Bakkōtō".

He is voiced by Hōchu Otsuka in the origiginal Japanese version of the anime and by Joe Ochman in the English dub.

=== Squad Two ===
Originally led by Yoruichi Shihōin, who combined her group's duties with the Stealth Force (隠密機動, Onmitsukidō; lit. "Special Forces"), Squad Two's duties include assassination and covert operations. After Yoruichi is forced to leave her post for aiding Urahara's escape when he was accused of the Hollowification of the Vizards, Suì-Fēng becomes the new captain of Squad Two.

==== Marenoshin Ōmaeda ====
Marenoshin Ōmaeda (大前田 希ノ進, Ōmaeda Marenoshin) is the former lieutenant of Squad Two (under Yoruichi) as well as the former Captain of the Special Forces Patrol Corps, appearing in the Turn Back the Pendulum gaiden. When he retires his positions, both are assumed by his son Marechiyo, the division's current lieutenant, with whom he shares a close resemblance. Like his son, Marenoshin enjoys downgrading poorer members of the Gotei Thirteen, such as Izuru Kira and Shūhei Hisagi.

==== Suì-Fēng ====
Suì-Fēng (砕(ソイ)蜂(フォン), Soifon; pinyin: Suì Fēng), born Fon Shaolin (蜂梢(フォンシャオ)綾(リン), Fon Shaorin; pinyin: Fēng Shāolíng), is the captain of Squad Two and the current Commander in Chief of the Stealth Force. She is a hard worker who believes strongly in following orders. She is also outwardly antagonistic to her underlings as she believes this keeps them on their toes. During her childhood, she serves as a bodyguard and eventual protégé of Yoruichi, with whom she develops a close relationship. When Yoruichi leaves the Soul Society, Suì-Fēng is crushed by her apparent abandonment. When Yoruichi returns to the Soul Society a century later, Suì-Fēng engages her in battle, but does not manage to defeat her. After questioning Yoruichi as to why she was left behind—Yoruichi's response is not heard—the two make amends. Their relationship becomes somewhat of a running gag: Suì-Fēng likes anything resembling a black cat (a form Yoruichi can assume at will) and displays jealousy whenever Yoruichi is in someone else's company.

Suì-Fēng's zanpakutō is Suzumebachi (雀蜂; literally translated as "Hornet"). When released by the command "Sting all Enemies to Death" (尽敵螫殺, Jinteki Shakusetsu), it shrinks into a black and gold stinger that is worn on the middle finger of her right hand. When it stabs an opponent, a butterfly-like symbol called a hornet's crest (蜂紋華, hōmonka) appears on their body at the point of contact. The crest bears four wings because a hornet has two sets of full-size wings located on its thorax. Due to Suì-Fēng's training, this mark can be kept there for as long as she desires. If Suzumebachi stabs the same location a second time, the opponent dies. This technique is called "Nigeki Kessatsu (弐撃決殺, Death in Two Steps)". This also holds true if an internal organ is pierced in the same location, regardless of the point of entry into the body. Furthermore, if Suì-Fēng is infected with a foreign poison, she can stab herself with her zanpakutō to counteract the new poison with her own, neutralizing it.

Suzumebachi's bankai is Jakuhō Raikōben (雀蜂雷公鞭; lit. "Hornet Thunder Whip", 雷公 means thunder). A gold artillery-type weapon with black markings, it takes the form of an extremely long, armored missile launcher that encases Suì-Fēng's right arm and extends all the way up past her shoulder, with a sighting device shaped like a mask shielding the right side of her face. While holding this bankai, its large size—it is bigger than Suì-Fēng herself—makes it difficult for her to move. The thunderous recoil after its cannon is fired may require the use of a Ginjōtan (銀条反; lit. "Cloth of Inverted Silver") (Note: a steel sash normally worn as a layer beneath armor. During her fight with the Number Two Espada, Baraggan Luisenbairn, Suì-Fēng wraps a Ginjōtan around the base of the building she is standing on and secures its other end around her waist to anchor her prior to firing her bankai at him.) beforehand or someone to reduct. Suì-Fēng has stated that she can normally only use her bankai once every three days without issue. Using it more than once in a day, while possible, drains considerable amounts of her spirit energy. A second shot would exhaust her to the point where her speed and maneuverability become seriously impaired, an anathema to her fighting style which requires high levels of both. Outside of her weapon, Suì-Fēng utilizes a combination of hand-to-hand combat and shunpo (瞬歩; flash steps) (Note: a high-speed movement ability) to engage opponents. She has also reformed the secret art of Shunkō (瞬開; lit. Flash War Cry), (Note: a technique originally created by Yoruichi that combines the use of Hakuda with kidō) developing a wind-based variation of the technique, a further indicator of her mastery of close combat methods.

In the original Japanese version of the anime, Suì-Fēng was voiced by Tomoko Kawakami until episode 182, then Houko Kuwashima for the rest of the series. In the English dub, she is voiced by Karen Strassman.

==== Marechiyo Ōmaeda ====
Marechiyo Ōmaeda (大前田 希千代, Ōmaeda Marechiyo) is the lieutenant of Squad Two and Captain of the Special Forces Patrol Corps. He comes across as arrogant and dull. In an omake, he is shown to have come from a rich family, where he is revealed to have a ridiculously long name: Marechiyo Yoshiayamenosuke Nikkōtarōemon Ōmaeda (大前田 日光太郎右衛門 美菖蒲介 希千代, Ōmaeda Nikkōtarōemon Yoshiayamenosuke Marechiyo). Other characters suspect that he received his position as a lieutenant because of his family's influence. Despite his dense and foolish attitude, he is a skilled tactician, not above putting himself in danger for his duty, and only feigns weakness and stupidity to lull his opponents into underestimating him, using this to aid in his near victory over one of Sousuke Aizen's Arrancar.

Marechiyo's zanpakutō is Gegetsuburi (五形頭; roughly "Five heads"), and is released by the command "Crush" (打っ潰せ, buttsubuse). It transforms into an oversized flail that can be thrown to inflict great physical damage upon his opponents. He is yet to obtain his bankai.

He is voiced by Shōto Kashii in the original Japanese version of the anime and Lex Lang in the English dub.

=== Squad Three ===
Squad Three was originally led by Rōjūrō "Rose" Otoribashi until he was forced to forfeit his post after Aizen put him through Hollowification. Gin Ichimaru, formerly Aizen's lieutenant in Squad Five, takes over Rose's position after Aizen reveals his true intentions and defects. Following Gin's subsequent defection, Lieutenant Kira briefly assumes captain duties. In the anime, Shūsuke Amagai is eventually assigned as captain in Gin's place, retaining the role until his death some time afterwards. Rose is allowed to resume his duties after Aizen's defeat.

==== Chikane Iba ====
Chikane Iba (射場 千鉄, Iba Chikane) is the former lieutenant of Squad Three under Rōjūrō, appearing in the Turn Back the Pendulum gaiden. She eventually retired from her position and was succeeded by Izuru. Chikane is the mother of the current lieutenant of Squad Seven, Tetsuzaemon Iba.

==== Gin Ichimaru ====
Gin Ichimaru (市丸 ギン, Ichimaru Gin) is the former captain of Squad Three. He previously served as the Third Seat of Squad Five under Captain Shinji Hirako, then as lieutenant under Captain Aizen, before becoming captain of Squad Three. He eventually defects from the Gotei Thirteen alongside Aizen and Kaname Tousen, and becomes a commander in Aizen's Arrancar army. His initial betrayal of the Soul Society is later revealed to have been a rouse to get close to Aizen, whom he attempts to kill; Gin fails and dies instead.

In the series, Gin keeps his eyes perpetually narrowed to slits (a practice since childhood), rarely ever opening them fully, (Note: they are bright blue in color) and maintains a smile that gives him the resemblance of a snake. This makes him appear sinister and unsettling to those around him, as it often difficult to decipher his true thoughts, a fact he is aware of and occasionally uses to toy with others for his amusement.

Gin's zanpakutō is Shinso (神鎗, Divine Spear). When released with the command "Shoot to kill", Shinso's blade glows with white light and extends forward at incredible speeds. Gin can expand its length up to 100 times its original size, while increasing its force proportionally; accordingly, he calls it Hyapponzashi (hundred swords). His bankai is Kamishini no Yari (God-Killing Spear). Unlike other zanpakutō, Gin's does not change in appearance when his bankai is activated, but maintains its unreleased wakizashi form instead. Kamishini no Yari possesses the same abilities as its shikai, albeit to a much more powerful degree. It can extend itself up to 13 km in length and move 500 times faster than the speed of sound. It also contains a deadly poison that dissolves and breaks down cells. After stabbing an opponent with it, Gin can turn Kamishini no Yari's blade into dust inside their body, leaving a sliver of it within that, upon retreat, triggers cellular degeneration.

He is voiced by Kōji Yusa in the original Japanese version of the anime and Doug Erholtz in the English dub.

==== Izuru Kira ====
Izuru Kira (吉良 イヅル, Kira Izuru) (Note: romanized as "Iduru" in Bleach Official Character Book SOULs and other Japanese sources) is the lieutenant of Squad Three, formerly a member of squads Five and Four. He is a friend of Momo Hinamori and Renji Abarai from their days in the Soul Reaper academy, and the three often spend their free time together. Though loyal to his friends, Kira often places his duties as a lieutenant above them. He defends his captain-turned-traitor Gin from a grief-stricken Hinamori, and later calls himself a "monster" for having raised his sword against her. He subsequently comes to regret helping Gin defect from the Soul Society, and develops more of a depressed and pessimistic demeanor. During the Wandenreich invasion, Kira is mortally wounded by the Stern Ritter Bazz-B. However, he is revealed to have survived the attack and is later healed by Mayuri Kurotsuchi, allowing him to battle the multiple weakened bird cloned copies of Lille Barro's Vollständig.

Kira's zanpakutō is Wabisuke (侘助; lit. "Apology helper", translated in other medias "the penitent one" "Apologizer"). The shikai command is "raise your head" (面を上げろ, omote o agero). When released, Wabisuke straightens and its blade forms a three-sided square, becoming an angular hook. It has the ability to double the weight of whatever it strikes. The effect is cumulative, so each successive hit exponentially increases the weight of the target. After seven or eight blocked attacks, his opponents are unable to lift their own swords or even move their body, leaving them on the ground with their head bowed as though asking forgiveness. At this point Wabisuke's released form, a blade bent into a squared hook, comes into play, as it is used to decapitate the kneeling opponent, thus denying them forgiveness.

He is voiced by Takahiro Sakurai in the original Japanese version of the anime and by Grant George in the English dub.

==== Shūsuke Amagai ====
Shūsuke Amagai (天貝 繍助, Amagai Shūsuke) is an anime-exclusive character introduced as the new captain of Squad Three, following Gin's defection, during season nine. He has an unkempt appearance, is usually bright, lively, and unpretentious, and can become drunk on a single drink of alcohol. Because Shūsuke spent most of his Soul Reaper career away from the Soul Society as part of a patrol group, the members of Squad Three are mistrustful of him when he first arrives. He spends the episodes following his introduction trying to prove himself to them and the rest of the Soul Reapers by promoting teamwork between all the divisions. As the anime progresses, Shūsuke is quickly revealed to have ulterior motives, with his friendly attitude only being a means to further his plans. He joined the Gotei Thirteen in order to exact revenge upon Yamamoto for killing his father to keep the Bakkōtō a secret. After his various accomplices are slain in the Soul Society, Shūsuke takes the nuclei of their Bakkōtō and engages Yamamoto in battle. He ends up fighting Ichigo, while Rukia and the others rescue Princess Rurichiyo Kasumioji (whom he abducted after killing Kumoi), and is defeated. Upon learning the truth about his father's death, he takes his own life to atone for his misdeeds.

Shūsuke's zanpakutō is Raika (雷火; roughly "Lightning Flash"). The shikai command of his zanpakutō is "sever" (断ち切れ, tachikire). When released, it takes the form of a white hook sword with curved pipes that form the hilt. He can focus fireballs into the crux of the hook and create large fissures of flame to attack his opponents with by slamming it into the ground. Raika's bankai, Raika Gōen Kaku (雷火豪炎殻; literally "Lightning Flash Flame Shell"), enlarges the blade and creates a giant conch-shaped guard worn across Shūsuke's arm, with the handle of the blade hidden inside it. This form gives him greater control of his fire attacks, his most powerful technique creating giant dragons of fire to encircle and crush his foe. Shūsuke's Bakkōtō (獏爻刀, roughly "tapir crossing blade") is a twin-bladed tuning fork-shaped weapon that creates black-plated armor across his right arm and emits a green energy sword when activated. It negates any other active Soul Reaper zanpakutō abilities, forcing his opponents to rely on other powers.

He is voiced by Ken'yū Horiuchi in the original Japanese version of the anime and by Rick Zieff in the English dub.

==== Makoto Kibune ====
Makoto Kibune (貴船 理, Kibune Makoto) is an anime-exclusive character introduced during season nine, who joins Squad Three as the Third Seat. He is brought in by Captain Shūsuke. Makoto has brown hair and wears purple-rimmed glasses. While he outwardly appears friendly towards his subordinates, he is highly intolerant of failure, calling those who fall in battle "trash". When in training at the Soul Reaper academy, Makoto stood out as a highly gifted student, but his inability to function in a team prevented him from attaining rank in the Gotei Thirteen (a teammate getting injured during his attack on a hollow got him in trouble with Central 46). This led to his joining the patrol squads under Shūsuke instead. Around this time, he became a servant of Kumoi and gained a Bakkōtō. Though it gives him the necessary power to wreak havoc on the Soul Society, he eventually loses control of it and is killed by Kira.

Makoto's zanpakutō is Reppū (烈風; literally "Gale"). When released by the command "rampage" (荒れ狂え, are kurue), it takes the form of a large, two-bladed weapon. When combined with his Bakkōtō, he can telekinetically control the sword, allowing him to attack opponents from any direction and spin the blade like a saw blade.

He is voiced by Hikaru Midorikawa in the original Japanese version of the anime and by Christopher Corey Smith in the English dub.

=== Squad Four ===
==== Retsu Unohana ====
Retsu Unohana (卯ノ花 烈, Unohana Retsu) was the captain of Squad Four, one of the founding members of the Gotei Thirteen, and the first Kenpachi, a title granted to captains of Squad Eleven. Before becoming a captain, Unohana was regarded as the most diabolical criminal to ever grace the Soul Society, infamous for her sadistic bloodlust for battle. She invented the "Art of Killing" and gave herself the name "Yachiru Unohana" (卯ノ花 八千流, Unohana Yachiru) as part of her boast that she had mastered all kind of fighting arts. Unohana was desperate to find opponents who could challenge her satisfactorily until she battles Kenpachi Zaraki, whom she concedes as being stronger than her after he is able to scar her chest. For reasons unknown, after becoming the captain of Squad Four, Unohana adopts a more serene and soft-spoken maternal persona, never showing distress even in the most perilous situations and responding with sharp-minded thinking when things become demanding. She uses honorifics to address everyone, including her subordinates.

As the captain of Squad Four, Unohana excels in healing techniques—taught to her by Royal Guard member Tenjiro Kirinji—which she puts to use in treating the most severe injuries and performing major surgeries, normally on the captains and if necessary, lieutenants. Though always polite to her patients and subordinates, aspects of her true nature surface on occasion, with her mere presence intimidating her charges into submission if they try to leave her care before being fully healed or, in the English dub, if they complain about their treatment. She is also very good at noticing details, being the first to detect a slight abnormality in Aizen's fake corpse (later confirmed by Aizen himself). During the Battle of Karakura Town, she is one of the captains sent to assist Ichigo in Hueco Mundo and later accompanies him to the town through a Garganta, although she does not take part in the battle directly. Much later on, during the Wandenreich invasion, Unohana and all other members of her squad are ordered to remain in their barracks by Yamamoto. After Shunsui becomes the new Captain-Commander, she reassumes her true persona when asked to train Zaraki in what ultimately becomes a battle to the death. After repeatedly taking him to the brink of death and bringing him back to continue fighting, Unohana releases her bankai to complete Zaraki's "awakening". In the end, she is run through by Zaraki and dies, but is grateful she was able to serve her purpose and help him learn the name of his zanpakutō.

Unohana's zanpakutō is Minazuki (肉雫唼; roughly "Flesh Purifier"). In its sealed form it resembles a curved tachi. In its shikai, the entire sword transforms into a gigantic, flying, one-eyed creature resembling a manta ray. It has the ability to heal by swallowing the injured and recuperates them in its stomach. When Unohana reseals Minazuki, it dissolves into green mist in the sheath of her zanpakutō. Her bankai is Minazuki (皆尽, all things end; lit. "End of the World"). When activated it releases and fills the area around it with a pool of blood, turning her sword into a sword of blood. Unohana can use it to attack with streams of blood that have an acidic quality to them.

She is voiced by Aya Hisakawa in the original Japanese version of the anime and Kate Higgins in the English dub.

Unohana's character is inspired by the mysterious lover of Okita Sōji, the captain of the first unit of a Japanese swordsman group that existed during the 1860s known as the Shinsengumi. The unnamed woman is acknowledged as being a strong fighter and the daughter of a Western doctor.

==== Seinosuke Yamada ====
Seinosuke Yamada (山田 清之介, Yamada Seinosuke) is the former lieutenant of Squad Four who served one hundred years ago, during the Turn Back the Pendulum gaiden. He is also the older brother of Hanatarō Yamada. While much about Seinosuke is unknown, he is described as having a bad character, although he respects Captain Unohana very much. He later leaves his position.

==== Isane Kotetsu ====
Isane Kotetsu (虎徹 勇音, Kotetsu Isane) is the lieutenant and, after Unohana's death, captain of Squad Four. She is the older sister of Kiyone Kotetsu. Unlike Kiyone, Isane is generally quiet and observant and taller than average, though she shares her sister's sense of loyalty towards her captain. Unohana notes that Isane suffers from frequent and recurring nightmares. This is sometimes used as material for jokes as Isane's nightmares are often odd or whimsical in their contents. For example, she once had a nightmare that ended with her screaming "fish paste." She is very emotional by nature, crying after the Wandereich's first invasion of the Soul Society, and again when she finds Unohana's farewell note before the latter's fight to the death with Zaraki.

During the Soul Society Arc, Insane is present at Rukia's execution. When Ichigo appears, she attacks him, but is swiftly defeated. She is also present when Aizen reveals his true nature to Hitsugaya and Unohana, and quickly broadcasts the information to the rest of Soul Society. Isane is part of the reinforcements sent to Hueco Mundo in order to assist Ichigo and his friends. She and Unohana heal Yasutora "Chad" Sado and Gantenbainne Mosqueda after saving them from the Exequias. After Unohana heads to Fake Karakura Town, she orders Isane to assist captains Byakuya and Zaraki in battle against Espada Yammy Llargo. During the Wandenreich invasion of the Soul Society, Isane and the rest of Squad Four are ordered by Yamamoto to remain in their barracks.

Isane's zanpakutō is Itegumo (凍雲; literally "frozen cloud", translated in the English manga as "Frozen Snow") and its shikai command is "Sprint" (奔れ, Hashire). When released, two smaller blades protrude from Itegumo's hilt at 45° angles. Its special abilities, if any, remain unknown.

She is voiced by Yukana in the original Japanese version of the anime and Stephanie Sheh in the English dub.

==== Yasochika Iemura ====
Yasochika Iemura (伊江村 八十千和, Iemura Yasochika) is the Third Seat Officer of Squad Four and leader of Relief Team One, serving under Unohana. Despite his high rank, he addresses his fellow third-seat peers from other divisions with a -sama honorific suffix as he comes from the weakest squad in terms of combat. Iemura meticulously keeps a diary, which he sometimes defeats the purpose of by narrating what he is writing in it, particularly when lamenting something. He is quite proficient in the use of healing kidō and his speedy treatments are known to rival those of Isane's.

The name and abilities of Iemura's zanpakutō are unknown. He is only seen using his sword once in the manga, against a fellow squad member after the latter annoys him. His zanpakutō resembles a regular katana with a square shaped guard.

He is voiced by Yutaka Aoyama in the original Japanese version of the anime and Cam Clarke in the English dub.

==== Hanatarō Yamada ====
Hanatarō Yamada (山田 花太郎, Yamada Hanatarō) is the Seventh Seat Officer of Squad Four and leader of Relief Team Fourteen. Hanatarō is very timid and nervous, usually not thinking about what he is doing, and tends to be clumsy and easily duped. Despite his character, he is very talented in healing and treating, even displaying boldness at times, such as when as he risks his position as a Soul Reaper to help Rukia escape execution, and while healing Ichigo on several occasions. Instead of his zanpakutō, Hanatarō usually carries Squad Four's medical pack on his back, which he uses to heal others on the battlefield. Because he has strong relationships with Ichigo, Rukia and Renji, he is part of the reinforcements sent by the Gotei Thirteen to infiltrate Hueco Mundo and assist his fellow Soul Reapers in battle, presumably healing them once the battle is over. In Hueco Mundo, Hanatarō is assigned to Captain Byakuya instead of Unohana. While there, he is briefly injured by Rukia who was under Zommari Leroux's control at the time, but makes a full recovery and immediately resumes his duties. He is also known as the "Lil' Creepy Medical Kid".

Though Hanatarō does possess a zanpakutō, named Hisagomaru (瓠丸; "Gourd"), he tends to misplace it as he rarely needs to use it. When it strikes an opponent, Hisagomaru heals their wounds rather than causing them damage. A red gauge on the blade then fills depending on the severity of the healed wounds. Once the gauge is filled and it is released with the command "Fulfill" (満たせ, Mitase), Hisagomaru transforms into a scalpel and changes its name to Akeiro Hisagomaru (朱色瓠丸; "crimson gourd"). In this state, Hisagomaru unleashes a reiatsu-based attack (similar to kidō or cero) equal to the severity and number of wounds that have been healed. The proportion of its strength, if enough energy is stored, is nearly strong enough to decapitate a Menos. However, upon releasing these energies, Akiero Hisagomaru retains its scalpel form, rendering it effectively useless in hand-to-hand combat. It can also release the existing amount of energy collected within itself prior to being completely filled, though this is only mentioned and never actually seen. It is also the only known zanpakutō to have different names in its sealed and shikai forms.

Hanatarō was one of the selected higher officers ordered to transfer a partial amount of their own reiatsu to restore Ichigo's Soul Reaper power, although the order only applied to captains and lieutenants, implying that Hanatarō is on par with lieutenant level.

He is voiced by Kōki Miyata in the original Japanese version of the anime and Spike Spencer in the English dub.

=== Squad Five ===
Squad Five was originally led by Shinji Hirako until he was forced to forfeit his post to his then-lieutenant Sousuke Aizen after the latter put him through Hollowification. Following Aizen's defection, Lieutenant Momo Hinamori briefly takes over captain duties. Shinji is restored to the position after Aizen's defeat.

==== Momo Hinamori ====
Momo Hinamori (雛森 桃, Hinamori Momo) is the lieutenant of Squad Five. She is an upbeat, easy-going girl who is generally quite trusting, if not naive. She is a childhood friend of Captain Hitsugaya, who used to call her "bed-wetter Momo" in retaliation for her calling him "Shiro-chan" ("Lil' Shiro" in the English dub). She befriends Kira and Renji upon joining the Soul Reaper academy, and the three later join Squad Five under Captain Aizen. The only one of the three to remain with the squad, Hinamori develops a deep admiration and respect for her captain and goes into deep shock and denial after he tries to kill her and subsequently betrays the Soul Society, even suggesting in one of her mentally unstable moments that Gin is controlling him somehow. She later joins the rest of the Soul Society in fighting against Aizen, but still refers to him as "Captain" out of habit. During this battle, Aizen again causes Momo to become seriously injured by using his powers and fooling Hitsugaya into stabbing her in the chest. It is later revealed that she survives, undergoing organ regeneration under the supervision of Captain Kurotsuchi. The final Bleach arc shows Momo recovered and on good terms with her new captain, Shinji.

Momo's zanpakutō is Tobiume (飛梅; literally "Flying plum"). Her shikai command is "Snap" (弾け, hajike). When released, Tobiume' blade straightens and produces several jitte-like prongs along its length. In this form, Tobiume acts as a focus for Hinamori's spiritual power, concentrating it into energy bursts capable of cratering floors and breaching walls. She can also compress her power into massive energy balls and toss them from the blade's tip. To complement her kidō-based zanpakutō, Hinamori is noted to be talented with kidō spells as well, able to combine kidō abilities with her own zanpakutō to easily deal with three Arrancar at once.

She is voiced by Kumi Sakuma in the original Japanese version of the anime and Karen Strassman in the English dub.

=== Squad Six ===
==== Ginrei Kuchiki ====
Ginrei Kuchiki was the former captain of Squad Six and head of the Kuchiki Clan, one of the four great noble families of the Soul Society. He is the grandfather of Byakuya and the father-in-law of Koga Kuchiki.

Ginrei is voiced by Kinryū Arimoto in the original Japanese version of the anime and JB Blanc in the English dub.

==== Sōjun Kuchiki ====
Sōjun Kuchiki (朽木 蒼純, Kuchiki Sōjun) was the former lieutenant of Squad Six under Ginrei, appearing in the Turn Back the Pendulum gaiden. He is Ginrei's son and Byakuya's father. He had severe health issues, but still wanted to succeed his father as head of the Kuchiki Clan. Sōjun was later killed in action, and buried next to his wife.

==== Byakuya Kuchiki ====
Byakuya Kuchiki is the captain of Squad Six. He is also the head of the Kuchiki Clan and son of Sōjun. He married Rukia's sister Hisana over fifty years before the series begins, and later adopts Rukia into the clan in fulfillment of a promise made to his wife—to find and take care of her sister—prior to her death.

Extremely proficient in all forms of Soul Reaper combat, Byakuya holds the Advanced-Captain class within the Gotei Thirteen. He is also very skilled in the use of shunpo (having trained with Yoruichi) and kidō, able to cast high level spells up to number 81 without their incantation. His zanpakutō is Senbonzakura (千本桜; literally "Thousand cherry blossoms") and its shikai command is "Scatter" (散れ, chire). Byakuya's bankai is Senbonzakura Kageyoshi (千本桜景厳; literally "Vibrant Scape of a Thousand Cherry Blossoms"). Its release command is the same as its shikai.

He is voiced by Ryōtarō Okiayu in the original Japanese version of the anime and Dan Woren in the English dub, while Yuri Lowenthal voices him as a teenager.

==== Kōga Kuchiki ====
Koga Kuchiki was the former Third Seat Officer of Squad Six. He married into the Kuchiki Clan and was the son-in-law of Ginrei. Following a perceived betrayal, he eventually renounces all ties with the clan, and is sealed away by Yamamoto and Ginrei after the loss of his zanpakutō. Its spirit later returns and frees Koga, but he is ultimately killed by Byakuya.

A highly proficient swordsman, skilled in the use of kidō and shunpo—his abilities rivalled those of Byakuya—Koga possesses immense spiritual energy and impressive physical strength for a Soul Reaper that is neither a captain nor of the nobility. With his spiritual energy he can create invisible spiritual threads that immobilize his opponents and illusions that confound all five senses. Koga gains respect in the Soul Society for successfully leading attacks against rebel factions and eradicating them on his own. Yamamoto subsequently appoints him as captain of a special force, directly under Yamamoto's authority, dedicated solely to wiping out the remaining rebels. Koga's growing prowess and glory in battle prompts higher-ranking officials to frame and arrest him as a traitor. He is convicted, stripped of his rank, and sentenced to one hundred years of imprisonment, with his zanpakutō's powers additionally nullified. Ginrei later reveals to Koga that his punishment is actually because the officials fear how dangerous his zanpakutō has become and bades him accept the situation as a lesson in patience until Ginrei can prove his innocence. Koga eventually escapes with help from the physical manifestation of his zanpakutō and kills those responsible for his demise. When confronted by Ginrei, who does not sympathize his course of action, Koga suffers a breakdown and accuses Ginrei of being jealous of him all along, like the officials. He renounces his ties to the Kuchiki clan and embarks on a personal vendetta against the Soul Society, slaughtering any he considers enemies, including innocents. It is during this time that the breakdown of Koga's connection with his zanpakutō begins.

Koga's zanpakutō is Muramasa (村正; Village-Just), an illusion-type weapon that also possesses the ability to release other zanpakutō spirits from their wielders; it later orchestrates a zanpakutō rebellion. Its shikai command is "Whisper" (囁け, sasayake). When released, Muramasa glows purple and emits a similarly colored wave of energy that causes all nearby zanpakutō to turn against their wielders, enabling Koga to end conflicts without having to attack anyone himself. His bankai, Mukōjōchū Muramasa (無鉤条誅村正), allows Muramasa's spirit to manifest its true form (also named Muramasa) in the real world; this is preceded by the expulsion of a large volume spiritual energy which affects all nearby zanpakutō causing their own spirits to manifest. Muramasa may appear right beside Koga when summoned or at a distance away, as he is able to hear Koga's call wherever he is, and can manifest his sealed form as well as use his powers independently. Muramasa is also able to break into the inner world of an opponent and force their zanpakutō's spirit to submit to his will.

The connection between Koga and Muramasa degrades over time as the former becomes increasingly hateful and vengeful, overconfident in his abilities, and paranoid to the point of mental instability. Accessing his zanpakutō's power becomes difficult to almost impossible and, after Koga physically abuses Muramasa, it never responds to his call again, as the disconnect between them—Kōga believes a zanpakutō to be nothing more than a tool for killing, unequal to its wielder—grows too severe. Koga eventually breaks Muramasa's blade in two, considering the sword useless to one as powerful as himself. When confronted by Yamamoto and Ginrei, Muramasa does not come to Koga's aid as their connection is gone, and the two are able to seal Koga away. Hundreds of years later, in the Zanpakutō Rebellion arc, Muramasa returns after discovering that Koga is not actually dead and orchestrates a series of events in order to break the seal and release his old master. Upon freeing Koga, Muramasa offers his power to him once again, but Koga, believing Muramasa had abandoned him all this time, tries to kill him instead. Koga discards his sword entirely during a subsequent battle with Byakuya, who eventually kills him.

He is voiced by Isshin Chiba in the original Japanese version of the anime and David Vincent in the English dub.

=== Squad Seven ===
Squad Seven was originally led by Love Aikawa until he was forced to forfeit his post after Aizen put him through Hollowification. Sajin Komamura assumes Love's position as captain, and is later succeeded by Tetsuzaemon Iba.

==== Jin'emon Kotsubaki ====
Jin'emon Kotsubaki (小椿 刃右衛門, Kotsubaki Jin'emon) is the former lieutenant of Squad Seven under Captain Aikawa, appearing in the Turn Back the Pendulum gaiden. He is also the father of Sentarō Kotsubaki. Jin'emon later leaves his service for unknown reasons.

==== Sajin Komamura ====
Sajin Komamura (狛村 左陣, Komamura Sajin) is the captain of Squad Seven and a member of the Werewolf Clan. Once banished to the Animal Realm where they transformed into anthropomorphic wolves for committing various crimes, they managed to survive and eventually returned to the Soul Society while retaining their half-beast forms. Komamura is initially very self-conscious about his appearance and wears a large helmet that conceals his entire head, until it is destroyed during combat with Zaraki. From then on, he gains the confidence to show his face. Komamura's canine appearance is often the source of jokes. For example, when his lieutenant asks where to find a bathroom, Komamura appears to direct him to a fire hydrant, though he is in fact pointing at a bathroom just around the corner. Komamura has a close friendship with Tōsen and is shocked when the latter defects from the Soul Society, feeling that his friend has abandoned his morals. He resolves to return Tōsen to his senses with his own hands. However, after being made aware of his former friend's motives and ideology, Komamura realizes he has no choice but to fight Tōsen. Immensely strong, as demonstrated by his ability to hurl the Arrancar Poww's massive released state over his head and onto the ground, Komamura engages Tōsen in battle until the latter is defeated by Hisagi and dies. Later, during the Wandenreich invasion of the Soul Society, Komamura battles the Stern Ritter Bambietta Basterbine by releasing his bankai, which she steals from him. During the short break after the first invasion, he visits his werewolf grandfather to train, saying that he no longer feels ashamed of his ancestry. When the Wandenreich begin their second invasion, Komamura confronts Bambietta again and is able to retrieve his bankai through use of the Humanization Technique (Note: enables him to assume human form while remaining fully invincible, but at the cost of his heart) acquired from his grandfather. Once he beats Bambietta to within an inch of her life, the technique's effects wear off and Komamura regresses to the form of a small dog as Iba carries his body away. Ten years after the Wandenreich's invasion, Iba has replaced Komamura as captain as Komamura's whereabouts are unknown.

Komamura's zanpakutō is Tenken (天譴; literally "Judgement", translated in the English manga as "Sword of heavenly retribution"). Once released with the command "roar" (轟け, todoroke), Tenken creates various body parts of a giant that mimic whatever body part Komamura moves. For example, should Komamura swing his sword, a gigantic disembodied arm wielding a sword appears and does the same. Tenken's bankai, Kokujō Tengen Myō'ō (黒縄天譴明王; lit. "Vidyarāja of Kalasutra", translated in the English manga as "divine retribution, black ropes of ruination"), brings forth the entire giant, which also mimics Komamura's movements. Though extremely destructive, a major weakness of Komamura's bankai is that any damage inflicted on the giant is reflected upon Komamura, and any damage done to the giant's sword is reflected upon his zanpakutō, as seen when Aizen breaks Komamura's sword and severs his left arm. This weakness essentially makes it a bigger target to a strong enough opponent. According to Tōsen, Komamura's bankai is supposed to finish off the opponent in one hit, which could mean its weakness is to balance out its immense strength. While the weakness may seem overwhelming at first glance, Komamura and his bankai sharing one another's pain is also an advantage; because of the connection the two share, Komamura's bankai will heal at a rate proportional to how much he heals, making it the only bankai in the Soul Society capable of being restored without needing to be modified or reforged. After attaining the Human Transformation technique, Komamura's bankai gains a new ability, Dangai Jōe (断鎧縄衣, lit. "Armor Abandoned and Clad in Ropes"). In this form, the giant sheds its armor and becomes more agile and demonic in appearance. Due to the nature of the technique, the giant and Komamura become virtually immune to physical damage.

He is voiced by Tetsu Inada in the original Japanese version of the anime. In the English dub, he is voiced by Kim Strauss during the Soul Society Arc; JB Blanc from episodes 99 to 366; and Christopher Swindle from episode 370 onwards.

==== Tetsuzaemon Iba ====
Tetsuzaemon Iba (射場 鉄左衛門, Iba Tetsuzaemon) is the lieutenant, and later captain, (Note: Iba becomes captain ten years after the Wandenreich invasion.) of Squad Seven. He transferred from Squad Eleven after realizing that he would never be promoted to lieutenant if he remained there. Ikkaku Madarame has implied that becoming a lieutenant is a goal of Iba's because he desires to follow in his mother's (Chikane Iba) footsteps. His former squadmates look down on him for leaving, though Iba still enjoys a good fight and spending his free time with them. He and Ikkaku have a custom of dueling each other, drinking sake, then dueling again to see who has to get more sake. Iba has a distinctive hair cut and wears black sunglasses with his standard Soul Reaper uniform. He is well-rounded in both swordsmanship and kidō only because it made becoming a lieutenant easier.

The name of Iba's zanpakutō and its abilities are unknown. In its released state, his zanpakutō extends into a falchion or a large bladed scimitar with a pick-like protrusion a short distance below the tip of the sword.

He is voiced by Rintarou Nishi in the original Japanese version of the anime and by Neil Kaplan in the English dub.

==== Jirōbō Ikkanzaka ====
Jirōbō Ikkanzaka (一貫坂慈楼坊, Ikkanzaka Jirōbō) is the former Fourth Seat Officer of Squad Seven. He is the younger brother of Jidanbō Ikkanzaka, the gatekeeper who guards the entry to the city of Seireitei. He appears only once, fighting Uryū Ishida and Orihime Inoue after they enter Seireitei to rescue Rukia. He tries to kill Inoue, but is quickly defeated by Uryū, who pierces his Chain of Fate and Soul Sleep with arrows, resulting in the permanent loss of Jirōbō's Soul Reaper powers.

Jirōbō's zanpakutō is Tsunzakigarasu (劈烏, literally "Rending crow"). The shikai command is "flap away" (羽搏きなさい, habatakinasai), or "Spread Your Wings" in the English dub. It consists of countless flying curved blades, which he can control using telekinesis. Although the blades move faster than the eye can see, they can be easily destroyed or dodged using Flash Step or other fast-moving techniques.

He is voiced by Kazuhiro Nakata in the original Japanese version of the anime and by Peter Lurie in the English dub.

=== Squad Eight ===
Squad Eight was originally led by Shunsui Kyōraku until his promotion to Head Captain and subsequent transfer to Squad One with his lieutenant Nanao. Lisa Yadōmaru was the squad's original lieutenant under Shunsui, prior to her forced Hollowification by Aizen, which resulted in her removal from the post. Sometime after the Wandenreich invasion, Lisa returns to the Soul Society and once again becomes the captain of Squad Eight.

==== Yuyu Yayahara ====
Yuyu Yayahara (八々原 熊如, Yayahara Yuyu) is the young, new lieutenant of the 8th Division of the Gotei 13 under Captain Lisa Yadōmaru, introduced during the Echoing Jaws of Hell arc chapter. She is a dark-skinned gyaru with blonde hair and purple highlights and has a cheerful personality. She is a fierce combatant with enhanced physical prowess and her zanpakutō gives her ursine traits and attacks in shikai form.

==== Tatsufusa Enjōji ====
Tatsufusa Enjōji (円乗寺 辰房, Enjōji Tatsufusa) is the Third Seat Officer of Squad Eight. When Ichigo and his friends invade the Soul Society to rescue Rukia, Tatsufusa tries to prevent Chad from reaching her, but is defeated by him instead.

He is voiced by Toshiharu Sakurai in the original Japanese version of the anime and Kim Strauss in the English dub.

=== Squad Nine ===
Squad Nine was originally led by Kensei Muguruma until he and his lieutenant, Mashiro Kuna, were put through Hollowification by Aizen and forced to forfeit their posts. Tōsen assumes the role of Captain until Aizen reveals his true intentions then defects alongside him. Hisagi briefly takes over captain duties then becomes a co-lieutenant when Kensei and Mashiro return after Aizen's defeat to resume their roles.

==== Kaname Tōsen ====
Kaname Tōsen (東仙 要, Tōsen Kaname) was the captain of Squad Nine at the beginning of the series, formerly its Fifth Seat Officer during the Turn Back the Pendulum gaiden.

Blind since birth, Tōsen is capable of using his spiritual sense to "see". He is an extremely calm and serious pacifist whose motto is "take the path with the least bloodshed", an ideal adopted from a close friend of his, though he does not refrain from fighting for what he believes in or to preserve justice. He later becomes disillusioned with the Soul Society after his friend's murderer—her husband Tokinada Tsunayashiro—is unjustly allowed to go free, and feels compelled to join in Aizen's defection at the conclusion of the Soul Society arc. Tōsen undergoes Hollowification sometime prior to the battle of Fake Karakura Town. This is revealed when he completely transforms into a Hollow during his subsequent fight against Komamura. Too consumed by the ecstasy of having sight for the first time in his life, he is struck down by Hisagi and reverts to human form. Barely clinging to life, he is granted closure by Komamura and asks to see Hisagi's face one last time, but his body explodes before they can reunite as Aizen allows his Soul Suicide to occur.

Tōsen's zanpakutō is called Suzumushi (清虫; literally "pure insects", but read as "cricket"; translated in the English manga as "bell cricket"). Its abilities are vibrations. In its shikai, Suzumushi releases a high-pitched tone that renders anyone who hears it unconscious. Its second form, Benihiko, creates a trail of hundreds of blades that rain down on his opponent(s). His sword's bankai state, Suzumushi Tsuishiki Enma Korogi, allows Tōsen to create a sensory deprivation dome around himself and his opponent(s). After being modified by Aizen, Tōsen gains the powers of a Vizard and uses his Resurrección Suzumushi Hyakushiki Grillar Grillo to become an insect-like hollow and regain his sight. This makes Suzumushi the zanpakutō with the highest known number of release forms.

He is voiced by Toshiyuki Morikawa in the original Japanese version of the anime. In the English dub, he is voiced by David Rasner until episode 278 then Brian Palermo in later episodes.

==== Shūhei Hisagi ====
Shūhei Hisagi (檜佐木 修兵, Hisagi Shūhei) is the co-lieutenant of Squad Nine, a position he shares with Mashiro, under Captain Kensei. Previously, he was the sole lieutenant when Tōsen was captain. Hisagi also serves as the editor-in-chief of the Seireitei Bulletin, which Squad Nine is responsible for publishing.

As a child he is saved by Kensei, who was captain at the time. In later years, Hisagi has a "69" tattoo on the left side of his face that matches the one on Kensei's stomach. There may also be a connection between his zanpakutō and Kensei's, as they both use kaze (wind). During his time as an instructor at the Soul Reaper academy, Hisagi's class is attacked by a Hollow and he receives a distinctive scar across his face while fighting it. He is an extremely mature and calm individual, which allowed him to get along well with his captain, Tōsen whom he admired a great deal. After Tōsen's defection, Hisagi assumes his duties as an acting replacement. Though he swore to help Komamura "open the eyes" of his former captain, in the end Hisagi is forced to attack Tōsen to keep him from killing Komamura. Kubo has stated in interviews that he was most surprised by Hisagi's rising popularity among fans, which began long before his backstory and personality were really explored, an abnormality among Bleach characters. Hisagi becomes the lead protagonist of the light novel side story Can't Fear Your Own World, which takes place after the Wandenreich's defeat. In it, he learns more of the truth behind Tōsen's betrayal and about the antagonist Tsunayashiro.

Hisagi's zanpakutō is Kazeshini (風死; literally "Death Wind"). When released with the command "reap" (刈れ, kare), it takes the form of two kusarigama-like weapons, with twin blades that curve in opposite directions, connected by a long chain. Hisagi is able to use them as long-distance, retractable projectiles or for a fan-blade attack, but his lingering fears about death and his powers ultimately limit his ability to access its true form. With Kensei's help and encouragement, Hisagi acquires his bankai, Fushi no Kōjyō (風死絞縄; Undying Hangman's Noose), which he eventually uses during his fight with Tsunayashiro in the light novel. His bankai is an orb of black chains that wrap around the necks of both himself and his opponent, like a noose, and continuously drain and heal their spiritual energy and wounds in tandem, preventing them from killing each other. The ability appears to be infinite as Hisagi can survive the complete destruction of his heart and Saketsu, the source of his Shinigami powers.

He is voiced by Katsuyuki Konishi in the original Japanese version of the anime and by Yū Kobayashi as a child and Steve Staley in the English dub.

=== Squad Ten ===
==== Isshin Kurosaki ====
Prior to taking his wife's surname, Ichigo's father Isshin Shiba (志波一心, Shiba Isshin) was originally captain of Squad Ten two decades ago. It is unknown what his relationships are with other members of the Shiba Clan, most notably Kaien Shiba, who bears a strong resemblance to Ichigo. Most of his actions as a Soul Reaper remain unknown, except for the events at Naruki City, where he met the Quincy Masaki Kurosaki while fighting Aizen's hollow White. Masaki is bitten by White and undergoes Hollowification, but Isshin renounces his Soul Reaper powers and links his soul to hers, effectively halting the process and saving her life. He remains with her in the World of the Living as Isshin Kurosaki (黒崎 一心, Kurosaki Isshin) and opens a medical clinic. After losing Masaki to the elusive Hollow Grand Fisher, Isshin eventually regains his Soul Reaper powers, but conceals this knowledge from his family. He kills the Arrancar that Grand Fisher becomes, all the while regretting that he did not have his powers to save Masaki. Isshin later reveals himself as a Soul Reaper to Ichigo while aiding him in his fight with Aizen, appearing just as Aizen is about to reveal his son's lineage as the offspring of a Soul Reaper and a Quincy. Seventeen months later, after Ichigo regains his Soul Reaper powers and the Wandenreich complete their first invasion of the Soul Society, Isshin appears to Ichigo in his Soul Reaper attire and explains Ichigo's past to him.

Having unbelievable spiritual pressure, despite being knocked by Ichigo at times, Isshin is tremendously powerful. His zanpakutō is called Engetsu (剡月; Scathing Moon). The release command is "Burn" (燃えろ, moero), whereupon the blade becomes wreathed in a flame emanating from the sword's tassels. Spitting blood onto the blade creates a huge wave of fire. His bankai is yet to be seen, though Aizen states that it puts a considerable strain on Isshin's body, rendering it uncontrollable if he is heavily injured.

Isshin is voiced by Toshiyuki Morikawa in the original Japanese version of the anime and Patrick Seitz in the English dub.

==== Tōshirō Hitsugaya ====
Tōshirō Hitsugaya is the current captain of Squad Ten and the series' breakout character. His zanpakuto is Hyōrinmaru (氷輪丸; lit. "Ice Ring"), which manifests an ice dragon when summoned and creates ice from moisture in the air. His bankai is Daiguren Hyōrinmaru (大紅蓮氷輪丸; lit. "Great Crimson Ice Ring", idiosyncratically Great Crimson Moon). When using it, wings sprout from Hitsugaya's back, a protective sheath appears on his right arm, and three large, four-petaled time meter flowers appear in the air behind him, (Note: The complete breakdown of all three flowers is initially believed to be a countdown to the reversion of his bankai to its shikai form. However, it is revealed much later on in the series that the countdown is in fact to Daiguren Hyōrinmaru's complete form.) all also made of ice. During this form he is able to perform more powerful ice-based moves.

Hitsugaya's character is inspired by the vice-commander of the Shinsengumi, Hijikata Toshizo. Hijikata was known as the "demonic vice commander", which accounts for Hitsugaya's stern demeanour. He was also known for his problems with women, which is reflected in Hitsugaya's problems with his lieutenant, Matsumoto.

==== Rangiku Matsumoto ====
Rangiku Matsumoto (松本 乱菊, Matsumoto Rangiku) is the lieutenant of Squad Ten. She often uses her beauty and largest bust to avoid work and go shopping or drinking with her fellow lieutenants, but is very serious and thoughtful as a lieutenant when offering advice. She is skilled enough to overwhelm other strong lieutenants, and can hold her own against arrancars. The light novels reveal that Matsumoto possesses a fragment of the Soul King's scattered essence within her, which results in a near death experience when Aizen extracts a portion of her soul for his schemes. This spurs Gin's agenda to avenge her; the two are long-time childhood friends. By the time Matsumoto learns of his true reasons for betraying the Soul Society, she has already mourned him as Nanao notes.

Years ago, when Hitsugaya resided in Rukongai, Matsumoto persuaded him to join the Gotei Thirteen in order to gain control over his spiritual pressure. The two have grown close ever since. Although Hitsugaya always bickers about her drinking habit and laziness, Matsumoto has an unwavering loyalty and devotion to her captain and frequently tries to get him to lighten up, despite his serious attitude. Before Hitsugaya, Matsumoto also had a close relationship with her former captain, Isshin Shiba, who was just as lazy as herself. She often foisted her responsibilities onto him and he would retaliate in kind.

Her zanpakutō is Haineko (灰猫; literally "Ash cat"). Its guard is in the shape of a cat's head. When released with the command "Purrl" (唸れ, Unare), the blade dissolves into mist. In combat, Matsumoto can control the movement of the mist and cut anything it lands on by moving the hilt. The mist is also solid enough to be used as a shield to block enemy attacks. Due to her laziness, she has difficulty achieving bankai. Kubo has identified Matsumoto as one of his two favorite female characters in the series, citing that he "has a lot of fun drawing her and creating stories with her."

She is voiced by Kaya Matsutani in the original Japanese version of the anime and Megan Hollingshead in the English dub.

=== Squad Eleven ===
Founded by its original leader Retsu Unohana, Squad Eleven is a direct-combat division that promotes sword-only combat, making them the most specialized squad among the Gotei Thirteen as they forgo other Soul Reaper practices. The squad members' shared ideal is that fighting is what makes life worth living and they prefer death in battle. Each captain of Squad Eleven takes on the title "Kenpachi". Its current leader, Zaraki, is the eleventh Kenpachi.

==== Kenpachi Kiganjō ====
Kenpachi Kiganjō (鬼厳城 剣八, Kiganjō Kenpachi) was the captain of Squad Eleven immediately preceding Kenpachi Zaraki, primarily known as the tenth Kenpachi. Before he became captain, his name was Gosuke Kiganjō (鬼厳城 五助, Kiganjō Gosuke). He appeared in the Turn Back the Pendulum gaiden, set 100 years before the main story. Kiganjō was bloodthirsty like all other captains of the squad, but also extremely lazy as he often failed to attend the captains' meetings, as stated by Captain Hirako. He eventually relinquishes his position, along with his life, during Zaraki's captaincy test, which required him to fight and kill Kiganjō while witnessed by 200 members of the squad.

==== Kenpachi Zaraki ====
Kenpachi Zaraki (更木剣八, Zaraki Kenpachi), is an ex-enemy and bloodthirsty rival of Ichigo and the current captain of Squad Eleven. Though self-centered and violent, his actions as captain tend to be for the best. His relationship with his subordinates and others, however, is always portrayed comically. This comical shift is primarily centered around his appearances in the Bleach anime and omake stories, with the exception of the occasional diatribe between himself and his lieutenant, Yachiru. He is depicted as having a very poor sense of direction and is often shown in omake stories asking Yachiru for help, who then points him in a random direction even though she herself has a terrible sense of direction.

Zaraki's character is inspired by Shinpachi Nagakura, the captain of the second squad of the Shinsengumi. Shinpachi was a proud and arrogant fighter, due to his being the only swordsman born into a samurai-origin family, accounting for Zaraki's superciliousness and reliance on his natural power only.

He is voiced by Fumihiko Tachiki in the original Japanese version of the anime. In the English dub, he is voiced by David Lodge until episode 243, and by Patrick Seitz afterward.

==== Yachiru Kusajishi ====
Yachiru Kusajishi (草鹿 やちる, Kusajishi Yachiru) is the lieutenant of Squad Eleven, most recognizable by her mid-length, bright pink hair. Childlike in most aspects, she is small, cute, cheerful, and carefree most of the time. Zaraki finds her as an infant in the 79th District of Rukongai's North Alley, "Kusajishi", the second-most violent area of Rukongai compared to the 80th District "Zaraki". Despite being drenched in blood and having just killed a large group of men, she is not frightened of him and touches his blood-soaked zanpakutō unfazed. Zaraki names her "Yachiru", in memory of the only person he has ever admired, Captain Unohana. Since then, Yachiru spends much of her time clinging to his back for transport. Like Zaraki, she has no sense of direction, even though he relies on her to find his way; when he asks her for directions, her usual response is to point in a random direction. Yachiru resents being criticized in any way and will often attack the perpetrator in comical fashion. Further reflecting her childlike nature, Yachiru likes giving people nicknames; for example, she calls her captain "Ken-chan" ("Kenny" in the English version) and Byakuya "Bya-kun". Various Bleach omakes show that Yachiru has an absolute love for candy, which is often exploited by other characters to bribe her into leaving them alone. Despite her childlike appearance, Yachiru is quite strong, capable of lifting Zaraki and leaping between buildings while carrying him. She is also very fast for her size. She can emit a large volume of spiritual energy when angry, which takes the form of a large, pink, angry cat face. She also has a very high spiritual pressure.

Yachiru's zanpakutō is named Sanpo Kenjū (三步剣獣, "Three-Step Sword Beasts"). In its sealed state Sanpo Kenjū takes the form of a wakizashi with a pink hilt which she drags around on a string. Two wheels attached to the bottom of the sheath for her by Ikkaku facilitate this. According to Yachiru, the ability of her zanpakutō creates two invisible copycats which respectively attack right before and right after Yachiru's own attacks, effectively causing her attacks to hit three times and making them more difficult to dodge. Whenever Yachiru wants to, she can make the copycats (whom she refers to as "kids") visible to others, revealing their monstrous and intimidating appearance.

It is later revealed that Yachiru is actually a manifestation of Nozarashi, Zaraki's zanpakutō. During the battle against the Wandenreich, Yachiru tells him to release her true power, after which she vanishes to form his bankai state. Her position as lieutenant is then filled by Ikkaku.

She is voiced by Hisayo Mochizuki in the original Japanese version of the anime and Dina Sherman in the English dub.

==== Ikkaku Madarame ====
Ikkaku Madarame (斑目 一角, Madarame Ikkaku) is the Third Seat Officer, and later lieutenant of Squad Eleven. (Note: Ikkaku becomes lieutenant ten years after the Wandenreich invasion.) A bald-headed, battle-loving man, he fought and was defeated by Zaraki sometime in the past, but was strong enough to survive the battle. When Zaraki becomes captain, Ikkaku and his friend Yumichika Ayasegawa join the Soul Reapers so that they can fight and die under his command. Ikkaku shares a number of similarities with his captain such as seeking enjoyment in battles by risking his life, and is reportedly the second strongest man in the squad, strong enough to take a position as a captain should he so choose. Ikkaku, however, maintains that his one mission in life is to die under Zaraki's command.

Ikkaku's zanpakutō is Hōzukimaru (鬼灯丸; referring to the Japanese name for the winter cherry, meaning "Demon light"). Though ordinary in appearance, he stores a blood-clotting styptic ointment in its hilt. When released by the command "extend" (延びろ, nobiro), it transforms into a yari with a wax wood shaft. While he usually treats it as such, he can also turn its shaft into a three-section staff to surprise an opponent by using the command "split" (裂けろ, sakero). Ikkaku has achieved bankai, but keeps this a secret from most characters to avoid being pressured to become a captain. Hōzukimaru's bankai, named Ryūmon Hōzukimaru (龍紋鬼灯丸; literally "Dragon-crest Demon light"), takes the form of three oversized weapons connected by a thick chain: two blades in each of his hands and a fan-shaped blade, adorned with a carving of a Chinese dragon, which floats behind him. Aside from the increase in power, his bankai offers no special abilities and is noted to be unusual in this regard. Additionally, its blades appear to have a generally weak integrity for a bankai, as shown when Ikkaku combats the Thirteenth Arrancar, Edorad Leones, and later the physical released form of his zanpakutō (in its bankai state), using nothing but his own katana and spiritual pressure to shatter them. As a fight progresses, the dragon crest will slowly begin to glow crimson, greatly increasing its power as it does so. Ikkaku claims that it is lazy and only fully awakens when the dragon crest is fully crimson.

He is voiced by Nobuyuki Hiyama in the original Japanese version of the anime. In the English dub, he is voiced by Vic Mignogna in the original English dub (except in episodes 104 and 105 where he is voiced by Michael Sinterniklaas), and Todd Haberkorn in Bleach: Thousand-Year Blood War.

==== Yumichika Ayasegawa ====
Yumichika Ayasegawa (綾瀬川 弓親, Ayasegawa Yumichika) is the Fifth Seat Officer of Squad Eleven and Ikkaku's lifelong friend. He values Ikkaku's opinion very highly and tends to follow him everywhere. The two joined the Soul Reapers to serve under Zaraki. Yumichika's position in the squad does not reflect his actual strength as he chose the fifth seat only because third was already taken by Ikkaku, and he believes five is a more beautiful number than four. Yumichika sports colorful feathers on his eyelashes and eyebrow and has shiny skin and hair, giving him a womanly appearance. Narcissistic and vain, he judges everyone and everything by beauty, going so far as trying to forget about things he deems "ugly" after seeing them, even attempting to fight an ugly opponent with his eyes closed.

Yumichika's zanpakutō is Ruri'iro Kujaku (瑠璃色孔雀; literally "azure peacock", translated in the anime as Sapphire), a kidō-type zanpakutō. He keeps its true power secret, since Squad Eleven has an unspoken rule that only zanpakutō are to be used for direct attacks, and he would rather risk dying to conceal it. Accordingly, Yumichika releases it under the name Fuji Kujaku (藤孔雀; literally "rattan peacock" translated in the anime as Violet) with the command "bloom" (咲け, sake), causing the vexed weapon to assume a form consisting of a sickle-shaped blade which can split into four identical blades. During his fight with the arrancar Charlotte Cuhlhourne, Yumichika states that his zanpakutō has a favorite and least favorite color, which is why he releases it as Fuji Kujaku (wisteria is its least favorite color). When confident he will be able to keep it a secret, Yumichika uses his zanpakutō's real name and command "tear in frenzy" (裂き狂え, sakikurue) to assume its true released form, with the blades splitting into vines which then bind his opponent and siphon their spiritual energy into flowers which can restore his health upon his eating their petals. Yumichika claims that a full drain from his zanpakuto can kill an opponent, which is proved when he kills an arrancar.

He is voiced by Jun Fukuyama in the original Japanese version of the anime and Brian Beacock in the English dub.

==== Makizō Aramaki ====
Makizō Aramaki (荒巻 真木造, Aramaki Makizō) is the Tenth Seat Officer of Squad Eleven. Nicknamed Maki-Maki by Yachiru, he is often very timid and cowardly, in contrast to other members of the squad. Aramaki makes his first appearance when he, by chance, encounters Orihime and Uryū as they travel across Seireitei disguised as Soul Reapers. Despite being drunk, he sees through their claiming to be part of the squad. However, during an attack by Squad Twelve's Captain Kurotsuchi, Orihime protects Aramaki alongside herself and Uryū with her Shun Shun Rikka abilities. Aramaki becomes confused by Orihime's apparent distress over with the deaths of the attacking Soul Reapers and her saving him.

As Uryū begins fighting Kurotsuchi, he orders Aramaki to take Orihime to safety, threatening to shoot him if he does not comply. As Aramaki retreats with Orihime, she demands that he let her go in order to assist Uryū, but he refuses. When Orihime bites him, he knocks her unconscious, and shortly thereafter, encounters Yachiru. Yachiru has him take Orihime back to Squad Eleven's barracks so that she can lead Zaraki to Ichigo. Aramaki accompanies them as they look for Ichigo, questioning why they would go so far for a friend. The group eventually catch up to Ichigo after his victory over Byakuya. When Ichigo asks who he is, Aramaki responds that he is no one important and that Ichigo should just pretend that he is not there.

Aramaki later appears in the Bount arc. His nickname ("Maki-Maki") is confused with that of Maki Ichinose's ("Maki-chan").

He is voiced by Yūichi Nagashima in the original Japanese version of the anime and JB Blanc in the English dub.

==== Maki Ichinose ====
Maki Ichinose (一之瀬 真樹, Ichinose Maki), introduced during the anime's Bount arc, was a member of Squad Eleven under its former captain, Kiganjō. He leaves after Kiganjō is killed by Zaraki, during the latter's captaincy proficiency test, and travels the human world. One day, while in a weakened state in a desert, he comes across a hollow that almost kills him; it is subdued by Jin Kariya, who allows Ichinose to kill it. Ichinose swears loyalty to Jin after that, only breaking his vow once to fight Zaraki. He helps the Bounts infiltrate the Soul Society and gets to fight Zaraki, but is eventually killed by Kariya once his purpose is fulfilled.

Maki's zanpakutō is called Nijigasumi (虹霞; literally "rainbow mist"). Its shikai form is activated by the command "shine brightly" (光華閃け, kōka hirameke) or "flash and burst" in the English Dub. When released, Nijigasumi glows with rainbow colors and has the ability to control light for various purposes. It can make Ichinose turn invisible or flood the surrounding area with light, playing havoc with opponents' counterattacks. It can also use light offensively, creating blades of light to cut or crush opponents. His zanpakutō later helps in Kariya's defeat, acting as a lightning rod for Kariya's attacks.

He is voiced by Susumu Chiba in the original Japanese version of the anime and Sam Riegel in the English dub.

==== Ashido Kano ====
Ashido Kano (狩能 雅忘人, Kanō Ashido) is an anime-exclusive Soul Reaper, that Kubo intended to include in the manga, but could not due to time contraints, according to the extras from Volume 29, page 196. He is a Soul Reaper whose unit got stranded hundres of years prior to the main story in Hueco Mundo, with him remaining the sole survivor by the time he encounters Rukia. He is exceptionally skilled with using Kido spells. In Ryōgo Narita's light novel Bleach: Spirits Are Forever With You, he is specified as a former lieutenant of Squad Eleven under the 7th Kenpachi, Kenpachi Kuruyashiki.

He is voiced by Yasuyuki Kase^{Ep. 147 credits} in the original Japanese version of the anime and Travis Willingham in the English dub.

=== Squad Twelve ===
Originally led by Kirio Hikifune, Squad Twelve is associated with scientific research. Kirio's successor, Kisuke Urahara, established the Soul Reaper Research and Development Institute (SRDI) during his tenure. After Urahara and his lieutenant Hiyori Sarugaki are forced to leave their posts as the former is accused of the Hollowification of the latter and the other Vizards, Mayuri Kurotsuchi becomes captain. Third Seat Officer Akon becomes the squad's new lieutenant following Nemu's death.

==== Mayuri Kurotsuchi ====
Mayuri Kurotsuchi is the current captain of Squad Twelve and second President of the SRDI. Originally kept chained in solitary confinement in an underground prison on the grounds of Squad Two's barracks called the Nest of Maggots, Urahara releases Mayuri and brings him to Squad Twelve to assist with setting up the SRDI. He appoints him Third Seat Officer and Vice-president of the new department. When Urahara is forced to forfeit his positions after being framed by Aizen for the Hollowification of his lieutenant and other officers, Mayuri becomes the new squad captain as well as President of the SRDI.

A scientist and researcher with an extremely high scientific intellect, Mayuri views all things as research objects and potential experiments, even experimenting on and modifying his own body. He has little regard for life, but is obsessed with creating it, specifically creating a soul from nothing, something he is eventually able to do when he successfully brings Nemu into being. Mayuri has created numerous inventions to aid him in battle, is a master of kidō, and has a very high level of spiritual energy.

His zanpakutō is Ashisogi Jizō (疋殺地蔵; "Animal killing Ksitigarbha") and his bankai is Konjiki Ashisogi Jizō (金色疋殺地蔵; "Gold Animal killing Ksitigarbha", translated in the English manga as "divine leg-cutting Buddha"). Mayuri's bankai is physically modified to self-destruct and return to its sealed state should it attack him. He has an alternative bankai called Konjiki Ashisogi Jizō: Makai Fukuin Shōtai. Additionally, he can reduce his body to liquid form for three days by stabbing himself with his zanpakutō, leaving him unable to attack or be attacked, but able to effectively escape any situation.

He is voiced by Ryūsei Nakao in the original Japanese versiom of the anime and by Terrence Stone in the English dub.

==== Nemu Kurotsuchi ====
Nemu Kurotsuchi (涅 ネム, Kurotsuchi Nemu) is the lieutenant of Squad Twelve for most of the series. Also known as Nemuri VII (Nemuri Nanagō), she was created by Mayuri as part of the Nemuri Project, to create new life through use of Gigai (義骸; artificial bodies) and Mod Souls (義魂, gikon). She outlives her "older sisters", Mayuri's previous failed attempts.

Nemu is an introverted, passive woman and prefers to stay silent in her captain's presence. When she does speak, it is in a subdued monotone, and in at least one comical instance she mixes up the colloquial usage of the word "cheese" when taking a picture with the word "butter." Though Mayuri refers to Nemu as his "daughter", he pretends to be uncaring towards her to hide his joy over creating a fully stable artificial life form and acts as though she is nothing more than a tool to be used. Nemu learns the truth from Akon and keeps it to herself. She has compassion for others, as seen when she saves Uryū's life out of gratitude to him for sparing her captain's life. During Mayuri's fight with the Quincy Pernida Parnkgjas, Nemu acts against his orders to save him, revealing that she has modified her body strength and increased her decomposition rate. Despite Mayuri's chastising, Nemu throws him a safe distance away then proceeds to fight Pernida on her own, ultimately sacrificing herself so that Pernida suffers an agonizing death from consuming her cellular makeup. Mayuri saves Nemu's brain from being eaten. Nemu's lieutenant position is taken over by Akon, who formerly filled the Third Seat position, and Mayuri creates the younger Nemuri VIII (眠八號, Nemuri Hachigō) as his new assistant.

Her body is a Gigai designed to withstand fatal wounds and is immune to various poisons. It contains several toxins and serums that Mayuri stored within it, making Nemu highly dangerous to anyone who consumes her or attacks her internally. While her Gigai is composed of highly regenerative cells regulated by her brain, Nemu can still experience pain and carries a variety of antidotes to use as she sees fit. In addition to possessing superhuman strength, she can bore through obstacles by rotating either of her arms at high speeds, with her hand functioning as a drill bit while utilizing parts of her soul in her more devastating attacks. Nemu does not typically carry a zanpakutō, but she is depicted with one in an illustration in the All Color but the Black art book; it takes the form of what appears to be a thin katana.

She is voiced by Rie Kugimiya in the original Japanese version of the anime and Megan Hollingshead in the English dub.

==== Akon ====
Akon (阿近) is 3rd Seat of the 12th Division for most of the series, and Vice-President of the Shinigami Research and Development Institute. One-hundred-and-one years ago, a young Akon was incarcerated in the Nest of Maggots along with Mayuri Kurotsuchi, but was eventually released to join the 12th Division as an assistant in the Shinigami Research and Development Institute, quickly rising through the ranks and becoming an aide to Mayuri and his experiments. During the initial Quincy invasion, he is instrumental in the Soul Reapers' communications and investigation efforts, and is the one to let Ichigo in from Hueco Mundo before getting injured by the Sternritter Shaz Domino. Following the destabilization of the Three Worlds by Yhwach, he initiates a plan to allow hollows from Hueco Mundo into Soul Society to restore balance. Ten years after Yhwach's defeat and Nemuri VII's demise at Pernida Parnkgjas' hands, he succeeds her as Squad Twelve lieutenant.

He is voiced by Keijin Okuda^{Ep. 43 credits} and by Kaya Miyake^{Ep. 209 credits} as a child in the original Japanese dub of the anime. In the original English dub of the anime, Travis Willingham voices him, while Karen Strassman voices him as a child, though in the Memories of Nobody movie David Lodge voices him instead, whereas Gavin Harrison voices him in the English dub of the Thousand-Year Blood War arc.

=== Squad Thirteen ===
Squad Thirteen's jurisdiction in the land of the living includes Karakura Town, with one member of the squad usually sent to patrol the area for any Hollow sightings. Notable members include Rukia Kuchiki, who succeeds Jūshirō Ukitake as captain after the Wandenreich invasion.

==== Jūshirō Ukitake ====
Jūshirō Ukitake (浮竹 十四郎, Ukitake Jūshirō) was the Captain of Squad Thirteen and the creator of the Substitute Soul Reaper Badge. As a child, he had an incurable and fatal lung disease that whitened his hair from the age of three. His parents took him to the shrine of an Eastern Rukongai temple dedicated to the hand-like deity Mimihagi (Note: Mimihagi is also the Right Hand of the Soul King. It possesses the powers of Stillness and the Stagnation of Governance.) when doctors were no longer able to treat him. While Mimihagi saved his life by removing his lungs, Jūshirō still experiences the effects of the illness, with his occasional flare ups and coughing up blood inhibiting him throughout the series, especially when he fights for too long or becomes too agitated. Jūshirō has a kind and gentle disposition. Despite being forced to relegate most of his duties as captain to his subordinates, he is respected by many Soul Reapers for his honesty, loyalty, and personal sense of justice. He and his friend Shunsui are two of the oldest and most talented captains in the Gotei Thirteen, both having trained under General Yamamoto one thousand years before the current Bleach storyline. During the series' final arc, when the Soul King is killed, Jūshirō realizes that the only resort left is to relinquish his body and life to Mimihagi, through the Kamikake (神掛; Divine Possession, or "Divine Vow") ritual, (Note: an individual who has previously given part of their body to Mimihagi can sacrifice the rest of their body and their life in exchange for becoming Mimihagi's vessel and assuming the role of the Right Hand of the Soul King.) so that he can take the Soul King's place and save the Soul Society. When Yhwach forcibly consumes Mimihagi, effectively disrupting the ritual, Jūshirō collapses and dies.

Jūshirō's zanpakutō is Sōgyo no Kotowari (双魚の理; literally "law of the twin fish") and it is released by the command "All Waves Rise Now and Become my Shield! Lightning, Strike Now and Become my Blade!" (波悉く我が盾となれ雷悉く我が刃となれ, nami kotogotoku waga tate to nare, ikazuchi kotogotoku waga yaiba to nare). In its shikai state, Sōgyo no Kotowari splits into two thin blades resembling fishing javelins, making it one of only three zanpakutō (Note: along with Shunsui's Katen Kyōkotsu and the new, reforged version of Ichigo's Zangetsu) in the Soul Society to exist as a pair of separate blades. It has the ability to absorb reiatsu-based attacks through its left blade and release them at full force through the right; the tags along the chain connecting the blades allow Jūshirō to increase the speed and power of the reflected attack. Some Bleach video games set prior to the current story arc incorrectly portray it as having the ability to manipulate water and electricity (which is impossible for zanpakutō). His bankai is unknown.

Jūshirō's character is greatly inspired by Captain Okita of the Shinsengumi. Okita was a handsome but unhealthy warrior, even though he was believed to be the strongest samurai in the Shinsengumi. This is why Jūshirō, while always sick, is portrayed as being very popular with female characters in the series. Additionally, because of Okita's child-adoring personality, Jūshirō is shown as a man who loves children and never wants to hurt them.

Jūshirō is voiced by Hideo Ishikawa in the original Japanese version and by Natsumi Fujiwara^{Ep. 395 credits} as a child. In the English dub, he is voiced by Liam O'Brien (except in episode 40 where he is voiced by Kim Strauss) and by Aleks Le in the English dub of the Thousand-Year Blood War arc, while Kate Higgins voices him as a child.

==== Kaien Shiba ====
Kaien Shiba (志波 海燕, Shiba Kaien) was a former lieutenant of Squad Thirteen, which his wife Miyako Shiba also belonged to. He is the brother of Ganju and Kūkaku Shiba. Kaien's physical appearance closely resembles that of Ichigo, a fact noted by Byakuya early on in the series, except Kaien had black hair. During Rukia's entrance as a new member of the squad, Kaien and Miyako are the only ones to treat her as a normal Soul Reaper and thus their equal, rather than as a noble of the Kuchiki family. Kaien becomes Rukia's mentor and helps her achieve her shikai, teaching her many things that would help her later on in life. After Miyako is possessed and murdered by the hollow Metastacia, Kaien is also possessed by Metastacia while on a mission to slay it, and Rukia is eventually forced to kill him. After Metastacia returns to Hueco Mundo, it is consumed by Espada Aaroniero Arruruerie, who also absorbs Kaien's soul and becomes able to assume his form and use his abilities.

The name of Kaien's zanpakutō is Nejibana (捩花, literally "Spiranthes", "Twisted Flower" in the English dub). The shikai command is "Surge, Water and Heaven" (水天逆巻け, suiten sakamake), translated as "Rage through the Seas and Heavens" in the English dub, or "Rankle the Seas and Heavens" in some translations. His shikai takes the form of a trident and has the ability to create and control water.

Toshihiko Seki voices Kaien's character in the original Japanese version of the anime. In the English dub, he is voiced by Kim Strauss (in his first appearance in a flashback scene in episode 49) and Dave Mallow (in later flashbacks).

==== Miyako Shiba ====
Miyako Shiba (志波 都, Shiba Miyako) was the former Third Seat Officer of Squad Thirteen and lieutenant to her husband Kaien. Like her husband, Miyako treated Rukia as a normal Soul Reaper during her entrance, rather than a noble, and quickly became Rukia's personal idol. Miyako was assigned to a mission that eventually led to her death by the hollow Metastacia, who had infected her body and caused her to kill all members of her squad while under its control.

She is voiced by Sumi Shimamoto in the original Japanese version of the anime and Cindy Robinson in the English dub.

==== Kiyone Kotetsu ====
Kiyone Kotetsu (虎徹 清音, Kotetsu Kiyone) is the co-Third Seat Officer of Squad Thirteen, a position she shares with Sentarō Kotsubaki, whom she often competes with in order to impress her captain. She is the younger sister of Isane, the Vice-Captain of Squad Four. Because of her short hair and youthful appearance, Kiyone can easily be mistaken for a boy.

She is voiced by Chinami Nishimura in the origina; Japanese version of the anime and Cindy Robinson in the English dub.

==== Sentarō Kotsubaki ====
Sentarō Kotsubaki (小椿 仙太郎, Kotsubaki Sentarō) is the co-Third Seat Officer of Squad Thirteen, a position he shares with Kiyone, whom he often competes with in order to impress his captain. He later becomes Lieutenant when Rukia becomes Captain.

He is voiced by Kōichi Tōchika in the original Japanese version of the anime and Patrick Seitz in the English dub (except in episode 41 where he was voiced by Michael Lindsay).

==== Zennosuke Kurumadani ====
Zennosuke Kurumadani (車谷 善之介, Kurumadani Zennosuke), sometimes referred to as either "Fro-Man" (アフロさん, Afurosan) or "Af-san" (アフさん, Afusan) due to his comically large Afro, is the egocentric Soul Reaper who replaces Rukia Kuchiki as the guardian of the areas around Karakura Town. By the return of the Wandenreich, he is replaced by Ryūnosuke Yuki and Shino Madarame as guardians of Karakura Town. After the distortions of the Three Worlds grow exponentially, Akon dispatches him to eliminate Hollows in the Human World. He is the 10th Seat officer of the Thirteenth Division. His zanpakutō is called Tsuchinamazu.

He is voiced by Masashi Yabe^{Ep. 54 credits} in the original Japanese version of the anime and by Kirk Thornton in the English dub (except in episode 80 where he is voiced by Terrence Stone).

==== Ryūnosuke Yuki ====
Ryūnosuke Yuki (行木 竜ノ介, Yuki Ryūnosuke) is a member of Squad Thirteen, replacing Zennosuke Kurumadani in overseeing Karakura Town during the Wandenreich arc. Ryūnosuke is an easily frightened, timid figure who lacks confidence in his abilities, but often overcomes his fear during critical situations. Ichigo's group saves Ryūnosuke from Hollows. During the war of the Soul Society, Ryūnosuke learns about the conflict between Soul Reapers and Quincies. After the distortions of the Three Worlds grow exponentially, Akon dispatches him to eliminate Hollows in the Human World. In the final battle against Yhwach, Shunsui hides him in his Kageoni to land a surprise attack on Yhwach.

He is voiced by Daiki Yamashita in the original Japanese version of the anime and Aleks Le in the English dub.

==== Shino Madarame ====
Shino Madarame (斑目 志乃, Madarame Shino) is a member of Squad Thirteen, replacing Zennosuke Kurumadani in overseeing Karakura Town during the Wandenreich arc. She is a tomboyish, loud and rude young Soul Reaper and Ikkaku's little sister. Ichigo's group saves Shino from Hollows. During the war of the Soul Society, Shino learns about the conflict between Soul Reapers and Quincies. After the distortions of the Three Worlds grow exponentially, Akon dispatches him to eliminate Hollows in the Human World.

She is voiced by Asami Seto^{Ep. 367 credits} in the original Japanese version of the anime and Amber Lee Connors in the English dub.

=== Squad Zero ===
Squad Zero (零番隊, Reibantai; Zero Division in manga), also known as the Royal Guard (王属特務, Ōzokutokumu), is an elite squad of former captains who are charged with protecting the Soul King (霊王, Reiō), his family, and his residence, the Soul King Palace (霊王宮, Reiōkyū). Each member of this squad has made significant contributions to the history of the Soul Society and was promoted to Squad Zero for their respective achievements. Although it is commonly believed that their objective is serve and protect the Soul King, the light novels later reveal that the Royal Guard's true loyalties are actually to the Soul Society's four great noble houses and that their real purpose is to contain the Soul King and maintain the status quo by any means necessary. The division's flower is the Daphne odora, meaning "glory".

==== Ichibe'e Hyōsube ====
Ichibe'e Hyōsube (兵主部 一兵衛, Hyōsube Ichibe'e) is the commander of the Royal Guard, holding the title "Monk Who Calls the Real Name" (真名呼和尚, Manako Oshō). Ichibe'e is credited with having named everything in the Soul Society. Since he coined the term in the first place, he knows the name of every zanpakutō wielded by every Soul Reaper ever, as well as their true names that even their wielders may not yet have learned themselves. Although Ichibe'e typically presents himself as a loud, friendly, and upbeat man with a strong sense of duty, this is actually just a facade to hide the fact that he is utterly obsessed with maintaining the balance between the three worlds and has no respect for anyone who desires to destroy that balance for any reason. He also comes off as mysterious and secretive to his subordinates, with several captains having questioned his true motives on occasion.

Ichibe'e's zanpakutō is Ichimonji (一文字; literally "Straight Line") and takes the form of a large calligraphy brush. It is released by the command "Blacken" (黒めよ, Kuromeyo). In Ichimonji's shikai state, the brush takes the form of a curved blade, while the handle remains the same. Ichimonji has the ability to release ink with every swing it takes. Anything that its ink covers loses its name and powers. It also wields control over the abstract concept of "blackness". Ichimonji's bankai is Shirafude Ichimonji (しら筆 一文字; literally "White Brush Straight Line"). It is uniquely activated by calling out "Shinuchi" (真打, Headliner) instead of "bankai", as Ichimonji was the first zanpakutō to acquire an evolved form long before the term bankai existed. Upon activation, Ichimonji becomes a long, thick thread that coils in the air around Ichibe'e. With Shirafude Ichimonji, Ichibe'e can give and change the name of those who have been struck by the ink of Ichimonji by writing kanji on their body; doing so gives his target the properties and abilities of the name granted. Ichibe'e's zanpakuto is inspired by a katana called "Kiku-ichimonji", believed to have belonged to Captain Okita of the Shinsengumi.

He is voiced by Naomi Kusumi in the original Japanese version of the anime and Aaron LaPlante in the English dub.

==== Tenjirō Kirinji ====
Tenjirō Kirinji (麒麟寺 天示郎, Kirinji Tenjirō) is the First Officer of the Royal Guard and the Divine General of the East (東方神将, Tōhō Shinshō). He is credited with inventing kaidō (回道; lit. "Turn Way"), a healing form of kidō, and holds the title "Hot Spring Demon" (泉湯鬼, Sentōki) for creating hot springs that purge and replace impure blood and reiatsu within an injured individual. These hot springs serve as the basis for the ones Urahara has in his personal training field, which are capable of replenishing reiatsu.

Tenjirō stands out from the rest of the Royal Guard for his ridiculously large pompadour and his rowdy attitude, which usually earns him a blow to the head from his colleagues to keep him under control. Before joining Squad Zero, he was an associate of Unohana and taught her his healing techniques so that she could use them to prolong her fights. Tenjirō's zanpakutō, Kinpika (金毘迦; literally "Gilded Splendor"), is released by the command "Flash from Illuminating Heavens" (天照一閃, Tenshō Issen) and takes the form of a small blade with a curved tip, attached to a long wooden pole. Upon being released, Kinpika glows brightly. However, its true abilities are currently unknown.

He is voiced by Tomoyuki Shimura in the original Japanese version of the anime and Mick Lauer in the English dub.

==== Kirio Hikifune ====
Kirio Hikifune (曳舟 桐生, Hikifune Kirio) is the Second Officer of the Royal Guard and the Divine General of the South (南方神将, Nanpō Shinshō). She is credited with inventing gikon (義魂; lit. "Artificial Souls"), artificial souls that can be inserted into another body and are primarily used by Soul Reapers to eject themselves from their Gigais; these souls would later serve as the basis for the creation of advanced Mod Souls such as Kon. Kirio also holds the title "Ruler of Grain" (穀王, Kokuō) from her ability to infuse her food with her reiatsu, which in turn amplifies the spirit energy of those who consume it. Her unique method of cooking depletes most of her own reiatsu and requires her to bulk up a substantial amount of fat beforehand to compensate, making her very plump in appearance and almost unrecognizable to others. After she finishes cooking, she loses all of the aforementioned weight and reverts to her naturally slender and well-endowed physique.

In combat situations, Kirio can infuse her own reiatsu into tree-like formations called the "Cage of Life". The branches of this structure are capable of absorbing the spirit energy of anything they come into contact with, making them almost indestructible. Her zanpakutō takes the form of a large gray spatula and its true abilities are currently unknown.

Kirio is a cheery and caring woman who has strong maternal tendencies and takes great pride and passion in preparing her reiatsu-enhancing food. Before joining Squad Zero, she was the captain of Squad Twelve and acted as a motherly figure to her lieutenant, Hiyori. Her promotion was so secretive that only her fellow captains and those acquainted with her knew the real reason why she left. Kirio was succeeded by Urahara of Squad Two, but failed to attend his inauguration ceremony.

She is voiced by Ayumi Tsunematsu in the original Japanese version of the anime and Tara Sands in the English dub.

==== Ōetsu Nimaiya ====
Ōetsu Nimaiya (二枚屋 王悦, Nimaiya Ōetsu) is the Third Officer of the Royal Guard and the Divine General of the West (西方神将, Seihō Shinshō), holding the title "God of the Sword" (刀神, Tōshin). He is credited with inventing the zanpakutō, whose basic form, the Asauchi (浅打; lit. "Shadow Hit"), he personally creates for every Soul Reaper. According to Ōetsu himself, the Asauchi, which are wielded by inexperienced Soul Reapers who have yet to communicate with their zanpakutō, are actually the most powerful of their kind, since they have the potential to become anything. He is also the only person in the Soul Society who can truly repair a broken bankai, which he does by completely re-forging the zanpakutō altogether.

Ōetsu is a very hyperactive and goofy individual with a penchant for overly flashy entrances. His weapon of choice is a zanpakutō called Sayafushi (鞘伏, Stealth Dodger), which is extremely sharp and somewhat unstable due to having not been used for a long period of time. Although it never chips or scratches when used, Ōetsu considers Sayafushi to be a failure, as its sharpness prevents him from being able to build a sheath for it, meaning that it fails to meet the basic definition of a sword.

He is voiced by Yōji Ueda in the original Japanese version of the anime and Catero Colbert in the English dub.

==== Senjumaru Shutara ====
Senjumaru Shutara (修多羅 千手丸, Shutara Senjumaru) is the Fourth Officer of the Royal Guard and the Divine General of the North (北方神将, Hoppō Shinshō), holding the title "Great Weave Guard" (大織守, Ōorigami). She is credited with inventing the shihakushō (死覇装; lit. Garment of Dead Souls"), the black garment worn by all Soul Reapers. Senjumaru has six golden, elongated, puppet-like arms that can be manipulated with great dexterity and speed. These arms are deceptively strong for how thin they are, with each one capable of carrying an entire person with ease. She also presides over a cadre of assassin-like, faceless soldiers (Note: Senjumaru refers to them as "The Blade of the Soul King") that assist her in combat.

Senjumaru is a soft-spoken and coolheaded woman with a dark sense of humor, which she primarily demonstrates in the midst of battle. She also appears to despise the Quincy, as shown when she refers to them as a race "forsaken by the Soul King", and expresses a desire to eradicate them entirely. Before joining Squad Zero, she was the leader of an unofficial inventors group in the Soul Society, with Mayuri serving as one of her subordinates at the time.

Senjumaru's zanpakutō is Shigarami (刺絡; literally "Piercing Entanglement") and takes the form of a large golden sewing needle. In its shikai state, Shigarami can create and manipulate textiles for both offensive and defensive purposes in a matter of seconds, such as immobilizing an opponent by sewing them to the ground, altering the fabric of their outfit with spikes that skewer them from within, forming doppelgangers to take attacks in her stead, or weaving extremely convincing illusions to fool her opponents. Shigarami's bankai is Shatatsu Karagara Shigarami no Tsuji (娑闥迦羅骸刺絡辻; literally "Crossing of Sahā's Gate, Kāla's Corpse and Piercing Entanglements"). Upon activation, it manifests as a massive golden loom that weaves vast quantities of specialized fabric, which Senjumaru manipulates into uniquely patterned tapestries designed to trap and counter her opponent(s) and their strengths. She can then conjure special environments (resembling pocket dimensions) that reflect the new destiny she has weaved—Senjumaru effectively manipulates "the proverbial string of fate" of her opponent(s)—into the fabric for them. Once Senjumaru cuts and releases all of the finished pieces on the loom, her opponents are silently killed and their corpses are sealed within her tapestries.

She is voiced by Rina Satō in the original Japanese version of the anime and Jeannie Tirado in the English dub.

== Reception ==
Several manga, anime, and other entertainment media have commented on the Soul Reapers from the series. Carlo Santos from Anime News Network praised the use of the Soul Reapers and Soul Society, since it "takes the familiar tournament formula to the height of creativity" regarding the fact that "this isn't just training and fighting anymore". Melissa Harper commented that while the name Shinigami is changed to Soul Reaper in the English adaptation, it is an adequate description, and is "therefore a perfectly fine translation." Mania Entertainment commented that Ichigo's becoming a Soul Reaper was "a basic setup for the series itself" and praised how he does not make "awkward moments of handling a sword" making the series less common. Michael Aronson from Mangalife.com noted the Soul Reapers to be initially similar to the Ghostbusters, but praised how they were later developed as the series progressed. IGN has praised the interactions between the characters, pinpointing Suì-Fēng and Yoruichi's relationship as having one of the more interesting histories in the series, but felt more could have been done to flesh out their story.
