= List of Bleach episodes =

Episodes of Japanese anime series

Key visual for the original series

Bleach is a Japanese anime television series based on Tite Kubo's manga Bleach. It was directed by Noriyuki Abe, produced by TV Tokyo, Dentsu and Studio Pierrot, and aired in Japan from October 5, 2004, to March 27, 2012, running for a total of 366 episodes. The series follows the adventures of high school student Ichigo Kurosaki who can see spirits and becomes a Soul Reaper, after assuming the duties of Soul Reaper Rukia Kuchiki.

Viz Media obtained the foreign television, home video and merchandising rights to the Bleach anime from TV Tokyo Corporation and Shueisha on March 15, 2006. Subsequently, Viz Media contracted Studiopolis to create the English adaptation of the anime, and has licensed its individual Bleach merchandising rights to several different companies. The English adaptation of the Bleach anime premiered on Canada's YTV in their Bionix programming block on September 9, 2006. Cartoon Network in the U.S. began airing Bleach the following evening on September 10 as part of Adult Swim.

Forty-five pieces of theme music are used for the episodes: Fifteen opening themes and thirty closing themes. Several CDs that contain the theme music and other tracks have been released by Studio Pierrot.

A follow-up sequel series that adapts the final story arc from the manga, titled Bleach: Thousand-Year Blood War, aired from October 11, 2022, to October 27, 2026. It was directed by Tomohisa Taguchi (Note: Director (監督) for Parts 1–2 and Chief Director (総監督) for Parts 3–4) and Hikaru Murata (Note: Chief Episode Director (チーフ演出) for Parts 1–2 and Director (監督) for Parts 3–4) and produced by the same companies as the original series but with the addition of the manga's publishing company, Shueisha.

== Series overview ==
=== Bleach (2004–2012) ===
Season	Episodes	Originally released	
Season	Episodes	First released	Last released
1	20	October 5, 2004	February 22, 2005
2	21	March 1, 2005	July 19, 2005
3	22	July 26, 2005	January 10, 2006
4	28	January 17, 2006	August 1, 2006
5	18	August 8, 2006	January 4, 2007
6	22	January 10, 2007	June 27, 2007
7	20	July 4, 2007	December 5, 2007
8	16	December 12, 2007	April 16, 2008
9	22	April 23, 2008	October 7, 2008
10	16	October 14, 2008	February 3, 2009
11	7	February 10, 2009	March 24, 2009
12	17	March 31, 2009	July 21, 2009
13	36	July 28, 2009	April 6, 2010
14	51	April 13, 2010	April 5, 2011
15	26	April 12, 2011	October 4, 2011
16	24	October 11, 2011	March 27, 2012

=== Bleach: Thousand-Year Blood War (2022–2026) ===
Part	Episodes	Originally released	
Part	Episodes	First released	Last released
1	13	October 11, 2022	December 27, 2022
2	13	July 8, 2023	September 30, 2023
3	14	October 5, 2024	December 28, 2024
4	10	July 25, 2026	October 27, 2026

== Episodes ==
=== Bleach (2004–2012) ===
==== Season 1: The Substitute Soul Reaper (2004–2005) ====
No. overall	No. in season	Title	Directed by (Note: Production staff information is taken from the ending credits of each episode.)	Written by	Storyboarded by	Original release date	English air date
1	1	"The Day I Became a Shinigami"; Transliteration: "Shinigami ni Natchatta Hi" (Japanese: 死神になっちゃった日)	Noriyuki Abe	Masashi Sogo	Noriyuki Abe	October 5, 2004	September 10, 2006
2	2	"A Shinigami's Work"; Transliteration: "Shinigami no Oshigoto" (Japanese: 死神のお仕事)	Jun'ya Koshiba	Natsuko Takahashi	Jun'ya Koshiba	October 12, 2004	September 17, 2006
3	3	"The Older Brother's Wish, the Younger Sister's Wish"; Transliteration: "Ani no Negai, Imōto no Negai" (Japanese: 兄の願い、妹の願い)	Shigeki Hatakeyama	Natsuko Takahashi	Noriyuki Abe	October 19, 2004	September 24, 2006
4	4	"Cursed Parakeet"; Transliteration: "Noroi no Inko" (Japanese: 呪いのインコ)	Takuji Kimura	Genki Yoshimura	Hidehito Ueda	October 26, 2004	October 1, 2006
5	5	"Beat the Invisible Enemy!"; Transliteration: "Mienai Teki o Nagure!" (Japanese: 見えない敵を殴れ！)	Kazunori Mizuno	Genki Yoshimura	Tetsuhito Saitō	November 2, 2004	October 8, 2006
6	6	"Fight to the Death! Ichigo vs. Ichigo"; Transliteration: "Shitō! Ichigo vs. Ichigo" (Japanese: 死闘！一護VSイチゴ)	Jun'ya Koshiba	Michiko Yokote	Motosuke Takahashi	November 9, 2004	October 15, 2006
7	7	"Greetings from a Stuffed Lion"; Transliteration: "Nuigurumi kara Konnichiwa" (Japanese: ぬいぐるみからコンにちは)	Akira Shimizu	Michiko Yokote & Masashi Sogo	Motosuke Takahashi & Shigeki Hatakeyama	November 16, 2004	October 22, 2006
8	8	"June 17, Memories in the Rain"; Transliteration: "Roku-gatsu Jūshichi-nichi, Ame no Kioku" (Japanese: 6月17日、雨の記憶)	Shigeki Hatakeyama	Masashi Sogo	Noriyuki Abe	November 23, 2004	October 29, 2006
9	9	"Unbeatable Enemy"; Transliteration: "Taosenai Teki" (Japanese: 倒せない敵)	Takuji Kimura	Masashi Sogo	Sanzō Tsunoda	November 30, 2004	November 5, 2006
10	10	"Assault on Trip at Sacred Ground!"; Transliteration: "Burari Reijō Totsugeki no Tabi!" (Japanese: ぶらり霊場突撃の旅！)	Kazunori Mizuno	Masahiro Ōkubo	Kazunori Mizuno	December 7, 2004	November 12, 2006
11	11	"The Legendary Quincy"; Transliteration: "Densetsu no Kuinshī" (Japanese: 伝説のクインシー)	Jun'ya Koshiba	Michiko Yokote	Jun'ya Koshiba	December 14, 2004	November 19, 2006
12	12	"A Gentle Right Arm"; Transliteration: "Yasashii Migiude" (Japanese: やさしい右腕)	Kōji Aritomi	Genki Yoshimura	Kōji Aritomi	December 21, 2004	November 26, 2006
13	13	"Flower and Hollow"; Transliteration: "Hana to Horō" (Japanese: 花とホロウ)	Takuji Kimura	Natsuko Takahashi	Sanzō Tsunoda	December 28, 2004	December 3, 2006
14	14	"Back to Back, a Fight to the Death!"; Transliteration: "Senaka Awase no Shitō!" (Japanese: 背中合わせの死闘！)	Noriyuki Abe	Masashi Sogo	Tetsuhito Saitō	January 11, 2005	December 10, 2006
15	15	"Kon's Great Plan"; Transliteration: "Kon no Uhauha Daisakusen" (Japanese: コンのウハウハ大作戦)	Chiaki Kon	Masahiro Ōkubo	Chiaki Kon	January 18, 2005	December 17, 2006
16	16	"The Encounter, Abarai Renji!"; Transliteration: "Abarai Renji, Kenzan!" (Japanese: 阿散井恋次、見参！)	Jun'ya Koshiba	Michiko Yokote	Motosuke Takahashi	January 25, 2005	January 7, 2007
17	17	"Ichigo Dies!"; Transliteration: "Ichigo, Shisu!" (Japanese: 一護、死す！)	Kazunori Mizuno	Rika Nakase	Manabu Fukazawa	February 1, 2005	January 14, 2007
18	18	"Reclaim! The Power of the Shinigami!"; Transliteration: "Torimodose! Shinigami no Chikara!" (Japanese: 取り戻せ！死神の力！)	Akira Shimizu	Natsuko Takahashi	Jun'ya Koshiba	February 8, 2005	January 21, 2007
19	19	"Ichigo Becomes a Hollow!"; Transliteration: "Ichigo, Horō ni Ochiru!" (Japanese: 一護、ホロウに墜ちる！)	Takuji Kimura	Genki Yoshimura	Tetsuhito Saitō	February 15, 2005	January 28, 2007
20	20	"Ichimaru Gin's Shadow"; Transliteration: "Ichimaru Gin no Kage" (Japanese: 市丸ギンの影)	Shigeki Hatakeyama	Masashi Sogo	Shigeki Hatakeyama	February 22, 2005	February 4, 2007

==== Season 2: The Entry (2005) ====
No. overall	No. in season	Title	Directed by	Written by	Storyboarded by	Original release date	English air date
21	1	"Enter! The World of the Shinigami"; Transliteration: "Totsunyū! Shinigami no Sekai" (Japanese: 突入！死神の世界)	Jun'ya Koshiba	Rika Nakase	Jun'ya Koshiba	March 1, 2005	February 11, 2007
22	2	"The Man Who Hates Shinigami"; Transliteration: "Shinigami o Nikumu Otoko" (Japanese: 死神を憎む男)	Kōji Aritomi	Natsuko Takahashi	Kōji Aritomi	March 8, 2005	February 18, 2007
23	3	"14 Days Before Rukia's Execution"; Transliteration: "Rukia Shokei, Jūyokka Mae" (Japanese: ルキア処刑、14日前)	Kazunori Mizuno	Masahiro Ōkubo	Kazunori Mizuno	March 15, 2005	February 25, 2007
24	4	"Assemble! The 13 Divisions"; Transliteration: "Kesshū! Gotei Jūsantai" (Japanese: 結集！護廷13隊)	Akira Iwanaga	Michiko Yokote	Sanzō Tsunoda	March 22, 2005	March 4, 2007
25	5	"Penetrate the Center with an Enormous Bombshell?"; Transliteration: "Kyodai Hōdan de Chūō Toppa?" (Japanese: 巨大砲弾で中央突破？)	Akira Shimizu	Genki Yoshimura	Tetsuhito Saitō	March 29, 2005	March 11, 2007
26	6	"Formation! The Worst Tag"; Transliteration: "Kessei! Saiaku no Taggu" (Japanese: 結成！最悪のタッグ)	Takuji Kimura	Masashi Sogo	Noriyuki Abe	April 5, 2005	March 18, 2007
27	7	"Release the Death Blow!"; Transliteration: "Hissatsu no Ichigeki o Hanate!" (Japanese: 必殺の一撃を放て！)	Jun'ya Koshiba	Masashi Sogo	Jun'ya Koshiba	April 12, 2005	March 25, 2007
28	8	"Orihime Targeted"; Transliteration: "Nerawareta Orihime" (Japanese: 狙われた織姫)	Keizō Kusakawa	Rika Nakase	Kōji Aritomi	April 19, 2005	April 8, 2007
29	9	"Breakthrough! The Shinigami's Encompassing Net"; Transliteration: "Toppa seyo! Shinigami Hōimō" (Japanese: 突破せよ！死神包囲網)	Shigeki Hatakeyama	Michiko Yokote	Shigeki Hatakeyama	April 26, 2005	April 15, 2007
30	10	"Renji's Confrontation"; Transliteration: "Tachihadakaru Renji" (Japanese: 立ちはだかる恋次)	Jun'ya Koshiba	Masahiro Ōkubo	Motosuke Takahashi	May 3, 2005	April 22, 2007
31	11	"The Resolution to Kill"; Transliteration: "Kiru Tame no Kakugo" (Japanese: 斬る為の覚悟)	Kazunori Mizuno	Natsuko Takahashi	Tetsuhito Saitō	May 10, 2005	April 29, 2007
32	12	"Stars and the Stray"; Transliteration: "Hoshi to Norainu" (Japanese: 星と野良犬)	Takuji Kimura	Genki Yoshimura	Noriyuki Abe	May 17, 2005	May 6, 2007
33	13	"Miracle! The Mysterious New Hero"; Transliteration: "Kiseki! Nazo no Shin Hīrō" (Japanese: 奇跡！謎の新ヒーロー)	Chiaki Kon	Masahiro Ōkubo	Chiaki Kon	May 26, 2005	May 13, 2007
34	14	"Tragedy of Dawn"; Transliteration: "Yoake no Sangeki" (Japanese: 夜明けの惨劇)	Kōji Aritomi	Natsuko Takahashi	Kōji Aritomi	June 1, 2005	May 20, 2007
35	15	"Aizen Assassinated! The Darkness Which Approaches"; Transliteration: "Aizen Ansatsu! Shinobiyoru Yami" (Japanese: 藍染暗殺！忍び寄る闇)	Jun'ya Koshiba	Masashi Sogo	Jun'ya Koshiba	June 7, 2005	May 27, 2007
36	16	"Zaraki Kenpachi Approaches!"; Transliteration: "Zaraki Kenpachi, Semaru!" (Japanese: 更木剣八、迫る！)	Shigeki Hatakeyama	Rika Nakase	Shigeki Hatakeyama	June 14, 2005	June 10, 2007
37	17	"Motive of the Fist"; Transliteration: "Kobushi no Riyū" (Japanese: 拳の理由)	Kazunori Mizuno	Michiko Yokote	Kazunori Mizuno (Note: Credited under the pen name "Ōkura Shirakawa" (白川 巨椋, Shirakawa Ōkura))	June 21, 2005	June 17, 2007
38	18	"Desperation! The Broken Zangetsu"; Transliteration: "Zettaizetsumei! Orareta Zangetsu" (Japanese: 絶体絶命! 折られた斬月)	Mitsutaka Noshitani	Genki Yoshimura	Tetsuhito Saitō	June 28, 2005	June 24, 2007
39	19	"The Immortal Man"; Transliteration: "Fujimi no Otoko" (Japanese: 不死身の男)	Noriyuki Abe	Rika Nakase	Tetsuhito Saitō	July 5, 2005	July 1, 2007
40	20	"The Shinigami Whom Ganju Met"; Transliteration: "Ganju no Mita Shinigami" (Japanese: 岩鷲の見た死神)	Ryō Miyata	Masashi Sogo	Sanzō Tsunoda	July 12, 2005	July 8, 2007
41	21	"Reunion, Ichigo and Rukia"; Transliteration: "Saikai, Ichigo to Rukia" (Japanese: 再会、一護とルキア)	Kōji Aritomi	Natsuko Takahashi	Kōji Aritomi	July 19, 2005	July 15, 2007

==== Season 3: The Rescue (2005–2006) ====
No. overall	No. in season	Title	Directed by	Written by	Storyboarded by	Original release date	English air date
42	1	"Yoruichi, Goddess of Flash, Dances!"; Transliteration: "Shunjin Yoruichi, Mau!" (Japanese: 瞬神夜一、舞う！)	Akira Iwanaga	Michiko Yokote	Jun'ya Koshiba	July 26, 2005	July 22, 2007
43	2	"The Despicable Shinigami"; Transliteration: "Hiretsu na Shinigami" (Japanese: 卑劣な死神)	Jun'ya Koshiba	Michiko Yokote	Motosuke Takahashi	August 2, 2005	July 29, 2007
44	3	"Ishida's Ultimate Power!"; Transliteration: "Ishida, Kyokugen no Chikara!" (Japanese: 石田、極限の力！)	Kazunori Mizuno (Note: Credited under the pen name "Ōkura Shirakawa" (白川 巨椋, Shirakawa Ōkura).)	Masashi Sogo	Satoshi Nishimura	August 9, 2005	August 5, 2007
45	4	"Overcome Your Limits!"; Transliteration: "Genkai o Koero!" (Japanese: 限界を越えろ！)	Kazunobu Shimizu	Genki Yoshimura	Tetsuhito Saitō	August 16, 2005	August 12, 2007
46	5	"Authentic Records! School of Shinigami"; Transliteration: "Jitsuroku! Shinigami no Gakkō" (Japanese: 実録！死神の学校)	Kōji Aritomi	Masahiro Ōkubo	Kōji Aritomi	August 23, 2005	August 19, 2007
47	6	"The Avengers"; Transliteration: "Adautsu Mono-tachi" (Japanese: 仇討つ者たち)	Mitsutaka Noshitani	Natsuko Takahashi	Masami Shimoda	August 30, 2005	September 2, 2007
48	7	"Hitsugaya Roars!"; Transliteration: "Hitsugaya, Hoeru!" (Japanese: 日番谷、吼える！)	Jun'ya Koshiba	Rika Nakase	Jun'ya Koshiba	September 6, 2005	September 9, 2007
49	8	"Rukia's Nightmare"; Transliteration: "Rukia no Akumu" (Japanese: ルキアの悪夢)	Hodaka Kuramoto	Masahiro Ōkubo	Tetsuhito Saitō	September 13, 2005	September 16, 2007
50	9	"The Reviving Lion"; Transliteration: "Yomigaeru Shishi" (Japanese: よみがえる獅子)	Shigeki Hatakeyama	Michiko Yokote	Shin'ichi Watanabe	September 20, 2005	September 23, 2007
51	10	"Morning of the Sentence"; Transliteration: "Shokei no Asa" (Japanese: 処刑の朝)	Yoshinori Odaka	Genki Yoshimura	Jun'ya Koshiba	September 27, 2005	October 7, 2007
52	11	"Renji, Oath of the Soul! Death Match with Byakuya"; Transliteration: "Renji, Tamashii no Chikai! Byakuya to no Shitō" (Japanese: 恋次、魂の誓い！白哉との死闘)	Kōji Aritomi	Masashi Sogo	Kōji Aritomi	October 4, 2005 (Note: Episodes 52 and 53 originally aired together as a one-hour special.)	October 14, 2007
53	12	"Gin Ichimaru's Temptation, Resolution Shattered"; Transliteration: "Ichimaru Gin no Yūwaku, Kuzusareta Kakugo" (Japanese: 市丸ギンの誘惑、崩された覚悟)	Akira Shimizu	Natsuko Takahashi	Akio Kawamura	October 4, 2005	March 2, 2008
54	13	"An Accomplished Oath! Get Back Rukia!"; Transliteration: "Hatasareru Chikai! Rukia Dakkan Naruka!" (Japanese: 果たされる誓い！ルキア奪還なるか)	Kazunori Mizuno (Note: Credited under the pen name "Kumi Hitokuchi" (一口 久美, Hitokuchi Kumi).)	Rika Nakase	Tetsuhito Saitō	October 18, 2005	March 9, 2008
55	14	"The Strongest Shinigami! Ultimate Confrontation Between Teacher and Students"; Transliteration: "Saikyō no Shinigami! Kyūkyoku no Shitei Taiketsu" (Japanese: 最強の死神！究極の師弟対決)	Mitsutaka Noshitani	Masashi Sogo	Jun'ya Koshiba	October 25, 2005	March 16, 2008
56	15	"Supersonic Battle! Determine the Goddess of Battle"; Transliteration: "Chōsoku no Tatakai! Bu no Megami, Kessu" (Japanese: 超速の戦い！武の女神、決す)	Hodaka Kuramoto	Genki Yoshimura	Tetsuya Endō	November 1, 2005	March 23, 2008
57	16	"Senbonzakura, Crushed! Zangetsu Thrusts Through the Sky"; Transliteration: "Senbonzakura, Funsai! Ten o Tsuku Zangetsu" (Japanese: 千本桜、粉砕！天を衝く斬月)	Jun'ya Koshiba	Rika Nakase	Motosuke Takahashi	November 8, 2005	March 30, 2008
58	17	"Unseal! The Black Blade, the Miraculous Power"; Transliteration: "Kaihō! Kuroki Yaiba, Kiseki no Chikara" (Japanese: 開放！黒き刃、奇跡の力)	Noriyuki Abe	Masashi Sogo	Manabu Fukazawa	November 15, 2005	April 6, 2008
59	18	"Conclusion of the Death Match! White Pride and Black Desire"; Transliteration: "Shitō Ketchaku! Shiroki Hokori to Kuroki Omoi" (Japanese: 死闘決着！白き誇りと黒き想い)	Jun'ya Koshiba	Masashi Sogo	Jun'ya Koshiba	November 22, 2005	April 13, 2008
60	19	"Reality of the Despair, the Assassin's Dagger Is Swung"; Transliteration: "Zetsubō no Shinjitsu, Furiorosareta Kyōjin" (Japanese: 絶望の真実、振り下ろされた凶刃)	Kazunori Mizuno	Genki Yoshimura	Akio Kawamura	December 6, 2005	April 20, 2008
61	20	"Aizen Stands! Horrible Ambitions"; Transliteration: "Aizen, Tatsu! Osorubeki Yabō" (Japanese: 藍染、立つ！恐るべき野望)	Akira Shimizu	Masahiro Ōkubo	Tetsuya Endō	December 13, 2005	April 27, 2008
62	21	"Gather Together! Group of the Strongest Shinigami!"; Transliteration: "Shūketsuseyo! Saikyō no Shinigami Shūdan" (Japanese: 集結せよ！最強の死神集団)	Hodaka Kuramoto	Masashi Sogo	Tetsuhito Saitō	December 20, 2005	May 4, 2008
63	22	"Rukia's Resolution, Ichigo's Feelings"; Transliteration: "Rukia no Ketsui, Ichigo no Omoi" (Japanese: ルキアの決意、一護の想い)	Shigeki Hatakeyama	Masashi Sogo	Shigeki Hatakeyama	January 10, 2006 (Note: Episode 63 was an hour-long special.)	May 11, 2008

==== Season 4: The Bount (2006) ====
No. overall	No. in season	Title	Storyboarded by	Directed by	Written by	Original release date	English air date
64	1	"New School Term, Renji Has Come to the Material World?!"; Transliteration: "Shingakki, Gense ni Renji ga Yatte Kita!?" (Japanese: 新学期、現世に恋次がやって来た!?)	Noriyuki Abe	Mitsutaka Noshitani	Masashi Sogo	January 17, 2006	May 18, 2008
65	2	"Creeping Terror, the Second Victim"; Transliteration: "Shinobi yoru Kyōfu, Nibanme no Giseisha" (Japanese: 忍び寄る恐怖、2番目の犠牲者)	Jun'ya Koshiba	Jun'ya Koshiba	Masashi Sogo	January 24, 2006	May 25, 2008
66	3	"Breakthrough! The Trap Hidden in the Labyrinth"; Transliteration: "Toppa seyo! Meikyū ni Hisomu Wana" (Japanese: 突破せよ！迷宮に潜む罠)	Shigeru Ueda	Shigeru Ueda	Masahiro Ōkubo	January 31, 2006	June 1, 2008
67	4	"Death Game! The Missing Classmate"; Transliteration: "Shi no Gēmu! Kieru Kurasumeito" (Japanese: 死のゲーム！消えるクラスメイト)	Motosuke Takahashi	Jun'ya Koshiba	Rika Nakase	February 7, 2006	June 8, 2008
68	5	"True Identity of the Devil, the Secret which Is Revealed"; Transliteration: "Akuma no Shōtai, Akasareta Himitsu" (Japanese: 悪魔の正体、明かされた秘密)	Noriyuki Abe	Akira Shimizu	Masashi Sogo	February 14, 2006 (Note: Episodes 68 and 69 originally aired together as a one-hour special.)	June 15, 2008
69	6	"Bount! The Ones Who Hunt Souls"; Transliteration: "Baunto! Tamashii o Karu Mono-tachi" (Japanese: バウント！魂を狩る者たち)	Tetsuhito Saitō	Kazunori Mizuno	Genki Yoshimura	February 14, 2006	June 22, 2008
70	7	"Rukia's Return! Revival of the Substitute Team!"; Transliteration: "Rukia no Kikan! Daikō Chīmu Fukkatsu" (Japanese: ルキアの帰還！代行チーム復活)	Masami Shimoda	Mitsutaka Noshitani	Michiko Yokote	February 21, 2006	June 29, 2008
71	8	"The Moment of Collision! An Evil Hand Draws Near to the Quincy"; Transliteration: "Gekitotsu no Toki! Kuinshī ni Semaru Ma no Te" (Japanese: 激突の時！クインシーに迫る魔の手)	Tetsuhito Saitō	Hodaka Kuramoto	Rika Nakase	March 7, 2006	July 6, 2008
72	9	"Water Attack! Escape from the Shutdown Hospital"; Transliteration: "Mizu no Kōgeki! Tozasareta Byōin kara no Dasshutsu" (Japanese: 水の攻撃！閉ざされた病院からの脱出)	Rei Kaneko	Kazunori Mizuno	Genki Yoshimura	March 14, 2006	July 13, 2008
73	10	"Gathering Bounts! The Man Who Makes His Move"; Transliteration: "Baunto Shūketsu! Ugokidasu Otoko" (Japanese: バウント集結！動き出す男)	Jun'ya Koshiba	Jun'ya Koshiba	Masashi Sogo	March 28, 2006 (Note: Episodes 73 and 74 originally aired together as a one-hour special.)	July 20, 2008
74	11	"Memories of an Eternally Living Clan"; Transliteration: "Eien o Ikiru Ichizoku no Kioku" (Japanese: 永遠を生きる一族の記憶)	Tetsuhito Saitō	Tetsuhito Saitō	Natsuko Takahashi	March 28, 2006	July 26, 2008
75	12	"Earth-Shattering Event at 11th Squad! The Shinigami Who Rises Again"; Transliteration: "Jūichibantai Gekishin! Yomigaetta Shinigami" (Japanese: 十一番隊激震！よみがえった死神)	Jun'ya Koshiba	Takeshi Shirai	Michiko Yokote	April 4, 2006 (Note: Episodes 75 and 76 originally aired together as a one-hour special.)	August 2, 2008
76	13	"Crashing Force! Fried vs. Zangetsu"; Transliteration: "Chikara no Gekitotsu! Furīdo VS Zangetsu" (Japanese: 力の激突！フリードVS斬月)	Norihiro Sunagawa	Mitsutaka Noshitani	Masahiro Ōkubo	April 4, 2006	August 10, 2008
77	14	"Unfading Grudge! The Shinigami whom Kenpachi Killed"; Transliteration: "Kienu Onnen! Kenpachi ga Kitta Shinigami" (Japanese: 消えぬ怨念！剣八が斬った死神)	Hodaka Kuramoto Tetsuhito Saitō	Hodaka Kuramoto	Rika Nakase	April 11, 2006	August 24, 2008
78	15	"Shocking Revelations for the 13 Divisions!! The Truth Buried in History"; Transliteration: "Gotei Jūsantai Kyōgaku!! Rekishi ni Uzumoreta Shinjitsu" (Japanese: 護廷十三隊驚愕!!歴史に埋もれた真実)	Motosuke Takahashi	Jun'ya Koshiba	Masashi Sogo	May 2, 2006	August 31, 2008
79	16	"Yoshino's Decision of Death"; Transliteration: "Yoshino, Shi o Kaketa Omoi" (Japanese: 芳野、死をかけた想い)	Manabu Fukazawa	Takeshi Shirai	Genki Yoshimura	May 9, 2006	September 7, 2008
80	17	"Assault from a Formidable Enemy! A Tiny Final Line of Defense?!"; Transliteration: "Kyōteki no Kyūshū! Chiisana Saishū Bōei Sen!?" (Japanese: 強敵の急襲！小さな最終防衛線!?)	Hitoyuki Matsui	Shigeru Ueda	Masahiro Ōkubo	May 16, 2006	September 13, 2008
81	18	"Hitsugaya Moves! The Attacked City"; Transliteration: "Hitsugaya Ugoku! Osowareta Machi" (Japanese: 日番谷動く！襲われた街)	Tetsuhito Saitō	Eitarō Ano	Masashi Sogo	May 23, 2006	September 20, 2008
82	19	"Ichigo vs. Dalk! Appearance of the Faded Darkness"; Transliteration: "Ichigo VS Daruku! Shirakigami no Shutsugen" (Japanese: 一護VSダルク！白き闇の出現)	Jun'ya Koshiba	Kazunori Mizuno	Michiko Yokote	May 30, 2006	October 4, 2008
83	20	"Grey Shadow, the Secret of the Dolls"; Transliteration: "Haiiro no Kage, Dōru no Himitsu" (Japanese: 灰色の影、ドールの秘密)	Jun Takada	Akira Shimizu	Natsuko Takahashi	June 6, 2006	October 11, 2008
84	21	"Dissension in the Substitute Team? Rukia's Betrayal"; Transliteration: "Daikō Chīmu Bunretsu? Uragitta Rukia" (Japanese: 代行チーム分裂？裏切ったルキア)	Tetsuya Endō	Takeshi Shirai	Rika Nakase	June 13, 2006 (Note: Episodes 84 and 85 originally aired together as a one-hour special due to the 2006 World Cup.)	October 18, 2008
85	22	"Deadly Battle of Tears! Rukia vs. Orihime"; Transliteration: "Namida no Shitō! Rukia VS Orihime" (Japanese: 涙の死闘！ルキアVS織姫)	Mitsutaka Noshitani	Mitsutaka Noshitani	Masashi Sogo	June 13, 2006	October 25, 2008
86	23	"Rangiku Dances! Slice the Invisible Enemy!"; Transliteration: "Rangiku Mau! Mienai Teki o Kire!" (Japanese: 乱菊舞う！見えない敵を斬れ)	Tetsuhito Saitō	Hodaka Kuramoto	Masahiro Ōkubo	June 20, 2006	November 1, 2008
87	24	"Byakuya is summoned! The Gotei 13 start to move!" Transliteration: "Byakuya Shōshū! Ugokidasu Gotei Jūsantai" (Japanese: 白哉召集！動き出す護廷十三隊)	Kazunori Mizuno	Kazunori Mizuno	Masahiro Ōkubo Masashi Sogo	July 4, 2006	November 9, 2008
88	25	"Annihilation of the Lieutenants!? Trap in the Underground Cave"; Transliteration: "Fukutaichō Zenmetsu!? Chika Dōkutsu no Wana" (Japanese: 副隊長全滅!?地下洞窟の罠)	Jun Takada	Eitarō Ano	Masashi Sogo	July 11, 2006	November 16, 2008
89	26	"Rematch?! Ishida vs. Nemu"; Transliteration: "Saisen!? Ishida VS Nemu" (Japanese: 再戦!?石田VSネム)	Tetsuhito Saitō	Takeshi Shirai	Masashi Sogo	July 18, 2006	November 23, 2008
90	27	"Renji Abarai, Bankai of the Soul!"; Transliteration: "Abarai Renji, Tamashii no Bankai!" (Japanese: 阿散井恋次、魂の卍解！)	Motosuke Takahashi	Jun'ya Koshiba	Masashi Sogo	July 25, 2006	November 30, 2008
91	28	"Shinigami and Quincy, the Reviving Power"; Transliteration: "Shinigami to Kuinshī, Yomigaeru Chikara" (Japanese: 死神とクインシー、よみがえる力)	Manabu Fukazawa	Shigeru Ueda	Masashi Sogo	August 1, 2006	December 7, 2008

==== Season 5: The Assault (2006–2007) ====
No. overall	No. in season	Title	Storyboarded by	Directed by	Written by	Original release date	English air date
92	1	"Invasion of the Shinigami World, Again"; Transliteration: "Shinigami Sekai e no Totsunyū, Futatabi" (Japanese: 死神世界への突入、再び)	Jun'ya Koshiba	Akira Shimizu	Masashi Sogo	August 8, 2006	December 14, 2008
93	2	"The Bount Assault! The Gotei 13 of Destructive Earthquake"; Transliteration: "Baunto Kyōshū! Gekishin no Gotei Jūsantai" (Japanese: バウント強襲！激震の護廷十三隊)	Tetsuhito Saitō	Hodaka Kuramoto	Rika Nakase	August 15, 2006	December 21, 2008
94	3	"Hitsugaya's Decision! The Clash Approaches"; Transliteration: "Hitsugaya no Ketsui! Gekitotsu no Toki Semaru" (Japanese: 日番谷の決意！激突の時迫る)	Mitsutaka Noshitani	Mitsutaka Noshitani	Michiko Yokote	August 22, 2006	December 28, 2008
95	4	"Byakuya Takes the Field! Dance of the Wind-Splitting Cherry Blossoms"; Transliteration: "Byakuya Shutsujin! Kaze o Saku Sakura no Mai" (Japanese: 白哉出陣！風を裂く桜の舞)	Jun Takada	Takeshi Shirai	Masashi Sogo	September 5, 2006	January 4, 2009
96	5	"Ichigo, Byakuya, Kariya, The Battle of the Three Extremes!"; Transliteration: "Ichigo, Byakuya, Kariya, Sankyoku no Tatakai!" (Japanese: 一護・白哉・狩矢、三極の戦い！)	Tetsuhito Saitō	Eitarō Ano	Masashi Sogo	September 12, 2006	January 11, 2009
97	6	"Hitsugaya Strikes! Slice the Enemy in the Middle of the Forest"; Transliteration: "Hitsugaya Shutsugeki! Mori no Naka no Teki o Kire!" (Japanese: 日番谷出撃！森の中の敵を斬れ)	Kazunori Mizuno	Kazunori Mizuno	Masashi Sogo	September 19, 2006	January 18, 2009
98	7	"Clash! Kenpachi Zaraki vs. Maki Ichinose"; Transliteration: "Gekitotsu! Zaraki Kenpachi VS Ichinose Maki" (Japanese: 激突！更木剣八VS一之瀬真樹)	Norihiro Sunagawa	Hodaka Kuramoto	Masahiro Ōkubo	October 4, 2006	January 25, 2009
99	8	"Shinigami vs. Shinigami! The Uncontrollable Power"; Transliteration: "Shinigami VS shinigami! Bōsō suru Chikara" (Japanese: 死神VS死神！暴走する力)	Jun'ya Koshiba	Akira Shimizu	Masashi Sogo	October 11, 2006	February 1, 2009
100	9	"Suì-Fēng Dies? The Last of the Special Forces"; Transliteration: "Soifon Shisu? Onmitsukidō no Saigo" (Japanese: 砕蜂死す？隠密機動の最後)	Motosuke Takahashi	Jun'ya Koshiba	Masashi Sogo	October 18, 2006	February 8, 2009
101	10	"Mayuri's Bankai!! Sawatari: Clash of the Demon"; Transliteration: "Mayuri Bankai!! Sawatari: Akuma no Gekitotsu" (Japanese: マユリ卍解!!沢渡・悪魔の激突)	Kensuke Aiba	Mitsutaka Noshitani	Masahiro Ōkubo	November 1, 2006	February 15, 2009
102	11	"The Last Quincy! The Exploding Power"; Transliteration: "Saigo no Kuinshī! Bōhatsu suru Chikara" (Japanese: 最後のクインシー！暴発する力)	Tetsuhito Saitō	Takeshi Shirai	Masashi Sogo	November 8, 2006	February 22, 2009
103	12	"Ishida, Exceeding the Limits to Attack!"; Transliteration: "Ishida, Genkai o Koete Ute!" (Japanese: 石田、限界を超えて撃て！)	Jun Takada	Hiroaki Nishimura	Masashi Sogo	November 15, 2006	March 1, 2009
104	13	"10th Division's Death Struggle! The Release of Hyōrinmaru"; Transliteration: "Shitō Jūbantai! Hyōrinmaru o Hanate" (Japanese: 死闘十番隊！氷輪丸を放て)	Jun'ya Koshiba	Eitarō Ano	Masashi Sogo	November 22, 2006	March 8, 2009
105	14	"Kariya! Countdown to the Detonation"; Transliteration: "Kariya! Bakuhatsu e no Kauntodaun" (Japanese: 狩矢！爆発へのカウントダウン)	Kazunori Mizuno	Kazunori Mizuno	Masahiro Ōkubo	November 29, 2006	March 15, 2009
106	15	"Life and Revenge! Ishida, the Ultimate Choice"; Transliteration: "Inochi to Fukushū! Ishida, Kyūkyoku no Sentaku" (Japanese: 命と復讐！石田、究極の選択)	Tetsuhito Saitō	Akira Shimizu	Masashi Sogo	December 6, 2006	March 22, 2009
107	16	"The Swung-Down Edge! The Moment of Ruin"; Transliteration: "Furiorosareta Yaiba! Hametsu no Shunkan" (Japanese: 振り下ろされた刃！破滅の瞬間)	Jun Takada	Hodaka Kuramoto	Masashi Sogo	December 13, 2006	March 29, 2009
108	17	"The Wailing Bount! The Last Clash"; Transliteration: "Dōkoku no Baunto! Saigo no Gekitotsu" (Japanese: 慟哭のバウント！最後の激突)	Manabu Fukazawa	Takeshi Shirai	Masashi Sogo	December 20, 2006	April 5, 2009
109	18	"Ichigo and Rukia, Thoughts in the Revolving Around Heaven"; Transliteration: "Ichigo to Rukia, Kaiten suru Omoi" (Japanese: 一護とルキア、廻天する想い)	Kensuke Aiba	Mitsutaka Noshitani	Masashi Sogo	January 4, 2007	April 12, 2009

==== Season 6: Arrancar: The Appearance (2007) ====
No. overall	No. in season	Title	Storyboarded by	Directed by	Written by	Original release date	English air date
110	1	"Reopening of the Substitute Business! The Terrifying Transfer Student"; Transliteration: "Daikōgyō Saikai! Kyōfu no Tenkōsei" (Japanese: 代行業再開！恐怖の転校生)	Jun'ya Koshiba	Hiroaki Nishimura	Genki Yoshimura	January 10, 2007	April 19, 2009
111	2	"Shock! The True Identities of the Fathers"; Transliteration: "Kyōgaku! Oyajitachi no Shōtai" (Japanese: 驚愕！親父達の正体)	Motosuke Takahashi	Eitarō Ano	Michiko Yokote	January 17, 2007	April 19, 2009
112	3	"The Commencement of War, Vizards and the Arrancars"; Transliteration: "Tatakai no Hajimari, Vaizādo to Arankaru" (Japanese: 戦いの始まり、仮面の軍勢と破面)	Motosuke Takahashi	Jun'ya Koshiba	Masahiro Ōkubo	January 24, 2007	May 3, 2009
113	4	"Prelude to the Apocalypse, The Arrancar's Offensive"; Transliteration: "Sekai Hōkai e no Jokyoku, Arankaru Shūrai" (Japanese: 世界崩壊への序曲、アランカル襲来！)	Masami Shimoda	Akira Shimizu	Masashi Sogo	January 31, 2007	May 3, 2009
114	5	"Reunion, Ichigo and Rukia and Shinigami"; Transliteration: "Saikai, Ichigo to Rukia to Shinigami-tachi" (Japanese: 再会、一護とルキアと死神たち)	Kazunori Mizuno	Kazunori Mizuno	Natsuko Takahashi	February 7, 2007	May 10, 2009
115	6	"Mission! The Shinigami Have Come"; Transliteration: "Tokumei! Yatte Kita Shinigami-tachi" (Japanese: 特命！やってきた死神たち)	Jun Takada	Hodaka Kuramoto	Masashi Sogo	February 14, 2007	May 10, 2009
116	7	"The Evil Eye, Aizen Returns"; Transliteration: "Ashiki Hitomi, Aizen Futatabi" (Japanese: 悪しき瞳、藍染再び)	Natsuko Suzuki	Mitsutaka Noshitani	Genki Yoshimura	February 21, 2007	May 17, 2009
117	8	"Rukia's Battle Commences! The Freezing White Blade"; Transliteration: "Rukia Sentō Kaishi! Kōritsuku Shiroi Yaiba" (Japanese: ルキア戦闘開始！凍りつく白い刃)	Tetsuhito Saitō	Hiroaki Nishimura	Masahiro Ōkubo	February 28, 2007	May 17, 2009
118	9	"Ikkaku's Bankai! The Power That Breaks Everything"; Transliteration: "Ikkaku Bankai! Subete o Kudaku Chikara" (Japanese: 一角卍解！全てを砕く力)	Jun'ya Koshiba	Yūji Sekimoto	Rika Nakase	March 7, 2007	May 24, 2009
119	10	"Zaraki Division's Secret Story! The Lucky Men"; Transliteration: "Zaraki Tai Hiwa! Tsuite iru Otokotachi" (Japanese: 更木隊秘話！ツイている男たち)	Tetsuhito Saitō	Takeshi Shirai	Michiko Yokote	March 21, 2007	May 24, 2009
120	11	"Hitsugaya Scatters! The Broken Hyōrinmaru"; Transliteration: "Hitsugaya Chiru! Kudaketa Hyōrinmaru" (Japanese: 日番谷散る！砕けた氷輪丸)	Jun Takada	Yukio Okazaki	Genki Yoshimura	March 28, 2007	May 31, 2009
121	12	"Clash! The Protector vs. The Bearer"; Transliteration: "Gekitotsu! Mamoru Mono VS Kōmuru Mono" (Japanese: 激突！護る者VS被る者)	Kazunori Mizuno	Kazunori Mizuno	Masashi Sogo	April 11, 2007	May 31, 2009
122	13	"Vizard! The Power of the Awakened"; Transliteration: "Vaizādo! Mezameshi Mono-tachi no Chikara" (Japanese: ヴァイザード！目覚めし者たちの力)	Motosuke Takahashi	Jun'ya Koshiba	Natsuko Takahashi	April 18, 2007	June 7, 2009
123	14	"Ichigo, Complete Hollowification!?"; Transliteration: "Ichigo, Kanzen Horō-ka!?" (Japanese: 一護、完全ホロウ化!?)	Tetsuhito Saitō	Mitsutaka Noshitani	Michiko Yokote	April 25, 2007	June 7, 2009
124	15	"Collision! Black Bankai and the White Bankai"; Transliteration: "Gekitotsu! Kuroi Bankai to Shiroi Bankai" (Japanese: 激突！黒い卍解と白い卍解)	Manabu Fukazawa	Takeshi Shirai	Masashi Sogo	May 2, 2007	June 14, 2009
125	16	"Urgent Report! Aizen's Terrifying Plan!"; Transliteration: "Kinkyū Hōkoku! Aizen no Osorubeki Keikaku!" (Japanese: 緊急報告！藍染の恐るべき計画)	Hiroki Takagi	Noriyuki Abe	Masahiro Ōkubo	May 9, 2007	June 14, 2009
126	17	"Uryū vs. Ryūken! Clash of the Parent-Child Quincys"; Transliteration: "Uryū VS Ryūken! Gekitotsu Kuinshī Oyako" (Japanese: 雨竜VS竜弦！激突クインシー親子)	Hodaka Kuramoto Takeshi Shirai	Hodaka Kuramoto Takeshi Shirai	Natsuko Takahashi	May 16, 2007	June 21, 2009
127	18	"Urahara's Decision, Orihime's Thoughts"; Transliteration: "Urahara no Ketsudan, Orihime no Omoi" (Japanese: 浦原の決断、織姫の想い)	Jun'ya Koshiba	Hiroaki Nishimura	Masahiro Ōkubo	May 30, 2007	June 21, 2009
128	19	"The Nightmare Arrancar! Team Hitsugaya Moves Out"; Transliteration: "Akumu no Arankaru! Hitsugayatai Shutsugeki" (Japanese: 悪夢のアランカル！日番谷隊出撃)	Jun'ya Koshiba	Hodaka Kuramoto	Masashi Sogo	June 6, 2007	June 28, 2009
129	20	"The Swooping Descent of the Dark Emissary! The Propagation of Malice"; Transliteration: "Maiorita Yami no Shisha! Zōshoku suru Akui" (Japanese: 舞い降りた闇の使者！増殖する悪意)	Motosuke Takahashi	Yukio Okazaki	Masashi Sogo	June 13, 2007	June 28, 2009
130	21	"The Invisible Enemy! Hitsugaya's Merciless Decision"; Transliteration: "Mienai Teki! Hitsugaya, Hijō na Ketsudan" (Japanese: 見えない敵！日番谷、非情な決断)	Jun'ya Koshiba	Mitsutaka Noshitani	Masashi Sogo	June 20, 2007	July 5, 2009
131	22	"Rangiku's Tears, the Sorrowful Parting of Brother and Sister"; Transliteration: "Rangiku no Namida, Kanashiki Kyōdai no Wakare" (Japanese: 乱菊の涙、哀しき兄妹の別れ)	Makoto Itō	Matsuo Asami	Masashi Sogo	June 27, 2007	July 12, 2009

==== Season 7: The Arrancar Part 2: The Hueco Mundo Sneak Entry (2007) ====
No. overall	No. in season	Title	Storyboarded by	Directed by	Written by	Original release date	English air date
132	1	"Hitsugaya, Karin, and Soccer Ball"; Transliteration: "Hitsugaya to Karin to Sakkā Bōru" (Japanese: 日番谷と夏梨とサッカーボール)	Tetsuhito Saitō	Noriyuki Abe Yasuhito Nishikata	Rika Nakase	July 4, 2007	July 12, 2009
133	2	"Ikkaku: The Hot-Blooded Kendo Tale"; Transliteration: "Ikkaku, Nekketsu Kendō Monogatari" (Japanese: 一角、熱血剣道物語)	Kazunori Mizuno	Kazunori Mizuno (Note: Credited under the pen name "Ōkura Shirakawa" (白川 巨椋, Shirakawa Ōkura).)	Natsuko Takahashi	July 11, 2007	July 19, 2009
134	3	"The Beautiful Patissier, Yumichika!"; Transliteration: "Utsukushiki Patishie, Yumichika!" (Japanese: 美しきパティシエ、弓親！)	Takeshi Shirai Hodaka Kuramoto Yasuhito Nishikata	Kiyomu Fukuda	Masashi Sogo	July 18, 2007	July 19, 2009
135	4	"Kon is Deceived! Rangiku on the Lookout..."; Transliteration: "Hakarareta Kon! Rangiku wa Mite Ita..." (Japanese: はかられたコン！乱菊は見ていた…)	Jun'ya Koshiba	Takeshi Shirai	Masahiro Ōkubo	July 25, 2007	July 26, 2009
136	5	"Civil War in Hueco Mundo! Ulquiorra's Death"; Transliteration: "Weko Mundo Nairan! Urukiora no Shi" (Japanese: ウェコムンド内乱！ウルキオラの死)	Noriyuki Abe Yasuhito Nishikata	Yukio Okazaki	Masashi Sogo	August 8, 2007	July 26, 2009
137	6	"The Malicious Battle, Aizen's Trap"; Transliteration: "Akui no Tatakai, Aizen no Wana" (Japanese: 悪意の戦い、藍染の罠)	Manabu Fukazawa	Hodaka Kuramoto	Masashi Sogo	August 22, 2007	August 2, 2009
138	7	"Hueco Mundo moves again! Hitsugaya vs. Yammy"; Transliteration: "Weko Mundo Saidō! Hitsugaya VS Yamī" (Japanese: ウェコムンド再動！日番谷VSヤミー)	Motosuke Takahashi	Jun'ya Koshiba	Michiko Yokote	August 29, 2007	August 2, 2009
139	8	"Ichigo vs. Grimmjow, the 11-second battle!" Transliteration: "Ichigo VS Gurimujō, Jū-ichi Byō no tatakai!" (Japanese: 一護VSグリムジョー、11秒の戦い)	Tetsuhito Saitō Natsuko Suzuki	Mitsutaka Noshitani	Masashi Sogo	September 5, 2007	August 9, 2009
140	9	"Ulquiorra's Scheme, the Moment when the Sun Sets!"; Transliteration: "Sakubō no Urukiora, Taiyō ga Shizumu Toki" (Japanese: 策謀のウルキオラ、太陽が沈む時)	Jun'ya Koshiba	Yasuhito Nishikata	Masashi Sogo	September 12, 2007	August 9, 2009
141	10	"Goodbye..., Kurosaki!"; Transliteration: "Sayonara..., Kurosaki-kun!" (Japanese: さようなら…、黒崎くん)	Hiroki Takagi	Tomoko Hiramuki	Rika Nakase	September 19, 2007	August 16, 2009
142	11	"Strict Order! The Forbidden Rescue of Orihime Inoue"; Transliteration: "Genmei! Inoue Orihime no Kyushūtsu o Kinzu" (Japanese: 厳命！井上織姫ノ救出ヲ禁ズ)	Masami Shimoda	Hiroaki Nishimura	Natsuko Takahashi	September 26, 2007	August 16, 2009
143	12	"Grimmjow Revived"; Transliteration: "Fukkatsu no Gurimujō" (Japanese: 復活のグリムジョー)	Takeshi Shirai	Takeshi Shirai	Genki Yoshimura	October 3, 2007	August 23, 2009
144	13	"Ishida and Chad, The Quickening of a New Power"; Transliteration: "Ishida, Chado, Atarashiki Chikara no taidō" (Japanese: 石田・チャド、新しき力の胎動)	Jun'ya Koshiba	Yukio Okazaki	Rika Nakase	October 17, 2007	August 23, 2009
145	14	"The Espada Gather! Aizen's Royal Assembly"; Transliteration: "Esupāda Shūketsu! Aizen no Gozen Kaigi" (Japanese: エスパーダ集結！藍染の御前会議)	Masami Anno	Yasuo Iwamoto	Masashi Sogo	October 24, 2007	August 30, 2009
146	15	"The Name's Nel! The Appearance of a Strange Arrancar"; Transliteration: "Sono Na wa Neru! Fushigi na Arankaru Tōjō" (Japanese: その名はネル！不思議なアランカル登場)	Natsuko Suzuki	Mitsutaka Noshitani	Natsuko Takahashi	October 31, 2007	August 30, 2009
147	16	"Forest of Menos! Search for the Missing Rukia"; Transliteration: "Menosu no Mori! Kieta Rukia o Sakase" (Japanese: メノスの森！消えたルキアを探せ)	Hodaka Kuramoto Takeshi Shirai	Hodaka Kuramoto	Masashi Sogo	November 7, 2007	September 13, 2009
148	17	"Ashido, The Shinigami Who Came from the Past"; Transliteration: "Ashido, Kako kara Kita Shinigami" (Japanese: アシド、過去から来た死神)	Yasuhito Nishikata	Hideo Ikari	Masashi Sogo	November 14, 2007	September 13, 2009
149	18	"Through the Crumbling Forest, a Million Menos"; Transliteration: "Kuzureiku Mori, Hyakuman no Menosu" (Japanese: 崩れ行く森、百万のメノス)	Jun'ya Koshiba	Hiroaki Nishimura	Masashi Sogo	November 21, 2007	September 20, 2009
150	19	"Oath! Back Here Alive Again"; Transliteration: "Chikai! Futatabi Ikite Kono Basho e" (Japanese: 誓い！再び生きてこの場所へ)	Masami Shimoda	Kiyomu Fukuda	Genki Yoshimura	November 28, 2007	September 20, 2009
151	20	"The Raging Storm! Encounter with the Dancing Arrancar"; Transliteration: "Fukiareru Bōfū! Odoru Arankaru to no Sōgū" (Japanese: 吹き荒れる暴風！踊るアランカルとの遭遇)	Akio Kawamura	Yukio Okazaki	Masahiro Ōkubo	December 5, 2007	September 27, 2009

==== Season 8: The Arrancar Part 3: The Fierce Fight (2007–2008) ====
No. overall	No. in season	Title	Storyboarded by	Directed by	Written by	Original release date	English air date
152	1	"Ichigo Strikes Back! This Is My Bankai"; Transliteration: "Ichigo Hangeki! Koitsu ga Ore no Bankai da" (Japanese: 一護反撃！こいつが俺の卍解だ)	Yasuhito Nishikata	Tomoko Hiramuki	Masashi Sogo	December 12, 2007	September 27, 2009
153	2	"The Devilish Research! Szayelaporro's Plan"; Transliteration: "Akuma no Kenkyū! Zaeruaporo no Takurami" (Japanese: 悪魔の研究！ザエルアポロの企み)	Takeshi Shirai Natsuko Suzuki	Mitsutaka Noshitani	Masashi Sogo	December 19, 2007	October 4, 2009
154	3	"Rukia and Kaien, the Sorrowful Reunion"; Transliteration: "Rukia to Kaien, Kanashimi no Saikai" (Japanese: ルキアと海燕、哀しみの再会)	Hitoyuki Matsui	Yasuo Iwamoto	Rika Nakase	December 26, 2007	October 4, 2009
155	4	"Rukia Retaliates! Release the Desperate Kidō"; Transliteration: "Rukia Hangeki! Kesshi no Kidō o Hanate" (Japanese: ルキア反撃！決死の鬼道を放て)	Masami Anno	Mitsue Yamazaki	Masahiro Ōkubo	January 9, 2008	October 11, 2009
156	5	"Ishida & Pesche, the United Attack of Friendship"; Transliteration: "Ishida & Pesshe, Yūjō no Gattai Kōgeki" (Japanese: 石田&ペッシェ、友情の合体攻撃)	Masami Shimoda	Hodaka Kuramoto	Natsuko Takahashi	January 16, 2008	October 11, 2009
157	6	"Ishida's Trump Card, Seele Schneider"; Transliteration: "Ishida no Kirifuda, Tamashii o Kirisaku Mono" (Japanese: 石田の切り札、魂を切り裂くもの)	Shigenori Kageyama	Hiroaki Nishimura	Masashi Sogo	January 23, 2008	October 18, 2009
158	7	"Right Arm of the Giant, Left Arm of the Devil"; Transliteration: "Kyojin no Uwan, Akuma no Sawan" (Japanese: 巨人の右腕、悪魔の左腕)	Jun'ya Koshiba	Yukio Okazaki	Masashi Sogo	January 30, 2008	October 18, 2009
159	8	"Yasutora Sado Dies! Orihime's Tears"; Transliteration: "Sado Yasutora Shisu! Orihime no Namida" (Japanese: 茶渡泰虎死す！織姫の涙)	Shigenori Kageyama	Kiyomu Fukuda	Rika Nakase	February 6, 2008	October 25, 2009
160	9	"Testament, Your Heart is Right Here..."; Transliteration: "Yuigon, Kokoro wa Koko ni..." (Japanese: 遺言、心はここに…)	Masami Anno	Mitsutaka Noshitani	Genki Yoshimura	February 13, 2008	October 25, 2009
161	10	"The Cruel Arrancar, Ulquiorra's Provocation"; Transliteration: "Zankoku na Arankaru, Urukiora no Chōhatsu" (Japanese: 残酷な破面、ウルキオラの挑発)	Masami Shimoda	Tomoko Hiramuki	Masahiro Ōkubo	February 20, 2008	Noviembre 1, 2009
162	11	"Szayelaporro Laughs, The Net Trapping Renji is Complete"; Transliteration: "Warau Zaeruaporo, Renji Hōimō Kansei" (Japanese: 笑うザエルアポロ、恋次包囲網完成)	Jun Kamiya	Hodaka Kuramoto	Michiko Yokote	February 27, 2008	November 1, 2009
163	12	"Shinigami and Quincy, The Battle with Madness"; Transliteration: "Shinigami to Kuinshī, Kyōki to no Tatakai" (Japanese: 死神とクインシー、狂気との戦い)	Shigenori Kageyama	Kiyomu Fukuda	Masahiro Ōkubo	March 5, 2008	November 8, 2009
164	13	"Ishida's Strategy, 20-Second Offense and Defense"; Transliteration: "Ishida no Sakusen, Nijūbyō no Kōbō" (Japanese: 石田の作戦、20秒の攻防)	Masami Shimoda	Yasuhito Nishikata	Genki Yoshimura	March 12, 2008	November 8, 2009
165	14	"The Murderous Intent Boils! The Joyful Grimmjow"; Transliteration: "Satsui Futtō! Kanki no Gurimujō" (Japanese: 殺意沸騰！歓喜のグリムジョー)	Masami Shimoda	Akira Shimizu	Michiko Yokote	March 19, 2008	November 15, 2009
166	15	"Desperate Effort vs. Desperate Effort! Hollowfied Ichigo"; Transliteration: "Shiryoku vs. Shiryoku! Horōkashita Ichigo" (Japanese: 死力VS死力！ホロウ化した一護)	Tetsuhito Saitō	Kazunori Mizuno	Natsuko Takahashi	April 9, 2008	November 15, 2009
167	16	"The Moment of Conclusion, The End of Grimmjow"; Transliteration: "Ketchaku no Toki, Gurimujō no Saigo" (Japanese: 決着の時、グリムジョーの最後)	Jun'ya Koshiba	Hiroaki Nishimura	Masashi Sogo	April 16, 2008	November 22, 2009

==== Season 9: The New Captain Shūsuke Amagai (2008) ====
No. overall	No. in season	Title	Storyboarded by	Directed by	Written by	Original release date	English air date
168	1	"The New Captain Appears! His Name Is Shūsuke Amagai"; Transliteration: "Shin Taichō Tōjō! Sono Namae wa Amagai Shūsuke" (Japanese: 新隊長登場！その名前は天貝繍助)	Natsuko Suzuki	Mitsutaka Noshitani	Masashi Sogo	April 23, 2008	August 29, 2010
169	2	"New Development, the Dangerous Transfer Student Appears!"; Transliteration: "Shin Tenkai, Kiken na Tenkōsei Arawaru!" (Japanese: 新展開、危険な転校生現る！)	Noriyuki Abe	Yasuhito Nishikata	Masashi Sogo	May 7, 2008	September 5, 2010
170	3	"Desperate Struggle Under the Moonlit Night, the Mysterious Assassin and Zanpakutō"; Transliteration: "Tsukiyo no Shitō, Nazo no Shikaku to Zanpakutō" (Japanese: 月夜の死闘、謎の刺客と斬魄刀)	Shigenori Kageyama	Kiyomu Fukuda	Masashi Sogo	May 14, 2008	September 12, 2010
171	4	"Kenryū, the Profusion of Blooming Crimson Flowers"; Transliteration: "Kenryū, Sakimidareru Beni no Hana" (Japanese: 犬龍、咲き乱れる紅の華)	Takeshi Shirai Yasuhito Nishikata	Tomoko Hiramuki	Genki Yoshimura	May 21, 2008	September 19, 2010
172	5	"Kibune Goes to War! The Violent Wind that Rages"; Transliteration: "Kibune Shutsujin! Fukiareru Reppū" (Japanese: 貴船出陣！吹き荒れる烈風)	Jun'ya Koshiba	Akira Shimizu	Masahiro Ōkubo	May 28, 2008	September 26, 2010
173	6	"The Appearance of the Great Evil! The Darkness in the House of Kasumiōji"; Transliteration: "Kyoaku no Tōjō! Kasumiōji-ka no Yami" (Japanese: 巨悪の登場！霞大路家の闇)	Hodaka Kuramoto	Hodaka Kuramoto	Rika Nakase	June 4, 2008	October 3, 2010
174	7	"Break the Mirror's Boundary! Ichigo's Captivity"; Transliteration: "Kagami no Kyōkai o Yabure! Toraware no Ichigo" (Japanese: 鏡の境界を破れ！捕らわれの一護)	Hiroaki Nishimura	Hiroaki Nishimura	Masashi Sogo	June 11, 2008	October 10, 2010
175	8	"The Revenging Assassin, Ichigo is Targeted"; Transliteration: "Fukushū no Shikaku, Nerawareta Ichigo" (Japanese: 復讐の刺客、狙われた一護)	Jun'ya Koshiba	Mitsutaka Noshitani	Genki Yoshimura	June 18, 2008	October 17, 2010
176	9	"Mystery! The Sword-Consuming Assassin"; Transliteration: "Kaiki! Katana o Kuu Ansatsusha" (Japanese: 怪奇！刀を喰う暗殺者)	Tetsuhito Saitō	Taiji Kawanishi	Masahiro Ōkubo	June 25, 2008	October 24, 2010
177	10	"The Reversal of Rukia! The Rampaging Blade"; Transliteration: "Gyakuten no Rukia! Bōsōsuru Yaiba" (Japanese: 逆転のルキア、暴走する刀)	Yasuhito Nishikata	Yasuhito Nishikata	Masahiro Ōkubo Masashi Sogo	June 25, 2008	October 31, 2010
178	11	"The Nightmare Which is Shown, Ichigo's Inside the Mirror"; Transliteration: "Miserareta Akumu, Kagami no Naka no Ichigo" (Japanese: 見せられた悪夢、鏡の中の一護)	Manabu Fukazawa	Hodaka Kuramoto	Masashi Sogo	July 2, 2008	November 7, 2010
179	12	"Confrontation!? Amagai vs. Gotei 13"; Transliteration: "Tairitsu!? Amagai VS Gotei Jūsantai" (Japanese: 対立!?天貝VS護廷十三隊)	Jun'ya Koshiba	Akira Shimizu	Kento Shimoyama	July 9, 2008	November 14, 2010
180	13	"The Princess's Decision, the Sorrowful Bride"; Transliteration: "Hime no Ketsui, Kanashiki Hanayome" (Japanese: 姫の決意、哀しき花嫁)	Hiroaki Nishimura	Hiroaki Nishimura	Genki Yoshimura	July 16, 2008	November 21, 2010
181	14	"The 2nd Division Sorties! Ichigo is Surrounded"; Transliteration: "Nibantai Shutsugeki! Hōisareta Ichigo" (Japanese: 二番隊出撃！包囲された一護)	Jun'ya Koshiba	Yasuhito Nishikata	Masahiro Ōkubo	July 23, 2008	November 28, 2010
182	15	"Amagai's True Strength, the Released Zanpakuto!"; Transliteration: "Amagai no Jitsuryoku, Zanpakutō Kaihō!" (Japanese: 天貝の実力、斬魄刀解放!)	Yasuhito Nishikata Hodaka Kuramoto	Taiji Kawanishi	Genki Yoshimura	July 30, 2008	December 5, 2010
183	16	"The Darkness Which Moves! Kibune's True Colors"; Transliteration: "Ugokidashita Yami! Kibune no Shōtai" (Japanese: 動き出した闇！貴船の正体)	Manabu Fukazawa	Takeshi Tomita	Kento Shimoyama	August 6, 2008	December 12, 2010
184	17	"Kira and Kibune, Offense and Defense of the 3rd Division"; Transliteration: "Kira to Kibune, Sanbantai no Kōbō" (Japanese: 吉良と貴船、三番隊の攻防)	Jun'ya Koshiba	Tomoko Hiramuki	Masahiro Ōkubo	August 20, 2008	December 19, 2010
185	18	"Ice and Flame! Fierce Fight of Amagai vs. Hitsugaya"; Transliteration: "Kōri to Honō! Amagai VS Hitsugaya no Gekitō" (Japanese: 氷と炎！天貝VS日番谷の激闘)	Hodaka Kuramoto	Hodaka Kuramoto	Masashi Sogo	August 27, 2008	January 2, 2011
186	19	"Sortie Orders! Suppress the House of Kasumiōji"; Transliteration: "Shutsugeki Shirei! Kasumiōji-ka o Seiatsu seyo" (Japanese: 出撃指令！霞大路家を制圧せよ)	Yasuhito Nishikata	Harume Kosaka	Genki Yoshimura	September 3, 2008	January 9, 2011
187	20	"Ichigo Rages! The Assassin's Secret"; Transliteration: "Ichigo Gekido! Ansatsusha no Himitsu" (Japanese: 一護激怒！暗殺者の秘密)	Hiroaki Nishimura	Hiroaki Nishimura	Masashi Sogo	September 10, 2008	January 16, 2011
188	21	"Duel! Amagai vs. Ichigo"; Transliteration: "Kettō! Amagai VS Ichigo" (Japanese: 決闘！天貝VS一護)	Jun'ya Koshiba	Yasuhito Nishikata	Kento Shimoyama	September 17, 2008	January 23, 2011
189	22	"The Fallen Shinigami's Pride"; Transliteration: "Ochita Shinigami no Hokori" (Japanese: 堕ちた死神の誇り)	Hodaka Kuramoto Yasuhito Nishikata	Hodaka Kuramoto	Masahiro Ōkubo	October 7, 2008	January 30, 2011

==== Season 10: The Arrancar Part 4: Arrancar vs. Soul Reaper (2008–2009) ====
No. overall	No. in season	Title	Storyboarded by	Directed by	Written by	Original release date	English air date
190	1	"Hueco Mundo Chapter, Restart!"; Transliteration: "Weko Mundo Hen, Saikai!" (Japanese: ウェコムンド編、再会！)	Hiroki Takagi	Hatsuji Kawanishi	Masashi Sogo	October 14, 2008	February 6, 2011
191	2	"The Frightening Banquet, Szayelaporro Theater"; Transliteration: "Kyōen, Zaeruaporo Gekijō" (Japanese: 恐宴、ザエルアポロ劇場)	Masami Anno	Mitsutaka Totani	Masahiro Ōkubo	October 21, 2008	February 13, 2011
192	3	"Nel's Secret, A Busty Beauty Joins the Battle!?"; Transliteration: "Neru no Himitsu, Kyonyū Bijo Sansen!?" (Japanese: ネルの秘密、 巨乳美女参戦!?)	Kiyomu Fukuda	Rokou Ogiwara	Kento Shimoyama	October 28, 2008	February 20, 2011
193	4	"Irresistible, Puppet Show of Terror"; Transliteration: "Teikō Funō, Kyōfu no Ningyōgeki" (Japanese: 抵抗不能、恐怖の人形劇)	Hiroaki Nishimura	Rokou Ogiwara	Genki Yoshimura	November 4, 2008	February 27, 2011
194	5	"Neliel's Past"; Transliteration: "Nerieru no Kako" (Japanese: ネリエルの過去)	Hotaka Kumoto	Eiko Nishi	Michiko Yokote	November 11, 2008	March 6, 2011
195	6	"The Ultimate Union! Pesche's Seriousness"; Transliteration: "Kyūkyoku Gattai! Pesshe no Honki" (Japanese: 究極合体！ペッシェの本気)	Yasuhiro Matsumura	Yasuhiro Matsumura	Rika Nakase	November 18, 2008	March 13, 2011
196	7	"Joining the Battle! The Strongest Shinigami Army Appears"; Transliteration: "Sanzen! Saikyō Shinigami Gundan Tōjō" (Japanese: 参戦！最強死神軍団登場)	Shigenori Kageyama	Fukuda Akira	Kento Shimoyama	November 25, 2008	March 20, 2011
197	8	"Byakuya's Bankai, The Quiet Anger"; Transliteration: "Byakuya Bankai, Shizukanaru Ikari" (Japanese: 白哉卍解、静かなる怒り)	Masami Anno	Taiji Kawanishi	Masahiro Ōkubo	December 2, 2008	March 27, 2011
198	9	"The Two Scientists, Mayuri's Trap"; Transliteration: "Futari no Kagakusha, Mayuri no Wana" (Japanese: 2人の科学者、マユリの罠)	Yasuhito Nishikata	Mitsutaka Totani	Genki Yoshimura	December 9, 2008	April 3, 2011
199	10	"Holy Birth, The Resurrected Szayelaporro"; Transliteration: "Seitan, Yomigaeru Zaeruaporo" (Japanese: 聖誕、蘇るザエルアポロ)	Hotaka Kumoto	Rokou Ogiwara	Masashi Sogo	December 16, 2008	April 10, 2011
200	11	"The Hardest Body!? Cut Down Nnoitra"; Transliteration: "Saikō no Karada!? Noitora o Kire" (Japanese: 最硬の体!? ノイトラを斬れ)	Hiroaki Nishimura	Hiroaki Nishimura	Michiko Yokote	December 23, 2008	April 17, 2011
201	12	"Nnoitra Released! Multiplying Arms"; Transliteration: "Noitora Kaihō! Zōshokushita Ude" (Japanese: ノイトラ開放！増殖した腕)	Hitoyuki Matsui	Eiko Nishi	Rika Nakase	January 6, 2009	April 24, 2011
202	13	"Fierce Fighting Conclusion! Who's the Strongest?"; Transliteration: "Gekitō Ketchaku! Saikyō wa Dare da" (Japanese: 激闘決着！最強は誰だ)	Yasuhiro Matsumura Yasuhito Nishikata	Yasuhiro Matsumura	Rika Nakase	January 13, 2009	May 1, 2011
203	14	"Karakura Town Gathers! Aizen Versus Shinigami"; Transliteration: "Karakura-chō ni Shūketsu! Aizen Tai Shinigami" (Japanese: 空座町に集結！藍染対死神)	Masami Anno	Akane Inoue	Genki Yoshimura	January 20, 2009	May 8, 2011
204	15	"Ichigo's Seppuku Persuasion Strategy ☆"; Transliteration: "Ichigo no Seppuku Settoku Sakusen" (Japanese: 一護の切腹説得大作戦☆)	Junya Koshiba	Taiji Kawanishi	Kento Shimoyama	January 27, 2009	May 15, 2011
205	16	"Thump! A Kemari Tournament Filled with Hollows"; Transliteration: "Doki! Horō Darake no Kemari Taikai" (Japanese: ドキ！虚だらけの蹴鞠大会)	Hotaka Kumoto	Mitsutaka Totani	Masahiro Ōkubo	February 3, 2009	May 22, 2011

==== Season 11: Turn Back the Pendulum (2009) ====
No. overall	No. in season	Title	Storyboarded by	Directed by	Written by	Original release date	English air date
206	1	"The Past Chapter Begins! The Truth from 110 Years Ago"; Transliteration: "Kako Hen Kaishi! Hyakujū Nen Mae no Shinjitsu" (Japanese: 過去編開始！110年前の真実)	Masami Anno	Rokou Ogiwara	Michiko Yokote	February 10, 2009	May 29, 2011
207	2	"12th Division's New Captain, Kisuke Urahara"; Transliteration: "Jūnibantai Shin Taichō, Urahara Kisuke" (Japanese: 十二番隊新隊長、浦原喜助)	Shigeyuki Miya	Yasuhito Nishikata	Masashi Sogo	February 17, 2009	June 5, 2011
208	3	"Aizen and the Genius Boy"; Transliteration: "Aizen to Tensai Shōnen" (Japanese: 藍染と天才少年)	Hideyo Yamamoto	Tomoko Hiramu	Rika Nakase	February 24, 2009	June 12, 2011
209	4	"Muguruma 9th Division, Moves Out"; Transliteration: "Muguruma Kyūbantai, Shutsudōse Yo" (Japanese: 六車九番隊、出動せよ)	Hitoyuki Matsui	Eiko Nishi	Genki Yoshimura	March 3, 2009	June 19, 2011
210	5	"Hiyori Dies? The Beginning of Tragedy"; Transliteration: "Hiyori Shisu? Higeki no Hajimari" (Japanese: ひよ里死す? 悲劇の始まり)	Hiroaki Nishimura	Hiroaki Nishimura	Masahiro Ōkubo	March 10, 2009	June 26, 2011
211	6	"Betrayal! Aizen's Secret Maneuvers"; Transliteration: "Uragiri! An'yaku no Aizen" (Japanese: 裏切り！暗躍の藍染)	Shigeyuki Miya	Mitsue Yamazaki	Kento Shimoyama	March 17, 2009	July 3, 2011
212	7	"Rescue Hirako! Aizen vs. Urahara"; Transliteration: "Hirako o Sukue! Aizen VS Urahara" (Japanese: 平子を救え！藍染VS浦原)	Hideyo Yamamoto	Ōkura Shirakawa	Masashi Sogo	March 24, 2009	July 10, 2011

==== Season 12: The Arrancar Part 5: Battle in Karakura (2009) ====
No. overall	No. in season	Title	Storyboarded by	Directed by	Written by	Original release date	English air date
213	1	"The Konso Cop Karakuraizer is Born"; Transliteration: "Konsō Deka Karakuraizā Tanjō" (Japanese: 魂葬刑事カラクライザー誕生)	Hodaka Kuramoto	Hodaka Kuramoto	Masahiro Ōkubo	March 31, 2009	July 17, 2011
214	2	"Karakuraizer's Last Day"; Transliteration: "Karakuraizā Saigo no Hi" (Japanese: カラクライザー最後の日)	Yasuhiro Matsumura	Junya Koshiba	Masahiro Ōkubo	April 7, 2009	July 24, 2011
215	3	"Defend Karakura Town! Entire Appearance of the Shinigami"; Transliteration: "Karakura-chō o Mamore! Shinigami Sōtōjō" (Japanese: 空座町を護れ！死神総登場)	Hiroki Takagi	Mitsutaka Noshitani	Kento Shimoyama	April 14, 2009	July 31, 2011
216	4	"Elite! The Four Shinigami"; Transliteration: "Seiei! Yonnin no Shinigami" (Japanese: 精鋭！四人の死神)	Hideyo Yamamoto	Junya Koshiba	Genki Yoshimura	April 21, 2009	August 7, 2011
217	5	"Beautiful Little Devil Charlotte"; Transliteration: "Utsukushiki Koakuma Sharurotte" (Japanese: 美しき小悪魔シャルロッテ)	Hiroaki Nishimura	Taiji Kawanishi	Kento Shimoyama	April 28, 2009	August 14, 2011
218	6	"Kira, The Battle Within Despair"; Transliteration: "Kira, Zetsubō no Naka de no Tatakai" (Japanese: 吉良、絶望の中での戦い)	Hodaka Kuramoto	Rokou Ogiwara	Masahiro Ōkubo	May 5, 2009	August 21, 2011
219	7	"Hisagi's Shikai! The Name is..." Transliteration: "Hisagi Shikai! Sono na wa..." (Japanese: 檜佐木始解！その名は…)	Kazunori Mizuno	Kazunori Mizuno	Genki Yoshimura	May 12, 2009	August 28, 2011
220	8	"Ikkaku Falls! The Shinigami's Crisis"; Transliteration: "Ikkaku Taoreru! Shinigami no Kiki" (Japanese: 一角倒れる！死神の危機)	Yasuhito Nishikata	Yasuhito Nishikata	Kento Shimoyama	May 19, 2009	September 4, 2011
221	9	"The Full Showdown! Shinigami vs. Espada"; Transliteration: "Zenmen Taiketsu! Shinigami VS Esupāda" (Japanese: 全面対決！死神VS十刃)	Hiroaki Nishimura	Hiroaki Nishimura	Masahiro Ōkubo	May 26, 2009	September 11, 2011
222	10	"The Most Evil Tag!? Suì-Fēng & Ōmaeda"; Transliteration: "Saikyō Taggu!? Soifon & Ōmaeda" (Japanese: 最凶タッグ!?砕蜂&大前田)	Hodaka Kuramoto	Hodaka Kuramoto	Kento Shimoyama	June 2, 2009	September 18, 2011
223	11	"A Miraculous Body! Ggio Releases"; Transliteration: "Kyōi no Nikutai! Jio Kaihō" (Japanese: 驚異の肉体！ジオ解放)	Junya Koshiba	Takeshi Yamaguchi	Kento Shimoyama	June 9, 2009	September 25, 2011
224	12	"3 vs. 1 Battle! Rangiku's Crisis"; Transliteration: "3 vs 1 no Sentō! Pinchi no Rangiku" (Japanese: 3vs1の戦闘！ピンチの乱菊)	Hodaka Kuramoto	Tomoko Hiramukai	Kento Shimoyama	June 16, 2009	October 2, 2011
225	13	"Vice-Captains Annihilated! The Terrifying Demonic Beast"; Transliteration: "Fukutaichō Zenmetsu! Kyōfu no Yōjū" (Japanese: 副隊長全滅！恐怖の妖獣)	Hiroaki Nishimura	Taiji Kawanishi	Kento Shimoyama	June 23, 2009	October 9, 2011
226	14	"Fierce Fighting Concludes? Towards a New Battle!"; Transliteration: "Gekitō Shūketsu? Aratanaru Tatakai e!" (Japanese: 激闘終結？新たなる戦いへ！)	Kazunori Mizuno	Kazunori Mizuno	Masahiro Ōkubo	June 30, 2009	October 16, 2011
227	15	"Wonderful Error"; Transliteration: "Wandafuru Erā" (Japanese: ワンダフル・エラー)	Hiroki Takagi	Rokou Ogiwara	Genki Yoshimura	July 7, 2009	October 23, 2011
228	16	"Summer! Sea! Swimsuit Festival!!"; Transliteration: "Natsu da! Umi da! Mizugisai!!" (Japanese: 夏だ！海だ！水着祭!!)	Junya Koshiba	Mitsutaka Noshitani	Masahiro Ōkubo	July 14, 2009	October 30, 2011
229	17	"Cry of the Soul? The Rug Shinigami is Born!"; Transliteration: "Tamashii no Sakebi? Zura Shinigami Tanjō!" (Japanese: 魂の叫び？ヅラ死神誕生！)	Hiroaki Nishimura	Hiroaki Nishimura	Kento Shimoyama	July 21, 2009	November 6, 2011

==== Season 13: Zanpakutō: The Alternate Tale (2009–2010) ====
No. overall	No. in season	Title	Directed by	Written by	Storyboarded by	Original release date	English air date
230	1	"A New Enemy! The Materialization of Zanpakutō"; Transliteration: "Aratanaru Teki! Zanpakutō Jittaika" (Japanese: 新たなる敵！斬魄刀実体化)	Noriyuki Abe	Masahiro Okubo	Noriyuki Abe	July 28, 2009	November 13, 2011
231	2	"Byakuya, Disappearing with the Cherry Blossoms"; Transliteration: "Byakuya, Sakura to Tomo ni Kiyu" (Japanese: 白哉、桜と共に消ゆ)	Takeshi Yamaguchi	Masahiro Okubo	Hideki Tachibana	August 4, 2009	November 20, 2011
232	3	"Sode no Shirayuki vs. Rukia! Confused Heart"; Transliteration: "Sode no Shirayuki tai Rukia! Kokoro no Madoi" (Japanese: 袖白雪vsルキア！心の惑い)	Eiko Nishi	Genki Yoshimura	Tetsuhito Saito	August 11, 2009	November 27, 2011
233	4	"Zangetsu Becomes an Enemy"; Transliteration: "Teki to Natta Zangetsu" (Japanese: 敵となった斬月)	Junya Koshiba	Masahiro Okubo	Junya Koshiba	August 18, 2009	December 4, 2011
234	5	"Renji Surprised?! The Two Zabimarus"; Transliteration: "Renji Kyōgaku!? Futari no Zabimaru" (Japanese: 恋次驚愕!? 2人の蛇尾丸)	Rokō Ogiwara	Kento Shimoyama	Hiroki Takagi	August 25, 2009	December 11, 2011
235	6	"Clash! Hisagi vs. Kazeshini"; Transliteration: "Gekitotsu! Hisagi tai Kazeshini" (Japanese: 激突！檜佐木vs風死)	Hodaka Kuramoto	Kento Shimoyama	Hodaka Kuramoto	September 1, 2009	December 18, 2011
236	7	"Release! The New Getsuga Tenshō"; Transliteration: "Hanate! Aratanaru Getsuga Tenshō" (Japanese: 放て！新たなる月牙天衝)	Kazunori Mizuno	Kento Shimoyama	Hideki Tachibana	September 8, 2009	January 8, 2012
237	8	"Suì-Fēng, Surrounding the Zanpakutō!"; Transliteration: "Soi-Fon, Zanpakutō o Hōi se yo!" (Japanese: 砕蜂、斬魄刀を包囲せよ！)	Hiroaki Nishimura	Masahiro Okubo	Hiroaki Nishimura	September 15, 2009	January 15, 2012
238	9	"Friendship? Hatred? Haineko & Tobiume"; Transliteration: "Yūjō? Ken'o? Haineko to Tobiume" (Japanese: 友情？嫌悪？灰猫&飛梅)	Yasuhiro Matsumura	Genki Yoshimura	Hodaka Kuramoto	September 22, 2009	January 22, 2012
239	10	"The Awakening Hyōrinmaru! Hitsugaya's Fierce Fight"; Transliteration: "Mezame yo Hyōrinmaru! Hitsugaya Gekitō" (Japanese: 目覚めよ氷輪丸！日番谷激闘)	Tomoko Hiramuki	Genki Yoshimura	Tetsuhito Saito	September 29, 2009	January 29, 2012
240	11	"Byakuya's Betrayal"; Transliteration: "Uragiri no Byakuya" (Japanese: 裏切りの白哉)	Eiko Nishi	Kento Shimoyama	Hodaka Kuramoto	October 6, 2009	February 12, 2012
241	12	"For the Sake of Pride! Byakuya vs. Renji"; Transliteration: "Hokori no Tame ni! Byakuya tai Renji" (Japanese: 誇りのために！白哉vs恋次)	Yasuto Nishikata	Masahiro Okubo	Yasuto Nishikata	October 13, 2009	February 19, 2012
242	13	"Shinigami and Zanpakutō, Total Sortie"; Transliteration: "Shinigami to Zanpakutō, Sōshutsugeki" (Japanese: 死神&斬魄刀、総出撃)	Rokō Ogiwara	Masahiro Okubo	Junya Koshiba	October 20, 2009	February 26, 2012
243	14	"One-to-One Fight! Ichigo vs. Senbonzakura"; Transliteration: "Ikkiuchi! Ichigo tai Senbonzakura" (Japanese: 一騎打ち！一護vs千本桜)	Kazunori Mizuno	Masahiro Okubo	Kazunori Mizuno	October 27, 2009	March 4, 2012
244	15	"The Long Awaited...Kenpachi Appears!"; Transliteration: "Man o Moshite...Kenpachi Tōjō!" (Japanese: 満を持して…剣八登場！)	Hodaka Kuramoto	Kento Shimoyama	Hodaka Kuramoto	November 3, 2009	March 11, 2012
245	16	"Pursue Byakuya! The Confused Gotei Divisions"; Transliteration: "Byakuya o Oe! Konran no Goteitai" (Japanese: 白哉を追え！混乱の護廷隊)	Hiroaki Nishimura	Masahiro Okubo	Hiroaki Nishimura	November 10, 2009	March 18, 2012
246	17	"Special Mission! Rescue Captain Commander Yamamoto!"; Transliteration: "Tokumu! Yamamoto Sōtaichō o Kyūshutsu se yo!" (Japanese: 特務！山本総隊長を救出せよ！)	Yasuhiro Matsumura	Genki Yoshimura	Hiroki Takagi	November 17, 2009	March 25, 2012
247	18	"Deceived Shinigami! The World Collapse Crisis"; Transliteration: "Damasareta Shinigami! Sekai Hōkai no Kiki" (Japanese: 騙された死神！世界崩壊の危機)	Yuzuru Mitsui	Kento Shimoyama	Yuzuru Mitsui	November 24, 2009	April 1, 2012
248	19	"Dragon of Ice and Dragon of Flame! The Strongest Showdown!"; Transliteration: "Kōri no Ryū to Honoo no Ryū! Saikyō Taiketsu!" (Japanese: 氷の龍と炎の龍！最強対決！)	Eiko Nishi	Masahiro Okubo	Yasuto Nishikata	December 1, 2009	April 8, 2012
249	20	"Senbonzakura's Bankai! Offense and Defense of the Living World"; Transliteration: "Senbonzakura Bankai! Gensei no Kōbō" (Japanese: 千本桜卍解！現世の攻防)	Junya Koshiba	Masahiro Okubo	Junya Koshiba	December 8, 2009	April 15, 2012
250	21	"That Man, for the Sake of the Kuchiki..."; Transliteration: "Sono Otoko・Kuchiki-ke Yue ni..." (Japanese: その男・朽木家ゆえに…)	Rokō Ogiwara	Kento Shimoyama	Tetsuhito Saito	December 15, 2009	April 22, 2012
251	22	"Dark History! The Worst Shinigami Is Born"; Transliteration: "Yami no Rekishi! Saikyō no Shinigami, Tanjō" (Japanese: 闇の歴史！最凶の死神、誕生)	Hodaka Kuramoto	Genki Yoshimura	Hodaka Kuramoto	December 22, 2009	April 29, 2012
252	23	"Byakuya, the Truth Behind His Betrayal"; Transliteration: "Byakuya, Uragiri ni Kakusareta Shinjitsu" (Japanese: 白哉、裏切りに隠された真実)	Yasuto Nishikata	Masahiro Okubo	Yasuto Nishikata	January 5, 2010	May 6, 2012
253	24	"Cero?! Muramasa's True Identity Revealed"; Transliteration: "Sero!? Akasareta Muramasa no Shōtai" (Japanese: 虚閃(セロ)!? 明かされた村正の正体)	Hiroaki Nishimura	Masahiro Okubo	Hiroaki Nishimura	January 12, 2010	May 13, 2012
254	25	"Byakuya and Renji, the 6th Division Returns!"; Transliteration: "Byakuya to Renji, Rokubantai Futatabi!" (Japanese: 白哉と恋次、六番隊再び！)	Takeshi Yamaguchi	Kento Shimoyama	Junya Koshiba	January 19, 2010	May 20, 2012
255	26	"Final Chapter - Zanpakutō the Alternate Tale"; Transliteration: "Shūshō・Zanpakutō Ibun-hen" (Japanese: 終章・斬魄刀異聞編)	Kazunori Mizuno	Genki Yoshimura	Noriyuki Abe	January 26, 2010	May 27, 2012
256	27	"The Angered Byakuya! The Collapse of the Kuchiki House!"; Transliteration: "Ikari no Byakuya! Kuchiki-ke Hōkai!" (Japanese: 怒りの白哉！朽木家崩壊！)	Mitsutaka Noshitani	Masahiro Okubo	Kazunori Mizuno	February 2, 2010	June 3, 2012
257	28	"A New Enemy! The True Nature of the Sword Beasts"; Transliteration: "Aratana Teki! Tōjū no Shōtai" (Japanese: 新たな敵！刀獣の正体)	Junya Koshiba	Genki Yoshimura	Yasuyuki Honda	February 9, 2010	June 10, 2012
258	29	"Stray Snake, Tortured Monkey"; Transliteration: "Maigo no Hebi, Junan no Saru" (Japanese: 迷子の蛇、受難の猿)	Rokō Ogiwara	Kento Shimoyama	Hodaka Kuramoto	February 16, 2010	June 17, 2012
259	30	"Terror! The Monster That Lurks Underground"; Transliteration: "Kyōfu! Chika ni Hisomu Kaibutsu" (Japanese: 恐怖！地下に潜む怪物)	Hodaka Kuramoto	Masahiro Okubo	Hiroki Takagi	February 23, 2010	June 24, 2012
260	31	"Conclusion?! Hisagi vs. Kazeshini"; Transliteration: "Ketchaku!? Hisagi tai Kazeshini" (Japanese: 決着!? 檜佐木vs風死)	Mitsue Yamazaki	Kento Shimoyama	Shigeru Ueda	March 2, 2010	July 1, 2012
261	32	"The Person with the Unknown Ability! Orihime Is Targeted"; Transliteration: "Michinaru Nōryokusha! Nerawareta Orihime" (Japanese: 未知なる能力者！狙われた織姫)	Hiroaki Nishimura	Genki Yoshimura	Tetsuhito Saito	March 9, 2010	July 8, 2012
262	33	"Haineko Cries! The Tragic Sword Beast!"; Transliteration: "Higeki no Tōjū! Haineko, Gōkyū!" (Japanese: 悲劇の刀獣！灰猫、号泣！)	Kazunobu Shimizu	Kento Shimoyama	Masahiko Komino	March 16, 2010	July 15, 2012
263	34	"Imprisonment?! Senbonzakura & Zabimaru"; Transliteration: "Yūhei!? Senbonzakura to Zabimaru" (Japanese: 幽閉!? 千本桜&蛇尾丸)	Yasuto Nishikata	Masahiro Okubo	Yasuto Nishikata	March 23, 2010	July 22, 2012
264	35	"Battle of the Females? Katen Kyōkotsu vs. Nanao!"; Transliteration: "Onna no Tatakai? Katen Kyōkotsu tai Nanao!" (Japanese: 女の戦い？花天狂骨vs七緒！)	Mitsutaka Noshitani	Kento Shimoyama	Hodaka Kuramoto	March 30, 2010	July 29, 2012
265	36	"Evolution?! The Menace of the Final Sword Beast!"; Transliteration: "Shinka!? Saigo no Tōjū no Kyōi!" (Japanese: 進化!? 最後の刀獣の脅威！)	Junya Koshiba	Masahiro Okubo	Junya Koshiba	April 6, 2010	August 5, 2012

==== Season 14: The Arrancar Part 6: Fall of the Espada (2010–2011) ====
No. overall	No. in season	Title	Directed by	Written by	Storyboarded by	Original release date	English air date
266	1	"Ichigo vs. Ulquiorra, Resume!"; Transliteration: "Ichigo tai Urukiora, Saikai!" (Japanese: 一護vsウルキオラ、再開！)	Noriyuki Abe (Note: The entirety of episode 266 is a recap using footage from previous episodes and only credits Noriyuki Abe as director)	N/A	N/A	April 13, 2010	August 12, 2012
267	2	"Connected Hearts! The Left Fist of Certain Death!"; Transliteration: "Tsunagaru Kokoro! Kesshi no Saken!" (Japanese: 繋がる心！決死の左拳！)	Rokō Ogiwara	Kento Shimoyama	Tetsuhito Saito	April 20, 2010	August 19, 2012
268	3	"Jealousy and Hatred...Orihime's Dilemma!"; Transliteration: "Shitto to Zōo...Kyūchi no Orihime!" (Japanese: 嫉妬と憎悪…窮地の織姫！)	Yasuto Nishikata	Kento Shimoyama	Yasuto Nishikata	April 27, 2010	August 26, 2012
269	4	"Ichigo and Uryū, Bonded Back to Back!"; Transliteration: "Ichigo to Uryū, Senakaawase no Kizuna!" (Japanese: 一護と雨竜、背中合わせの絆！)	Mitsue Yamazaki	Kento Shimoyama	Hideyo Yamamoto	May 4, 2010	September 2, 2012
270	5	"Beginning of Despair...Ichigo, the Unreachable Blade"; Transliteration: "Zetsubō no Hajimari...Ichigo, Todokanu Yaiba" (Japanese: 絶望の始まり…一護、届かぬ刃)	Yoshifumi Sueda	Masahiro Okubo	Ogura Shirakawa	May 11, 2010	September 9, 2012
271	6	"Ichigo Dies! Orihime, the Cry of Sorrow!"; Transliteration: "Ichigo Shisu! Orihime, Hitsū no Sakebi!" (Japanese: 一護死す！織姫、悲痛の叫び！)	Yasuto Nishikata	Masahiro Okubo	Yuzuru Tachikawa	May 18, 2010	September 16, 2012
272	7	"Ichigo vs. Ulquiorra, Conclusion!"; Transliteration: "Ichigo tai Urukiora, Kecchaku!" (Japanese: 一護vsウルキオラ、決着！)	Kazunobu Shimizu	Kento Shimoyama	Hiroki Takagi	May 25, 2010	September 23, 2012
273	8	"Fury of the Shark! Halibel's Release"; Transliteration: "Same no Mōi! Hariberu Kaihō" (Japanese: 鮫の猛威！ハリベル解放)	Tetsuo Ichimura	Masahiro Okubo	Shigeru Ueda	June 1, 2010	September 30, 2012
274	9	"Hitsugaya, the Desperate Hyōten Hyakkasō!"; Transliteration: "Hitsugaya, Sutemi no Hyōten Hyakkasō!" (Japanese: 日番谷、捨て身の氷天百華葬！)	Hodaka Kuramoto	Kento Shimoyama	Hideyo Yamamoto	June 8, 2010	October 7, 2012
275	10	"The Approaching Breath of Death...the King Who Rules Over Death!"; Transliteration: "Semaru Shi no Ibuki...Shi o Tsukasadoru Ō!" (Japanese: 迫る死の息吹…死を司る王！)	Mitsutaka Noshitani	Kento Shimoyama	Shigeru Ueda	June 15, 2010	October 14, 2012
276	11	"One Hit Kill! Suì-Fēng, Bankai!"; Transliteration: "Ichigeki Kessatsu! Soi-Fon, Bankai!" (Japanese: 一撃決殺！砕蜂、卍解！)	Rokō Ogiwara	Kento Shimoyama	Masahiko Komino	June 22, 2010	October 21, 2012
277	12	"Climax! Kyōraku vs. Stark!"; Transliteration: "Hakunetsu! Kyōraku tai Sutāku!" (Japanese: 白熱！京楽vsスターク！)	Junya Koshiba	Masahiro Okubo	Junya Koshiba	June 29, 2010	October 28, 2012
278	13	"The Nightmare Returns...Revival of the Espada"; Transliteration: "Akumu Futatabi...Fukkatsu no Esupāda" (Japanese: 悪夢再び…復活の十刃)	Akane Inoue	Masahiro Okubo	Hideyo Yamamoto	July 6, 2010	November 4, 2012
279	14	"Hirako and Aizen...the Reunion of Fate!"; Transliteration: "Hirako to Aizen...Innen no Saikai!" (Japanese: 平子と藍染…因縁の再会！)	Yasuto Nishikata	Masahiro Okubo	Masahiko Komino	July 13, 2010	November 11, 2012
280	15	"Hisagi and Tōsen...the Moment of Parting!"; Transliteration: "Hisagi to Tōsen...Ketsubetsu no Toki!" (Japanese: 檜佐木と東仙…訣別の時！)	Hiroaki Nishimura	Kazuyuki Fudeyasu	Hideyo Yamamoto	July 20, 2010	November 18, 2012
281	16	"Crown of Lies...Baraggan's Grudge!"; Transliteration: "Itsuwari no Ōkan...Baragan no Enkon!" (Japanese: 偽りの王冠…バラガンの怨恨！)	Kazunobu Shimizu	Kazuyuki Fudeyasu	Junya Koshiba	July 27, 2010	November 25, 2012
282	17	"Power of the Soul! Los Lobos, Attack!"; Transliteration: "Tamashii no Chikara! Rosu Robosu, Shūrai!" (Japanese: 魂の力！群狼、襲来！)	Junya Koshiba	Kento Shimoyama	Junya Koshiba	August 3, 2010	January 27, 2013
283	18	"Stark, the Lone Battle"; Transliteration: "Sutāku, Tatta Hitori no Tatakai" (Japanese: スターク、たった独りの戦い)	Kazuma Satō	Kento Shimoyama	Shigeru Ueda	August 10, 2010	February 3, 2013
284	19	"Chain of Sacrifice...Halibel's Past"; Transliteration: "Gisei no Rensa...Hariberu no Kako" (Japanese: 犠牲の連鎖…ハリベルの過去)	Kazuo Nogami	Kento Shimoyama	Tetsuhito Saito	August 17, 2010	February 10, 2013
285	20	"The Hundred-Year Grudge...Hiyori's Revenge!"; Transliteration: "Hyakunen no Enkon...Hiyori no Fukushū!" (Japanese: 百年の怨恨…ひよ里の復讐！)	Yasuto Nishikata	Kazuyuki Fudeyasu	Yoshifumi Sueda	August 24, 2010	February 17, 2013
286	21	"Protect Karakura Town! Ichigo's Return!"; Transliteration: "Karakura-chō o Mamore! Ichigo, Gense e!" (Japanese: 空座町を護れ！一護、現世へ！)	Shigeru Ueda	Kazuyuki Fudeyasu	Hiroki Takagi	August 31, 2010	February 24, 2013
287	22	"Side Story! Ichigo and the Magic Lamp!"; Transliteration: "Gaiden! Ichigo to Mahō no Ranpu!" (Japanese: 外伝！一護と魔法のランプ！)	Junya Koshiba	Kento Shimoyama	Hiroki Takagi & Yasuto Nishikata	September 7, 2010	March 3, 2013
288	23	"The Final Trump Card! Ichigo, Towards the Decisive Battle!"; Transliteration: "Saigo no Kirifuda! Ichigo, Kessen e!" (Japanese: 最後の切り札！一護、決戦へ！)	Hiroaki Nishimura	Kazuyuki Fudeyasu	Hitoyuki Matsui	September 14, 2010	March 10, 2013
289	24	"Byakuya vs. Kenpachi?! The Melee Commences!"; Transliteration: "Byakuya tai Kenpachi!? Ransen Kaishi!" (Japanese: 白哉vs剣八!? 乱戦開始！)	Yasuto Nishikata	Kazuyuki Fudeyasu	Yasuto Nishikata	September 21, 2010	March 17, 2013
290	25	"For the Sake of Justice?! The Man Who Deserted the Shinigami"; Transliteration: "Seigi no Tame ni!? Shinigami o Suteta Otoko" (Japanese: 正義の為に!? 死神を捨てた男)	Kazunobu Shimizu	Kento Shimoyama	Hideyo Yamamoto	September 28, 2010	March 24, 2013
291	26	"Desperate Struggle with Aizen! Hirako, Shikai!"; Transliteration: "Aizen to no Shitō! Hirako, Shikai!" (Japanese: 藍染との死闘！平子、始解！)	Mitsutaka Noshitani	Kento Shimoyama	Hideyo Yamamoto	October 5, 2010	March 31, 2013
292	27	"All-Out War! Aizen vs. Shinigami!"; Transliteration: "Zenmen Sensō! Aizen tai Shinigami!" (Japanese: 全面戦争！藍染vs死神！)	Akane Inoue	Masahiro Okubo	Hitoyuki Matsui	October 12, 2010	April 7, 2013
293	28	"Hitsugaya, Enraged! Blade of Hatred!"; Transliteration: "Hitsugaya, Gekkō! Nikushimi no Yaiba!" (Japanese: 日番谷、激昂！憎しみの刃！)	Kazuo Nogami	Kento Shimoyama	Masami Shimoda	October 19, 2010	April 14, 2013
294	29	"Impossible to Attack?! The Sealed Genryūsai!"; Transliteration: "Kōgeki Funō!? Fūjirareta Genryūsai!" (Japanese: 攻撃不能!? 封じられた元柳斎！)	Mitsue Yamazaki	Kazuyuki Fudeyasu	Tetsuhito Saito	October 26, 2010	April 21, 2013
295	30	"It's All a Trap...Engineered Bonds!"; Transliteration: "Subete wa Wana...Shikumareta Kizuna!" (Japanese: 全ては罠…仕組まれた絆！)	Yasuto Nishikata	Masahiro Okubo	Yoshifumi Sueda	November 2, 2010	April 28, 2013
296	31	"The Shocking Truth...the Mysterious Power Within Ichigo!"; Transliteration: "Shōgeki no Shinjitsu...Ichigo ni Himerareta Chikara!" (Japanese: 衝撃の真実…一護に秘められた力！)	Hiroaki Nishimura	Masahiro Okubo	Hitoyuki Matsui	November 9, 2010	May 5, 2013
297	32	"The Extending Blade?! Ichigo vs. Gin!"; Transliteration: "Nobiru Yaiba!? Ichigo tai Gin!" (Japanese: 伸びる刃!? 一護vsギン！)	Kazunobu Shimizu	Masahiro Okubo	Masami Shimoda	November 16, 2010	May 12, 2013
298	33	"Film! Festival! Shinigami Film Festival!"; Transliteration: "Eiga da! Matsuri da! Shinigami Eiga Matsuri!" (Japanese: 映画だ！祭だ！死神映画祭！)	Mitsutaka Noshitani	Masahiro Okubo	Junya Koshiba	November 23, 2010	May 19, 2013
299	34	"Theatre Opening Commemoration! The Hell Verse: Prologue"; Transliteration: "Gekijō Kōkai Kinen! Jigoku-hen・Joshō" (Japanese: 劇場公開記念！地獄篇・序章)	Yasuto Nishikata	Masahiro Okubo	Yasuto Nishikata	November 30, 2010	May 26, 2013
300	35	"Urahara Appears! Stop Aizen!"; Transliteration: "Urahara Tōjō! Aizen o Soshi se yo!" (Japanese: 浦原登場！藍染を阻止せよ！)	Kazuo Nogami	Kazuyuki Fudeyasu	Shigeru Ueda	December 7, 2010	June 2, 2013
301	36	"Ichigo Loses His Fighting Spirit?! Gin's Expectation!"; Transliteration: "Ichigo, Sen'i Sōshitsu!? Gin no Omowaku!" (Japanese: 一護、戦意喪失!? ギンの思惑！)	Akane Inoue	Kento Shimoyama	Hitoyuki Matsui	December 14, 2010	June 9, 2013
302	37	"The Final Getsuga Tenshō?! Ichigo's Training!"; Transliteration: "Saigo no Getsuga Tenshō!? Ichigo no Shugyō!" (Japanese: 最後の月牙天衝!? 一護の修行！)	Junya Koshiba	Masahiro Okubo	Masami Shimoda	December 21, 2010	June 16, 2013
303	38	"Real World and Shinigami! The New Year Special!"; Transliteration: "Gense mo Shinigami mo! O-Shōgatsu Supesharu!" (Japanese: 現世も死神も！お正月スペシャル！)	Kazunobu Shimizu	Kento Shimoyama	Hideyo Yamamoto	January 4, 2011	June 23, 2013
304	39	"Another Side Story! This Time the Enemy Is a Monster?!"; Transliteration: "Gaiden Futatabi! Kondo no Teki wa Monsutā!?" (Japanese: 外伝再び！今度の敵はモンスター!?)	Rokō Ogiwara	Kazuyuki Fudeyasu	Hiroki Takagi	January 11, 2011	June 30, 2013
305	40	"Delusion Roars! Hisagi, Towards the Hot Springs Inn!"; Transliteration: "Mōsō Bakusō! Hisagi, Onsen Ryokan e!" (Japanese: 妄想爆走！檜佐木、温泉旅館へ！)	Mitsutaka Noshitani	Masahiro Okubo	Junya Koshiba	January 18, 2011	July 7, 2013
306	41	"For the Sake of Protecting! Ichigo vs. Tensa Zangetsu!"; Transliteration: "Mamoru Tame ni! Ichigo tai Tensa Zangetsu!" (Japanese: 護るために！一護vs天鎖斬月！)	Junya Koshiba	Kento Shimoyama	Masami Shimoda	January 25, 2011	July 14, 2013
307	42	"Emergency Situation! Aizen, New Evolution!"; Transliteration: "Kinkyū Jitai! Aizen, Saranaru Shinka!" (Japanese: 緊急事態！藍染、更なる進化！)	Akane Inoue	Kento Shimoyama	Hideyo Yamamoto	February 1, 2011	July 21, 2013
308	43	"Goodbye...Rangiku"; Transliteration: "Sayonara...Rangiku" (Japanese: さよなら…乱菊)	Junya Koshiba	Kento Shimoyama	Junya Koshiba	February 8, 2011	July 28, 2013
309	44	"Fierce Fighting Conclusion! Release, the Final Getsuga Tenshō!"; Transliteration: "Gekitō Ketchaku! Hanate, Saigo no Getsuga Tenshō!" (Japanese: 激闘決着！放て、最後の月牙天衝！)	Yoshifumi Sueda	Kazuyuki Fudeyasu	Yoshifumi Sueda	February 15, 2011	August 4, 2013
310	45	"Ichigo's Resolution! The Price of the Fierce Battle"; Transliteration: "Ichigo no Kakugo! Gekitō no Daishō" (Japanese: 一護の覚悟！激闘の代償)	Kazunobu Shimizu	Masahiro Okubo	Minoru Murao	February 22, 2011	August 11, 2013
311	46	"The Soul Detective: Karakuraizer Takes off Again!"; Transliteration: "Konsō Keiji・Karakuraizā Sai Hasshin!" (Japanese: 魂葬刑事・カラクライザー再発進！)	Kazuo Nogami	Mio Imamura	Hitoyuki Matsui	March 1, 2011	August 18, 2013
312	47	"Inauguration! The Brand New 2nd Division Captain!"; Transliteration: "Shūnin! Aratanaru Nibantai Taichō!" (Japanese: 就任！新たなる二番隊隊長！)	Hiroaki Nishimura	Masahiro Okubo	Hideyo Yamamoto	March 8, 2011	August 25, 2013
313	48	"The Man Who Risks His Life in the 11th Division!"; Transliteration: "Jūichibantai ni Inochi o Kaketa Otoko!" (Japanese: 十一番隊に命を賭けた男！)	Mitsutaka Noshitani	Kento Shimoyama	Shigeru Ueda	March 15, 2011	September 8, 2013
314	49	"Kon Saw It! The Secret of a Beautiful Office Lady"; Transliteration: "Kon wa Mita! Bijin Ōeru no Himitsu" (Japanese: コンは見た！美人OL(オーエル)の秘密)	Hiroki Takagi	Kazuyuki Fudeyasu	Hiroki Takagi	March 22, 2011	September 15, 2013
315	50	"Yachiru's Friend! The Shinigami of Justice Appears!"; Transliteration: "Yachiru no Tomo! Seigi no Shinigami Tōjō!" (Japanese: やちるの友！正義の死神登場！)	Akane Inoue	Kazuyuki Fudeyasu	Hideyo Yamamoto	March 29, 2011	September 22, 2013
316	51	"Toshirō Hitsugaya's Holiday!"; Transliteration: "Hitsugaya Toshirō no Kyūjitsu!" (Japanese: 日番谷冬獅郎の休日！)	Kazunobu Shimizu	Masahiro Okubo	Yuzuru Tachikawa	April 5, 2011	September 29, 2013

==== Season 15: Gotei 13 Invading Army (2011) ====
No. overall	No. in season	Title	Directed by	Written by	Animation directed by	Original release date	English air date
317	1	"Unusual Incident in Seireitei?! The Gotei 13 Invading Army Arc!"; Transliteration: "Seireitei ni Ihen! Gotei Jūsan-tai Shingun-hen!" (Japanese: 瀞霊廷に異変！護廷十三隊侵軍篇!)	Noriyuki Abe	Kento Shimoyama	Masashi Kudo	April 12, 2011	October 6, 2013
318	2	"Renji vs. Rukia?! Battle with Comrades!"; Transliteration: "Renji tai Rukia!? Nakama to no Tatakai!" (Japanese: 恋次vsルキア!? 仲間との戦い！)	Kazunori Mizuno	Kento Shimoyama	Masahiko Komino	April 19, 2011	October 13, 2013
319	3	"Ichigo's Capture Net! Escape from Soul Society!"; Transliteration: "Ichigo Hobakumō! Sōru Sosaeti o Dasshutsu se yo!" (Japanese: 一護捕縛網！尸魂界(ソウル・ソサエティ)を脱出せよ！)	Yuzuru Tachikawa	Kento Shimoyama	Shinichi Kurita	April 26, 2011	October 20, 2013
320	4	"The Gotei 13, Gathering in the Real World!"; Transliteration: "Gotei Jūsan-tai, Gense ni Shūketsu!" (Japanese: 護廷十三隊、現世に集結！)	Directed by : Kazuo Nogami; Storyboarded by : Minoru Murao	Masahiro Okubo	Yukari Takeuchi	May 3, 2011	October 27, 2013
321	5	"Ikkaku vs. Ikkaku! Showdown of Mutual Self!"; Transliteration: "Ikkaku tai Ikkaku! Jibun Dōshi no Tatakai!" (Japanese: 一角vs一角！自分同士の戦い！)	Directed by : Mitsutaka Noshitani; Storyboarded by : Masahiko Komino	Masahiro Okubo	Natsuko Suzuki	May 10, 2011	November 3, 2013
322	6	"Clash! Rukia vs. Rukia!"; Transliteration: "Gekitotsu! Rukia tai Rukia!" (Japanese: 激突！ルキアvsルキア！)	Directed by : Akane Inoue; Storyboarded by : Yasuto Nishikata & Junya Koshiba	Kazuyuki Fudeyasu	Minoru Morita	May 17, 2011	November 10, 2013
323	7	"Protect Ichigo! Nozomi's Determination"; Transliteration: "Mamore Ichigo! Nozomi no Ketsui" (Japanese: 護れ一護！望実の決意！)	Directed by : Kazunobu Shimizu; Storyboarded by : Toshihiko Masuda	Kazuyuki Fudeyasu	Manabu Kurihara	May 24, 2011	November 17, 2013
324	8	"Recapture Seireitei! The Captains Move!"; Transliteration: "Seireitei Dakkan e! Taichō-tachi, Ugoku!" (Japanese: 瀞霊廷奪還へ！隊長たち、動く！)	Directed by : Yasuto Nishikata; Storyboarded by : Atsushi Wakabayashi	Kento Shimoyama	Masaya Ōnishi	May 31, 2011	November 24, 2013
325	9	"For the Sake of the Believers! Byakuya vs. Hitsugaya!"; Transliteration: "Shinzuru Mono no Tame ni! Byakuya tai Hitsugaya!" (Japanese: 信ずるものの為に！白哉vs日番谷！)	Junya Koshiba	Kento Shimoyama	Tomomi Ishikawa	June 7, 2011	December 1, 2013
326	10	"The Two Hinamori, Hitsugaya's Resolution"; Transliteration: "Futari no Hinamori, Hitsugaya no Kakugo" (Japanese: ふたりの雛森、日番谷の覚悟)	Directed by : Kazuo Nogami; Storyboarded by : Minoru Murao	Kazuyuki Fudeyasu	Yukari Takeuchi, Mitsuki Kosaka & Yūri Ichinose	June 14, 2011	January 5, 2014
327	11	"Pride of the Kuchiki Family! Byakuya vs. Byakuya!"; Transliteration: "Kuchiki-ke no Hokori! Byakuya tai Byakuya!" (Japanese: 朽木家の誇り！白哉vs白哉！)	Minoru Yamaoka	Masahiro Okubo	Shinichi Kurita	June 21, 2011	January 12, 2014
328	12	"Defeat Kagerōza! Shinigami in All-Out War!"; Transliteration: "Kagerōza o Taose! Shinigami, Sōryokusen!" (Japanese: 影狼佐を倒せ！死神、総力戦！)	Directed by : Kazunori Mizuno; Storyboarded by : Hiroki Takagi & Yasuto Nishikata	Kento Shimoyama	Masahiko Komino	June 28, 2011	January 19, 2014
329	13	"The Forbidden Research...Nozomi's Hidden Secret!"; Transliteration: "Kindan no Kenkyū...Nozomi ni Kakusareta Himitsu!" (Japanese: 禁断の研究…望実に隠された秘密！)	Directed by : Yasuto Nishikata; Storyboarded by : Noriyuki Abe, Yasuto Nishikata & Hiroki Takagi	Kento Shimoyama	Tomomi Umemura	July 5, 2011	January 26, 2014
330	14	"I Want to Live...! Nozomi's Zanpakutō"; Transliteration: "Ikitai...! Nozomi no Zanpakutō" (Japanese: 生きたい…！望実の斬魄刀)	Directed by : Mitsutaka Noshitani; Storyboarded by : Tetsuhito Saito	Kento Shimoyama	Natsuko Suzuki & Makoto Shimojima	July 12, 2011	February 2, 2014
331	15	"For the Sake of Fighting! The Awakened Nozomi!"; Transliteration: "Tatakau Tame ni! Mezame yo Nozomi!" (Japanese: 戦うために！目覚めよ望実！)	Directed by : Akane Inoue; Storyboarded by : Junya Koshiba	Masahiro Okubo	Minoru Morita & Shuji Maruyama	July 19, 2011	February 9, 2014
332	16	"The Most Evil Reigai, Appearing in the Real World!"; Transliteration: "Saikyo no Reigai, Gense ni Arawaru!" (Japanese: 最凶の霊骸、現世に現る！)	Directed by : Kazunobu Shimizu; Storyboarded by : Hideyo Yamamoto	Masahiro Okubo	Manabu Kurihara	July 26, 2011	February 16, 2014
333	17	"Destroy Nozomi?! Genryusai's Decision!"; Transliteration: "Nozomi o Kesu!? Genryūsai no Ketsudan!" (Japanese: 望実を消す!? 元柳斎の決断！)	Directed by : Kazuo Nogami; Storyboarded by : Tetsuhito Saito	Kazuyuki Fudeyasu	Yukari Takeuchi	August 2, 2011	February 23, 2014
334	18	"The Depleting Reiatsu! Ichigo, Death Struggle of the Soul!"; Transliteration: "Ushinawareru Reiatsu! Ichigo, Tamashii no Shitō!" (Japanese: 失われる霊圧！一護、魂の死闘！)	Kazunori Mizuno	Kazuyuki Fudeyasu	Masaya Ōnishi & Tomomi Umemura	August 9, 2011	March 2, 2014
335	19	"Hiding in the Dangai? Another Ichigo?!"; Transliteration: "Dangai ni Senpuku? Mō Hitori no Ichigo!?" (Japanese: 断界に潜伏？もう一人の一護!?)	Yuzuru Tachikawa	Kento Shimoyama	Shinichi Kurita	August 16, 2011	March 9, 2014
336	20	"Pursue Kagerōza! Technological Development Department, Infiltration!"; Transliteration: "Kagerōza o Oe! Gijutsu Kaihatsukyoku, Sennyū!" (Japanese: 影狼佐を追え！技術開発局、潜入！)	Directed by : Yoshifumi Sueda; Storyboarded by : Noriyuki Abe & Yoshifumi Sueda	Kento Shimoyama	Masahiko Komino	August 23, 2011	March 16, 2014
337	21	"The Developer of the Modified Souls"; Transliteration: "Kaizō Konpaku no Kaihatsusha" (Japanese: 改造魂魄の開発者)	Directed by : Mitsutaka Noshitani; Storyboarded by : Hiroki Takagi	Kazuyuki Fudeyasu	Natsuko Suzuki & Gi Nam Kim	August 30, 2011	March 23, 2014
338	22	"Kon's Thoughts, Nozomi's Thoughts"; Transliteration: "Kon no Omoi, Nozomi no Omoi" (Japanese: コンの想い、望実の想い)	Directed by : Akane Inoue; Storyboarded by : Junya Koshiba	Kazuyuki Fudeyasu	Makoto Koga, Shuji Maruyama & Akemi Kobayashi	September 6, 2011	March 30, 2014
339	23	"Protect Ichigo! The Bonds of Friends!"; Transliteration: "Ichigo o Mamore! Nakama-tachi no Kizuna!" (Japanese: 一護を護れ！仲間たちの絆！)	Directed by : Masaya Sasaki; Storyboarded by : Tetsuhito Saito	Masahiro Okubo	Manabu Kurihara & Kenji Hattori	September 13, 2011	April 6, 2014
340	24	"Reigai vs. Original, the Fierce Battle for Gambled Pride!"; Transliteration: "Reigai tai Genshu, Hokori o Kaketa Gekitō!" (Japanese: 霊骸vs原種、誇りを賭けた激闘！)	Directed by : Kazuo Nogami; Storyboarded by : Yasuto Nishikata	Kento Shimoyama	Yukari Takeuchi, Mitsuki Kosaka & Chiaki Abe	September 20, 2011	April 13, 2014
341	25	"Invading Army Arc, Final Conclusion!"; Transliteration: "Shingun-hen, Saishū Ketchaku!" (Japanese: 侵軍篇、最終決着！)	Yuzuru Tachikawa	Kento Shimoyama	Hiroaki Imaki	September 27, 2011	April 20, 2014
342	26	"Thank You"; Transliteration: "Arigatō" (Japanese: ありがとう)	Directed by : Ogura Shirakawa; Storyboarded by : Junya Koshiba	Masahiro Okubo	Masashi Kudo	October 4, 2011	April 27, 2014

==== Season 16: The Lost Agent (2011–2012) ====
No. overall	No. in season	Title	Directed by	Written by	Animation directed by	Original release date	English air date
343	1	"3rd Year High School Student! Dressed Up, and a New Chapter Begins!"; Transliteration: "Kōkō San Nensei! Yosoi Arata ni Shinshō Kaishi!" (Japanese: 高校3年生！装い新たに新章開始！)	Directed by : Yasuto Nishikata; Storyboarded by : Yukihiro Matsushita	Masahiro Okubo	Tomomi Umemura	October 11, 2011	May 4, 2014
344	2	"A Dispute in School?! Ichigo and Uryū, Fight Together!"; Transliteration: "Gakkō Kan Kōsō!? Ichigo to Uryū, Kyōtou!" (Japanese: 学校間抗争!? 一護と雨竜、共闘！)	Directed by : Mitsutaka Noshitani; Storyboarded by : Tadahito Matsubayashi	Kazuyuki Fudeyasu	Natsuko Suzuki	October 18, 2011	May 11, 2014
345	3	"Uryū Is Attacked, a Threat Draws Near Friends!"; Transliteration: "Osowa-reta Uryū, Nakama-tachi ni Semaru Kyōi!" (Japanese: 襲われた雨竜、仲間達に迫る脅威！)	Directed by : Junya Koshiba; Storyboarded by : Tetsuhito Saito	Kento Shimoyama	Masaya Ōnishi	October 25, 2011	May 18, 2014
346	4	"The Man with the Fullbring Ability: Kūgo Ginjō"; Transliteration: "Furuburingu no Nōryokusha: Ginjō Kūgo" (Japanese: 完現術(フルブリング)の能力者・銀城空吾)	Directed by : Tadahito Matsubayashi; Storyboarded by : Takahiro Takamizawa	Masahiro Okubo	Sanae Shimada	November 1, 2011	June 1, 2014
347	5	"A Crisis Sneaking Up on the Kurosaki Family?! Ichigo's Confusion!"; Transliteration: "Kurosaki-ka ni Shinobiyoru Kiki!? Ichigo no Mayoi!" (Japanese: 黒崎家に忍び寄る危機!? 一護の迷い！)	Directed by : Mitsutaka Noshitani; Storyboarded by : Noriyuki Abe	Kento Shimoyama	Yukari Takeuchi	November 8, 2011	June 8, 2014
348	6	"Power of the Substitute Badge, Ichigo's "Pride"!"; Transliteration: "Daikōshō no Chikara, Ichigo no "Hokori"!" (Japanese: 代行証の力、一護の"誇り"！)	Directed by : Kazunori Mizuno (Note: Credited as Kumi Hitokuchi); Storyboarded by : Junya Koshiba	Kazuyuki Fudeyasu	Yoko Suzuki	November 15, 2011	June 15, 2014
349	7	"Next Target, the Devil's Hand Aims at Orihime!"; Transliteration: "Tsugi no Hyōteki, Orihime o Osou Ma no Te!" (Japanese: 次の標的、織姫を襲う魔の手！)	Directed by : Geisei Morita; Storyboarded by : Takehiro Nakayama	Mio Imamura	Shuji Maruyama & Makoto Koga	November 22, 2011	June 22, 2014
350	8	"The Man Who Killed the Shinigami Substitute?! Tsukishima Makes His Move"; Transliteration: "Shinigami Daikō o Koroshita Otoko!? Ugokidasu Tsukishima" (Japanese: 死神代行を殺した男!? 動き出す月島)	Directed by : Yasuto Nishikata; Storyboarded by : Yukihiro Matsushita	Masahiro Okubo	Tomomi Umemura	November 29, 2011	June 29, 2014
351	9	"Fullbring, the Detested Power!"; Transliteration: "Furuburingu, Imikirawa-reta Chikara!" (Japanese: フルブリング、忌み嫌われた力！)	Kazunori Mizuno	Kento Shimoyama	Makoto Shimojima & Akio Kawamura	December 6, 2011	July 13, 2014
352	10	"Tsukishima Attacks! The Training Has Been Thwarted!"; Transliteration: "Tsukishima, Kyūshū! Bōgaisa-reta Shūgyō!" (Japanese: 月島、急襲！妨害された修業！)	Directed by : Yasuhiro Kuroda; Storyboarded by : Tetsuhito Saito	Kazuyuki Fudeyasu	Natsuko Suzuki, Gi Nam Kim & Shigemi Aoyagi	December 13, 2011	July 20, 2014
353	11	"Onwards to Battle! Ichigo, Mastering the Fullbring!"; Transliteration: "Gekitō e! Ichigo, Furuburingu o Tsukaikonase!" (Japanese: 激闘へ！一護、完現術(フルブリング)を使いこなせ！)	Junya Koshiba	Masahiro Okubo	Masaya Ōnishi	December 20, 2011	July 27, 2014
354	12	"Ichigo vs. Ginjō! To the Game's Space!"; Transliteration: "Ichigo tai Ginjō, Gēmu no Kūkan e!" (Japanese: 一護vs銀城、ゲームの空間へ！)	Directed by : Mitsutaka Noshitani; Storyboarded by : Yasuto Nishikata	Kazuyuki Fudeyasu	Yukari Takeuchi	December 27, 2011	August 3, 2014
355	13	"Shinigami at War! New Year in Seireitei Special!"; Transliteration: "Shinigami Sansen! Seireitei mo Oshōgatsu Supesharu!" (Japanese: 死神参戦！瀞霊廷もお正月SP(スペシャル)！)	Hiroki Takagi	Mio Imamura	Yoko Suzuki	January 10, 2012	August 10, 2014
356	14	"Friend or Foe?! Ginjō's True Intentions!"; Transliteration: "Teki ka Mikata ka!? Ginjō no Mienai Kokoro!" (Japanese: 敵か味方か!? 銀城の見えない心！)	Directed by : Geisei Morita; Storyboarded by : Takehiro Nakayama	Kento Shimoyama	Shuji Maruyama, Makoto Koga & Masaru Yamada	January 17, 2012	August 17, 2014
357	15	"Tsukishima's Ability...the Danger Is Drawing Near!"; Transliteration: "Shinobiyoru Kyōi...Tsukishima no Nōryoku!" (Japanese: 忍び寄る脅威…月島の能力！)	Directed by : Tadahito Matsubayashi; Storyboarded by : Noriyuki Abe	Kento Shimoyama	Sanae Shimada	January 24, 2012	August 24, 2014
358	16	"Clash?! Xcution Attacks Ginjō!"; Transliteration: "Gekitotsu!? Ginjō o Osou Ekusukyūshon!" (Japanese: 激突!? 銀城を襲うXCUTION！)	Directed by : Yasuto Nishikata; Storyboarded by : Yuzuru Tachikawa	Kazuyuki Fudeyasu	Tomomi Umemura	January 31, 2012	September 7, 2014
359	17	"The Sorrowful Battle! Ichigo vs. Sado & Orihime"; Transliteration: "Kanashimi no Tatakai! Ichigo tai Sado to Orihime" (Japanese: 哀しみの戦い！一護vs茶渡&織姫！)	Directed by : Rokō Ogiwara; Storyboarded by : Tetsuhito Saito	Masahiro Okubo	Natsuko Suzuki & Gi Nam Kim	February 7, 2012	September 14, 2014
360	18	"Ichigo vs. Uryū?! Who Is the Traitor?!"; Transliteration: "Ichigo tai Uryū!? Uragiri-mono wa Dare da!" (Japanese: 一護vs雨竜!? 裏切り者は誰だ！)	Directed by : Ogura Shirakawa; Storyboarded by : Junya Koshiba	Masahiro Okubo	Masaya Ōnishi	February 14, 2012	September 21, 2014
361	19	"A New Appearance! The Gotei 13 Arrives!"; Transliteration: "Arata na Sugata! Gotei Jūsan-tai, Kenzan!" (Japanese: 新たな姿！護廷十三隊、見参！)	Tadahito Matsubayashi	Kento Shimoyama	Masashi Kudo	February 21, 2012	September 28, 2014
362	20	"Revival! Substitute Shinigami: Ichigo Kurosaki!"; Transliteration: "Fukkatsu! Shinigami Daikō: Kurosaki Ichigo!" (Japanese: 復活！死神代行・黒崎一護！)	Directed by : Mitsutaka Noshitani; Storyboarded by : Yasuto Nishikata	Kazuyuki Fudeyasu	Yukari Takeuchi	February 28, 2012	October 5, 2014
363	21	"Fierce Fighting! Shinigami vs. Xcution!"; Transliteration: "Gekitō! Shinigami tai Ekusukyūshon!" (Japanese: 激闘！死神vsXCUTION！)	Directed by : Ogura Shirakawa; Storyboarded by : Junya Koshiba	Mio Imamura	Makoto Shimojima	March 6, 2012	October 12, 2014
364	22	"Desperate Struggle?! Byakuya's Troubled Memories"; Transliteration: "Zettai Zetsumei!? Kako o Hasamareta Byakuya" (Japanese: 絶体絶命!? 過去を挟まれた白哉)	Directed by : Rokō Ogiwara; Storyboarded by : Tadahito Matsubayashi	Mio Imamura	Natsuko Suzuki & Yukari Takeuchi	March 13, 2012	October 19, 2014
365	23	"Ichigo vs. Ginjō! Secret of the Substitute Badge"; Transliteration: "Ichigo tai Ginjō! Daikōshō no Himitsu" (Japanese: 一護vs銀城！代行証の秘密)	Directed by : Kazunori Mizuno; Storyboarded by : Junya Koshiba & Tetsuhito Saito	Kento Shimoyama	Sanae Shimada & Masaya Ōnishi	March 20, 2012	October 26, 2014
366	24	"Changing History, Unchanging Heart"; Transliteration: "Kawariyuku Rekishi, Kawaranu Kokoro" (Japanese: 変わりゆく歴史、変わらぬ心)	Yasuto Nishikata & Noriyuki Abe	Kento Shimoyama	Yoko Suzuki & Tomomi Umemura	March 27, 2012	November 2, 2014

=== Bleach: Thousand-Year Blood War (2022–2026) ===
==== Part 1: The Blood Warfare (2022) ====
No. overall (Note: Episode number continuing from the previous anime series, which is based on the same manga)	No. in series (Note: Episode number within the Thousand-Year Blood War anime series)	Title	Directed by	Written by	Storyboarded by	Chief animation directed by	Original release date	English air date
367	1	"The Blood Warfare" (Note: Stylized in all caps)	Hikaru Murata	Tomohisa Taguchi	Tomohisa Taguchi	Masashi Kudo	October 11, 2022 (Note: TV Tokyo listed the first cours as airing on Monday at 24:00, which is effectively Tuesday at midnight JST.)	May 18, 2025
368	2	"Foundation Stones"	Mitsutoshi Satō	Tomohisa Taguchi	Tomohisa Taguchi	Michio Hasegawa	October 18, 2022	May 25, 2025
369	3	"March of the StarCross"	Hodaka Kuramoto	Tomohisa Taguchi	Hikaru Yamaguchi	Kumiko Takayanagi	October 25, 2022	June 1, 2025
370	4	"Kill the Shadow" (Note: Stylized in start case)	Hikaru Murata	Tomohisa Taguchi	Hikaru Murata	Kiyoshi Komatsubara	November 1, 2022	June 8, 2025
371	5	"Wrath as a Lightning"	Mitsutoshi Satō	Masaki Hiramatsu	Mitsutoshi Satō	Michio Hasegawa	November 8, 2022	June 15, 2025
372	6	"The Fire"	Ema Saito	Masaki Hiramatsu	Tomohisa Taguchi	N/A	November 15, 2022	June 22, 2025
373	7	"Born in the Dark"	Shinichirō Ueda	Masaki Hiramatsu	Toshiyuki Tsuru	Kumiko Takayanagi	November 22, 2022	June 29, 2025
374	8	"The Shooting Star Project (Zero Mix)" (Note: Stylized as "The Shooting Star Project (ZERO MIX)")	Young-Hoon Jung	Masaki Hiramatsu	Shinji Itadaki	Kiyoshi Komatsubara	November 29, 2022	July 20, 2025
375	9	"The Drop"	Kaito Asakura	Masaki Hiramatsu	Kaito Asakura	Michio Hasegawa	December 6, 2022	July 27, 2025
376	10	"The Battle"	Hikaru Murata	Masaki Hiramatsu	Hikaru Murata	Kumiko Takayanagi	December 13, 2022	August 3, 2025
377	11	"Everything But the Rain"	Yusaku Kikuchi	Masaki Hiramatsu	Mitsutoshi Satō	Kiyoshi Komatsubara	December 20, 2022	August 10, 2025
378	12	"Everything But the Rain "June Truth"" (Note: Stylized as "EVERYTHING BUT THE RAIN “June Truth”")	Young-Hoon Jung	Masaki Hiramatsu	Shinji Itadaki & Kentarō Tokiwa	Michio Hasegawa	December 27, 2022 (Note: The first cours' finale aired as a one-hour special, with the 12th and 13th episodes premiering back-to-back.)	August 17, 2025
379	13	"The Blade Is Me"	Tomohisa Taguchi, Mitsutoshi Satō & Yoshinori Odaka	Masaki Hiramatsu	Tomohisa Taguchi	Kumiko Takayanagi	December 27, 2022	August 24, 2025

==== Part 2: The Separation (2023) ====
No. overall	No. in series	Title	Directed by	Written by	Storyboarded by	Chief animation directed by	Original release date	English air date
380	14	"The Last 9 Days" (Note: Stylized as "THE LAST 9DAYS")	Hikaru Murata	Masaki Hiramatsu	Tomohisa Taguchi, Hikaru Murata & Yusaku Kikuchi	Kiyoshi Komatsubara	July 8, 2023	August 31, 2025
381	15	"Peace from Shadows"	Yusaku Kikuchi	Masaki Hiramatsu	Shinji Itadaki	Michio Hasegawa	July 15, 2023	September 7, 2025
382	16	"The Fundamental Virulence"	Ōri Yasukawa	Masaki Hiramatsu	Yōichi Fujita	Kumiko Takayanagi	July 22, 2023	September 14, 2025
383	17	"Heart of Wolf" (Note: Stylized as "HEART of WOLF")	Shinichirō Ueda	Masaki Hiramatsu	Shinichirō Ueda	Kiyoshi Komatsubara	July 29, 2023	September 21, 2025
384	18	"Rages at Ringside"	Itoko Nagai	Masaki Hiramatsu	Atsushi Wakabayashi	Kumiko Takayanagi	August 5, 2023	September 28, 2025
385	19	"The White Haze"	Dali Chen	Masaki Hiramatsu	Tomohisa Taguchi & Shinji Itadaki	Michio Hasegawa	August 12, 2023	October 5, 2025
386	20	"I Am the Edge"	Yusaku Kikuchi	Masaki Hiramatsu	Wataru Yamamoto	Kiyoshi Komatsubara	August 19, 2023	October 12, 2025
387	21	"The Headless Star"	Mitsutoshi Satō	Masaki Hiramatsu	Mitsutoshi Satō	Michio Hasegawa	August 26, 2023	October 19, 2025
388	22	"Marching Out the Zombies" (Note: Stylized as "Marching Out the ZOMBIES")	Young-Hoon Jung	Masaki Hiramatsu	Yōichi Fujita	Kiyoshi Komatsubara	September 9, 2023	October 26, 2025
389	23	"Marching Out the Zombies 2" (Note: Stylized as "Marching Out the ZOMBIES 2")	Takahiro Enokida	Masaki Hiramatsu	Atsushi Wakabayashi	Kumiko Takayanagi	September 16, 2023	November 2, 2025
390	24	"Too Early to Win, Too Late to Know" (Note: Stylized without the comma)	Takahiro Ōtsuka	Masaki Hiramatsu	Yōichi Fujita	Kumiko Takayanagi	September 23, 2023	November 9, 2025
391	25	"The Master"	Shinichirō Ueda	Masaki Hiramatsu	Shinichirō Ueda	Kiyoshi Komatsubara	September 30, 2023 (Note: The second cours' finale aired as a one-hour special, with the 25th and 26th episodes premiering back-to-back.)	November 16, 2025
392	26	"Black"	Hikaru Murata, Dali Chen, Takahiro Enokida & Itoko Nagai	Masaki Hiramatsu	Hikaru Murata	Michio Hasegawa, Kiyoshi Komatsubara & Kumiko Takayanagi	September 30, 2023	November 23, 2025

==== Part 3: The Conflict (2024) ====
No. overall	No. in series	Title	Directed by	Written by	Storyboarded by	Chief animation directed by	Original release date	English air date
393	27	"A"	Hikaru Murata	Masaki Hiramatsu & Tomohisa Taguchi	Hikaru Murata	Michio Hasegawa	October 5, 2024	November 30, 2025
394	28	"Kill the King"	Yoshinori Odaka & Hikaru Murata	Masaki Hiramatsu	Tomohisa Taguchi	Kumiko Takayanagi	October 12, 2024	December 7, 2025
395	29	"The Dark Arm"	Young-Hoon Jung	Masaki Hiramatsu	Young-Hoon Jung	Michio Hasegawa	October 19, 2024	December 14, 2025
396	30	"The Betrayer"	Itoko Nagai	Masaki Hiramatsu	Yōichi Fujita	Kiyoshi Komatsubara	October 26, 2024	December 21, 2025
397	31	"Against the Judgement"	Takumi Ichikawa	Masaki Hiramatsu	Takumi Ichikawa	Michio Hasegawa	November 2, 2024	January 4, 2026
398	32	"The Holy Newborn"	Shinichirō Ueda	Masaki Hiramatsu	Shinichirō Ueda	Kumiko Takayanagi	November 9, 2024	January 11, 2026
399	33	"Gate of the Sun"	Dali Chen	Masaki Hiramatsu	Dali Chen	Kiyoshi Komatsubara	November 16, 2024	January 18, 2026
400	34	"Baby, Hold Your Hand"	Takahiro Ōtsuka	Masaki Hiramatsu	Atsushi Wakabayashi	Michio Hasegawa	November 23, 2024	January 25, 2026
401	35	"Don't Chase a Shadow"	Ema Saito, Tomohisa Taguchi, Shintaro Matsui & Hikaru Murata	Masaki Hiramatsu	Ema Saito	Kumiko Takayanagi	November 30, 2024	February 1, 2026
402	36	"Baby, Hold Your Hand 2 [Never Ending My Dream]" (Note: Stylized as "BABY, HOLD YOUR HAND 2 [Never Ending My Dream]")	Young-Hoon Jung	Masaki Hiramatsu	Susumu Nishizawa	Kiyoshi Komatsubara	December 7, 2024	February 8, 2026
403	37	"Shadows Gone"	Shinichirō Ueda	Masaki Hiramatsu	Shinichirō Ueda	Michio Hasegawa	December 14, 2024	February 15, 2026
404	38	"Friend" (Note: Stylized in all lowercase)	Dali Chen	Masaki Hiramatsu	Toshiyuki Tsuru (Note: Credited as Yasuaki Kurotsu)	Kiyoshi Komatsubara	December 21, 2024	February 22, 2026
405	39	"The Visible Answer"	Itoko Nagai	Masaki Hiramatsu	Itoko Nagai	Michio Hasegawa	December 28, 2024 (Note: The third cours' finale was a one-hour special, with the 39th and 40th episodes premiering back-to-back.)	March 1, 2026
406	40	"My Last Words"	Hikaru Murata & Tomohisa Taguchi	Masaki Hiramatsu	Hikaru Murata	Kumiko Takayanagi	December 28, 2024	March 8, 2026

==== Part 4: The Calamity (2026) ====
No. overall	No. in series	Title	Directed by	Written by	Storyboarded by	Chief animation directed by	Original release date	English air date
407	41	"God of Thunder"	Dali Chen	Masaki Hiramatsu & Tomohisa Taguchi	Dali Chen	Kumiko Takayanagi	July 25, 2026	TBA
408	42	"Son of Darkness"	Shintaro Matsui	Masaki Hiramatsu & Tomohisa Taguchi	Shintaro Matsui	Kiyoshi Komatsubara	August 1, 2026	TBA
409	43	"Blood for My Bone"	Shinichirō Ueda	Masaki Hiramatsu & Tomohisa Taguchi	Shinichirō Ueda	Michio Hasegawa	August 8, 2026	TBA
410	44	"The Perfect Crimson"	Young-Hoon Jung	Masaki Hiramatsu	Young-Hoon Jung	Kumiko Takayanagi	August 15, 2026	TBA
411	45	"Defend You" (Note: The full title is actually "Life to Defend You" stylized in all caps, which is revealed at the end of the episode. However, official marketing still lists the incomplete title.)	Tomohisa Taguchi	Tomohisa Taguchi	Tomohisa Taguchi	Kiyoshi Komatsubara	August 22, 2026	TBA
412	46	"The End"	Itoko Nagai	Tomohisa Taguchi	Itoko Nagai	Michio Hasegawa	August 29, 2026	TBA
413	47	"The End 2"	Shintaro Matsui	Tomohisa Taguchi	Kyosuke Shijo	Kumiko Takayanagi	September 5, 2026	TBA
414	48	"The End Two World"	Shinichirō Ueda	Masaki Hiramatsu	Shinichirō Ueda	Kiyoshi Komatsubara	September 12, 2026	TBA
415	49	"The Blade"	Dali Chen, Shintaro Matsui & Tomohisa Taguchi	Tomohisa Taguchi	Satoshi Sakai & Tomohisa Taguchi	Michio Hasegawa	October 20, 2026	TBA
416	50	"Death & Strawberry"	Hikaru Murata	Masaki Hiramatsu	Hikaru Murata	Kiyoshi Komatsubara, Kumiko Takayanagi & Masashi Kudo	October 27, 2026	TBA

== Specials ==
SP#	Title
1	"Bleach Jump Festa 2004 Anime Tour: Memories in the Rain"
This special, shown in Japan at the Jump Festa 2004 Anime Tour, is a pilot episode for the series. It focuses more on Ichigo's feelings regarding his mother's death. Tite Kubo, the creator of Bleach, voices Kon in this special instead of Mitsuaki Madono, the original voice actor of Kon. The closing theme used for the episode is "Memories in the Rain" by Masakazu Morita, the voice actor of Ichigo, and Fumiko Orikasa, the voice actress of Rukia. This special serves as an alternative version of episodes 8 and 9 of the anime series.
2	"Bleach Jump Festa 2005 Anime Tour: The Sealed Sword Frenzy"
This special, shown in Japan at the Jump Festa 2005 Anime Tour, is set after the events of season three (after episode 63). Baishin, a Soul Reaper sealed by Soul Society four hundred years before the start of the series, escapes his confinement. He battles Ichigo and drains half of his spiritual energy. To aid Ichigo, Rukia, Renji and several other Soul Reaper captains travel to the world of the living. After using his bankai, Baishin is able to fend off the various Soul Reapers, and is defeated by Ichigo Kurosaki after Ichigo uses his own bankai. Afterwards, Ichigo reveals that Baishin had fused with his zanpakutō and was seeking a way to free himself from his sword. The closing theme for the episode is "Ditty For Daddy" by Shiro Sagisu.

== DVD releases ==
=== Japanese ===
The 88 DVD compilations of the series are grouped by season and were released in Japan by Aniplex between February 2, 2005, and January 23, 2013.

Season 1
Volume	Release date	Episodes
1	February 2, 2005	1–4
2	March 2, 2005	5–8
3	April 13, 2005	9–12
4	May 11, 2005	13–16
5	June 1, 2005	17–20

Season 2
Volume	Release date	Episodes
1	July 27, 2005	21–24
2	August 24, 2005	25–28
3	September 28, 2005	29–32
4	October 26, 2005	33–36
5	November 23, 2005	37–41

Season 3
Volume	Release date	Episodes
1	December 21, 2005	42–45
2	January 25, 2006	46–49
3	February 22, 2006	50–53
4	March 29, 2006	54–58
5	April 26, 2006	59–63

Season 4
Volume	Release date	Episodes
1	May 24, 2006	64–67
2	June 28, 2006	68–71
3	July 26, 2006	72–75
4	August 23, 2006	76–79
5	October 25, 2006	80–83
6	November 22, 2006	84–87
7	December 20, 2006	88–91

Season 5
Volume	Release date	Episodes
1	January 24, 2007	92–95
2	February 28, 2007	96–99
3	March 28, 2007	100–104
4	April 25, 2007	105–109

Season 6
Volume	Release date	Episodes
1	June 27, 2007	110–113
2	July 25, 2007	114–117
3	August 22, 2007	118–121
4	September 25, 2007	122–126
5	October 24, 2007	127–131

Season 7
Volume	Release date	Episodes
1	December 19, 2007	132–135
2	January 23, 2008	136–139
3	February 27, 2008	140–143
4	March 26, 2008	144–147
5	April 23, 2008	148–151

Season 8
Volume	Release date	Episodes
1	May 28, 2008	152–155
2	June 25, 2008	156–159
3	July 23, 2008	160–163
4	August 27, 2008	164–167

Season 9
Volume	Release date	Episodes
1	November 26, 2008	168–171
2	December 17, 2008	172–175
3	January 28, 2009	176–179
4	February 25, 2009	180–184
5	March 25, 2009	185–189

Season 10
Volume	Release date	Episodes
1	May 27, 2009	190–193
2	June 24, 2009	194–197
3	July 22, 2009	198–201
4	August 26, 2009	202–205

Season 11
Volume	Release date	Episodes
1	November 25, 2009	206–208
2	December 16, 2009	209–212

Season 12
Volume	Release date	Episodes
1	January 27, 2010	213–216
2	February 24, 2010	217–220
3	March 25, 2010	221–224
4	April 25, 2010	225–229

Season 13
Volume	Release date	Episodes
1	May 26, 2010	230–233
2	June 23, 2010	234–237
3	July 21, 2010	238–241
4	August 25, 2010	242–245
5	September 22, 2010	246–249
6	October 27, 2010	250–253
7	November 24, 2010	254–257
8	December 15, 2010	258–261
9	January 26, 2011	262–265

Season 14
Volume	Release date	Episodes
1	February 23, 2011	266–270
2	March 23, 2011	271–274
3	April 27, 2011	275–278
4	May 25, 2011	279–282
5	June 22, 2011	283–286
6	July 16, 2011	287–291
7	August 24, 2011	292–295
8	September 21, 2011	296–299
9	October 26, 2011	300–303
10	November 23, 2011	304–307
11	December 14, 2011	308–311
12	January 25, 2012	312–316

Season 15
Volume	Release date	Episodes
1	February 22, 2012	317–321
2	March 21, 2012	322–325
3	April 25, 2012	326–329
4	May 23, 2012	330–333
5	June 27, 2012	334–337
6	July 25, 2012	338–342

Season 16
Volume	Release date	Episodes
1	August 22, 2012	343–346
2	September 26, 2012	347–350
3	October 24, 2012	351–354
4	November 21, 2012	355–358
5	December 19, 2012	359–362
6	January 23, 2013	363–366

=== English ===
The first 32 DVD compilations have been released by Viz Media in the United States. 26 DVD collection box set of the series were released from June 10, 2008, to September 29, 2015. From July 19, 2016, to December 7, 2021, Viz released the series on Blu-Ray, with a total of 13 sets, half the number of DVD sets.

The series has been released in the United Kingdom by Manga Entertainment in half-season sets, then re-released into season sets.

Viz Media (Region 1)
Volume	Release date	Season/Box Set	Release date	Episodes	
1	November 28, 2006	1	June 10, 2008	1–4	
2	January 30, 2007	1	June 10, 2008	5–8	
3	March 27, 2007	1	June 10, 2008	9–12	
4	May 29, 2007	1	June 10, 2008	13–16	
5	July 31, 2007	1	June 10, 2008	17–20	
6	September 25, 2007	2	August 19, 2008	21–24	
7	November 17, 2007	2	August 19, 2008	25–28	
8	January 15, 2008	2	August 19, 2008	29–32	
9	March 18, 2008	2	August 19, 2008	33–36	
10	May 20, 2008	2	August 19, 2008	37–41	
11	July 22, 2008	3	July 7, 2009	42–45	
12	September 23, 2008	3	July 7, 2009	46–49	
13	November 18, 2008	3	July 7, 2009	50–53	
14	January 20, 2009	3	July 7, 2009	54–58	
15	March 17, 2009	3	July 7, 2009	59–63	
16	May 13, 2009	4 Part 1	November 3, 2009	64–67	
17	June 16, 2009	4 Part 1	November 3, 2009	68–71	
18	July 14, 2009	4 Part 1	November 3, 2009	72–75	
19	August 18, 2009	4 Part 1	November 3, 2009	76–79	
20	September 15, 2009	4 Part 2	February 16, 2010	80–83	
21	October 20, 2009	4 Part 2	February 16, 2010	84–87	
22	November 17, 2009	4 Part 2	February 16, 2010	88–91	
23	December 15, 2009	5	June 8, 2010	92–95	
24	January 19, 2010	5	June 8, 2010	96–99	
25	February 23, 2010	5	June 8, 2010	100–104	
26	March 23, 2010	5	June 8, 2010	105–109	
27	April 20, 2010	6	September 28, 2010	110–113	
28	May 25, 2010	6	September 28, 2010	114–117	
29	June 22, 2010	6	September 28, 2010	118–121	
30	July 20, 2010	7	December 21, 2010	122–126	122–133; 134–145
31	August 24, 2010	7	December 21, 2010	127–131	122–133; 134–145
32	September 21, 2010	8	March 22, 2011	132–135	122–133; 134–145
		9	June 21, 2011	146–156	
		10	September 6, 2011	157–167	
		11	December 13, 2011	168–179	
		12	March 13, 2012	180–193	
		13	June 12, 2012	194–205	
		14	September 11, 2012	206–217	
		15	December 11, 2012	218–229	
		16	March 12, 2013	230–242	
		17	June 11, 2013	243–255	
		18	September 10, 2013	256–267	
		19	December 10, 2013	268–279	
		20	March 18, 2014	280–291	
		21	June 3, 2014	292–303	
		22	September 30, 2014	304–316	
		23	December 16, 2014	317–329	
		24	March 17, 2015	330–342	
		25	June 23, 2015	343–354	
		26	September 29, 2015	355–366	

Manga Entertainment (Region 2)
Series	Release date		Episodes	Arc
1	November 5, 2007 (Part 1)	May 5, 2008 (Complete)	1–12	The Substitute
1	February 25, 2008 (Part 2)	May 5, 2008 (Complete)	13–20	The Substitute
2	June 30, 2008 (Part 1)	December 29, 2008 (Complete)	21–32	The Entry
2	November 3, 2008 (Part 2)	December 29, 2008 (Complete)	33–41	The Entry
3	March 23, 2009 (Part 1)	August 17, 2009 (Complete)	42–53	The Rescue
3	June 15, 2009 (Part 2)	August 17, 2009 (Complete)	54–63	The Rescue
4	October 26, 2009 (Part 1)	August 9, 2010 (Complete)	64–71	The Bount
4	March 1, 2010 (Part 2)	August 9, 2010 (Complete)	72–79	The Bount
4	June 7, 2010 (Part 3)	August 9, 2010 (Complete)	80–91	The Bount
5	August 30, 2010 (Part 1)	December 20, 2010 (Complete)	92–99	The Bount Assault
5	November 1, 2010 (Part 2)	December 20, 2010 (Complete)	100–109	The Bount Assault
6	April 11, 2011 (Part 1)	September 26, 2011 (Complete)	110–120	Arrancar: The Arrival
6	June 13, 2011 (Part 2)	September 26, 2011 (Complete)	121–131	Arrancar: The Arrival
7	September 26, 2011 (Part 1)	December 12, 2011 (Complete)	132–141	Arrancar: The Hueco Mundo
7	October 17, 2011 (Part 2)	December 12, 2011 (Complete)	142–151	Arrancar: The Hueco Mundo
8	March 19, 2012 (Part 1)	October 29, 2012 (Complete)	152–159	Arrancar: The Fierce Fight
8	May 14, 2012 (Part 2)	October 29, 2012 (Complete)	160–167	Arrancar: The Fierce Fight
9	June 25, 2012 (Part 1)	December 31, 2012 (Complete)	168–178	The New Leader Shûsuke Amagai
9	August 6, 2012 (Part 2)	December 31, 2012 (Complete)	179–189	The New Leader Shûsuke Amagai
10	January 14, 2013 (Part 1)	May 20, 2013 (Complete)	190–201	Arrancar vs Shinigami & The Past
10	March 11, 2013 (Part 2)	May 20, 2013 (Complete)	202–212	Arrancar vs Shinigami & The Past
11	September 9, 2013		213–229	Battle in Karakura
12	October 28, 2013 (Part 1)	July 7, 2014 (Complete)	230–241	Zanpakuto: The Alternate Tale
12	December 23, 2013 (Part 2)	July 7, 2014 (Complete)	242–253	Zanpakuto: The Alternate Tale
12	February 17, 2014 (Part 3)	July 7, 2014 (Complete)	254–265	Zanpakuto: The Alternate Tale
13	April 7, 2014 (Part 1)	December 15, 2014 (Complete)	266–278	Fall Of The Arrancar
13	June 9, 2014 (Part 2)	December 15, 2014 (Complete)	279–291	Fall Of The Arrancar
14	September 22, 2014 (Part 1)	September 21, 2015 (Complete)	292–303	Fall Of The Arrancar 2
14	April 6, 2015 (Part 2)	September 21, 2015 (Complete)	304–316	Fall Of The Arrancar 2
15	May 25, 2015 (Part 1)	December 28, 2015 (Complete)	317–329	The Invading Army
15	June 29, 2015 (Part 2)	December 28, 2015 (Complete)	330–342	The Invading Army
16	July 20, 2015 (Part 1)	February 6, 2017 (Complete)	343–354	The Lost Agent
16	September 28, 2015 (Part 2)	February 6, 2017 (Complete)	355–366	The Lost Agent

Madman Entertainment (Region 4)
Collection	Release date	Episodes
1	June 11, 2008	1–20
2	May 20, 2009	21–41
3	February 17, 2010	42–63
4	November 3, 2010	64–79
5	December 15, 2010	80–91
6	January 12, 2011	92–109
7	February 16, 2011	110–121
8	March 16, 2011	122–133
9	June 15, 2011	134–145
10	August 17, 2011	146–156
11	November 16, 2011	157–167
12	March 21, 2012	168–179
13	May 23, 2012	180–193
14	July 4, 2012	194–205
15	October 24, 2012	206–217
16	January 9, 2013	218–229
17	April 17, 2013	230–242
18	July 3, 2013	243–255
19	November 20, 2013	256–267
20	March 19, 2014	268–279
21	May 21, 2014	280–291
22	August 20, 2014	292–303
23	January 7, 2015	304–316
24	March 11, 2015	317–329
25	May 20, 2015	330–342
26	August 5, 2015	343–354
27	November 18, 2015	355–366

Bleach Bankai Box Set	Release date	Episodes
1	May 21, 2014	1–133
2	May 21, 2014	134–229
3	April 6, 2016	230–303
4	April 6, 2016	304–366

== Blu-ray releases ==
Viz Media (Region A)
Set	Date	Discs	Episodes
1	July 19, 2016	4	1–27
2	January 31, 2017	4	28–55
3	October 24, 2017	4	56–83
4	May 15, 2018	4	84–111
5	December 3, 2019	4	112–139
6	March 10, 2020	4	140–167
7	June 30, 2020	4	168–195
8	September 29, 2020	4	196–223
9	December 8, 2020	4	224–251
10	May 4, 2021	4	252–279
11	June 29, 2021	4	280–308
12	September 7, 2021	4	309–337
13	December 7, 2021	4	338–366
14	March 26, 2024	2	367–379
15	October 22, 2024	2	380–392
16	January 13, 2026	2	393–406
