= Bleach season 15 =

Season of television series

Bleach
- Season 15
- Cover art for the first home media volume of the Gotei 13 Invading Army arc as released by Aniplex, featuring Renji Abarai (L) and Ichigo Kurosaki (R)
- No. of episodes: 26

Release
- Original network: TV Tokyo
- Original release: April 12 – October 4, 2011

Season chronology
- ← Previous; Season 14 Next → Season 16

The fifteenth and penultimate season of the Bleach anime television series is known as the Gotei 13 Invading Army arc (護廷十三隊侵軍篇, Gotei Jūsan Tai Shingun-hen). It is directed by Noriyuki Abe, and produced by TV Tokyo, Dentsu, and Studio Pierrot. The season's twenty-six episodes are based on Tite Kubo's manga series of the same name, but follows an original storyline exclusive to the anime. Before Ichigo Kurosaki loses his Soul Reaper powers, the arc follows him and his allies, defending a mysterious girl named Nozomi Kujo from Kageroza Inaba, an evil former Soul Reaper scientist, and his army of Soul Reaper reigai (clones) based on real ones in the Soul Society.

The season aired from April 12 to October 4, 2011. Aniplex collected it in six DVD volumes between February 22 and July 25, 2012. The English adaptation of the Bleach anime is licensed by Viz Media, and the season aired on Adult Swim's Toonami programming block from October 6, 2013, to April 27, 2014.

The episodes of this season use three pieces of theme music; one opening and two endings. The opening theme song is "Blue" performed by Vivid. The first ending theme song, "Aoi Tori" (アオイトリ; lit. 'Blue Bird') performed by Fumika, is used from episode 317 to 329. The second ending theme song, "Haruka Kanata" (ハルカカナタ) performed by Unlimits, is used from episodes 330 to 342.

== Episodes ==
No. overall	No. in season	Title	Directed by (Note: Production staff information is taken from the ending credits of each episode.)	Written by	Animation directed by	Original release date	English air date
317	1	"Unusual Incident in Seireitei?! The Gotei 13 Invading Army Arc!"; Transliteration: "Seireitei ni Ihen! Gotei Jūsan-tai Shingun-hen!" (Japanese: 瀞霊廷に異変！護廷十三隊侵軍篇!)	Noriyuki Abe	Kento Shimoyama	Masashi Kudo	April 12, 2011	October 6, 2013
After cleansing and restoring the barriers where Karakura Town was temporarily swapped with the Soul Society, Rangiku Matsumoto and Nanao Ise enter the Dangai to return home, but are confronted by something along the way. Their captains, who have lost contact with them, are worried sick with their disappearances until they suddenly return a day later. Rangiku and Nanao were gone only a few hours and came back directly, which concludes that the time in the Dangai is out of sync with the Soul Society. Mayuri Kurotsuchi conducts a survey of the area with Kenpachi Zaraki assisting as a security escort. Meanwhile, while Ichigo Kurosaki and Rukia Kuchiki go off to handle hollows, Kon leaves to investigate a spiritual disturbance and finds a green-haired girl lying asleep and covered in rags. Ichigo returns home and becomes furious with Kon, who has brought back the green-haired girl. While the survey is going on, Mayuri and Kenpachi are confronted by an intense light emerging from the walls of the Dangai. As Ichigo and Rukia return through the Dangai to the Soul Society, they are chased by the supposedly revived Kōtotsu. To save themselves, Ichigo uses his bankai and carries Rukia all the way to the Soul Society, but falls to the ground due to the gradual loss of his powers. Ichigo then encounters Tōshirō Hitsugaya and Byakuya Kuchiki, who place him under confinement. A mysterious scientist in a laboratory addresses what seems to be body doubles of Izuru Kira and Nanao.
318	2	"Renji vs. Rukia?! Battle with Comrades!"; Transliteration: "Renji tai Rukia!? Nakama to no Tatakai!" (Japanese: 恋次vsルキア!? 仲間との戦い！)	Kazunori Mizuno	Kento Shimoyama	Masahiko Komino	April 19, 2011	October 13, 2013
While Kon tries to keep the green-haired girl, whose name is Nozomi Kujō, a secret from Ichigo's family. Rukia sneaks in Ichigo's jail cell and frees him. Jūshirō Ukitake and Shunsui Kyōraku discuss about Ichigo's possible involvement with the disappearances, since his substitute badge was found by Byakuya inside the Dangai. While Rukia explains to Ichigo there is a time gap between the human world and the Soul Society, they are then confronted by Renji Abarai and Ikkaku Madarame, who exhibit ruthless behaviors unlike themselves. Yoruichi Shihōin arrives and seals Renji and Ikkaku before escaping with Ichigo and Rukia into her hideout. She explains to them that Renji and Ikkaku were secretly replaced by reigai, artificial bodies which allows modified souls to maintain a physical form in Soul Society. The reigai, which closely imitate the features of a Soul Reaper, are being used to test out soul candies, which means someone in the twelfth division is involved. Ichigo and Rukia later sneak into the laboratory and discover that Nozomi is a fugitive from the Soul Society. The mysterious scientist along with Kira and Nanao's reigai arrive in the human world to apprehend Nozomi, who evades capture. Kon follows her and both are eventually cornered by the scientist. However, Uryū Ishida arrives to help the two.
319	3	"Ichigo's Capture Net! Escape from Soul Society!"; Transliteration: "Ichigo Hobakumō! Sōru Sosaeti o Dasshutsu se yo!" (Japanese: 一護捕縛網！尸魂界(ソウル・ソサエティ)を脱出せよ！)	Yuzuru Tachikawa	Kento Shimoyama	Shinichi Kurita	April 26, 2011	October 20, 2013
Uryū confronts the mysterious scientist while Ichigo, Rukia, and Yoruichi plan their escape from the Soul Society, assuming that several reigai have blocked the Senkaimon, the gateway to the Dangai. Uryū is defeated by the scientist's shikai of his zanpakutō, Raikū. Yoruichi fights the reigai to let Ichigo and Rukia escape. Kon is unable to respond, and an unconscious Nozomi is captured by Kira and Nanao's reigai. While showing up and attempting to save Uryū, Yasutora "Chad" Sado is defeated when trying to buy time for Orihime Inoue to heal Uryū. Ichigo and Rukia arrive to stop the scientist, revealed to be Kagerōza Inaba, who easily deals with Ichigo in his weakening state. Just as he is about to kill Ichigo and Rukia, the other captains and lieutenants involved in the incident arrive, retrieving Nozomi and forcing Inaba and the reigai to retreat. Admitting that he is behind the reigai incident, Inaba then claims that once he has Nozomi, he will be able to conquer the Soul Society and the world of the living. Inaba escapes to the Soul Society and meets with the reigai. He tasks them with getting Nozomi back and eliminating the originals, as he deems them the Invading Army.
320	4	"The Gotei 13, Gathering in the Real World!"; Transliteration: "Gotei Jūsan-tai, Gense ni Shūketsu!" (Japanese: 護廷十三隊、現世に集結！)	Directed by : Kazuo Nogami; Storyboarded by : Minoru Murao	Masahiro Okubo	Yukari Takeuchi	May 3, 2011	October 27, 2013
Ichigo, Kon, Orihime, Uryū and Chad are all in Kisuke Urahara's shop looking after Nozomi. Rukia appears and tells Ichigo to join the Soul Reapers in his room to formulate a strategy on Nozomi's protection. Orihime organizes a barbecue to cheer up Nozomi and get her to open up to the others, however she runs away. Kon, Orihime, Uryū and Chad try to find her. A very concerned Kon eventually finds her, later leaving her in the care of Rangiku, but fails to realize that Rangiku is the impostor trying to capture Nozomi. After he realizes that Nozomi was captured by Rangiku, he attempts to save her, however he cannot defeat Rangiku's reigai, and after he himself is defeated, Ichigo, Rukia, Renji and Rangiku all arrive to save Nozomi, and Rangiku's reigai escapes. During the barbecue, Nozomi starts to eat after Kon offers her some of the barbecued food.
321	5	"Ikkaku vs. Ikkaku! Showdown of Mutual Self!"; Transliteration: "Ikkaku tai Ikkaku! Jibun Dōshi no Tatakai!" (Japanese: 一角vs一角！自分同士の戦い！)	Directed by : Mitsutaka Noshitani; Storyboarded by : Masahiko Komino	Masahiro Okubo	Natsuko Suzuki	May 10, 2011	November 3, 2013
Ukitake and Kyōraku, suspecting some sort of foul play in the Soul Society, recall on their previous mandatory captains' meeting, where Mayuri claims and Kenpachi agrees that Ichigo tampered with his work in the Dangai, and it has been decided by Genryūsai Shigekuni Yamamoto that Ichigo will be placed under suspicion. Unbeknownst to Ukitake and Kyōraku, both Mayuri and Kenpachi were actually the imposters. Meanwhile in Karakura Town, Ichigo finds Kon tied up in his closet, which means Nozomi has escaped again. Ichigo and his friends proceed to search for her. Kon manages to find her in a forest, though she is reluctant to return and runs away again. Elsewhere in the forest, Ikkaku, Yumichika Ayasegawa, Shūhei Hisagi and Marechiyo Ōmaeda are confronted by their respective reigai. Ōmaeda is surprised when his reigai appears to be more attractive than him. While Hisagi and Ōmaeda trick their imposters and defeat them, things do not go well for Ikkaku and Yumichika. Luckily, their reigai are fended off after Uryū arrives to join the fray. Ikkaku and Yumichika's reigai retreat, with their respective originals badly injured and unconscious. Kira's reigai approaches Rangiku, Rukia encounters her own reigai, and Suì-Fēng arrests Kyōraku, who has been framed by Inaba.
322	6	"Clash! Rukia vs. Rukia!"; Transliteration: "Gekitotsu! Rukia tai Rukia!" (Japanese: 激突！ルキアvsルキア！)	Directed by : Akane Inoue; Storyboarded by : Yasuto Nishikata & Junya Koshiba	Kazuyuki Fudeyasu	Minoru Morita	May 17, 2011	November 10, 2013
Kon continues to follow Nozomi, who claims to have some sort of uncertain destination to find. Ichigo, Orihime and Chad are seen searching for Nozomi, while Uryū is seen tending to the wounds of Ikkaku, Yumikchika, Hisagi and Ōmaeda. Rangiku, blocking the attacks of Kira's reigai, is surprised when her zanpakutō drops to the ground, since his new and improved zanpakutō can increase the weight of whatever he strikes up to tenfold the amount. However, Rangiku, now subdued, cleverly blocks his zanpakutō with a heavy steel pole, trapping it onto the ground, allowing her to defeat him and cause him to disintegrate. Ukitake, pleading to Central 46 to release Kyōraku, is denied his request, and he later meets with Retsu Unohana, who warns him to be careful. Rukia's reigai is soon joined with Nemu Kurotsuchi's reigai to brawl against Rukia, but Nemu arrives and kills her reigai, which disintegrates and leaves behind a red stone, assuming this is true form of the reigai. Elsewhere, Nozomi tells Kon she must find a place with a row of shrine gates, and Kon agrees to take her to the first place he remembers. Rukia, who apparently defeats her reigai, joins Nemu and Rangiku to search for Nozomi, but Rukia is revealed to actually be the fake Rukia, who then tosses Nemu and Rangiku into the river with the real Rukia. Ukitake is slashed by Kyōraku when freeing him from imprisonment, revealing this Kyōraku to also be a reigai. The false Ukitake meets up with the false Kyōraku, as they prepare to flee.
323	7	"Protect Ichigo! Nozomi's Determination"; Transliteration: "Mamore Ichigo! Nozomi no Ketsui" (Japanese: 護れ一護！望実の決意！)	Directed by : Kazunobu Shimizu; Storyboarded by : Toshihiko Masuda	Kazuyuki Fudeyasu	Manabu Kurihara	May 24, 2011	November 17, 2013
Orihime and Chad find Rukia, Nemu and Rangiku washed up on the shore of the river. As Orihime goes to heal them, Chad is attacked by Renji's reigai. In the Soul Society, Ukitake and Kyōraku's reigai confront Yamamoto, who claims he has known all along about their intent to kill him. Unohana meets with Isane Kotetsu and explains to her that she has gone through secret archives of the Soul Society and has determined Inaba as the perpetrator. Inaba then reveals himself and demonstrates the power of his zanpakutō as Isane attacks him. Unohana infers that he has used his research to form a zanpakutō that can move through both space and time. Inaba confirms this and then retreats. As Chad is confronting the false Renji, the real Renji appears and attacks his imposter, both eventually defeating the reigai. Meanwhile, Nozomi explains to Kon that the human world has several natural Senkaimon, some leading to empty voids. Her plan is to enter one and vanish, rendering Inaba unable to capture her. The reigai of Rukia, Rangiku, Ikkaku, Yumichika, Hisagi and Ōmaeda appear to apprehend her, but they are confronted by Ichigo, who unleashes a powerful Getsuga Tenshō, destroying them all.
324	8	"Recapture Seireitei! The Captains Move!"; Transliteration: "Seireitei Dakkan e! Taichō-tachi, Ugoku!" (Japanese: 瀞霊廷奪還へ！隊長たち、動く！)	Directed by : Yasuto Nishikata; Storyboarded by : Atsushi Wakabayashi	Kento Shimoyama	Masaya Ōnishi	May 31, 2011	November 24, 2013
Hitsugaya, Byakuya, Kenpachi, Yachiru Kusajishi and Sajin Komamura, the five Soul Reapers trapped in the living world, use Urahara's Senkaimon to return to the Soul Society. They fall into Inaba's trap in the Dangai, where Komamura stays behind to counter the kōryū, the restrictive current passing through the Dangai. As the other three arrive, they go their separate ways. Kenpachi encounters his false counterpart and engages in fierce combat. At first being defeated, he then regains the upper hand and destroys his reigai after encouragement from Yachiru. Meanwhile, Ukitake and Kyōraku's reigai continue their battle with Yamamoto, claiming that they have not lost their pride despite being reigai. Also, Unohana and Isane confront Inaba at his headquarters, where he explains how he created these reigai. Isane suddenly turns on Unohana, revealing herself to be an impostor. Unohana's reigai then arrives and meets with her original.
325	9	"For the Sake of the Believers! Byakuya vs. Hitsugaya!"; Transliteration: "Shinzuru Mono no Tame ni! Byakuya tai Hitsugaya!" (Japanese: 信ずるものの為に！白哉vs日番谷！)	Junya Koshiba	Kento Shimoyama	Tomomi Ishikawa	June 7, 2011	December 1, 2013
Unohana and her imposter engage in conflict using kido attacks, with Unohana escaping. Ukitake and Kyōraku's reigai are unable to defeat Yamamoto, who criticizes their claim that they retain their pride. Unohana's reigai arrives and heals their wounds, revealing their strategy was to exhaust Yamamoto. Elsewhere in the Seireitei, Byakuya is stopped by the Hitsugaya's reigai, and the two unleash their bankai in a brief battle. Byakuya asks why someone would fight for Inaba, and Histugaya's reigai claims that he wants to protect someone, whom the original does not have the power to do so. Byakuya criticizes his motives and eventually manages to defeat him, though narrowly escaping Hitsugaya's Hyōten Hyakkasō. Back in the living world, Ichigo asks Urahara to send him to the Soul Society. He is advised not to go due to his declining spiritual energy. However, Nozomi steps up and reveals a type of healing kido that restores some of Ichigo's lost spiritual energy. He then proceeds with heading to the Soul Society, where Inaba meets with the unresponsive figure resembling Nozomi, claiming Nozomi will return.
326	10	"The Two Hinamori, Hitsugaya's Resolution"; Transliteration: "Futari no Hinamori, Hitsugaya no Kakugo" (Japanese: ふたりの雛森、日番谷の覚悟)	Directed by : Kazuo Nogami; Storyboarded by : Minoru Murao	Kazuyuki Fudeyasu	Yukari Takeuchi, Mitsuki Kosaka & Yūri Ichinose	June 14, 2011	January 5, 2014
Ichigo, entering through the Dangai, reaches the Soul Society, where he later encounters Inaba. After Byakuya kills the fake Hitsugaya, he moves forward, where he encounters his own reigai. While in a bamboo forest, Kenpachi is attacked by Suì-Fēng's reigai, but he easily defeats her squad members. Hitsugaya is confronted by fake Momo Hinamori, but he cannot being himself to kill her, despite knowing she is an imposter. The real Momo seems to appear and attacks her reigai, but both are revealed to be reigai, after tricking him into saving one of them, and they cut him down. Yoruichi then appears and defeats both of the reigai, saving Hitsugaya. Meanwhile, Suì-Fēng's reigai attacks Kenpachi, but Komamura interrupts and challenges her. Inaba, while attacking Ichigo, explains that his lack of purity makes him an erasable anomaly. Inaba then uses his zanpakutō to trap Ichigo in the Dangai.
327	11	"Pride of the Kuchiki Family! Byakuya vs. Byakuya!"; Transliteration: "Kuchiki-ke no Hokori! Byakuya tai Byakuya!" (Japanese: 朽木家の誇り！白哉vs白哉！)	Minoru Yamaoka	Masahiro Okubo	Shinichi Kurita	June 21, 2011	January 12, 2014
Byakuya confronts his false counterpart, originally struggling until he releases his bankai. Meanwhile, Komamura is having difficulty dealing with Suì-Fēng's reigai, whose speed and abilities seem to outmatch his. In a desperate final attempt, both of them clash with their bankai, and the battle ends in a draw. Elsewhere, a frustrated Yamamato releases a powerful wall of fire, seemingly engulfing the imposters that were challenging him. In the world of the living, Ichigo's friends express concern when Urahara tells them he cannot detect Ichigo's spiritual pressure.
328	12	"Defeat Kagerōza! Shinigami in All-Out War!"; Transliteration: "Kagerōza o Taose! Shinigami, Sōryokusen!" (Japanese: 影狼佐を倒せ！死神、総力戦！)	Directed by : Kazunori Mizuno; Storyboarded by : Hiroki Takagi & Yasuto Nishikata	Kento Shimoyama	Masahiko Komino	June 28, 2011	January 19, 2014
Hitsugaya and Kenpachi arrive at Inaba's base of operations. They engage him in combat, and Inaba reveals his zanpakutō can record attacks in the Dangai and fire them back at the opponent. As Inaba gains the upper hand, Yoruichi and the captains arrive, aside from Komamura, Unahana, Yamamoto and Mayuri. Elsewhere, Ichigo is rescued in the Dangai by a mysterious figure. Inaba summons the remaining reigai, and a brawl between the originals and the fakes ensues. At first, Yoruichi and the captains are able to overpower Inaba and his forces. However, when they lose the upper hand, a seemingly false Mayuri slashes Inaba, revealing he switched places with the imposter.
329	13	"The Forbidden Research...Nozomi's Hidden Secret!"; Transliteration: "Kindan no Kenkyū...Nozomi ni Kakusareta Himitsu!" (Japanese: 禁断の研究…望実に隠された秘密！)	Directed by : Yasuto Nishikata; Storyboarded by : Noriyuki Abe, Yasuto Nishikata & Hiroki Takagi	Kento Shimoyama	Tomomi Umemura	July 5, 2011	January 26, 2014
Ichigo awakens at the Urahara Shop, mystified as to how he was rescued. Urahara tells him that there are several ways to escape the kōryū but none to escape the Kōtotsu, so it is unknown how Ichigo escaped. Elsewhere, Mayuri uses his zanpakutō to drug Inaba, which slows down his ability to think. However, Isaba then summons Isane's reigai and attacks her. At the Urahara Shop, Rukia then explains Project Spearhead to the rest of the group in which modified souls were used. Inaba then takes the soul candy from the reigai and swallows it, resulting with Inaba being rejected from his body and the reigai taking the effects of the drug. Inaba, revealing his backstory as the one who created modified souls, then resurrects most of the defeated reigai, unleashing their true strength. Nozomi admits she was the first modified soul.
330	14	"I Want to Live...! Nozomi's Zanpakutō"; Transliteration: "Ikitai...! Nozomi no Zanpakutō" (Japanese: 生きたい…！望実の斬魄刀)	Directed by : Mitsutaka Noshitani; Storyboarded by : Tetsuhito Saito	Kento Shimoyama	Natsuko Suzuki & Makoto Shimojima	July 12, 2011	February 2, 2014
Renji reports to Yamamoto and informs him that the captains involved in the brawl with Inaba have not been heard from. Yamamoto then states that only Ichigo, Rukia, Renji, Ikkaku and Yumichika are prepared for battle. Yamamoto then speculates several hollows may have gathered due to the spiritual disturbance. Nozomi stays at Ichigo's house for the time being, and Kon has been feeling really depressed lately because of what Nozomi admitted. Ichigo and Rukia have been handling many hollows during this, while their friends share their concern for Kon and keep Nozomi company. That night, while Ichigo is sleeping, Nozomi leaves the house and goes for a walk. However, she is then attacked by a hollow, and a confident Kon arrives to defend her. After the hollow easily deals with them both, Nozomi's frustration releases a bout of spiritual pressure, and she regains her Soul Reaper abilities, defeating the hollow.
331	15	"For the Sake of Fighting! The Awakened Nozomi!"; Transliteration: "Tatakau Tame ni! Mezame yo Nozomi!" (Japanese: 戦うために！目覚めよ望実！)	Directed by : Akane Inoue; Storyboarded by : Junya Koshiba	Masahiro Okubo	Minoru Morita & Shuji Maruyama	July 19, 2011	February 9, 2014
After regaining Soul Reaper abilities, Nozomi decides that she wants to help defeat Inaba, but she has yet to remember the name and power of her zanpakutō. Ichigo, Rukia, Uryū and Chad decide to help Nozomi awaken her dormant powers through the same rigorous training that Ichigo underwent to awaken his. Meanwhile, Inaba orders the fakes of Byakuya, Hitsugaya, Kenpachi and Komamura to infiltrate the human world, but the four fall into a trap set by Urahara, who separates them during their travel through the Dangai. When the four fakes arrive in various areas, Ikkaku battles Kenpachi's reigai, while some of the lieutenants deal with the rest, all to buy more time for Nozomi. Taking advice from Yumichika to not hold back on her training, Ichigo throws a Getsuga Tenshō at Nozomi, allowing her to finally remember the name of her zanpakutō, Arazome Shigure, which seemingly swallows up all of Ichigo's spiritual pressure. Ikkaku looks like he is about to be delivered the finishing blow by Kenpachi's reigai, but Nozomi arrives and seemingly obliterates Kenpachi's reigai with her zanpakutō.
332	16	"The Most Evil Reigai, Appearing in the Real World!"; Transliteration: "Saikyo no Reigai, Gense ni Arawaru!" (Japanese: 最凶の霊骸、現世に現る！)	Directed by : Kazunobu Shimizu; Storyboarded by : Hideyo Yamamoto	Masahiro Okubo	Manabu Kurihara	July 26, 2011	February 16, 2014
Hisagi and Kira take on Hitsugaya's reigai, while Rangiku and Tetsuzaemon Iba fight Komamura's reigai. Renji and Rukia face Byakuya's reigai, covering for Ōmaeda after seemingly being defeated. When Kenpachi's reigai reappears to fight Nozomi, Yumichika faces him to avenge his fallen comrade, while Ichigo and Nozomi tend to Ikkaku's wounds. An unsatisfied Nozomi wants to help out in the ongoing battles, but all of the lieutenants tell her to get out of the way and go to safety. The lieutenants are soon cut down or are at their limits against the four false captains. Kenpachi challenges Ichigo to a match, but when Hitsugaya eagerly joins in and attacks Nozomi, she then deals a considerable amount of damage to him in one shot. Byakuya's reigai, realizing the power of her zanpakutō, tries to bind her to keep her from using it, but Uryū manages to save her. After witnessing Nozomi absorb an attack from his bow, Ginrei Kojaku, Uryū deduces that her zanpakutō can absorb anything with spiritual pressure. Having no other choice but to rely on her, Ichigo, Uryū, Chad and the remaining lieutenants all direct their spiritual pressure at Nozomi, which she redirects at the four false captains. Byakuya's reigai survives the attack, but Yamamoto suddenly appears and defeats him.
333	17	"Destroy Nozomi?! Genryusai's Decision!"; Transliteration: "Nozomi o Kesu!? Genryūsai no Ketsudan!" (Japanese: 望実を消す!? 元柳斎の決断！)	Directed by : Kazuo Nogami; Storyboarded by : Tetsuhito Saito	Kazuyuki Fudeyasu	Yukari Takeuchi	August 2, 2011	February 23, 2014
Yamamoto believes Nozomi is unimportant to him, due to the fact that she is a modified soul. Ichigo tells Uryū and Chad to bring the injured lieutenants to Orihime to be healed. Ukitake and Kyōraku's reigai suddenly appear in the living world and are back for a rematch with Yamamoto, but Ichigo and Nozomi take over for now and spar with the two. Ichigo later has to cover for Nozomi when she is defeated, but even then he barely evades the attacks of Ukitake and Kyōraku's reigai. Yamamoto, distracted at this, is soon immobilized by the Unohara's reigai, but as the original Unohara stops her, he is able to break the seal with his spiritual pressure. When Yamamoto is about to be attacked by the three reigai, Inaba arrives and commands them to stop, as he wants to be the one to battle Yamamoto. Nozomi offers to be a decoy to prevent Inaba from copying Yamamoto's techniques. Inaba avoids crossing swords with Nozomi, knowing full well of her abilities, but Nozomi pulls out a surprise attack, having already absorbed Yamamoto's spiritual pressure. Yamamoto attacks Inaba with his flames, as this was a diversion for Ichigo to use his Getsuga Tenshō on Inaba. However, Ichigo collapses and Nozomi goes to catch him. Inaba, revealed to still be alive, was able to copy the abilities of Nozomi, absorbing both Yamamoto and Ichigo's attacks. As Inaba then uses this to finish Yamamoto off, Nozomi appears before the blast in an attempt to absorb the attack.
334	18	"The Depleting Reiatsu! Ichigo, Death Struggle of the Soul!"; Transliteration: "Ushinawareru Reiatsu! Ichigo, Tamashii no Shitō!" (Japanese: 失われる霊圧！一護、魂の死闘！)	Kazunori Mizuno	Kazuyuki Fudeyasu	Masaya Ōnishi & Tomomi Umemura	August 9, 2011	March 2, 2014
Nozomi's zanpakutō breaks in the midst of trying to protect Yamamoto from Inaba's attack. Ichigo and Kon try to save Nozomi from being taken away, but Inaba reveals that he and Nozomi were created by the same spirit particles of another Soul Reaper. He defeats Ichigo, Rukia and Renji, while Nozomi manages to run away with Kon in tow. Nozomi sadly binds Kon to a rock, running away without him. Ichigo is seen still conscious and struggling to catch up with Nozomi. When Inaba finds Nozomi, he falls due to a loose rock on a slope. Ichigo finally catches up and defeats Inaba with a Getsuga Tenshō, only to discover that it was a clone that Inaba created. Inaba knocks Ichigo out in one swipe, passes Nozomi out and proceeds to leave the world of the living with her. Kon, still bound to a rock tries to follow them, but he is too late. He is seen crying out for Nozomi, while Ichigo's uniform turns white as a result of his depleting spiritual energy.
335	19	"Hiding in the Dangai? Another Ichigo?!"; Transliteration: "Dangai ni Senpuku? Mō Hitori no Ichigo!?" (Japanese: 断界に潜伏？もう一人の一護!?)	Yuzuru Tachikawa	Kento Shimoyama	Shinichi Kurita	August 16, 2011	March 9, 2014
Following his defeat by Inaba, Ichigo has lost his Soul Reaper powers. Still determined to save Nozomi, Ichigo and his friends gather at the Urahara Shop to come up with a rescue plan. Urahara comes up with a risky plan that involves Ichigo going in the Dangai and being swallowed by the Kōtotsu to retrieve a sample of his Soul Reaper powers, since he was swallowed before. The plan works and Ichigo gets out of the Kōtotsu. When he meets up with everyone, he states that he saw another one of himself when he was inside the Kōtotsu, leading Urahara to conclude that Ichigo saved himself when he was first swallowed, since there is no time in the Kōtotsu.
336	20	"Pursue Kagerōza! Technological Development Department, Infiltration!"; Transliteration: "Kagerōza o Oe! Gijutsu Kaihatsukyoku, Sennyū!" (Japanese: 影狼佐を追え！技術開発局、潜入！)	Directed by : Yoshifumi Sueda; Storyboarded by : Noriyuki Abe & Yoshifumi Sueda	Kento Shimoyama	Masahiko Komino	August 23, 2011	March 16, 2014
Inside the Dangai, Rukia and the others act as decoys to draw away the attention of the reigai while Ichigo, Urahara and Kon break into the Seireitei. As they search for Inaba's laboratory, Urahara makes an attempt to restore Ichigo's lost powers by creating a soul candy, but is discovered by Nanao and Nemu's reigai. At the last minute before an explosion, Ichigo breaks the glass containing the soul candy and consumes it. However, as stated by Urahara, the candy was incomplete, making both his Soul Reaper and hollow powers unbalanced. While escaping, the three are ambushed by the false captains, but are saved when Yoruichi and the originals appear, ready to fight.
337	21	"The Developer of the Modified Souls"; Transliteration: "Kaizō Konpaku no Kaihatsusha" (Japanese: 改造魂魄の開発者)	Directed by : Mitsutaka Noshitani; Storyboarded by : Hiroki Takagi	Kazuyuki Fudeyasu	Natsuko Suzuki & Gi Nam Kim	August 30, 2011	March 23, 2014
The captains, thought to have fallen in battle, return to fight the reigai. Meanwhile, Ichigo powers continue to grow unstable, forcing him to rest for the time being, while Urahara and Kon continue their investigation on Inaba. Urahara and Kon later find out about Ōko Yushima, the Soul Reaper who extracted all of his spirit particles and separating them into two modified souls, them being Nozomi and Inaba. When visiting Yushima's cell in the Nest of Maggots, they get attacked by Suì-Fēng and Ōmaeda's reigai, but are later defeated by Urahara. The two visit Yushima's cell, only to find him unresponsive, leading Urahara to conclude that Yushima will never gain consciousness. Meanwhile, Ichigo's hollowfied form finally takes over and escapes the building he was in.
338	22	"Kon's Thoughts, Nozomi's Thoughts"; Transliteration: "Kon no Omoi, Nozomi no Omoi" (Japanese: コンの想い、望実の想い)	Directed by : Akane Inoue; Storyboarded by : Junya Koshiba	Kazuyuki Fudeyasu	Makoto Koga, Shuji Maruyama & Akemi Kobayashi	September 6, 2011	March 30, 2014
Urahara and Kon head to the location where Inaba's other laboratory might be, only to be halted by Urahara's reigai. As Urahara battles his counterpart, Kon dashes down into the laboratory, where he promptly tries to awaken Nozomi inside her capsule. She does awaken and insists that Kon escape at first, but after seeing his persistence and his devotion of trying to save her, being bound by friendship, she tries to help Kon restore Ichigo's spiritual energy. Before Ichigo's soul candy can be created, Nemu's reigai appears and stops the transfer. Immediately afterwards, the fusion process between Nozomi and Inaba is completed. Ichigo's hollowfied form defeats the eighth division members, but when he is about to destroy Nanao's reigai, the fused Yushima appears before him.
339	23	"Protect Ichigo! The Bonds of Friends!"; Transliteration: "Ichigo o Mamore! Nakama-tachi no Kizuna!" (Japanese: 一護を護れ！仲間たちの絆！)	Directed by : Masaya Sasaki; Storyboarded by : Tetsuhito Saito	Masahiro Okubo	Manabu Kurihara & Kenji Hattori	September 13, 2011	April 6, 2014
Yushima, showing no interest in fighting Ichigo's hollowfied form, tries to walk away, but the mindless hollowfied creature continues to pursue him, leading them both to clash on Sōkyoku Hill. The captains and their reigai counterparts are finally joined by their lieutenants, who help them in the battle. Rukia, Renji, Orihime, Uryū and Chad arrive on Sōkyoku Hill and all try to stop Yushima, but the combined powers of Nozomi and Inaba prove to be too much for them. Yushima reveals the true nature of his zanpakutō, Sumitsukigasa, and defeats everyone, but before he can finish them off, Ichigo jumps in front of Rukia to take an attack that was meant for her.
340	24	"Reigai vs. Original, the Fierce Battle for Gambled Pride!"; Transliteration: "Reigai tai Genshu, Hokori o Kaketa Gekitō!" (Japanese: 霊骸vs原種、誇りを賭けた激闘！)	Directed by : Kazuo Nogami; Storyboarded by : Yasuto Nishikata	Kento Shimoyama	Yukari Takeuchi, Mitsuki Kosaka & Chiaki Abe	September 20, 2011	April 13, 2014
When Yushima stabs Ichigo with his zanpakutō, Ichigo goes into Yushima's consciousness and sees an image of Nozomi, who calls out for him, causing his hollwfied form to break apart and losing all his powers again. Ichigo is left to watch as his friends attempt to overpower Yushima, but Yushima finds to a way to break through whatever they try to attack him with. Yushima has Nemu's reigai bring him more fusion stabilizer, but when she arrives, she unexpectedly kicks him backward. It is revealed that Kon was helped by Urahara and Mayuri by placing his soul candy into that of Nemu's reigai. Kon gives Ichigo a complete soul candy, which restores his powers. He prepares to unleash his bankai against Yushima. Meanwhile, Byakuya has deduced that the reigai do not sacrifice themselves to attack the originals when they are all together, as it goes against what they believe in. The originals join forces against the reigai to protect the Soul Society.
341	25	"Invading Army Arc, Final Conclusion!"; Transliteration: "Shingun-hen, Saishū Ketchaku!" (Japanese: 侵軍篇、最終決着！)	Yuzuru Tachikawa	Kento Shimoyama	Hiroaki Imaki	September 27, 2011	April 20, 2014
Ichigo successfully unleashes his bankai and fights against Yushima, while the captains and lieutenants fight the reigai. With the assistance of his friends, Ichigo is able to fire a hollowfied Getsuga Tenshō, which Yushima is unable to absorb because of his inability to absorb hollow spiritual pressure. Ichigo will have to attack Yushima's saketsu, his binding soul chain, to destroy his hakusui, the source of his powers. As Yushima strikes at Ichigo, he catches his zanpakutō and fires a huge hollowfied Getsuga Tenshō, which causes great damage to Yushima and the area. Nozomi's consciousness appears for a moment and asks to be killed, but Yushima takes complete control and unleashes a giant structure that absorbs the spirit particles from the Soul Society. Being surrounded by his structure and Ichigo out of the way, Nozomi regains control and creates a sword to slice Yushima's saketsu. The reigai react shockingly to Yushima's attack and reveal that their motive was to protect the Soul Society in their own way. The reigai proceed to attack the structure at the cost of their own lives, causing a huge explosion. Ichigo deactivates his bankai and has one last clash with an enraged Yushima before breaking the fusion. Nozomi and Inaba reappear once again, and Inaba begins to question his thoughts to Nozomi before fading away. Nozomi reunites with Kon and the rest of her friends, but she starts fades away herself. Nozomi says a heartwarming goodbye to Kon and fades away.
342	26	"Thank You"; Transliteration: "Arigatō" (Japanese: ありがとう)	Directed by : Ogura Shirakawa; Storyboarded by : Junya Koshiba	Masahiro Okubo	Masashi Kudo	October 4, 2011	April 27, 2014
Ichigo has been struggling against hollows, due to gradually losing his temporarily restored powers, but is saved by Rukia and Uryū, who tell him to rest from dealing with hollows. It is shown that Ukitake contacted Rukia to prevent Ichigo from fighting hollows. The next day, Ichigo takes Rukia to an ice skating rink with their friends. At night, fireworks from a nearby amusement park begin to shoot up in the sky, ending the day on a happy note. A massive hollow is sensed nearby when Ichigo and Rukia are heading home, but Rukia tries to save Ichigo from facing it, telling him that she would fight in his place if she has to, seeing him as a good friend. Rukia freezes the hollow's legs, and Ichigo fires his last Getsuga Tenshō and destroys it. An exhausted Ichigo was well aware that Rukia was instructed to prevent Ichigo from fighting hollows and to give him rest, but he knows that he will remain the same way as he has been before. Ichigo wakes up in his room, surrounded by his friends. He goes outside and takes note of his disappearing powers, unable to sense spirits anymore. He says goodbye as Rukia's presence begins to fade away and he thanks her after she fully disappears.

== Home media release ==
=== Japanese ===
Gotei 13 Invading Army arc
Vol.	Release date	Episodes
1	February 22, 2012	317–321
2	March 21, 2012	322–325
3	April 25, 2012	326–329
4	May 23, 2012	330–333
5	June 27, 2012	334–337
6	July 25, 2012	338–342

=== English ===
Viz Media (Region 1)
Vol.	Release date	Episodes
23	December 16, 2014	317–329
24	March 17, 2015	330–342

Manga Entertainment (Region 2)
Series	Release Date		Episodes	Arc
15	May 25, 2015 (Part 1)	December 28, 2015 (Complete)	317–329	The Invading Army
15	June 29, 2015 (Part 2)	December 28, 2015 (Complete)	330–342	The Invading Army

Madman Entertainment (Region 4)
Collection	Release date	Episodes
24	March 11, 2015	317–329
25	May 20, 2015	330–342
