= Across the Border =

Across the Border may refer to:

- "Across the Border" (song), a 2010 song by Vivid
- "Across the Border", a song by Electric Light Orchestra, from the album Out of the Blue
- "Across the Border", a song by Bruce Springsteen from his 1995 album The Ghost of Tom Joad
- Across the Border (film), a 1922 western film starring Guinn "Big Boy" Williams
- The alternative title of the 1938 Canadian film Special Inspector
- Across the Border (band), German folk-punk band

== See also ==
- Across the Borders, a 1997 live album by Battlefield Band
