= "Yume" ~Mugen no Kanata~ =

Single by ViViD

""Yume" ~Mugen no Kanata"

Single by ViViD
- Released: January 19, 2011
- Genre: Rock
- Label: Epic Records
- Songwriters: Hideyuki Harasawa, Akihide Sakai

ViViD singles chronology
"Precious" (2010)	""Yume" ~Mugen no Kanata" (2011)	"Blue" (2011)

Alternate covers
- Limited Edition A Cover

Alternative cover
- Limited Edition B Cover

""Yume" ~Mugen no Kanata~" is the major debut single and fifth overall single released by ViViD, release under Sony Music Entertainment's sub-label EPIC Records. The single was released in three different versions: two limited CD+DVD editions (A+B) and a regular CD only edition. Both limited editions come with the title song's PV; limited edition A contains three live performances taken from their August 8th, 2010 live show at Shibuya-AX, while limited edition B comes with a live performance of "Take-off". The regular edition comes with another B-side song, titled "risk". The title track was used as an ending theme song for the anime "Level E". The single reached #6 on the Oricon weekly charts, where it charted for eight weeks.

== Track listing ==
regular edition CD – CD track list
No.	Title	Length
1.	""Yume" ~Mugen no Kanata~" (「夢」～ムゲンノカナタ～; "Dreams" ~Beyond the Fantasy~)
2.	"Rem"
3.	"risk"

Limited edition CD+DVD – CD track list
No.	Title	Length
1.	""Yume" ~Mugen no Kanata~"
2.	"Rem"

Limited edition A CD+DVD – DVD track list
No.	Title	Length
1.	""Yume" ~Mugen no Kanata~" (music video)
2.	"Dear" (live 8/8 Shibuya-AX live video)
3.	"Across the Border" (live 8/8 Shibuya-AX live video)
4.	"Precious" (live 8/8 Shibuya-AX live video)

Limited edition B CD+DVD - DVD track list
No.	Title	Length
1.	""Yume" ~Mugen no Kanata~" (music video)
2.	"Take-off" (document music video)
3.	"Take-off" (live 8/8 Shibuya-AX live video)
