= List of Bleach chapters (424–686) =

Cover of the 49th tankōbon volume, released in Japan by Shueisha on April 21, 2011

The chapters 424–686 of the Bleach manga series, written and illustrated by Tite Kubo, comprise two story arcs: the "Lost Agent arc" (死神代行消失篇, Shinigami Daikō Shōshitsu hen) and the "Thousand-Year Blood War arc" (千年血戦篇, Chitose Kessen Hen). The plot follows the Substitute Soul Reaper Ichigo Kurosaki who is in charge of slaying Hollows, evil spirits that attack people. In these chapters, Ichigo and his friends first face Xcution, a gang of Fullbringers—supernaturally aware humans whose leader Ginjo Kujo was his predecessor as Substitute Soul Reaper. After that, they must fight an army of Quincies—humans who can fight Hollows—known as the Wandenreich.

Bleach was published in individual chapters by Shueisha in Weekly Shōnen Jump magazine and was later collected in tankōbon (book) format. The "Lost Agent arc", going through volumes 49–54, was serialized between November 2010, and January 16, 2012. The following arc, covering volumes 55–74, was released from February 13, 2012, to August 22, 2016. Volume 49 was released on April 21, 2011, while the last volume was published on November 4, 2016.

An anime adaptation, produced by Studio Pierrot and TV Tokyo, was broadcast by TV Tokyo. The "Lost Agent" part was adapted into the series' 24-episode season 16, which started on October 11, 2011, and finished on March 27, 2012. The sixteenth season was its last before the anime entered a ten year hiatus.

North American licensee Viz Media serialized the individual chapters in Shonen Jump from its November 2007 to April 2012 issues. The series moved to the digital anthology Weekly Shonen Jump Alpha in January 2012 and Viz Media released it digitally as Shueisha published new chapters in Japan. Viz Media released the 49th volume October 2, 2012; the 74th and last was released on October 2, 2018. The company also re-released the series under the label of "3-in-1 Edition"; the book containing volume 49 was released on November 1, 2016, and the last was volume 25 (with original volumes 73 and 74), released on March 5, 2019.

== Volumes ==
No.	Title	Original release date	English release date
49	The Lost Agent	April 21, 2011; 978-4-08-870186-8	October 18, 2012; 978-1-4215-4302-4
424. "The Lost Agent"; 425. "A Day Without Melodies"; 426. "The Starter 2"; 427. "A Delicious Dissonance"; 428. "The Known"; 429. "Welcome to our Execution"; 430. "Welcome to our Execution 2"; 431. "Welcome to our Execution 3"; 432. "The Soul Pantheism"
Seventeen months after the defeat of Sousuke Aizen (the summer of 2003), and at the cost of his Soul Reaper powers, Ichigo Kurosaki has been living in peace as a third year high school student and working part time for Ikumi Unagiya. By chance, having met him while retrieving a stolen bag, Ichigo meets a client who requests an investigation on Isshin Kurosaki. Declining while intrigued that the figure reveals his spiritual aware younger sister Karin has been visiting Kisuke Urahara. The clone introduces himself as Kūgo Ginjō and gives Ichigo a business card while warning him to contact him before something bad happens to his loved ones. Ichigo later learns that Uryū, Ryūken Ishida sending the youth home while warning Orihime to be careful as the assailant is a human with spiritual powers like herself and Chad. The next day, Ichigo saves his friends Keigo Asano and Mizuiro Kojima from Moe Shishigawara, the thief that Ichigo encounter yesterday. Ichigo then encounters Shishigawara's boss who was the last person Uryū saw before being attacked. The figure flees when Ryūken arrives, telling Ichigo to call an ambulance. Ichigo, realizing he is being excluded from information due to his lack of powers, decides to contact Ginjō. Soon after, Ichigo is introduced to Xcution group whose members possess the ability dubbed as Fullbring, which allows them to manipulate the souls of any physical matter.
50	The Six Fullbringers	June 3, 2011; 978-4-08-870219-3	November 6, 2012; 978-1-4215-4303-1
433. "The Six Fullbringers"; 434. "Berry in the Box"; 435. "Panic at the Dollhouse"; 436. "The Time Discipline"; 437. "Manji Break" (Note: The chapter is titled "Swastika Break" in the Japanese release.); 438. "Knuckle Down"; 439. "Keen Marker"; 440. "Mute Friendship"; 441. "Spotlight Brocken"
Ginjō explains to Ichigo that Fullbringers' powers come from the residual spiritual energy from hollows who attacked pregnant mothers and that their powers are greater when used on an object they cherish. Chad, who had been missing, appears before Ichigo and reveals himself to be a Fullbringer. Ginjō explains that he and the other members Xcution like restore Ichigo's Soul Reaper powers in order to rid themselves of their Fullbring abilities. Though declines at first, Ichigo accepts to protect his friends and family. Next day, Ichigo begins how to use the Fullbring abilities by being placed in a dollhouse by Riruka Dokugamine, where he has to defeat an aggressive soul-infused pig plushie under a time limit set by Giriko Kutsuzawa. From the ordeal, Ichigo learns to use his combat pass as the focal item to materialize his Fullbring. Meanwhile, Orihime is confronted by Shishigawara then by the punk's boss, who introduces himself as Shūkurō Tsukishima before seemingly stabbing her. Confiding to Chad about Tsukishima, Orihime hides what she perceives to be the truth from Ichigo as he returns to Xcution's headquarters to hone his Fullbring by facing Xcution's Jackie Tristan.
51	Love Me Bitterly Loth Me Sweetly	August 4, 2011; 978-4-08-870272-8	November 18, 2012; 978-1-4215-4304-8
442. "Battlefield Shallows, Otherfield Abyss"; 443. "Dirty Boots Dangers"; 444. "The Rising"; 445. "The Dark Beat"; 446. "The Dark Beat 2"; 447. "Load"; 448. "Loading To Lie"; 449. "Not Be a Drug"; 450. "Blind Solitude"
While overpowered at first by Jackie's Fullbring, Ichigo is able to activate a power of Fullbring known as Bringer Light to gain the advantage before he starts to lose control over his powers. It is then that Tsukishima attacks Xcution to kill Ichigo, destroying the fish tank containing Ichigo and Jackie. Luckily, Ichigo saves himself and Jackie while having entered the next stage of his Fullbring. The battle is taken outside when Chad attacks Tsukishima before he reveals he was the one who attacked Uryū and Orihime. This causes Ichigo to battle Tsukishima before being overpowered with Ginjō holding Tsukishima off. Ichigo is digitally sealed by Yukio Hans Vorarlberna's Fullbring so Chad and Xcution can drive Tsukishima off. The group move to a new base of operations where they explain to Ichigo that Tsukishima was originally a member of their group who gone rogue and whose Fullbring allows him to alter peoples' memories. Ichigo then resumes his training through Yukio's Fullbring as he spars against Ginjō with Orihime brought in to heal him.
52	End of Bond	October 4, 2011; 978-4-08-870291-9	December 4, 2012; 978-1-4215-4305-5
451. "Welcome to Our Execution 4"; 452. "Erosion/Implosion"; 453. "Mute Your Breathe Friendship"; 454. "Sheathebreaker"; 455. "End of the Bond 1"; 456. "End of the Bond 2"; 457. "End of the Bond 3"; 458. "End of All Bonds"; 459. "Death & Strawberry 2"
Ichigo fully manifests his Fullbring during his match against Ginjō, noticing that something is off with his opponent. After Ichigo puts the finishing touches on his complete Fullbring, Ginjō tells him to go home to see his sisters. Not long after that, Ichigo discovers that Tsukishima had inserted his presence in the past of all of his family and friends. After learning that even the other members of Xcution have been effected by Tsukishima, Ichigo and Ginjō confront him at his mansion. But while dealing with both Chad and Orihime as they are under Tsukishima's spell, Ichigo witnesses Ginjō being stabbed. Though it seemed Ginjō is unaffected, Uryū reveals that Ginjō is the man who attacked him. Before Ichigo can react, Ginjō strikes him down and siphons his Fullbring. Explaining that Tsukishima only restored his memory and those of their fellow Fullbringers, Ginjō reveals that they had arranged the recent events as part of a scheme to take Ichigo's Fullbring. Soon after, a distraught Ichigo is stabbed from behind by Rukia and is transformed into Soul Reaper.
53	The Deathberry Returns 2	December 2, 2011; 978-4-08-870291-9	December 26, 2012; 978-1-4215-4949-1
460. "Deathberry Returns 2"; 461. "Come Around Our Turn"; 462. "Why Me Sad"; 463. "Extreme Divider"; 464. "Quiet Chamber, Noisy Heart"; 465. "Bad Blood Exhaust"; 466. "Screaming Invader"; 467. "Lucky Men"; 468. "Raid as a Blade"; 469. "Rag Lag Rumble"
After being stabbed by Rukia, who reveals the sword was created by Urahara and was infused with energies from the Thirteen Court Guard Squads, Ichigo regains his Soul Reaper powers as Byakuya, Renji, Kenpachi, Ikkaku, and Hitsugaya appear. It is then that Ginjō is revealed to be the first Substitute Soul Reaper as Ichigo overpowers him. After Chad and Orihime were knocked out for their safety by Urahara and Isshin, Ginjō gives the other Xcution members Ichigo's fullbring to increase their powers. Yukio proceeds to separate everyone in different arenas while Ikkaku knocks Shishigawara out with a headbutt. In their respective battles, Kenpachi kills Giriko with single slash while Renji defeats Jackie before she sacrifices herself to ensure his safety. As Hitsugaya outwits Yukio to cancel his ability, Byakuya engages Tsukishima while Rukia begins her battle against Riruka.
54	Goodbye to Our Xcution	March 2, 2012; 978-4-08-870386-2	January 1, 2013; 978-1-4215-5138-8
470. "Pray for Predators"; 471. "Pray for Predators 2"; 472. "Razoredge Requiem"; 473. "Enemies in the Dark"; 474. "BeLIEve"; 475. "Shades of the Bond"; 476. "The Lost"; 477. "The Lost 2"; 478. "The Lost 3"; 479. "Goodbye to Our Xcution"
After placing Rukia's soul in a doll body, Riruka proceeds to explain the past of the Xcution members to her opponent before ending their fight by using a special ability from her Fullbring in order to vanish after Rukia is restored to normal. Meanwhile, after Tsukishima manages to inflict a serious injury, Byakuya manages to inflict a mortal wound on his Fullbringer opponent. Sensing Tsukishima's failing life while explaining his ally's death would restore everyone's altered memories, Ginjō reveals to Ichigo the truth behind the Soul Society being distrustful towards Substitute Soul Reapers. Ichigo admits knowing about the revelation yet still having trust in the Soul Society for aiding him in protecting his loved ones as he kills Ginjō in a final clash. After Riruka saves him from getting killed by a dying Tsukishima, Ichigo later requests that Genryūsai Shigekuni Yamamoto let him bury Ginjō's body in the World of the Living. Yamamoto agrees just as Ichigo states his intent to continue being a Substitute Soul Reaper.
55	The Blood Warfare	June 4, 2012; 978-4-08-870418-0	February 5, 2013; 978-1-4215-5236-1
480. "The Blood Warfare" (Note: When released in tankōbon 55, chapter 480 was renamed from "Final Arc - The Thousand-Year Blood War arc" to "The Blood Warfare".); 481. "The Tearing"; 482. "Bad Recognition"; 483. "KriegsErklärung"; 484. "The Buckbeard"; 485. "Foundation Stones"; 486. "The Crimson Cremation"; 487. "Breathe But Blind"; 488. "Bond Behind Blast"; 489. "March of the StarCross"
The Soul Society begins to notice that a large number of Hollows in the World of the living has been exterminated and that people in the Rukon have been disappearing. Meanwhile, while helping Karakura Town's new residential Soul Reaper, Ichigo encounters a strange arrancar named Ebern Asguiaro who attempts to steal Ichigo's Bankai before escaping. At the same time, Head Captain Yamamoto encounters a group of masked men who are of the Wandenreich and have come to tell him that the Soul Society will be destroyed in five days. The group also reveal to have fatally wounded the Head Captain's lieutenant Chōjirō Sasakibe who later died of his wounds. Asguiaro and the leader of the masked figures, another arrancar named Luders Friegen, are killed by Wandenreich's leader, Yhwach. As a funeral is held for Chōjirō, Ichigo encounters Nel and Pesche who reveal that Hueco Mundo, having been ruled by Harribel since Aizen's defeat, has been taken over by the Wandenreich with many arrancars including Dondochakka captured. Ichigo arrives to Hueco Mundo with Chad, Orihime, and Kisuke as they find Wandenreich's Quilge Opie fighting Harribel's Fracciónes, now known as the Tres Bestias. At the Soul Society, Mayuri confesses to having had the missing Rukon residents murdered to maintain the balance of soul and that the hollows' destruction is caused by Wandenreich, revealed to be Quincies whose leader is someone Yamamoto failed to kill. Meanwhile, informed on Ichigo being in Hueco Mundo, the Wandenreich's leader declares an assault on the Seireitei.
56	March of the StarCross	September 4, 2012; 978-4-08-870478-4	April 2, 2013; 978-1-4215-5476-1
490. "March of the StarCross 2"; 491. "Toden Engel"; 492. "Balancer's Justice"; 493. "Light of Happiness"; 494. "The Closing Chapter Part One"; 495. "Bleeding Guitar Blues"; 496. "Kill The Shadow"; 497. "Kill The Shadow 2"; 498. "The Dark Rescuer" (Note: When released in tankōbon 56, chapter 498 was renamed from "The Black Rescuer" to "The Dark Rescuer".); 499. "Rescuer in the Dark"
In Hueco Mundo, knowing his opponent is a Quincy, Ichigo has an advantage against Quilge while Kisuke and Pesche save Dondochakka. But Quilge reveals his Vollständig ability in response, overpowering Ichigo before the Tres Bestias sick a restituted Ayon on him. But Quilge stabs Emilou before using his "Sklaverei" technique to absorb Ayon. Meanwhile, the Soul Reapers prepare to defend the Seireitei before being caught guard. Captains Byakuya, Komamura, Hitsugaya and Suì-Fēng face Wandenreich's elite Sternritters, only to lose their Bankai to their Quincy opponents' medallions. Devastated and desperate, Soul Society contacts Ichigo for help. However, just as Ichigo makes his way to the Soul Society, Quilge traps him in a spiritual prison so he can only witness the slaughter.
57	Out of Bloom	December 4, 2012; 978-4-08-870516-3	July 2, 2013; 978-1-4215-5882-0
500. "Rescuer in the Deep Dark"; 501. "Hear. Fear. Here"; 502. "Falling Sakura" (散桜, San'ō); 503. "Wrath as a Lightning"; 504. "Beyond the Thunder" (雷鳴の彼方へ, Raimei no Kanata e); 505. "The Fire"; 506. "The Fire 2"; 507. "The Fire 3"; 508. "Like a Raging Fire" (烈火の如し, Rekka no Gotoshi); 509. "Tenchi Kaijin" (天地灰尽, Tenchi Kaijin)
In the Garganta, Ichigo struggles to escape from Quilge's prison as the Quincy reveals the letter designation of the Sternritters while revealing himself to be Sternritter "J". Quilge then turns his attention to Orihime and Chad before being killed by a mysterious man. At the Soul Society, as Byakuya is almost killed by Sternritter "F" Äs Nodt, Kenpachi slaughters two Sternritters, Sternriiter "R" Jerome Guizbatt and Sternritter "Q" Berenice Gabrielli and even Sternritter "Y" Loyd Lloyd. Meanwhile, Yamamoto kills Chōjirō's killer, Sternritter "O" Driscoll Berci. Yamamoto then confronts the Wandenreich's leader Yhwach, who had defeated Kenpachi. Yamamoto unleashes his Bankai "Zanka no Tachi" and kills Yhwach in a brutal battle, only to learn his opponent is not the real Yhwach.
58	The Fire	March 4, 2013; 978-4-08-870551-4	October 1, 2013; 978-1-4215-6135-6
510. "The Extinction"; 511. "Die Standing" (立ちて死すべし, Tachite Shisubeshi); 512. "The Stand Ablaze" (Note: When released in tankōbon 58, chapter 512 was renamed from "Everything but the Rain" to "The Stand Ablaze".); 513. "The Dark Moon Stroke"; 514. "Born in the Dark"; 515. "Relics"; 516. "The Squad Zero"; 517. "The Stairway to Heaven"; 518. "The Shooting Star Project (Zero Mix)"; 519. "Hot, Hot, Heat"; 520. "Killers Not Dead"
The person Yamamoto battled was actually Loyd's twin brother Sternritter "Y" Royd Lloyd as the real Yhwach was visiting Aizen in the underground prison beneath Squad One's barracks in an attempt to recruit him. Acting in haste, Yamamoto loses his Bankai to Yhwach who quickly cuts him down and obliterates the latter. Yhwach orders his right hand Sternritter "B" Jugram Hashwalth to pull their forces back as Ichigo finally arrived and makes a beeline towards Yhwach. But Ichigo is quickly defeated by Yhwach, who damages the Substitute Soul Reaper's Zanpakutō while leaving him with the revelation that Ichigo's fight with Quilge awoke a connection between them. After the Wandenreich flee and have left the battlefield, the Soul King's' Royal Guard, also known as Squad Zero, arrive and takes Ichigo, Rukia, Byakuya and Renji back to the Soul King's Palace. And even Ichigo's broken Zanpakutō in its bankai state, Tensa Zangetsu. Afterwards, the new Head-Captain Shunsui Kyōraku arranges for Kenpachi to fight Unohana, so that he can unlock his Zanpakutō's full power.
59	The Battle	June 4, 2013; 978-4-08-870662-7	February 4, 2014; 978-1-4215-6237-7
521. "A Piggy Party"; 522. "Love It"; 523. "Swords of Origin"; 524. "The Drop"; 525. "Edges"; 526. "The Battle"; 527. "Eliminate From Heaven"; 528. "Everything But the Rain"; 529. "Everything But the Rain Op.2. The Rudiments"; 530. "Everything But the Rain Op.3. Dark of the Moon"
After complete recovery at Tenjiro Kirinji's place, Ichigo and Renji arrive at the palace of Kirio Hikifune where they replenish their Reiatsu with her special food. Ichigo learns that each of Royal Guard members have been chosen by the Soul King because of the significant contributions to Soul Society like Kirio creating the ModSouls. Afterwards, Ichigo and Renji meet Ōetsu Nimaiya, the unpredictable creator of the Zanpakutō. Before repairing their blades, Nimaiya gives Ichigo and Renji the challenge to evade the nameless Zanpakutō known as Asauchi whose anger towards the two symbolizes the improper use of their Zanpakutō. Meanwhile, at the Muken, Kenpachi Zaraki and Unohana enter a dark, cavernous space where they would fight to the death. It would be revealed that Retsu Unohana was originally a blood thirsty sociopath known as Squad 11 Captain Yachiru Unohana, one of the founding members of the Thirteen Court Squads and whose title Kenpachi named himself after. Both excited while remembering their first battle years ago, the battle ends with Kenpachi killing Unohana while finally hearing his Zanpakutō. Back at the Soul King's Palace, Ichigo failed Nimaiya's test and is sent back to the World of the Living. Once Ichigo is gone, Renji admits that he knew Ichigo would fail Nimaiya's test because he is not a true Soul Reaper with Nimaiya believing Ichigo must learn of his roots. Meeting Ichigo there, Isshin decides that it is time to reveal the truth that he was Squad Ten Captain Isshin Shiba and how he met Masaki Kurosaki.
60	Everything But The Rain	August 2, 2013; 978-4-08-870782-2	April 1, 2014; 978-1-4215-6458-6
531. "Everything But the Rain Op.4. Dark of the Bleeding Moon"; 532. "Everything But the Rain Op.5. The White Noise"; 533. "Everything But the Rain Op.6. The Gravitation"; 534. "Everything But the Rain Op.7. Hole of Reproach"; 535. "Everything But the Rain Op.8. Defenders"; 536. "Everything But the Rain Op.9. June Truth"; 537. "Everything But the Rain Op.10. Prinz von Licht"; 538. "Standing On the Edge"; 539. "Prob-less, Progress"; 540. "The Sword Five"
Years before Ichigo was born, Isshin Shiba runs off to Karakura Town (without receiving orders or requesting permission) to investigate the presence of a hollow. Isshin would encounter the hollow, revealed to be creation of Aizen's named White, and that the creature has the same skills as a Soul reaper. The spirit pressure from the fight attracted the attention of Masaki Kurosaki, a pure-blood Quincy, as she comes to Isshin's aid. Though Masaki helps Isshin destroy White, she ended up being bitten by the hollow. The following day, confronted by Ryūken's mother over her transgression and nearly endangering the purity of the Quincy bloodline, Masaki collapses as a hole appears on her chest. Isshin learns of Masaki's condition upon returning to Karakura Town as he and Ryūken bring her to Urahara. Urahara reveals that Masaki is undergoing hollowfication and that a part of White got transmitted into Masaki's body and is consuming her soul. Though it is impossible to cure her, Urahara explains it can be treated with a vaccination made with an opposing force. However, Isshin must remain by Masaki's side in a specially made Gigai made from human souls so she can spend the way of her natural life as a human. Knowing he must relinquish being a Soul Reaper and remain trapped in the Gigai, Isshin abruptly accepts. Isshin concludes the story by revealing to Ichigo that he regained his Soul Reaper powers the day Masaki died. Isshin then explains that Masaki's death, along with Uryū's mother Kanae Katagiri, was caused by the propagator of the Quincies: Yhwach. Later, Ichigo is taken back to the Royal Palace under goes a new test where he chooses his own Asauchi that would be forged into a new Zanpakutō. As Nimaiya begins to forge, it is revealed that the entity known as "Hollow Ichigo" is both an offshoot of White and the True Zangetsu. Furthermore, the spirit known as "Old Man Zangetsu", reminiscent of a younger Yhwach, is actually the personification of Ichigo's Quincy powers. Meanwhile, as the Soul Reapers prepare for another assault by the Wandenreich, Yhwach welcomes Uryū to their side.
61	The Last 9 Days	December 4, 2013; 978-4-08-870818-8	August 5, 2014; 978-1-4215-7383-0
541. "The Blade and Me 2"; 542. "The Blade is Me"; 543. "Letters"; 544. "Walking With Watchers"; 545. "Blue Stripes"; 546. "The Last 9 Days"; 547. "Peace From Shadows"; 548. "The Thin Ice"; 549. "The StormBringer"; 550. "Blazing Bullets"
In his inner world, Ichigo confronts Zangetsu as he confirms Ōetsu Nimaiya's revelation. Answering ambiguously, Zangetsu explains he has been honest save his name. Zangetsu also adds that it was Hollow Ichigo that always came to Ichigo's aid while admitting he initially tried to stop Ichigo from becoming a Soul Reaper to keep him safe from even himself. But handing over Ichigo's True Zanpakutō so he can use his full power, Zangetsu explains he later decided to help the youth after seeing his determination. Though Zangetsu fades, Ichigo still accepts him as "Zangetsu" alongside his hollow. Once Nimaiya finishes forging the True Zanpakutō, Ichigo finds it had become a split True Shikai True Zangetsu. As the Soul Society prepare for war, the Sternritter are assembled before Yhwach as he announces Uryū will be his successor. Yhwach later confides to Uryū because he survived the Auswählen that claimed his mother nine years ago. The Wandenreich later make their move and stage the final attack which Yhwach explains to Uryū will be the end of the world. Haschwalth confronts Shunsui and Nanao Ise, while Mayuri engages Sternritter "D" Askin Nakk Le Vaar, Hitsugaya and Rangiku fight against Sternritter "H" Bazz-B, and Suì-Fēng and Ōmaeda are battling Sternritter "K" BG9.
62	Heart Of Wolf	March 4, 2014; 978-4-08-870850-8	November 4, 2014; 978-1-4215-7681-7
551. "The Burnt Offerings"; 552. "The Fundamental Virulence"; 553. "Frozen Cross"; 554. "Desperate Lights"; 555. "The Hero"; 556. "The Wolfsbane"; 557. "I Already Threw Away My Life" (命はとうに置いてきた, Inochi wa Tōni Oite Kita); 558. "The Heart of the Wolf" (狼の心臓, Ōkami no Shinzō); 559. "The Night Right"; 560. "Rages at Ringside"
As Nano creates a Kidō barrier to keep Haschwalth from advancing towards Shunsui, Hitsugaya finds himself overpowered by Bazz-B's fire attacks until Sternritter "I" Cang Du who fatally wounded Rangiku while intending to deliver the finishing blow on the young captain. Mayuri senses both this and Suì-Fēng losing her battle until Urahara arrives and convinces his former ward to help him develop Shin'eiyaku tablets that they give to all Soul Reaper captains that will temporary hollowfy them to regain their bankai. Though Hitsugaya defeats Cang, he collapses from his injuries before he could reach Rangiku. Elsewhere, Sternritter "E" Bambietta Basterbine faces Shinji before having her rematch against Komamura. During the fight, Komamura reveals that he used his werewolf clan's "Humanization Technique" to fight as a powerful immortal man and avenge Yamamoto at the cost of his heart. By using his new Bankai Dangai Jōe, Komamura defeats Bambietta but is unable to proceed as the humanization wears off and he transforms completely into a wolf before being found by Iba. Dying from her injuries Bambietta finds herself at the mercy of her fellow female Sternritters under Giselle Gewelle. As night time comes, the Sternritters fall back with Cang Du and BG9 executed for their failure. Meanwhile, as Rukia and Renji arrive to the Seireitei, Kensei Muguruma and Rōjūrō "Rose" Ōtoribashi face Sternritter "S" Mask de Masculine.
63	Hear, Fear, Here	May 2, 2014; 978-4-08-880055-4	February 3, 2015; 978-1-4215-7855-2
561. "The Villain"; 562. "The Villain 2"; 563. "Superstar Never Die"; 564. "Red Bristled Kings"; 565. "God Like You"; 566. "What is Your Fear?"; 567. "Dance With Snowwhite"; 568. "Hear. Fear. Here 2"; 569. "The White Haze"; 570. "Closer, Closer"
Mask manages to overwhelm both Kensei and Rose, and before he could deal a final blow, Renji arrives to take over the fight while Rukia gets the captains to safety. Though overpowered by Mask's attacks, revealing his fan James to be an extension of his Quincy power, Renji reveals the true form of his Bankai: "Sōō Zabimaru". With his new power, Renji quickly defeats Mask. Meanwhile, as Haschwalth explains to Uryū that all Quincies have a fragment of Yhwach's soul in them that return to him upon death, Rukia confronts Äs Nodt as morning comes. Though immune to his fear inducement powers at first as she uses the full powers of her Shikai, Rukia, Nodt activates Vollständig to use his Tatarforas to induce fear through sight. But Byakuya arrives and gives Rukia the confidence to finish the fight by using her new Bankai "Hakka no Togame". Elsewhere, Isane attempts to heal Kensei and Rose, as Yachiru returns with supplies she managed to scavenge. However, they are found by proclaimed Sternritter "V" Guenael Lee, who has the ability to erase his presence from his opponents' senses and memories.
64	Death in Vision	September 4, 2014; 978-4-08-880134-6	July 7, 2015; 978-1-4215-7973-3
571. "a Devilish Perspective"; 572. "The Blaster"; 573. "I Am The Edge"; 574. "Death in Vision"; 575. "The Killers High"; 576. "The Killers High 2"; 577. "Blade" (刃, Yaiba); 578. "The Undead 5"; 579. "The Undead 6"; 580. "The Light"
After being confronted by Yachiru with her Shikai Sanpo Kenjū, Guenael is revealed to be a creation of the real Sternritter "V" Gremmy Thoumeaux, who used his imagination to create a distraction so he can kill off Kensei and Rose. Gremmy proceeds to overwhelm Yachiru before facing Kenpachi in a battle. At one point of the battle, Gremmy summons a meteorite over the Soul Society, but Zaraki uses his Shikai "Nozarashi" to destroy it. Seeing that he can't defeat him, Gremmy decides to imagine himself powerful as Zaraki but ends up being killed by his own imagination. But Kenpachi's victory is short-lived when he and his Squad 11 subordinates are ambushed by Giselle Gewelle, revealed to be Sternritter "Z", and her three associates Sternritters "T" Candice Catnipp, "G" Liltotto Lamperd, and "P" Meninas McAllon.
65	Marching Out the Zombies	October 3, 2014; 978-4-08-880191-9	November 3, 2015; 978-1-4215-8084-5
581. "The Hero 2"; 582. "The Headless Star"; 583. "The Headless Star 2"; 584. "The Headless Star 3"; 585. "The Headless Star 4"; 586. "The Headless Star 5"; 587. "The Headless Star 6"; 588. "The Headless Star 7"; 589. "The Shooting Star Project (The Old and New Trust)"; 590. "Marching Out the ZOMBIES"; 591. "Marching Out the ZOMBIES 2"
Ichigo arrives to the battlefield and saves Kenpachi from the female Quincy team before Bazz-B and three other Sternritters arrive to face him. To make matters worse, Ichigo learns his arrival has allowed Yhwach to take save passage as the Sternritters keep him from going after Yhwach. Though Rukia, Renji, Byakuya, Hisagi, Ikkaku, and Yumichika hold off the Sternritters so he can stop Yhwach, Ichigo is confronted by Uryū before he departs with Yhwach and Haschwalth and confront Tenjiro upon reaching their destination. As Urahara reveals a cannon that Mayuri developed to send Ichigo, Orihime and Chad to the Soul King's palace, Ikkaku and Yumichika fight Giselle and the zombified Bambietta before the battle is joined by Mayuri, and his resurrected Arrancar, Privaron Espada 103 "Dordoni Alessandro Del Socaccio", Privaron Espada 105 "Cirucci Sanderwicci", the 20th Arrancar and also one of "Baraggan Louisenbairn"s' previous six fracción "Charlotte Chuhlhourne", and even the former Sexta Espada that was stroke down by Grimmjow, "Luppi Antenor". and Giselle's trump card: the zombified Hitsugaya.
66	Sorry I Am Strong	January 5, 2015; 978-4-08-880191-9	March 1, 2016; 978-1-4215-8262-7
592. "Marching Out the ZOMBIES 3"; 593. "Marching Out the ZOMBIES 4"; 594. "Rubb-Dolls"; 595. "Rubb-Dolls 2"; 596. "Rubb-Dolls 3"; 597. "Winded By The Shadow"; 598. "The Shooting Star Project (We Only have to Beat You Mix)"; 599. "Too Early To Win, Too Late To Know"; 600. "Snipe"; 601. "Verge On Vermillion"
The zombified Hitsugaya easily defeats Ikkaku, Yumichika and Charlotte, facing Mayuri alongside the zombified versions of Rangiku, Kensei, and Rose. But Mayuri manages to call in his resurrected Arrancar, and face the zombified trio with ease. And later injects two of them with his modified blood to free them from Giselle's control, and make them his own. As she is defeated. Meanwhile, after an unseen battle with Byakuya fighting against the three Sternriiter members, "N" Robert Accutrone, "T" Candice Catnipp and "U" NaNaNa Najahkoop, Sternritter "L" PePe Waccabrada uses his ability to control Hisagi and Meninas before overpowering Byakuya while attempting to take out Liltotto. But Byakuya is quickly saved by Mayuri as he has Kensei defeat Pepe who finds himself eaten by a vengeful Liltotto. In the Soul King Palace, Tenjiro is unable to attack Yhwach due to interference from Sternritter "W" Nianzol Weizol prior to the Sternritter's death by Senjumaru Shutara. After that, Yhwach reveals his elite guard: Sternritters "M" Gerard Valkyrie, "X" Lille Barro, "C" Pernida Parnkgjas and their newest member, Sternritter "D" Askin Nak Le Varr. Though Lille kills Senjumaru and destroys the palace, it is revealed to an illusion as the other Royal Guards join the battle with Ōetsu swiftly killing off all Yhwach's bodyguards save Askin who subjects Ōetsu to his ability.
67	Black	April 3, 2015; 978-4-08-880327-2	July 5, 2016; 978-1-4215-8506-2
602. "Bane Licking Good"; 603. "What The Hell"; 604. "Revitalize"; 605. "Don't Call My Name"; 606. "Divine Division"; 607. "The Master"; 608. "Blacker than Black" (黒より黒し, Kuro yori Kuroshi); 609. "A"; 610. "Mausoleum of Skulls"; 611. "Reio's Death" (霊王死す, Reiō Shisu)
Ōetsu manages to cancel Askin's ability and kills him. But Yhwach uses Auswählen, which allows him to resurrect his elite guard to the detriment of his other Sternritter, killing in the process the Sternritter "N" Robert Accutrone. While the elite guard deals with the members of the Royal Guard, Yhwach faces their leader Ichibe'e Hyōsube. As the battle continues and no one has taken advantage, Ichibe'e releases his Shikai then his Shinuchi (ancestor of Bankai) and manages to completely overwhelm Yhwach. But the Emperor uses his power "The Almighty" and kills Ichibe'e. With the Royal Guard defeated, Yhwach heads towards the Spirit King Palace. Meanwhile, Ichigo's group arrives at the palace and resurrects Ichibe'e, the latter asks Ichigo to stop Yhwach. At the same time, Yhwach pierces the Spirit King with his sword, while revealing that he is the Spirit King's son.
68	The Ordinary Peace	July 3, 2015; 978-4-08-880423-1	November 1, 2016; 978-1-4215-8583-3
612. "Dirty"; 613. "The Ordinary Peace"; 614. "Kill The King"; 615. "All is Lost"; 616. "Mimihagi-sama" (ミミハギ様, Mimihagi-sama); 617. "Return of the God"; 618. "The Dark Arm"; 619. "The Betrayer"; 620. "Where Do You Stand"; 621. "The Dark Curtain"; 622. "The Agony"
The remaining captains and lieutenants join Urahara and his group with the purpose of being transported to the Spirit King Palace. Meanwhile, Ichigo and his friends arrive at the palace and confront Yhwach, but Ichigo's Quincy blood forces him to unwillingly kill the Spirit King, starting the destruction of the Soul Society, Hueco Mundo, and the real world. In response, Ukitake releases Mimihagi, the Spirit King's animate right arm who Ukitake hosted since he was young, to stabilize the Spirit King (at the cost of his life) and Kyōraku releases Aizen from the Muken. At the palace, Uryū and the Schutzstaffel (elite guard) join Yhwach's battle against Ichigo's team, allowing the Emperor to assimilate the King and Mimihagi. The overflow of power creates a mass of black monstrosities which descend upon the Seireitei. The Shinigami fight the creatures until they are joined by Aizen, who destroys all of the creatures with his new tremendous power.
69	Against the Judgement	August 4, 2015; 978-4-08-880460-6	March 7, 2017; 978-1-4215-8701-1
623. "Against the Judgement"; 624. "The Fang"; 625. "Living Jaguar"; 626. "The Holy Newborn"; 627. "The Creation"; 628. "New World Orders"; 629. "Gate of the Sun"; 630. "The Twinned Twilight"; 631. "Friend"; 632. "Friend 2"
Aizen is attacked by the Sternritter "U" NaNaNa Najahkoop but the latter is quickly killed by Bazz-B, who, with Liltotto and Giselle, want to get revenge on their emperor by helping the Shinigami. Meanwhile, Ichigo's group is joined by Grimmjow and Nel while Yhwach begins to build a new world from the ruins of the Soul Society. The group is also unexpectedly accompanied by the Fullbringers Yukio and Riruka as well. Having arrived at the new palace, the Shinigami forces splits into three groups: Ichigo's group, Kyōraku's group, and Mayuri's group and must confront the Schutzstaffel scattered in every part of the palace. Grimmjow finds and engages Askin but is defeated and seemingly killed by him. Bazz-B arrives at the main building and confronts Haschwalth, recalling their shared childhood.
70	Friend	November 4, 2015; 978-4-08-880497-2	July 4, 2017; 978-1-4215-8867-4
633. "Friend 3"; 634. "Friend 4"; 635. "Hooded Enigma"; 636. "Sensitive Monster"; 637. "Baby, Hold Your Hand"; 638. "Seething Malice Is The Height of Comedy" (悪意沸沸滑稽ノ極ミ); 639. "Baby, Hold Your Hand 2"; 640. "Baby, Hold Your Hand 3 (Mad Lullaby no.7)"; 641. "Baby, Hold Your Hand 4 (When I Am Sleeping)"; 642. "Baby, Hold Your Hand 5 (Eyes Are Open)"; 520.5. "walk under two letters"
After Bazz-B and Haschwalth finish recalling their shared past lives as children, in the present, Bazz-B fails at killing Haschwalth, with his final attack being avoided by Haschwalth at the last minute and have him sever his right shoulder and damage his left abdomen. Bazz-B recalls his past once again before slowly dying of his wounds. And at the same time, Giselle and Liltotto also get defeated by Yhwach. Meanwhile, Mayuri and his group encounter Pernida, only for Kenpachi to attack the Quincy and have his arm mangled by it. After incapacitating Kenpachi, Pernida tries to kill him, but Mayuri intervenes, saving Kenpachi and hurting Pernida. Furious, Pernida bursts out of its cloak, revealing its true nature. Much to Mayuri's surprise, Pernida is revealed to be the Soul King's animate left hand and arm. Mayuri engages Pernida in a long battle and due to Pernida having the upper hand for most of the fight, Nemu intervenes against Mayuri's orders. While fighting Pernida, Nemu recalls her past.
71	Baby, Hold Your Hand	March 4, 2016; 978-4-08-880604-4	November 7, 2017; 978-1-4215-9095-0
643. "Baby, Hold Your Hand 6 (Waiting For Love)"; 644. "Baby, Hold Your Hand 7 (Never Ending My Dream)" (BABY, HOLD YOUR HAND 七 [Never Ending My Dream]); 645. "Don't Chase a Shadow"; 646. "The Second Eye"; 647. "The Theatre Suicide"; 648. "The Theatre Suicide Scene 2"; 649. "The Theatre Suicide Scene 3"; 650. "The Theatre Suicide Scene 4"; 651. "The Theatre Suicide Scene 5"; 652. "The Theatre Suicide Scene 6"
Pernida eventually kills Nemu but by devouring her body, it explodes and dies due to the presence of lethal materials in the corpse. Mayuri retrieves Nemu's brain and heals himself with Kenpachi. While Hitsugaya and Rangiku, cured of their zombications, join the battlefield. Meanwhile, Lille tries to kill the entire remaining group of Shingami that are running along to the palace, but he is stopped by Kyōraku, starting a fight against him. Kyōraku seemingly gains the upper hand against Lille, but the latter activates his Vollständig and dominates the Captain-Commander. While Gerard confronts Byakuya, Renji, Rukia, Shinji, and Hinamori, Kyōraku releases his Bankai and manages to seemingly defeat Lille. But the Quincy manages to survive and undergoes another transformation of his Vollständig and nearly kills Kyōraku until Nanao intervenes. Kyōraku decides to tell Nanao the history of her family and gives her back her Zanpakutō, which he kept safe as a promise to Nanao's mother. Shortly after that, the captain and the lieutenant return to face Lille.
72	My Last Words	May 2, 2016; 978-4-08-880649-5	March 6, 2018; 978-1-4215-9166-7
653. "The Theatre Suicide Scene 7"; 654. "Deadman Standing"; 655. "The Miracle"; 656. "God of Thunder"; 657. "God of Thunder 2"; 658. "Fatal Matters Are Cold"; 659. "There Will Be Frost"; 660. "The Visible Answer"; 661. "My Last Words"; 662. "God of Thunder 3"; 663. "God of Thunder 4"
With the power of Nanao's Zanpakutō, Shinken Hakkyōken, she and Kyōraku are able to reflect Lille's strongest attack back at him. This severely injures the Quincy and sends him falling down to the Seireitei, where he is attacked by Izuru Kira. Meanwhile, Gerard is being defeated by the combined might of several Soul Reapers. However, Gerard activates the power of his Schrift, "The Miracle", which converts all the damage he has taken into power, turning him into an unstoppable giant who defeats nearly all of the remaining Soul Reapers until attacked by the remaining Visored and partially frozen by Hitsugaya. Askin, who has defeated Ichigo, mentions that Gerard is believed to be the heart of the Soul King. Orihime and Chad try to help Ichigo, but Askin defeats them as well until Yoruichi intervenes and attacks him, allowing Orihime to heal Ichigo and for the three humans to continue to the palace. Yoruichi is soon joined by her brother, Yūshirō as the two fight Askin together. Yūshirō and Yoruichi lose, until Urahara appears to aid them, forcing Askin to activate his Vollständig. At the palace, Uryū confronts Haschwalth, who has temporarily switched powers with Yhwach. Thanks to "The Almighty", Haschwalth knows that Uryū will betray them and attacks him, until Ichigo, Orihime and Sado arrive. Uryū reveals to them he planned to blow up the palace and Yhwach with it, but now tells his three friends to kill a vulnerable Yhwach while he holds off Haschwalth.
73	Battle Field Burning	July 4, 2016; 978-4-08-880684-6	July 3, 2018; 978-1-4215-9434-7
664. "The Gift"; 665. "The Princess Dissection"; 666. "Empty, Puppet, Hollow" (空っぽ、傀儡、伽藍堂); 667. "Bigger, Louder, Stronger"; 668. "Bigger, Faster, Stronger"; 669. "Blade II" (刃 II, Yaiba II); 670. "The Perfect Crimson"; 671. "The Perfect Crimson 2"; 672. "Son of Darkness"; 673. "Father"; 674. "Father 2"
As Askin's Vollständig overwhelms Urahara, the latter decides to release his Bankai. Together with Grimmjow's help, Urahara manages to mortally wound Askin. Though the Quincy reveals that by doing so, they activates his strongest technique, which he doubts they'll be able to survive. However, having watched the fight from a safe distance, Nel moves in to save her two allies. Meanwhile, Hitsugaya's fight against Gerard continues until a recovered Kenpachi intervenes. While Kenpachi initially seems to have the upper hand, Gerard uses "The Miracle" to reflect Kenpachi's attacks back at him, severely injuring the Shinigami. As Kenpachi lies defeated, an apparation of Yachiru (implied to be Nozarashi itself) appears before him and unleashes Kenpachi's Bankai. With his Bankai, Kenpachi initially manages to overpower Gerard until the Quincy activates his Vollständig in response. Before Kenpachi can continue the fight, he is forced to deactivate his Bankai as it is starting to overwhelm his body. Left with no other choice, Hitsugaya unleashes the full potential of his Bankai, and together with Byakuya and Kenpachi, they manage to seemingly kill Gerard until the latter regenerates into an even stronger form. At the same time, Ichigo and Orihime have arrived at Yhwach's throne room and Hashwalth and Yhwach switch back to their respective powers. As Ichigo and Orihime battle Yhwach, Byakuya tells Rukia and Renji to head to the palace to aid Ichigo. Meanwhile, Ryūken and Isshin have arrived at the palace as well using one of Sōken's Quincy artifacts.
74	The Death and the Strawberry	November 4, 2016; 978-4-08-880774-4	October 2, 2018; 978-1-4215-9602-0
675. "Blood for My Bone"; 676. "Horn of Salvation"; 677. "Horn of Salvation 2"; 678. "The Future Black"; 679. "The End"; 680. "The End 2"; 681. "The End Two World"; 682. "The Two Sided World End"; 683. "The Dark Side of Two World Ends"; 684. "The Blade"; 685. "A Perfect End" (無欠の果て); 686. "Death & Strawberry"
As Uryū continues fighting Haschwalth, the Sternritter Grand Master comments on how the Almighty can see into the future and even describes another ability he has as he charges at the latter. Meanwhile, Ichigo struggles against Yhwach, with the former losing to the empowered Soul King-Mimihagi Quincy King. As Ichigo begins to take in all the damage from Yhwach's relentless dark energy attacks, he then activates on a True Bankai True Tensa Zangetsu: one with a fusion of his Hollow horn and Quincy Blut Vene. Ichigo blasts Yhwach with a Gran Rey Cero infused Getsuga Tenshō, however, Yhwach sets up traps for Ichigo by using his ability, "The Almighty " and breaks his sword before he ever gets the chance to attack. Meanwhile, Uryū appears to be losing against Haschwalth, but momentarily gains the upper hand by using his Schrift ability, "The Antithesis" which reverses all attacks received back on the attacker. He is however defeated in turn by Haschwalth's ability, "The Balance" which is similar to Uryū's but on a superior level. Ichigo is then defeated by Yhwach. Who drains him of all his Quincy-Hollow powers completely, as well as taking back his Quincy powers from both Haschwalth and Gerard Valkyrie, killing the two Quincies. He then proceeds back to the Soul Society where he is confronted by Aizen, who is still strapped in his chair. Back in the Soul King's palace, Uryū is told by a dying Haschwalth that there might still be hope to defeat Yhwach. His father along with Isshin give him a silver arrowhead, called the Still Silver Arrowhead, which is said to be able to temporarily seal a Quincy's powers. A despondent Ichigo is left feeling hopeless, after now being made completely powerless is given one last pep talk by Renji who tells him not to give up. After Ginjo and Tsukishima restore Ichigo's true bankai, Ichigo and Renji decide to go through a portal made by Yhwach that leads to the Soul Society. Aizen, having been freed by Yhwach, decides to face him in battle, as he refuses to be ruled by anyone other than himself. Ichigo and Renji then arrive to help, but are still overwhelmed by Yhwach's power. Yhwach lands a deadly attack on Ichigo, only for him to realize that it was an illusion created by Aizen, and in turn received an attack from Ichigo that cuts him in half. Before the battle is over Yhwach reconstitutes his body, but is shot with the Still Silver Arrowhead used by Uryū, which stops his powers long enough for Ichigo to land a final decisive blow that ends the battle for good. Cutting Yhwach in half for good, the scene is then cut to ten years later (2013). Rukia is revealed to have married Renji for years now; while at the same time a promotion ceremony is being held for Rukia who has now been made the new captain of Squad 13. Elsewhere, Mayuri Kurotsuchi is investigating remnants of Yhwach's energy that are still lingering in Soul Society. Ichigo and his friends are hosting a party to watch a boxing match on television featuring Chad. Meanwhile Ichigo has married Orihime and they now have a son named Kazui; soon Kazui notices a strange ball of energy in his room, and when he grabs it, he inadvertently snuffs out Yhwach in the past during Ichigo's final battle, with the latter stating that his goal of ending all suffering in the universe has now been stopped. Afterwards, the daughter of Rukia and Renji, Ichika Abarai, appears in the room, stating that she is a Shinigami in training with Kazui showcasing that he too is a Shinigami, leaving her shocked into question.
