= Dear (Vivid song) =

Single by ViViD
- Released: August 19, 2009 (CD+DVD) February 01, 2010 (CD Only)
- Genre: Rock
- Label: PS Company

Vivid singles chronology
"Take-off" (2009)	"Dear" (2009)	"Across the Border" (2010)

"Dear" is the second single by ViViD, released a month after their debut single, "Take-off". It was first released in a two-disc format, which included a DVD with the title song's PV, limited to 3,000 copies. When it sold out, a CD-only version was released on February 1, 2010. The single reached #2 on the Tower Records J-Indies chart and #44 on the Oricon singles chart where it charted for a week; it has sold 2,023 copies.

== Track listing ==
CD Tracklist (Regular and Limited Editions)
No.	Title	Length
1.	"Dear"
2.	"Distance of mind"
3.	"Setsu no Hito" (睡蓮人; Water Lily People)

DVD Tracklist (Limited Edition ONLY)
No.	Title	Length
1.	"Dear (PV)"
