= The Vivid Color =

Studio album by Vivid
- Released: October 21, 2009
- Genre: Alternative rock, pop punk
- Length: 32:02 (Regular edition)
- Label: PS Company

Alternate cover
- Regular Edition Cover

The Vivid Color is the debut mini-album released by the Japanese band Vivid. It was released in two different versions: a limited CD+DVD edition and a regular CD only edition. It is the band's first release to be available in two versions. The limited edition came with a DVD of the PV for the mini-album's main promotional track "69-II". The regular edition came with a different track list and two extra tracks, "Kimi Koi" and "Trail of Tears". The mini-album reached number 34 on the Oricon Albums Chart, where it charted for two weeks, selling 4,125 copies.

== Track listing ==
Limited edition CD+DVD – CD track list
No.	Title	Length
1.	"69-II"	4:35
2.	"butterfly"	4:41
3.	"Chroni-kuru" (Ｃｈｒｏｎｉ狂; Chroni-Crazy)	3:34
4.	"Hamon" (波紋; Ripple)	5:05
5.	"Hoshi no Ame" (星ノ雨; Rain of Stars)	4:51

Limited edition CD+DVD – DVD track list
No.	Title	Length
1.	"69-II (PV)"

Regular edition / Album version CD – CD track list
No.	Title	Length
1.	"69-II"	4:35
2.	"butterfly"	4:41
3.	"Kimi Koi" (キミコイ; You, Love)	3:53
4.	"Hoshi no Ame" (星ノ雨; Rain of Stars)	4:51
5.	"Chroni-kuru" (Ｃｈｒｏｎｉ狂; Chroni-Crazy)	3:34
6.	"Hamon" (波紋; Ripple)	5:05
7.	"Trail of Tears"	5:27
