= Real (Vivid song) =

2012 single by Vivid

Single by ViViD
- Released: May 16, 2012
- Genre: Rock
- Label: Epic Records

ViViD singles chronology
| "Message" (2012) | "Real" (2012) | "Answer" (2013) |

"Real" is the fifth major and ninth overall single released by ViViD on May 16, 2012. The single was released in three versions: two limited edition CD+DVD editions (A+B), and a regular CD only edition that comes with bonus songs. The limited A edition comes with a DVD of the title song's music video, making of, and a bonus video; the limited B edition contains the title song's music video with a bonus video. The titular track was used as the third opening for the anime series Mobile Suit Gundam AGE.

== Commercial performance ==
The single reached sixth position at Oricon Singles Chart, staying on chart for eight weeks.

== Track listing ==
Regular Edition CD - CD Tracklist
| No. | Title | Length |
|---|---|---|
| 1. | "REAL" | 4:13 |
| 2. | "envision my way" | 5:00 |
| 3. | "Kimi Koi" (キミコイ; You, Love) |
| 4. | "REAL (TV anime version)" (REAL (TV アニメ・ヴァージョン)) |
| 5. | "REAL (Instrumental)" |

Limited Editions CD+DVD - CD Tracklist
| No. | Title | Length |
|---|---|---|
| 1. | "REAL" | 4:14 |
| 2. | "envision my way" | 5:00 |

Limited Edition A CD+DVD - DVD Tracklist
| No. | Title | Length |
|---|---|---|
| 1. | "REAL" (MUSIC VIDEO) |
| 2. | "REAL" (MUSIC VIDEO Making (メイキング)) |
| 3. | "VIVID 1ST ALBUM HIT KIGAN!! SHISA ZUKURI" (ViViD 1stアルバムヒット祈願!! シーサー作り; 1st album hit pray ViViD!! Making Shisa) |

Limited Edition B CD+DVD - DVD Tracklist
| No. | Title | Length |
|---|---|---|
| 1. | "REAL" (MUSIC VIDEO) |
| 2. | "VIVID NO KYUUJITSU-OKINAWA HEN-" (ViViDの休日〜沖縄編〜; Okinawa - Holiday Hen ViViD) |
