= Infinity (Vivid album) =

Studio album by Vivid
- Released: June 27, 2012
- Genre: Alternative rock, pop rock
- Length: 54:40 (Regular edition)
- Label: EPIC Records

Limited Edition Cover

Infinity is the debut album released by the Japanese band Vivid. This was released in two different versions: a limited CD+DVD edition, and a regular CD only edition. It is the band's first studio album and first album after going major with EPIC Records. The regular edition came with an extra track, "EVER". The song "live your life" was also used as a theme song for the multiplayer online role-playing game Dragon Nest. The album peaked at number 10 on Oricon Albums Chart.

== Track listing ==
Limited Edition CD+DVD - CD Tracklist
No.	Title	Length
1.	"live your life"	3:30
2.	"Blue"	3:26
3.	"REAL"	3:34
4.	"memories in white"	4:12
5.	"calling"	4:01
6.	"kakera" (カケラ; Pieces)	3:47
7.	"Natsukaze ~endless love~" (夏風 ～ｅｎｄｌｅｓｓ ｌｏｖｅ～; Cold Summer ~endless love~)	4:59
8.	"explosion"	4:35
9.	""Yume" ~Mugen no Kanata" (「夢」 ～ムゲンノカナタ～; "Dreams" ~Beyond The Fantasy~)	3:48
10.	"RIDE on time"	3:53
11.	"FAKE"	4:39
12.	"message"	4:53

Limited Edition CD+DVD - DVD Tracklist
No.	Title	Length
1.	"ViViD x Shimada Shuhei"
2.	"ViViD no Mirai wa Ikaga ni 2012 (documentary footage)"
3.	"Album recording offshoot footage"

Regular Edition CD - CD Tracklist
No.	Title	Length
1.	"live your life"	3:30
2.	"Blue"	3:26
3.	"REAL"	3:34
4.	"memories in white"	4:12
5.	"calling"	4:01
6.	"kakera" (カケラ; Pieces)	3:47
7.	"Natsukaze ~endless love~" (夏風 ～ｅｎｄｌｅｓｓ ｌｏｖｅ～; Cold Summer ~endless love~)	4:59
8.	"explosion"	4:35
9.	""Yume" ~Mugen no Kanata" (「夢」 ～ムゲンノカナタ～; "Dreams" ~Beyond The Fantasy~)	3:48
10.	"RIDE on time"	3:53
11.	"FAKE"	4:39
12.	"message"	4:53
13.	"EVER"	4:51
