= Fumika =

- Gender: Female

Origin
- Origin: Japanese
- Meaning: Different meanings depending on the kanji used

Other names
- Alternative spelling: フミカ

Fumika (written: 史華, 史佳, 史加, 文香, 富美加 or ふみか in hiragana) is a feminine Japanese given name. Notable people with the name include:

- Fumika Baba (馬場 ふみか; born 1995), Japanese actress and model
- Fumika Moriya (森谷 史佳; born 1992), Japanese volleyball player
- Fumika Sasano (笹野 文香; born 1997), Japanese ice hockey player
- Fumika Shimizu (清水 富美加; born 1994), Japanese actress and gravure idol
- Fumika Kawaharada (川原田 文香; born 1976), Japanese Bharathanatyam dancer.
- Fumika Suzuki (鈴木 史華; born 1974), Japanese voice actress and gravure idol

== Fictional characters ==
- Fumika (フミカ/文歌), protagonist of the anime series Shigofumi: Letters from the Departed
- Fumika Narutaki (鳴滝 史伽), a character from the manga and anime series Negima! Magister Negi Magi
- Fumika Kitagou (北郷 章香), a character from Strike Witches
- Fumika Kodama (木霊 文花), a character from Yo-kai Watch
