= Vivid (band) =

Japanese visual kei rock band

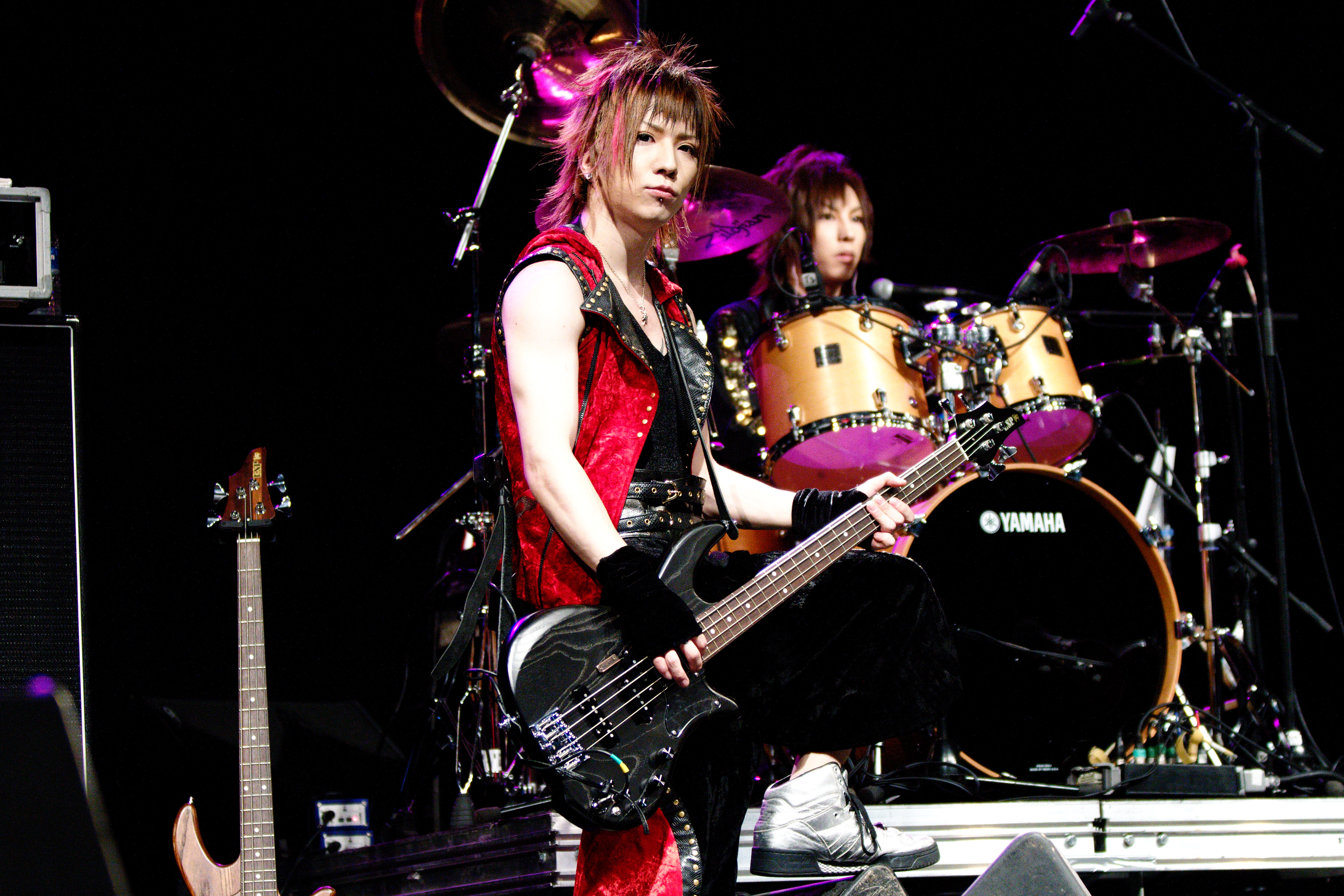

Background information
- Origin: Tokyo, Japan
- Genres: Alternative rock, pop punk
- Years active: 2009–2015, 2025–present
- Labels: PS company, Epic Records Japan
- Members: Shin; Reno; Ryōga; Iv
- Past members: Ko-Ki
- Website: www.vivid2025.com

Vivid (stylized as ViViD) is a five-member Japanese visual kei rock band from Tokyo. The band was formed in March 2009 and is currently signed with Sony Music Japan's Epic Records Japan label. Vivid had announced on Jan 28, 2015, that they will be disbanding after the last stop of their final tour in April. They returned in 2025 without Ko-Ki for national tours.

== History ==
=== 2009–2010: Formation and early career ===
Vivid was formed in March 2009 by the rhythm section, Iv (ex-Kisnate) and Ko-ki (ex-Novelis). Later in March they acquired vocalist Shin (ex-Dennou Romeo), and guitarists Reno (ex-Novelis) and Ryoga. In early April, the Indie-PSC website announced that Vivid had been signed to the label. On April 19, the band started official activities with their first live performance at Takadanobaba Area in Tokyo. With their own official website opening later in April, the band announced in May that their first releases were to be released July and August.

During May and June, they performed a total of five live performances, starting with Shibuya O-West on May 11, and ending with Shibuya O-West on June 24. Vivid's debut single, "Take-off", was released on July 8. The single reached number 2 on the indies Oricon charts, and number 63 on the major charts where it charted for a week. Before their next single, they played a string of three live concerts; on July 18, July 24, and August 9 all at Takadanobaba Area.

Their second single, "Dear", was released on August 19, 2009. It was first released in a CD+DVD only format and featured their first promotional video. "Dear" reached second on the indies Oricon charts, and number 44 on the major charts where it charted for a week. It subsequently sold out and was re-released on February 1, 2010 as a CD-only format. The month was finished off with a live appearance at Takadanobaba Area on August 31, 2009.

In September and October 2009, Vivid took part in seven "Chichū Rōkaku" events organized by the PS Company, beginning with the 94th volume at Takadanobaba Area on September 19. The 95th to 97th volumes all took place at Takadanobaba Area: one on September 20, the second on September 26, and the last on September 27. The three volumes in October were at different venues; 98 was at Nagoya E.L.L on October 9, 99 was at Umeda Akaso on October 10, and 100 was at Kawasaki Club Citta on October 17.

On October 21, 2009, the band released their debut mini-album, The Vivid Color. It was their first release to be available in two different versions. The mini-album reached number 34 on the major Oricon charts, where it charted for two weeks. Also on October 21, they appeared at the "H'evn no Omatsuri Tenmade Tobō!" event organised by H'evn magazine at Shibuya O-West. Three days later, Vivid at the "V-Rock Festival '09" mega-event at Makuhari Messe exhibition center in Chiba. Concluding the month was the special Halloween event "Area Halloween Special Live 2009" at Takadanobaba Area.

November began with a concert titled "The Vivid Color" at Shibuya O-West. During the next two months, Vivid participated in six events. The first was v[Neu]'s "Time-Limit Vol.1" sponsored event presented by Loop Ash Records at Takadanobaba Area on November 22. The last event in November was the 101st volume of the "Chichū Rōkaku" events at Takadanobaba Area on November 28. December started with the "Absolute Domain Zettai Ryōiki" event at Esaka Muse on the 8th. The next day there was another "Absolute Domain Zettai Ryōiki" event at Nagoya E.L.L. The last two events of the year were the 103rd "Chichū Rōkaku" at Takadanobaba Area on the 26th and the "Final 2009" event also at Takadanobaba Area on the 31st.

Their third single, titled "Across the Border", was released on February 17, 2010 in three different versions and topped number 22 on the Oricon singles weekly chart.

On July 3 and 4, 2010, Vivid performed at the J.E. Live House in Paris, France, during the Japan Expo 2010. This was the first time that Vivid had performed outside Japan.

Their fourth single, "Precious", was released on July 7, 2010, reaching number 15 on the Oricon Weekly Chart. In August 2010, it was announced that Vivid would sign with Sony Music Japan's Epic Records label.

=== 2011–present: Going major and disbandment ===
Their fifth single and first major label single, "Yume Mugen no Kanata" (「夢」～ムゲンノカナタ～), ending theme song to the Level E anime, was released on January 19, 2011.

Their sixth single, "Blue", was released on July 13, 2011, was used as the 14th opening theme of the Bleach anime.

Vivid embarked on an Asia tour 2011, appearing in Taiwan, Hong Kong, and Singapore. On August 2, 2011, Vivid performed at the 13th annual ACGHK 2011 Heart Beat Seinen Music Festival in Hong Kong, China. Vivid performed at the V-Rock Festival 2011 in Makuhari Messe on October 23. Vivid held their live concert at The Wall, Taipei on November 18 and 19. Vivid performed live at the Sundown Festival in Singapore on November 26, 2011.

The title song for Vivid's 7th single, "Fake", was used as the theme song for the dating simulation game Koi to Shigoto to Kimi no Produce while the single was released on November 9, 2011.

"Vivid Live 2012 Take Off: Birth to the New World" took place at the Nippon Budokan in Tokyo on January 7, 2012. Their 8th single, "Message", was released on January 11, 2012. The song was written about Shin's feelings about their show at Budokan.

"Real", Vivid's 9th single and third opening for Mobile Suit Gundam AGE, was released on May 16, 2012.

Vivid released their first studio album Infinity on June 27, 2012.

"Hikari", Vivid's single is the second opening for Magi: Kingdom of Magic, was released on Feb 5, 2014.

On Jan 28, 2015, Vivid had announced that they were disbanding after the last stop of their final tour, Pacifico Yokohama.

On April 29, 2015, it was announced that guitarist RENO will continue a solo career as a guitarist under PS Company. His 「1st ONEMAN LIVE GUITAR LIFE」will be held at Shibuya REX on June 4, 2015. Vocalist Shin is also continuing a solo career with Zany Zap Records. His first solo album "Good Morning Dreamer" was released on August 23, 2017.

Vivid reunited ten years later on March 22 and 23, 2025, to play at the Tokyo Garden Theater. After the success of these shows, the band officially returned and announced several tours across Japan for 2025. However, drummer Ko-Ki is not participating.

== Members ==
- Shin (シン) - vocals
- Reno (零乃(れの)) - lead guitar
- Ryōga (怜我(りょうが)) - rhythm guitar
- Iv (イヴ) - bass
- Ko-Ki - drums, synthesizers, turntables

== Discography ==
=== Albums ===
| Title | Release date | Label | Type |
|---|---|---|---|
| The Vivid Color | October 21, 2009 | PS Company | Mini-album |
| Infinity | June 27, 2012 | Epic | Studio album |
| The Pendulum | February 26, 2014 | Epic | Full album |

=== Singles ===
| Title | Release date | Label | Soundtrack Anime |
|---|---|---|---|
| "Take-off" | July 8, 2009 | PS Company | |
| "Dear" | August 19, 2009 | PS Company | |
| "Across the Border" | February 17, 2010 | PS Company | |
| "Precious" | July 7, 2010 | PS Company | |
| ""Yume" ~Mugen no Kanata~" | January 19, 2011 | Epic Records | OST Level E Ending |
| "Blue" | July 13, 2011 | Epic Records | OST Bleach 14th Opening |
| "Fake" | November 9, 2011 | Epic Records | |
| "Message" | January 11, 2012 | Epic Records | |
| "Real" | May 16, 2012 | Epic Records | OST 3rd opening for Mobile Suit Gundam AGE |
| "Answer" | April 24, 2013 | Epic Records | |
| "Hikari" | February 5, 2014 | Epic Records | OST Magi: The Kingdom of Magic |
| "Thank you for all -From the beginning" | January 28, 2015 | Epic Records | |

=== Music videos ===
| Year | Song |
|---|---|
| 2009 | "Dear" |
| 2009 | "69-II" |
| 2010 | "Across The Border" |
| 2010 | "Precious" |
| 2011 | "Yume: Mugen no Kanata" |
| 2011 | "Blue" (2 versions) |
| 2011 | "Fake" |
| 2012 | "Message" |
| 2012 | "Real" |
| 2013 | "Answer" |
| 2014 | "Hikari" |
| 2015 | "Thank you for all" |
| 2015 | "From the Beginning" |
