= Across the Border (band) =

German folk punk band

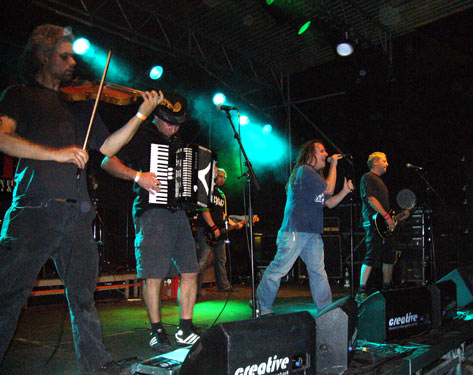
- Across the Border 2007

Background information
- Origin: Remchingen, Germany
- Genres: Folk punk
- Years active: 1991–2002, 2007–2012, 2016–present

Across the Border are a German folk punk band from Remchingen in Baden-Württemberg.

== History ==
Across the Border were formed in 1991, split up in 2002 and reunited in 2007. In the alternative scene, the band gained a reputation far beyond the borders of Baden-Württemberg and also toured abroad several times. In total, Across the Border have played around 350 concerts to date.

The band combines elements of punk rock, folk, ska and rock. Many songs are now regarded as classics of the genre, for example "I can't love this country", "Last Crusade" or the cover version of "Die Nacht ist nicht allein zum Schlafen da". In their lyrics, the band often takes a critical look at social conditions and developments and is anti-fascist.

In November 2002, Across the Border split up for the first time after eleven years of band history, more than 300 concerts throughout Germany, in the Czech Republic, Switzerland and France and more than 30,000 records sold, as the double burden of job and band was no longer sustainable for some band members. In Baden, the band had by then reached the point of playing 1,000-capacity halls, but this trend could not be extended nationwide.

In May 2007, the band announced that they had decided to reunite in the spring. The new studio album Loyalty was released nationwide on 16 January 2009 via Twisted Chords / Broken Silence.

Nicole Ansperger was recruited as successor to violinist David, who left the band in summer 2008.

On 17 November 2012, the band announced their split once again with a performance at the Substage in Karlsruhe.

In 2016 the vinyl album Calling 999 was released; it was then offered in several clubs in Karlsruhe.

The band played comeback concerts in 2017, 2022 and 2024 in Karlsruhe and Freiburg.

== Discography ==
=== Studio albums ===
- 1994: Hag Songs (self-released)
- 1996: Crusty Folk Music for Smelly People (Wolverine Records/SPV)
- 1997: … But Life Is Boring, Sir, Without Committing a Crime! (Wolverine Records/SPV)
- 1999: If I Can’t Dance, It’s Not My Revolution (Wolverine Records/SPV)
- 2009: Loyalty (Twisted Chords/Broken Silence)
- 2011: Folkpunk Air-Raid (Twisted Chords/Broken Silence)
- 2016: Calling 999 (limited 12" LP including the Calling 999 download EP)

=== EPs ===
- 1993: Dance Around the Fire (self-released)
- 1998: This Guardian Angel (Wolverine Records/SPV)
- 2001: Short Songs, Long Faces (Wolverine Records/SPV)
- 2016: Calling 999 (Bandcamp)

=== Live albums and compilations ===
- 2001: Rare and Unreleased Tracks (7" vinyl single) (Twisted Chords)
- 2002: Was bleibt – The Best of Across the Border (CD) (Wolverine Records/Soulfood)
- 2005: The Last Dance Around the Fire (live bootleg of the 2002 farewell concerts) (Twisted Chords)
- 2010: The Best So Far (Uncle Owen Music, released only in Japan)

== Side projects ==
- Ahead to the Sea
- Nicole Ansperger has been a member of Eluveitie since 2013.
- Kölsch & Josh
- Bordkapelle Akkermann
