= Take-off (Vivid song) =

Single by Vivid
- Released: July 8, 2009
- Genre: Rock
- Length: 12:58
- Label: PS Company

Vivid singles chronology
"Take-off" (2009)	"Dear" (2009)

"Take-off" is the debut single released by the Japanese band Vivid. A document music video was made for the title song and is available on the limited B CD+DVD edition of their major debut (and fifth overall) single ""Yume": Mugen no Kanata" along with a live performance of the title track taped at Shibuya-AX on August 8, 2010. The single reached number 3 on the indies Oricon weekly charts and number 63 on the overall chart where it charted for a week. It has sold 1,319 copies.

== Track listing ==
CD Tracklist
No.	Title	Length
1.	"Take-off"	4:34
2.	"W.B.A"	4:50
3.	"J-guild"	3:35
