= Blue (Vivid song) =

Single by Vivid

Single by Vivid
- Released: July 13, 2011
- Recorded: 2011
- Genre: Rock
- Label: Epic Records
- Songwriters: Ivu, Shin

Vivid singles chronology
""Yume" ~Mugen no Kanata~" (2011)	"Blue" (2011)	"Fake" (2011)

Music video
- "Blue" on YouTube

"Blue" (stylized as BLUE) is the second major and sixth overall single release by the Japanese band Vivid. The single was released in three different versions: two limited CD+DVD editions (A+B) and a regular CD only edition. Each limited edition contains a different type of the title song's music video, but differs in the second live track: A comes with ""Yume" ~Mugen no Kanata~", while B comes with the unreleased song "Ril". Both live performances were taped during their last indies oneman live, which was released as the DVD Indies Last: Vivid Oneman Live "Kousai Genesis". The regular edition contains the B-side track "Re:Load", and the first press of this edition with an original Bleach cover jacket and one randomly chosen trading card (out of a possible six). The title track was used as the 14th opening theme song in the anime Bleach. The single reached number 4 on the Oricon weekly charts, where it charted for eight weeks.

== Track listing ==
Regular edition CD – CD track list
No.	Title	Length
1.	"Blue"
2.	"Crisis"
3.	"Re:Load"

Limited edition CD+DVD – CD track list
No.	Title	Length
1.	"Blue"
2.	"Crisis"

Limited edition A CD+DVD – CD track list
No.	Title	Length
1.	"Blue" (music video type-A)
2.	""Yume" Mugen no Kanata" (Indies last Oneman live at C.C. Lemon Hall on December 27, 2010)

Limited edition B CD+DVD – CD track list
No.	Title	Length
1.	"Blue" (music video type-B)
2.	"Ril" ((Indies last Oneman live at C.C. Lemon Hall on December 27, 2010)
