= Bleach season 16 =

Season of television series

Bleach
- Season 16
- Cover art for the first home media volume of the Lost Agent arc as released by Aniplex, featuring Ichigo Kurosaki
- No. of episodes: 24

Release
- Original network: TV Tokyo
- Original release: October 11, 2011 – March 27, 2012

Season chronology
- ← Previous; Season 15

The sixteenth and final season of the Bleach anime television series is known as the Lost Agent arc (死神代行消失篇, Shinigami Daikō Shōshitsu-hen). It is directed by Noriyuki Abe, and produced by TV Tokyo, Dentsu, and Studio Pierrot. Based on Tite Kubo's manga series of the same name, the season is set seventeen months after Ichigo Kurosaki defeated Sousuke Aizen at cost of his Soul Reaper powers. He accompanies Kūgo Ginjō, the leader of Xcution, an organization composed of Fullbringers, who proposes him to recover his power.

The season aired from October 11, 2011, to March 27, 2012. Aniplex collected it in six DVD volumes between August 22, 2012, and January 23, 2013. The English adaptation of the Bleach anime is licensed by Viz Media, and the season aired on Adult Swim's Toonami programming block from May 4 to November 2, 2014.

The episodes of this season use three pieces of theme music; one opening and two endings. The opening theme song is "Harukaze" performed by Scandal. The first ending theme song, "Re:pray" performed by Aimer, is used from episodes 343 to 354, while the second ending theme song, "Mask" performed by Aqua Timez, is used from episode 355 to 366.

== Episodes ==
No. overall	No. in season	Title	Directed by (Note: Production staff information is taken from the ending credits of each episode.)	Written by	Animation directed by	Original release date	English air date
343	1	"3rd Year High School Student! Dressed Up, and a New Chapter Begins!"; Transliteration: "Kōkō San Nensei! Yosoi Arata ni Shinshō Kaishi!" (Japanese: 高校3年生！装い新たに新章開始！)	Directed by : Yasuto Nishikata; Storyboarded by : Yukihiro Matsushita	Masahiro Okubo	Tomomi Umemura	October 11, 2011	May 4, 2014
Seventeen months after the defeat of Sousuke Aizen at the cost of his Soul Reaper powers by the use of the Final Getsuga Tenshō, now seventeen-year-old Ichigo Kurosaki has been living in peace as a third year high school student. On the way home from school, Ichigo incapacitates a thief and returns the stolen bag to its owner. The next day, the thief and his gang seek out Ichigo at his school and are confronted by Uryū Ishida. Elsewhere, the owner of the stolen bag meets with his friends revealing he has found Ichigo.
344	2	"A Dispute in School?! Ichigo and Uryū, Fight Together!"; Transliteration: "Gakkō Kan Kōsō!? Ichigo to Uryū, Kyōtou!" (Japanese: 学校間抗争!? 一護と雨竜、共闘！)	Directed by : Mitsutaka Noshitani; Storyboarded by : Tadahito Matsubayashi	Kazuyuki Fudeyasu	Natsuko Suzuki	October 18, 2011	May 11, 2014
Ichigo and Uryū dispatch the gang with ease but are interrupted when Ichigo's part-time job boss, Ikumi Unagiya, kidnaps and forces him to work. Their client, the owner of the stolen bag, requests an investigation on Isshin Kurosaki, Ichigo's father. Ichigo declines but is intrigued when the owner reveals that one of his younger sisters, Karin Kurosaki, had been visiting Kisuke Urahara. The owner introduces himself as Kūgo Ginjō, gives Ichigo a Xcution business card and cryptically warns him to act before his family is hurt. Uryū, passing by Ichigo's house, pursues a strange man and is critically injured as a result.
345	3	"Uryū Is Attacked, a Threat Draws Near Friends!"; Transliteration: "Osowa-reta Uryū, Nakama-tachi ni Semaru Kyōi!" (Japanese: 襲われた雨竜、仲間達に迫る脅威！)	Directed by : Junya Koshiba; Storyboarded by : Tetsuhito Saito	Kento Shimoyama	Masaya Ōnishi	October 25, 2011	May 18, 2014
While walking at night, Ichigo decides to forget his past and throws his substitute badge into the river. Later, he hears from Orihime Inoue that Uryū is in the hospital. At the hospital, Ryūken Ishida sends Ichigo home and reveals to Orihime the assailant was a human with powers and cautions her to be careful. The next day, Ichigo's friends, Keigo Asano and Mizuiro Kojima, are attacked by the thief whom Ichigo had stopped prior. Ichigo saves them and meets Uryū's assailant who flees when Ryūken arrives. Ichigo, realizing he is being excluded from information due to his lack of powers, decides to contact Xcution.
346	4	"The Man with the Fullbring Ability: Kūgo Ginjō"; Transliteration: "Furuburingu no Nōryokusha: Ginjō Kūgo" (Japanese: 完現術(フルブリング)の能力者・銀城空吾)	Directed by : Tadahito Matsubayashi; Storyboarded by : Takahiro Takamizawa	Masahiro Okubo	Sanae Shimada	November 1, 2011	June 1, 2014
After contacting Ginjō, Ichigo is led to the Xcution headquarters and learns its members possess the ability dubbed as Fullbring, which allows them to manipulate the souls of inanimate objects. The cause of the power are residual spiritual energy from hollows who attacked their pregnant mothers. Yasutora "Chad" Sado, who had been missing, appears at the headquarters, shocking Ichigo. Ginjō reveals that Xcution plans to restore Ichigo's Soul Reaper powers in order to rid themselves of their Fullbring abilities. Ichigo declines, stating that he is only seeking information his family and friends are hiding from him.
347	5	"A Crisis Sneaking Up on the Kurosaki Family?! Ichigo's Confusion!"; Transliteration: "Kurosaki-ka ni Shinobiyoru Kiki!? Ichigo no Mayoi!" (Japanese: 黒崎家に忍び寄る危機!? 一護の迷い！)	Directed by : Mitsutaka Noshitani; Storyboarded by : Noriyuki Abe	Kento Shimoyama	Yukari Takeuchi	November 8, 2011	June 8, 2014
Uryū's assailant stabs an incomplete hollow and asks for its cooperation. Ichigo returns home and resumes his life. Chad attempts to convince Ichigo to accept Xcution's offer, stating that Ichigo himself wants the power to protect his loved ones. While walking through town, Ichigo sees Uryū's assailant and pursues him but runs into his other younger sister, Yuzu Kurosaki, on the way. The hollow attacks them and are saved when Ginjō dispatches it. As a result, Ichigo returns to Xcution and accepts their offer, and Ginjō returns Ichigo's substitute badge back to him.
348	6	"Power of the Substitute Badge, Ichigo's "Pride"!"; Transliteration: "Daikōshō no Chikara, Ichigo no "Hokori"!" (Japanese: 代行証の力、一護の"誇り"！)	Directed by : Kazunori Mizuno (Note: Credited as Kumi Hitokuchi); Storyboarded by : Junya Koshiba	Kazuyuki Fudeyasu	Yoko Suzuki	November 15, 2011	June 15, 2014
The next day, Ichigo is called in to Xcution headquarters to learn how to use the Fullbring abilities. Ichigo is shrunken and placed in a dollhouse by Riruka Dokugamine, where he has to defeat an aggressive pig plushie under a time limit set by Giriko Kutsuzawa. When Chad advises Ichigo to use his pride, Ichigo uses his substitute badge as the focal item to materialize his Fullbring.
349	7	"Next Target, the Devil's Hand Aims at Orihime!"; Transliteration: "Tsugi no Hyōteki, Orihime o Osou Ma no Te!" (Japanese: 次の標的、織姫を襲う魔の手！)	Directed by : Geisei Morita; Storyboarded by : Takehiro Nakayama	Mio Imamura	Shuji Maruyama & Makoto Koga	November 22, 2011	June 22, 2014
Ichigo defeats the pig plushie with his Fullbring and is freed from the dollhouse. Elsewhere, Orihime is confronted by Moe Shishigawara, who intends to kill her. Shishigawara is then interrupted by his superior, Uryū's assailant, who is revealed to be Shūkurō Tsukishima. Tsukishima prepares to punish Shishigawara for going against his orders, but Orihime decides to intervene.
350	8	"The Man Who Killed the Shinigami Substitute?! Tsukishima Makes His Move"; Transliteration: "Shinigami Daikō o Koroshita Otoko!? Ugokidasu Tsukishima" (Japanese: 死神代行を殺した男!? 動き出す月島)	Directed by : Yasuto Nishikata; Storyboarded by : Yukihiro Matsushita	Masahiro Okubo	Tomomi Umemura	November 29, 2011	June 29, 2014
Tsukishima pretends to impale Orihime's chest and leaves her. Although Orihime suffered no cuts, she starts having a vague idea that Tsukishima was her friend. Unwilling to worry Ichigo about what happened, she only tells Chad about Tsukishima. Aware that Orihime is hiding information from him, Ichigo goes back to Xcution headquarters and Gingō reveals that Tsukishima was Xcution's original founding member, but when they found a Substitute Soul Reaper to transfer of some their members powers to Tsukishima killed him and the members involved in the transfer before disappearing. In light of Tsukishima actions Gingō decides to speed up Ichigo's training.
351	9	"Fullbring, the Detested Power!"; Transliteration: "Furuburingu, Imikirawa-reta Chikara!" (Japanese: フルブリング、忌み嫌われた力！)	Kazunori Mizuno	Kento Shimoyama	Makoto Shimojima & Akio Kawamura	December 6, 2011	July 13, 2014
Ichigo continues his training, but desires to actually battle one of the members of Xcution. Ginjō suggests that Jackie Tristan should be his opponent, but she refuses and storms off. Meanwhile, Tsukishima sends Shishigawara to tail Chad. However, while Chad is wary of Shishigawara's presence, no attack on him is attempted. Later, Jackie decides that she will fight Ichigo in a fish tank after seeing him pass his training in a bird cage, both set up by Riruka. She fully introduces herself, activates her Fullbring using her boots and proceeds to attack a surprised Ichigo.
352	10	"Tsukishima Attacks! The Training Has Been Thwarted!"; Transliteration: "Tsukishima, Kyūshū! Bōgaisa-reta Shūgyō!" (Japanese: 月島、急襲！妨害された修業！)	Directed by : Yasuhiro Kuroda; Storyboarded by : Tetsuhito Saito	Kazuyuki Fudeyasu	Natsuko Suzuki, Gi Nam Kim & Shigemi Aoyagi	December 13, 2011	July 20, 2014
Ichigo continues his training with Jackie. While at first Jackie overwhelms him with her more experienced powers, Ichigo is able to activate a power of Fullbring known as Bringer Light to gain the advantage. As they go on with the battle, Ichigo's powers go out of control, but insist that he can still fight despite Jackie's insistence that they stop. It is then that Tsukishima attacks Xcution, wanting to kill Ichigo. When Tsukishima cuts the fish tank containing Ichigo and Jackie, Ichigo appears, revealing the next stage of his Fullbring.
353	11	"Onwards to Battle! Ichigo, Mastering the Fullbring!"; Transliteration: "Gekitō e! Ichigo, Furuburingu o Tsukaikonase!" (Japanese: 激闘へ！一護、完現術(フルブリング)を使いこなせ！)	Junya Koshiba	Masahiro Okubo	Masaya Ōnishi	December 20, 2011	July 27, 2014
Ichigo, Chad and Xcution start their battle with Tsukishima. The battle is taken outside when Chad attacks Tsukishima before he reveals he was the one who attacked Uryū and Orihime, but Ichigo finds it out anyway. Enraged he starts to battle Tsukishima, but the expert Fullbringer overwhelms him. Ginjō then gets in the way and battles with Tsukishima instead, the two being more evenly matched. Yet Ichigo, who cannot just stand there and watch, attacks again and is able to land a hit, but is stopped by Yukio Hans Vorarlberna, who then proceeds to stop Tsukishima himself.
354	12	"Ichigo vs. Ginjō! To the Game's Space!"; Transliteration: "Ichigo tai Ginjō, Gēmu no Kūkan e!" (Japanese: 一護vs銀城、ゲームの空間へ！)	Directed by : Mitsutaka Noshitani; Storyboarded by : Yasuto Nishikata	Kazuyuki Fudeyasu	Yukari Takeuchi	December 27, 2011	August 3, 2014
While Ichigo is fully protected by Yukio's Fullbring, Chad, Ginjō and Riruka successfully manage to force Tsukishima to retreat. The group then moves to their second hideout to ponder what Tsukishima's motives really were, but they soon come to realize that they have been overthinking this. While Orihime heals Uryū, the two discuss the new threat but are unable to figure out if all the incidents so far were from the same culprit. Orihime later runs into Chad, who brings her back to the Xcution hideout to heal Ichigo, who has been training with Ginjō inside Yukio's Fullbring in a video game setting. Elsewhere, Urahara and Isshin plan to collect spiritual energy inside a vat with the help of a Soul Reaper, who is none other than Rukia Kuchiki.
355	13	"Shinigami at War! New Year in Seireitei Special!"; Transliteration: "Shinigami Sansen! Seireitei mo Oshōgatsu Supesharu!" (Japanese: 死神参戦！瀞霊廷もお正月SP(スペシャル)！)	Hiroki Takagi	Mio Imamura	Yoko Suzuki	January 10, 2012	August 10, 2014
During the time skip of the seventeen months, the Soul Reapers of the Soul Society celebrate the new year. Izuru Kira is tasked to organize a special event for this occasion, though at first he was reluctant to participate. He hosts a friendly kite-flying activity, but it slowly turns into a chaotic competition among many of the squad divisions. Kira attempts to stop the chaos, but his plan ultimately fails. Later on, Rukia prepares for an upcoming ceremonial dance her late sister had been in many years ago, but she is unimpressed with her own dancing abilities. Renji Abarai decides to help her out, but she gets angry when he later accidentally spills ink on her ceremonial kimono and tells him to leave. After Rukia is given her late sister's kimono instead, she realizes that Renji was trying to help relax her so she would not worry so much about the dance. Rukia sends a letter of apology to Renji, who was able to come to the dance which turns out to be a huge success.
356	14	"Friend or Foe?! Ginjō's True Intentions!"; Transliteration: "Teki ka Mikata ka!? Ginjō no Mienai Kokoro!" (Japanese: 敵か味方か!? 銀城の見えない心！)	Directed by : Geisei Morita; Storyboarded by : Takehiro Nakayama	Kento Shimoyama	Shuji Maruyama, Makoto Koga & Masaru Yamada	January 17, 2012	August 17, 2014
Ichigo continues his training with Ginjō while Orihime heals him. Yet when Ginjō blinds him and starts to say antagonastic things to make Ichigo angry, Ichigo begins to doubt Ginjō's true intentions. When Ginjō claims that he will kill Chad and Orihime, Ichigo is able to notice his spiritual pressure. Ichigo then manages to wound Ginjō with his Fullbring, reaching its final level, and Ginjō apologizes for his acting.
357	15	"Tsukishima's Ability...the Danger Is Drawing Near!"; Transliteration: "Shinobiyoru Kyōi...Tsukishima no Nōryoku!" (Japanese: 忍び寄る脅威…月島の能力！)	Directed by : Tadahito Matsubayashi; Storyboarded by : Noriyuki Abe	Kento Shimoyama	Sanae Shimada	January 24, 2012	August 24, 2014
After Ichigo achieves the final level of Fullbring, he spends his time perfecting it. With Xcution deciding to protect Ichigo so that they can complete their goal, Riruka goes to search Chad and Orihime, who are investigating Tsukishima. Riruka ends being ambushed by Tsukishima, who attacks her with his Fullbring. Tsukishima then confronts Chad and Orihime, who are unable to kill him as a result of his Fullbring causing him to be part of their memories.
358	16	"Clash?! Xcution Attacks Ginjō!"; Transliteration: "Gekitotsu!? Ginjō o Osou Ekusukyūshon!" (Japanese: 激突!? 銀城を襲うXCUTION！)	Directed by : Yasuto Nishikata; Storyboarded by : Yuzuru Tachikawa	Kazuyuki Fudeyasu	Tomomi Umemura	January 31, 2012	September 7, 2014
After Ichigo puts the finishing touches on completing his Fullbring, Ginjō tells him to go home to see his sisters, but Tsukishima activates his Fullbring that was placed on Ichigo's friends and sisters in order to make them believe that he is a close relative of the Kurosaki family. After running out, Ichigo encounters Ginjō, who tells Ichigo that all the other members of Xcution have fallen under Tsukishima's control.
359	17	"The Sorrowful Battle! Ichigo vs. Sado & Orihime"; Transliteration: "Kanashimi no Tatakai! Ichigo tai Sado to Orihime" (Japanese: 哀しみの戦い！一護vs茶渡&織姫！)	Directed by : Rokō Ogiwara; Storyboarded by : Tetsuhito Saito	Masahiro Okubo	Natsuko Suzuki & Gi Nam Kim	February 7, 2012	September 14, 2014
Ichigo and Ginjō, figuring out Tsukishima's Fullbring can manipulate the memories of the people he cuts down, are found out by Yukio, who brings them to Tsukishima's mansion. The two are welcomed by Ichigo's affected friends and sisters, but Ichigo, unable to fight with all of them in the crosshairs, runs away to a safer location, only to be stopped by the brainwashed Xcution. Ginjō destroys the staircase and takes on his fellow members himself while Ichigo fights Tsukishima. Ichigo is able to gain the upper hand with his Fullbring and severely injures Tsukishima's arm. However, Chad and Orihime, also affected, arrive and stop him from finishing Tsukishima off, as they explain how he has been a part of their lives from the start.
360	18	"Ichigo vs. Uryū?! Who Is the Traitor?!"; Transliteration: "Ichigo tai Uryū!? Uragiri-mono wa Dare da!" (Japanese: 一護vs雨竜!? 裏切り者は誰だ！)	Directed by : Ogura Shirakawa; Storyboarded by : Junya Koshiba	Masahiro Okubo	Masaya Ōnishi	February 14, 2012	September 21, 2014
Chad and Orihime, who believe Ichigo has gone crazy, try to prevent him from attacking Tsukishima, even when the fight is taken outside. Meanwhile, Ginjō, while confronting his fellow members, runs into trouble with Shishigawara and his lucky punches. An overwhelmed Ichigo is soon about to be slashed by Tsukishima, but Ginjō takes the hit instead. After Ginjō seems to be unaffected, Uryū suddenly arrives and claims that Ginjō was his assailant instead of Tsukishima. Before Ichigo can react, he is stuck down by Ginjō, who reveals that he allowed Tsukishima to slash him twice to return to his original self. He stabs Ichigo with his sword and says he will take Ichigo's Fullbring.
361	19	"A New Appearance! The Gotei 13 Arrives!"; Transliteration: "Arata na Sugata! Gotei Jūsan-tai, Kenzan!" (Japanese: 新たな姿！護廷十三隊、見参！)	Tadahito Matsubayashi	Kento Shimoyama	Masashi Kudo	February 21, 2012	September 28, 2014
Ginjō is able to take Ichigo's Fullbring and apply its power to his own. Unable to do anything about his situation, Ichigo falls deep into despair and runs after Ginjō, demanding for Ginjō to give him his power back. Ichigo is then impaled by a sword held by Rukia which causes him to become a Soul Reaper once again. The sword is revealed to possess the powers from the Thirteen Court Guard Squads in order to assist Ichigo in his fight against Ginjō. Ichigo attacks Ginjō with a Getsuga Tenshō, which is powerful enough to clear away a thunderstorm and slice Tsukishima's mansion in half.
362	20	"Revival! Substitute Shinigami: Ichigo Kurosaki!"; Transliteration: "Fukkatsu! Shinigami Daikō: Kurosaki Ichigo!" (Japanese: 復活！死神代行・黒崎一護！)	Directed by : Mitsutaka Noshitani; Storyboarded by : Yasuto Nishikata	Kazuyuki Fudeyasu	Yukari Takeuchi	February 28, 2012	October 5, 2014
Ichigo eventually overpowers Ginjō using his regained Soul Reaper powers and he also learns that he regained his powers, thanks to the spiritual energies given by all of the captains and lieutenants. Tōshirō Hitsugaya reveals that Ginjō was the first Substitute Soul Reaper. Meanwhile, Chad and Orihime rush to Ichigo, confused as to why Ginjō is being attacked. Tsukishima appears behind them and tries to break their minds by adding new memories to their past, but Urahara and Isshin knock them out. As promised, Ginjō gives the other Xcution members new powers of their own. Ichigo attempts to take them down, but Yukio uses his new powers to protect them and separate the others. Kenpachi Zaraki quickly takes care of Kutsuzawa and cuts him in half, killing him instantly.
363	21	"Fierce Fighting! Shinigami vs. Xcution!"; Transliteration: "Gekitō! Shinigami tai Ekusukyūshon!" (Japanese: 激闘！死神vsXCUTION！)	Directed by : Ogura Shirakawa; Storyboarded by : Junya Koshiba	Mio Imamura	Makoto Shimojima	March 6, 2012	October 12, 2014
Uryū comes to assist Ichigo in his battle against Ginjō. Byakuya Kuchiki prepares to start fighting Tsukishima while Riruka ambushes Rukia using stuffed animals. Renji encounters Jackie and defeats her without the use of his zanpakutō Zobimaru, having trained to fight an opponent at Aizen's level. As Yukio then attempts to destroy the dimension where Renji and Jackie are situated, he is confronted by Hitsugaya. Hitsugaya manages to capture Yukio in ice and attempts to force him to free his comrades. Meanwhile, Ikkaku Madarame confronts Shishigawara, managing to find his Fullbring's weakness and overpower him.
364	22	"Desperate Struggle?! Byakuya's Troubled Memories"; Transliteration: "Zettai Zetsumei!? Kako o Hasamareta Byakuya" (Japanese: 絶体絶命!? 過去を挟まれた白哉)	Directed by : Rokō Ogiwara; Storyboarded by : Tadahito Matsubayashi	Mio Imamura	Natsuko Suzuki & Yukari Takeuchi	March 13, 2012	October 19, 2014
Tsukishima, revealing that he can use his Fullbring on inanimate objects as well, hits Byakuya's zanpakuto, thus learning all he needs to know about Byakuya's weaknesses. Meanwhile, Rukia fights against Riruka and gets her body trapped in a stuffed animal, and attempting to fight with kido was ineffective. Riruka tells about how the Fullbringers, through their tragic childhood pasts, were gathered together to form Xcution. Using this distraction as an opportunity, Rukia touches Riruka with her zanpakuto, but Riruka, unable to dodge Rukia, uses a special ability from her Fullbring to vanish while causing Rukia to collapse. Meanwhile, Tsukishima is able to overwhelm Byakuya and manages to inflict a serious injury. However, Byakuya shoots out his bankai from his hand, piercing Tsukishima's chest. Before Tsukishima falls to the ground, Byakuya thanks him for an exciting battle.
365	23	"Ichigo vs. Ginjō! Secret of the Substitute Badge"; Transliteration: "Ichigo tai Ginjō! Daikōshō no Himitsu" (Japanese: 一護vs銀城！代行証の秘密)	Directed by : Kazunori Mizuno; Storyboarded by : Junya Koshiba & Tetsuhito Saito	Kento Shimoyama	Sanae Shimada & Masaya Ōnishi	March 20, 2012	October 26, 2014
Ichigo and Uryū continue their battle with Ginjō. However, when Ginjō senses that Tsukishima is near death, he tells Ichigo they have no longer have a reason to fight while revealing that the Substitute Soul Reapers have been constantly spied on by the Soul Society to monitor their actions. However, using his bankai to destroy the dimension with the other Soul Reapers looking on, Ichigo admits knowing about the revelation yet still intends to trust the Soul Society for aiding him in protecting the people close to him. This has Ginjō releases his own bankai in response to Ichigo's resolve as the two have a final clash.
366	24	"Changing History, Unchanging Heart"; Transliteration: "Kawariyuku Rekishi, Kawaranu Kokoro" (Japanese: 変わりゆく歴史、変わらぬ心)	Yasuto Nishikata & Noriyuki Abe	Kento Shimoyama	Yoko Suzuki & Tomomi Umemura	March 27, 2012	November 2, 2014
The final battle between Ichigo and Ginjō comes to climax when the latter receives a mortal wound. Just as Ginjō is about to die, the dying Tsukishima tries to kill Ichigo but is stopped by Riruka as she emerges from Rukia's body. Shishigawa proceeds to carry Tsukishima away who dies by his injuries while the other surviving Xcution members decide to separate. Ichigo later returns to the Soul Society and requests that Genryūsai Shigekuni Yamamoto let Ginjō's body be buried within the human world as the last thing he can do for him. Yamamoto agrees just as Ichigo accepts to continue being an official Substitute Soul Reaper. Rukia sees Ichigo off, recalling their time together and silently thanks him. The series conclude with Ichigo returning to Karakura Town where he is greeted by his friends and family.

== Home media release ==
=== Japanese ===
Lost Agent arc
Vol.	Release date	Episodes
1	August 22, 2012	343–346
2	September 26, 2012	347–350
3	October 24, 2012	351–354
4	November 21, 2012	355–358
5	December 19, 2012	359–362
6	January 23, 2013	363–366

=== English ===
Viz Media (Region 1)
Vol.	Release date	Episodes
25	June 23, 2015	343–354
26	September 29, 2015	355–366

Manga Entertainment (Region 2)
Series	Release date		Episodes	Arc
16	July 20, 2015 (Part 1)	February 6, 2017 (Complete)	343–354	The Lost Agent
16	September 28, 2015 (Part 2)	February 6, 2017 (Complete)	355–366	The Lost Agent

Madman Entertainment (Region 4)
Collection	Release date	Episodes
26	August 5, 2015	343–354
27	November 18, 2015	355–366
