= Across the Border (song) =

Single by Vivid
- Released: February 17, 2010
- Genre: Rock
- Length: 17:40
- Label: PS Company

Alternate covers
- Limited Edition B CD Cover

Alternative cover
- Regular Edition CD Cover

Across The Border is the third single released by the Japanese band Vivid. This was released in three different versions: a limited CD+DVD edition, a limited CD only edition, and a regular CD only edition. Limited edition A came with a DVD of the title song's PV, while limited edition B came with a 16-page booklet and the B-side track "feast of the moon". The regular edition came with the B-side track "Twilight". The limited editions have only 3,000 copies each. The single reached number 22 on the Oricon weekly charts, where it charted for three weeks, selling 5,958 copies.

== Track listing ==
Limited edition A CD+DVD – CD track list
No.	Title	Length
1.	"Across The Border"	4:40
2.	"Yume no Michishirube" (夢ノミチシルベ; The Guidepost of Dreams)	4:29

Limited edition A CD+DVD – DVD track list
No.	Title	Length
1.	"Across The Border" (PV)

Limited edition B CD – CD track list
No.	Title	Length
1.	"Across The Border"	4:40
2.	"feast of the moon"	4:20
3.	"Yume no Michishirube" (夢ノミチシルベ; The Guidepost of Dreams)	4:29

Regular edition CD – CD track list
No.	Title	Length
1.	"Across The Border"	4:40
2.	"Twilight" (トワイライト; Twilight)	4:14
3.	"Yume no Michishirube" (夢ノミチシルベ; The Guidepost of Dreams)	4:29
