= Bleach season 1 =

Season of television series

Bleach
- Season 1
- The cover of the first DVD compilation released by Viz Media, which was nominated for best package design at the American Anime Awards, featuring Ichigo Kurosaki.
- No. of episodes: 20

Release
- Original network: TV Tokyo
- Original release: October 5, 2004 – February 22, 2005

Season chronology
- Next → Season 2

The Substitute Shinigami arc (死神代行篇, Shinigami Daikō-hen) is the first season of the Bleach anime television series. The episodes are directed by Noriyuki Abe, and produced by TV Tokyo, Dentsu, and Studio Pierrot. In the English release by Viz Media, the title is changed to simply The Substitute. The season adapts the first eight volumes (chapters 1–70) of Tite Kubo's Bleach manga series, spanning twenty episodes. The episodes' plot covers the adventures of a high school student Ichigo Kurosaki after becoming a Soul Reaper and assuming the duties of Soul Reaper Rukia Kuchiki.

The first season aired from October 2004 to February 2005 on TV Tokyo. The first English airing of the series was from September 2006 to January 2007. It was shown on YTV's Bionix programming block in Canada and Cartoon Network's Adult Swim in the United States, with Bionix airing the show one day sooner. The arc started airing in the United Kingdom starting in September 2007 on AnimeCentral.

The episodes use three pieces of theme music: one opening theme and two ending themes. The opening theme is Orange Range's single "Asterisk". The ending theme for the first thirteen episodes is "Life is Like a Boat" by Rie Fu, while the remaining seven used "Thank You!!" by Home Made Kazoku.

The arc was released on five DVD compilations, each containing four episodes of the show. They were released in Japan from February 2 to June 1, 2005. Viz Media's release of the DVDs was made from November 5 to July 31, 2007. The first of these compilations, with art featuring the series main character Ichigo Kurosaki, was nominated at the American Anime Awards in 2007 for best DVD package design. A DVD collection box, containing all twenty episodes of the arc, was released by Viz Media on October 30, 2007. Manga Entertainment released two DVDs containing the first season in the United Kingdom on November 5, 2007, and March 3, 2008. A compilation of these two volumes was released on May 5, 2008.

== Episodes ==
No. overall	No. in season	Title	Directed by (Note: Production staff information is taken from the ending credits of each episode.)	Written by	Storyboarded by	Original release date	English air date
1	1	"The Day I Became a Shinigami"; Transliteration: "Shinigami ni Natchatta Hi" (Japanese: 死神になっちゃった日)	Noriyuki Abe	Masashi Sogo	Noriyuki Abe	October 5, 2004	September 10, 2006
Ichigo Kurosaki is a fifteen-year-old high school student with orange hair, brown eyes, and the ability to see spirits. As he tries to protect the spirit of a little girl from a hollow, he witnesses a clash between the malevolent spirit and a female Soul Reaper. Later, Ichigo is met by the same woman again in his room. She introduces herself as Rukia Kuchiki, and explains to Ichigo the basic duty of the Soul Reapers is the act of soul cleansing. The hollow, named Fishbone D, returns to absorb Ichigo's high spiritual energy, attacking Ichigo's home, and Rukia is wounded. In order to save his family, Ichigo desperately takes Rukia's power into himself and becomes a Soul Reaper to successfully defeat the hollow.
2	2	"A Shinigami's Work"; Transliteration: "Shinigami no Oshigoto" (Japanese: 死神のお仕事)	Jun'ya Koshiba	Natsuko Takahashi	Jun'ya Koshiba	October 12, 2004	September 17, 2006
After discovering Rukia has enrolled in his class, Ichigo learns that she has lost her power and that he must pose as her substitute, until her powers can recover. Although he refuses this responsibility at first, Ichigo eventually accepts after realizing he cannot just turn a blind eye if he encounters a hollow again.
3	3	"The Older Brother's Wish, the Younger Sister's Wish"; Transliteration: "Ani no Negai, Imōto no Negai" (Japanese: 兄の願い、妹の願い)	Shigeki Hatakeyama	Natsuko Takahashi	Noriyuki Abe	October 19, 2004	September 24, 2006
Ichigo discovers that one of his schoolmates, Orihime Inoue, is being stalked by her older brother's spirit who turned into the hollow Acidwire due to Orihime stopping her prayers for him, which makes him hesitate to fulfill his duty. As Ichigo is forced to use his power again, his qualms of killing hollows are rested and he finally submits to his purpose as a substitute Soul Reaper, killing Acidwire. Before he does so however, Orihime's older brother was able to revert to his kind and gentle nature, expressing his love for her and thanking her before being sent to the Soul Society, the place where Soul Reapers and souls reside, via Ichigo's zanpakuto.
4	4	"Cursed Parakeet"; Transliteration: "Noroi no Inko" (Japanese: 呪いのインコ)	Takuji Kimura	Genki Yoshimura	Hidehito Ueda	October 26, 2004	October 1, 2006
Ichigo's friend Yasutora "Chad" Sado comes into possession of a cursed cockatiel that is inhabited by the soul of a small boy, Yui'ichi Shibata, but supposed misfortune to anyone who possesses the cockatiel is due to a hollow named Shrieker who has been stalking the boy's soul. Chad is attacked by Shrieker before Rukia arrives to aid him.
5	5	"Beat the Invisible Enemy!"; Transliteration: "Mienai Teki o Nagure!" (Japanese: 見えない敵を殴れ！)	Kazunori Mizuno	Genki Yoshimura	Tetsuhito Saitō	November 2, 2004	October 8, 2006
With Rukia's help, Chad fights Shrieker despite not being able to see him. Ichigo eventually arrives and defeats the Shrieker. But as Shrieker was originally a murderer in life, he is dragged through the Gates of Hell instead of dissolving into the Soul Society. The spirit that inhabited the cockatiel is released to move on to the Soul Society.
6	6	"Fight to the Death! Ichigo vs. Ichigo"; Transliteration: "Shitō! Ichigo vs. Ichigo" (Japanese: 死闘！一護VSイチゴ)	Jun'ya Koshiba	Michiko Yokote	Motosuke Takahashi	November 9, 2004	October 15, 2006
In order for Ichigo to transform into a Soul Reaper when Rukia is not around, she purchases some soul candy from the Urahara Shop for him. However, the candy is actually a modsoul, an artificial warrior from the Soul Society created to destroy hollows. Once inside Ichigo's body, the modsoul goes on a rampage while ruining Ichigo's social image and turning pevert.
7	7	"Greetings from a Stuffed Lion"; Transliteration: "Nuigurumi kara Konnichiwa" (Japanese: ぬいぐるみからコンにちは)	Akira Shimizu	Michiko Yokote & Masashi Sogo	Motosuke Takahashi & Shigeki Hatakeyama	November 16, 2004	October 22, 2006
Ichigo confronts the mad modsoul possessing his body, but is then distracted by an emerging hollow. Together, they defeat the hollow. When Kisuke Urahara, the merchant who sold Rukia her gigai, comes for the "defective" merchandise, Ichigo takes the modsoul back and places him into a stuffed lion plushie while naming him "Kon" to get even with him wounding his shoulder. Meanwhile in the Soul Society, a Soul Reaper is sent to track down Rukia for retrieval.
8	8	"June 17, Memories in the Rain"; Transliteration: "Roku-gatsu Jūshichi-nichi, Ame no Kioku" (Japanese: 6月17日、雨の記憶)	Shigeki Hatakeyama	Masashi Sogo	Noriyuki Abe	November 23, 2004	October 29, 2006
Ichigo and his family visit their mother's grave on the anniversary of her death. While there, the Soul Reaper sent to retrieve Rukia attacks them because she broke the Soul Society's laws by giving Ichigo her powers. The battle halts when Ichigo's sisters Karin and Yuzu are attacked by a huge hollow.
9	9	"Unbeatable Enemy"; Transliteration: "Taosenai Teki" (Japanese: 倒せない敵)	Takuji Kimura	Masashi Sogo	Sanzō Tsunoda	November 30, 2004	November 5, 2006
Ichigo confronts the hollow, who is revealed as the Grand Fisher, the hollow who killed Ichigo's mother. In a fit of rage, Ichigo defeats the hollow as he escapes before he is killed. The Soul Reaper sent after Rukia leaves with a warning when he witnesses Ichigo's strength.
10	10	"Assault on Trip at Sacred Ground!"; Transliteration: "Burari Reijō Totsugeki no Tabi!" (Japanese: ぶらり霊場突撃の旅！)	Kazunori Mizuno	Masahiro Ōkubo	Kazunori Mizuno	December 7, 2004	November 12, 2006
When popular TV star/spirit medium Don Kanonji transforms a spirit into a hollow during an exorcism, Ichigo is forced to clean up the mess. Upon the hollow's defeat, Kanonji is shocked to realize what he has done. With a little cheering-up from Ichigo, Kanonji is back to his old self again, and calls Ichigo, despite Ichigo's objections, his new apprentice.
11	11	"The Legendary Quincy"; Transliteration: "Densetsu no Kuinshī" (Japanese: 伝説のクインシー)	Jun'ya Koshiba	Michiko Yokote	Jun'ya Koshiba	December 14, 2004	November 19, 2006
While on another hollow fighting mission, Ichigo encounters Uryū Ishida, a classmate belonging to a clan known as the Quincy, humans that can use spiritual power to manifest a bow to fight hollows. Uryū declares himself an enemy of all Soul Reapers and challenges Ichigo to a competition of hunting hollows.
12	12	"A Gentle Right Arm"; Transliteration: "Yasashii Migiude" (Japanese: やさしい右腕)	Kōji Aritomi	Genki Yoshimura	Kōji Aritomi	December 21, 2004	November 26, 2006
The contest between Ichigo and Uryū has lured hundreds of hollows into Karakura Town, endangering many of Ichigo's friends. Chad is forced to fight a hollow in order to save Karin. During the battle, he finally can see the hollow clearly, and develops a new ability, an armored right arm capable of firing energy blasts called "The Right Arm of the Giant".
13	13	"Flower and Hollow"; Transliteration: "Hana to Horō" (Japanese: 花とホロウ)	Takuji Kimura	Natsuko Takahashi	Sanzō Tsunoda	December 28, 2004	December 3, 2006
The situation worsens as more hollows appear in the human world, attacking the school where Orihime and her friends are. While defending them, Orihime develops her own power, the Shun Shun Rikka, a group of fairy-like creatures coming from the hairpins given to her by her brother, and defeats the hollow. Afterward, Urahara takes in Orihime and Chad to help them with their new powers while Rukia and Ichigo confront Uryū.
14	14	"Back to Back, a Fight to the Death!"; Transliteration: "Senaka Awase no Shitō!" (Japanese: 背中合わせの死闘！)	Noriyuki Abe	Masashi Sogo	Tetsuhito Saitō	January 11, 2005	December 10, 2006
The legion of hollows force Ichigo and Uryū to team up in combat while the others watch. A giant hollow called a Menos Grande arrives on the scene, and is driven away after Ichigo inflicts a wound assisted by power from Uryū. However, he releases too much spiritual power in the process. The strain of his powers causes Ichigo to lose consciousness, and Uryū saves him by releasing the excess energy through his bow.
15	15	"Kon's Great Plan"; Transliteration: "Kon no Uhauha Daisakusen" (Japanese: コンのウハウハ大作戦)	Chiaki Kon	Masahiro Ōkubo	Chiaki Kon	January 18, 2005	December 17, 2006
Tired of mistreatment from Ichigo, Kon runs away to find a better owner, but he finds his abuse continuing from girls due to his perverse nature. Ichigo makes an effort to befriend Uryū but is rebuffed. Rukia becomes conflicted with her attachment with humans. Rather than endanger Ichigo, she runs away to face the newly-arrived hunters from the Soul Society. Ichigo chases after Rukia only to encounter the two Soul Reapers pursuing her.
16	16	"The Encounter, Abarai Renji!"; Transliteration: "Abarai Renji, Kenzan!" (Japanese: 阿散井恋次、見参！)	Jun'ya Koshiba	Michiko Yokote	Motosuke Takahashi	January 25, 2005	January 7, 2007
Ichigo faces off against the Soul Reaper Lieutenant Renji Abarai. Renji triggers the Shikai state of his zanpakutō, overwhelming Ichigo with his strength.
17	17	"Ichigo Dies!"; Transliteration: "Ichigo, Shisu!" (Japanese: 一護、死す！)	Kazunori Mizuno	Rika Nakase	Manabu Fukazawa	February 1, 2005	January 14, 2007
Ichigo makes a comeback against Renji, overpowering him with his enormous spirit energy. Just when Renji is about to fall, his commander Byakuya Kuchiki, Rukia's brother, steps in and defeats Ichigo with overwhelming pace. Rukia returns to the Soul Society so that Ichigo can be spared death, and Ichigo is left dying with his power stripped from him. He is then saved by Urahara, who agrees to help him rescue Rukia, who faces the death penalty in the Soul Society. Ichigo, however, must agree to train with Urahara to regain his powers.
18	18	"Reclaim! The Power of the Shinigami!"; Transliteration: "Torimodose! Shinigami no Chikara!" (Japanese: 取り戻せ！死神の力！)	Akira Shimizu	Natsuko Takahashi	Jun'ya Koshiba	February 8, 2005	January 21, 2007
As his last day of school ends, Ichigo is upset to discover that no one except for Orihime, Chad and Uryū seems to remember Rukia, due to a mind wipe imposed by the Soul Society. He begins his training at the Urahara Shop, first battling the shop's girl assistant, Ururu Tsumugiya to regain control of his spirit body. As the training enters stage two, Ichigo's soul is cut from his body and thrown into a pit. He must regain his Soul Reaper powers within three days, or risk becoming a hollow. Meanwhile, Yoruichi Shihōin, a talking cat, offers to train Chad and Orihime to control and enhance their powers so they can join Ichigo to go to the Soul Society and rescue Rukia.
19	19	"Ichigo Becomes a Hollow!"; Transliteration: "Ichigo, Horō ni Ochiru!" (Japanese: 一護、ホロウに墜ちる！)	Takuji Kimura	Genki Yoshimura	Tetsuhito Saitō	February 15, 2005	January 28, 2007
In the Soul Society, Rukia's sentence is moved up and she only has twenty five days left. In the pit, Ichigo battles through the agony of the process of becoming a hollow. His transformation is almost complete as he enters his own mind, coming face to face with his inner spirit, Zangetsu, who helps him unleash the Soul Reaper powers he was born with. In a powerful display, Ichigo emerges from the pit with his Soul Reaper uniform on, wearing the mask of a hollow. Breaking the mask off, Ichigo enters the next stage of his training, that is to fight Urahara.
20	20	"Ichimaru Gin's Shadow"; Transliteration: "Ichimaru Gin no Kage" (Japanese: 市丸ギンの影)	Shigeki Hatakeyama	Masashi Sogo	Shigeki Hatakeyama	February 22, 2005	February 4, 2007
While fighting Urahara, Ichigo learns that Zangetsu is the name of his zanpakutō. Upon learning the name, the sword transforms into its more powerful Shikai as Ichigo unleashes an energy blast which knocks off Urahara's hat, completing the third stage in his training. Orihime and Chad, meanwhile, finish their training with Yoruichi. The entire group, including Uryū, who has been training alone, set out for the Soul Society using a gate that Yoruichi and Urahara made.
