= Bleach season 2 =

Season of television series

Bleach
- Season 2
- The cover of the first DVD compilation of The Entry arc released by Aniplex, featuring Ichigo Kurosaki
- No. of episodes: 21

Release
- Original network: TV Tokyo
- Original release: March 1 – July 19, 2005

Season chronology
- ← Previous; Season 1 Next → Season 3

The Soul Society: The Sneak Entry arc (尸魂界(ソウル・ソサエティ)・潜入篇, Sōru Sosaeti: Sennyū-hen) is the second season of the Bleach anime television series, containing 21 episodes. The episodes are directed by Noriyuki Abe, and produced by TV Tokyo, Dentsu, and Studio Pierrot. In the English release by Viz Media, the title is changed to simply The Entry. The season adapts Tite Kubo's Bleach manga series from the 9th volume to the 14th volume (chapters 71–117), with the exception of episode 33 (filler). The season follows Ichigo Kurosaki and his friends, who infiltrate the Soul Society to save Soul Reaper Rukia Kuchiki from her impending execution for transferring her Soul Reaper powers to a human substitute.

The season aired from March to July 2005 on TV Tokyo. The first English airing of the series lasted from February to July 2007. It was shown on YTV's Bionix programming block in Canada and Cartoon Network's Adult Swim in the United States.

The episodes use five pieces of theme music: two opening themes and three ending themes. The opening theme for the first five episodes is Orange Range's single "Asterisk"; the rest use "D-tecnoLife" by Uverworld. The initial ending theme is "Thank You!!" by Home Made Kazoku, switching at episode 26 to Younha's "Houkiboshi" (ほうき星; lit. Shooting Star) and again at episode 39 to "HappyPeople" by Skoop on Somebody.

Five DVD compilations, each containing four episodes of the season, have been released by Aniplex between July 27 and November 23, 2005. The DVDs of the English adaptation of the series are distributed by Viz Media; five DVD compilations, each containing four episodes of the season, have been released by Viz Media between September 25, 2007, and May 20, 2008. In the United Kingdom, Manga Entertainment released the season in two DVD volumes on June 30 and November 3, 2008. A compilation of these two volumes was released on December 29, 2008.

== Episodes ==
No. overall	No. in season	Title	Directed by (Note: Production staff information is taken from the ending credits of each episode.)	Written by	Storyboarded by	Original release date	English air date
21	1	"Enter! The World of the Shinigami"; Transliteration: "Totsunyū! Shinigami no Sekai" (Japanese: 突入！死神の世界)	Jun'ya Koshiba	Rika Nakase	Jun'ya Koshiba	March 1, 2005	February 11, 2007
Ichigo Kurosaki, Uryū Ishida, Orihime Inoue, Yasutora "Chad" Sado and Yoruichi Shihōin cross over into the Soul Society using the gate. They arrive in the Rukon District, where normal spirits reside. Ichigo quickly finds himself in a battle with the gatekeeper Jidanbō when he carelessly tries to enter the Seireitei, where the Soul Reapers reside. Thanks to Urahara's training, Ichigo easily defeats Jidanbō, but when Jidanbō opens the gate in defeat, Ichigo encounters the Squad Three captain Gin Ichimaru.
22	2	"The Man Who Hates Shinigami"; Transliteration: "Shinigami o Nikumu Otoko" (Japanese: 死神を憎む男)	Kōji Aritomi	Natsuko Takahashi	Kōji Aritomi	March 8, 2005	February 18, 2007
Ichimaru uses his shikai and pushes Ichigo back through the gate. After being "shot" out of the Seireitei by Ichimaru, Ichigo and his friends must find another way in. While searching for a friend of Yoruichi's who supposedly can help, Ichigo meets Ganju Shiba, a man who claims to be the number one hater of Soul Reapers of the west part of the Rukon District. The two hate each other immediately and begin to brawl, but their battle ends abruptly when the clock on the back of one of Ganju's friends goes off. Ganju and his friends leave immediately.
23	3	"14 Days Before Rukia's Execution"; Transliteration: "Rukia Shokei, Jūyokka Mae" (Japanese: ルキア処刑、14日前)	Kazunori Mizuno	Masahiro Ōkubo	Kazunori Mizuno	March 15, 2005	February 25, 2007
Yoruichi solicits the help of Ganju's sister, Kūkaku Shiba, who agrees to send them into the Seireitei using her fireworks cannon. Meanwhile, Rukia's sentence has been moved to fourteen days, and she is transferred into a cell called the Shrine of Penitence. Meanwhile, an emergency meeting is called among all the captains of the Thirteen Court Guard Squads.
24	4	"Assemble! The 13 Divisions"; Transliteration: "Kesshū! Gotei Jūsantai" (Japanese: 結集！護廷13隊)	Akira Iwanaga	Michiko Yokote	Sanzō Tsunoda	March 22, 2005	March 4, 2007
In order to use the cannon to enter the Seireitei, Ichigo and his friends must first learn how to focus their spiritual energies in order to use an item called a Spirit Orb, a task Ichigo finds especially difficult. He finally succeeds with the help of Ganju and creates the shell he will need to ride the cannon. Within the Seireitei a meeting of all the captains in the Thirteen Court Guard Squads is held to discuss how to deal with the invaders. The meeting is interrupted by an alarm, indicating that someone has infiltrated the Seireitei.
25	5	"Penetrate the Center with an Enormous Bombshell?"; Transliteration: "Kyodai Hōdan de Chūō Toppa?" (Japanese: 巨大砲弾で中央突破？)	Akira Shimizu	Genki Yoshimura	Tetsuhito Saitō	March 29, 2005	March 11, 2007
Before the group launches into the Seireitei, Ganju reveals that the reason he hates Soul Reapers is because his brother was killed by one. In the Seireitei, the Squad Eleven captain, Kenpachi Zaraki, sets out to hunt Ichigo, believing him to be a worthy opponent. Meanwhile, Squad Five captain Sousuke Aizen confronts Ichimaru in front of the Squad Ten captain Tōshirō Hitsugaya about his flimsy excuse for allowing the invaders to escape, causing Hitsugaya to suspect that Ichimaru is planning something. As the crew passes through the shield surrounding the Seireitei, Ichigo's inability to control his spiritual energy results in the shell exploding, separating the group.
26	6	"Formation! The Worst Tag"; Transliteration: "Kessei! Saiaku no Taggu" (Japanese: 結成！最悪のタッグ)	Takuji Kimura	Masashi Sogo	Noriyuki Abe	April 5, 2005	March 18, 2007
Ichigo lands with Ganju, and Uryū with Orihime, while Chad and Yoruichi are alone. Ichigo and Ganju encounter and fight Squad Eleven members, Third Seat Ikkaku Madarame and Fifth Seat Yumichika Ayasegawa respectively. Ikkaku gains an advantage by using the shikai of his zanpakutō to fight Ichigo while Ganju attempts to escape from Yumichika using a series of tricks and fireworks he borrowed from his sister.
27	7	"Release the Death Blow!"; Transliteration: "Hissatsu no Ichigeki o Hanate!" (Japanese: 必殺の一撃を放て！)	Jun'ya Koshiba	Masashi Sogo	Jun'ya Koshiba	April 12, 2005	March 25, 2007
Ichigo eventually overpowers Ikkaku, although he is injured in the process. Ganju and Yumichika continue their fight, with Yumichika pursuing Ganju throughout the Seireitei. Kenpachi continues to search for Ichigo, but is lost, thanks to the poor directions of his lieutenant, Yachiru Kusajishi.
28	8	"Orihime Targeted"; Transliteration: "Nerawareta Orihime" (Japanese: 狙われた織姫)	Keizō Kusakawa	Rika Nakase	Kōji Aritomi	April 19, 2005	April 8, 2007
Ganju manages to defeat Yumichika by exploding fireworks on his face. Meanwhile, Uryū and Orihime are confronted by Jirōbō Ikkanzaka, the Fourth Seat of Squad Seven. Uryū is easily able to destroy the projectiles he sends at them, and destroys his ability to be a Soul Reaper when he threatens Orihime. Meanwhile, the Squad Twelve captain, Mayuri Kurotsuchi, dispatches teams of Soul Reapers to locate the intruders as he wishes to use them as his test subjects for his horrifying experiments.
29	9	"Breakthrough! The Shinigami's Encompassing Net"; Transliteration: "Toppa seyo! Shinigami Hōimō" (Japanese: 突破せよ！死神包囲網)	Shigeki Hatakeyama	Michiko Yokote	Shigeki Hatakeyama	April 26, 2005	April 15, 2007
Ichigo and Ganju attempt to escape the Soul Reapers following them by using Hanatarō Yamada, a Squad Four officer, as a distraction. They fail, but the Soul Reapers are distracted by Chad's energy blasts elsewhere, enabling them to escape. Hanatarō then promises to take Ichigo and Ganju to Rukia as he is a friend of hers too. Kenpachi is still attempting to find Ichigo, but Yachiru's directions are leading him in the opposite direction. He then visits Ikkaku in the hospital and stops Mayuri from attacking Ikkaku when the latter refuses to answer any questions. As Mayuri leaves, Ikkaku tells his captain about Ichigo.
30	10	"Renji's Confrontation"; Transliteration: "Tachihadakaru Renji" (Japanese: 立ちはだかる恋次)	Jun'ya Koshiba	Masahiro Ōkubo	Motosuke Takahashi	May 3, 2005	April 22, 2007
With Hanatarō's help, Ichigo and Ganju begin to head towards Rukia's location. However, Renji confronts them. Ichigo begins to fight him, and Renji reveals that he is five times more powerful than when they fought previously as Soul Reapers have limits placed on their powers when they go to the World of the Living.
31	11	"The Resolution to Kill"; Transliteration: "Kiru Tame no Kakugo" (Japanese: 斬る為の覚悟)	Kazunori Mizuno	Natsuko Takahashi	Tetsuhito Saitō	May 10, 2005	April 29, 2007
Ichigo and Renji fight viciously, with Renji initially gaining the advantage. However, Ichigo reflects on his training with Urahara, and uses his "resolve" to fire a blast of spiritual energy at Renji, defeating him.
32	12	"Stars and the Stray"; Transliteration: "Hoshi to Norainu" (Japanese: 星と野良犬)	Takuji Kimura	Genki Yoshimura	Noriyuki Abe	May 17, 2005	May 6, 2007
Renji reflects on his past with Rukia, remembering how they were childhood friends, and how they joined the Soul Reaper Academy together. However, they steadily grew more separated, and he stopped interfering with her after she was adopted by the Kuchiki clan. After reminiscing, he begs Ichigo to save her.
33	13	"Miracle! The Mysterious New Hero"; Transliteration: "Kiseki! Nazo no Shin Hīrō" (Japanese: 奇跡！謎の新ヒーロー)	Chiaki Kon	Masahiro Ōkubo	Chiaki Kon	May 26, 2005	May 13, 2007
Karin Kurosaki successfully destroys a hollow with her soccer ball after it falls from the sky, along with a kitten's soul. Elsewhere, Ururu Tsumugiya and Jinta Hanakari see a hollow and destroy it. At the park, Kanonji informs the group that he intends to form a team of heroes, the Karakura Superheroes. Later, the kitten shields Yuzu Kurosaki as more hollows attack her, and the minor hollows around them meld into one larger hollow. With help from the kitten, the Karakura Superheroes defeat the hollow.
34	14	"Tragedy of Dawn"; Transliteration: "Yoake no Sangeki" (Japanese: 夜明けの惨劇)	Kōji Aritomi	Natsuko Takahashi	Kōji Aritomi	June 1, 2005	May 20, 2007
Hanatarō and Ganju carry Ichigo away as the Soul Reapers arrive and Hanatarō begins to heal Ichigo in the tunnels. Renji, despite being heavily injured, is incarcerated on the orders of his captain, Byakuya Kuchiki. Meanwhile, the Head Captain of the Soul Reapers Genryusai Yamamoto commands all-out war against the intruders. As Squad Five lieutenant Momo Hinamori travels to a meeting of lieutenants the following day, she finds Aizen's body, hanging from a tower.
35	15	"Aizen Assassinated! The Darkness Which Approaches"; Transliteration: "Aizen Ansatsu! Shinobiyoru Yami" (Japanese: 藍染暗殺！忍び寄る闇)	Jun'ya Koshiba	Masashi Sogo	Jun'ya Koshiba	June 7, 2005	May 27, 2007
Believing that Ichimaru murdered Aizen, Hinamori attacks him, but is stopped by Squad Three lieutenant Izuru Kira. Hitsugaya stops their fight, and orders both to be incarcerated. He then promises to kill Ichimaru if he harms Hinamori in any way. Chad continues through the Seireitei, but the Squad Eight captain, Shunsui Kyōraku, decides to stop him. Ichigo, Ganju and Hanatarō travel towards Rukia's prison, but are immobilized by Kenpachi's immense spiritual force.
36	16	"Zaraki Kenpachi Approaches!"; Transliteration: "Zaraki Kenpachi, Semaru!" (Japanese: 更木剣八、迫る！)	Shigeki Hatakeyama	Rika Nakase	Shigeki Hatakeyama	June 14, 2005	June 10, 2007
The Squad Ten lieutenant, Rangiku Matsumoto, gives Hinamori a letter from Aizen, which discloses the true identity of his murderer. Meanwhile, Ichigo begins to fight Kenpachi. However, Kenpachi's spiritual energy is so great that Ichigo cannot even cut him.
37	17	"Motive of the Fist"; Transliteration: "Kobushi no Riyū" (Japanese: 拳の理由)	Kazunori Mizuno	Michiko Yokote	Kazunori Mizuno (Note: Credited under the pen name "Ōkura Shirakawa" (白川 巨椋, Shirakawa Ōkura))	June 21, 2005	June 17, 2007
As Chad continues through the Soul Society, he encounters members of Squad Eight. He manages to defeat them all until Kyōraku confronts him. Although Chad is determined to win to uphold his promise to Ichigo, Kyōraku easily, albeit regretfully, defeats him.
38	18	"Desperation! The Broken Zangetsu"; Transliteration: "Zettaizetsumei! Orareta Zangetsu" (Japanese: 絶体絶命! 折られた斬月)	Mitsutaka Noshitani	Genki Yoshimura	Tetsuhito Saitō	June 28, 2005	June 24, 2007
Rather than kill him, Kyōraku orders Chad to be incarcerated. Elsewhere, Ichigo is fleeing Kenpachi, terrified of Kenpachi's overwhelming power. After realizing the importance of his mission, however, Ichigo finds the resolve to face him. He manages to cut Kenpachi, but becomes overconfident after learning that Kenpachi has not mastered his zanpakutō. Kenpachi then stabs him in the chest, breaking Ichigo's zanpakutō in the process.
39	19	"The Immortal Man"; Transliteration: "Fujimi no Otoko" (Japanese: 不死身の男)	Noriyuki Abe	Rika Nakase	Tetsuhito Saitō	July 5, 2005	July 1, 2007
Zangetsu, the spirit of Ichigo's zanpakutō, brings Ichigo into his world. Through fighting a hollow version of himself, Ichigo realizes that zanpakutō are more than mere tools, and that simply knowing name of his zanpakutō does not make him more powerful. Ichigo is then able to fight Kenpachi on equal footing, and as the two clash in a massive strike, Ichigo collapses.
40	20	"The Shinigami Whom Ganju Met"; Transliteration: "Ganju no Mita Shinigami" (Japanese: 岩鷲の見た死神)	Ryō Miyata	Masashi Sogo	Sanzō Tsunoda	July 12, 2005	July 8, 2007
Kenpachi falls down beside Ichigo in defeat, and Yachiru takes him away for medical treatment. Yoruichi also retrieves Ichigo for medical treatment. Meanwhile, Ganju and Hanatarō arrive at Rukia's cell, but Ganju becomes infuriated because he believes Rukia was the killer of his brother, Kaien Shiba. However, in the end, Byakuya arrives, and Ganju decides to fight him despite the vast difference in their powers.
41	21	"Reunion, Ichigo and Rukia"; Transliteration: "Saikai, Ichigo to Rukia" (Japanese: 再会、一護とルキア)	Kōji Aritomi	Natsuko Takahashi	Kōji Aritomi	July 19, 2005	July 15, 2007
As Ichigo awakens, Yoruichi reveals that she is actually a woman. Afterwards, Yoruichi shows Ichigo a device that allowed her to fly, and Ichigo uses it to go save Ganju and Hanatarō. Meanwhile, Byakuya easily defeats Ganju with his shikai, but is then stopped by the thirteenth division captain, Jūshirō Ukitake. Ichigo arrives and fights Byakuya. Before Byakuya can activate his shikai, Yoruichi stops him.
