= Bleach (TV series) =

Japanese anime television series

- Genre: Adventure; Martial arts; Supernatural
- Based on: Bleach (Note: Specifically, chapters 1–479)
- Created by: Tite Kubo
- Directed by: Noriyuki Abe
- Series composition: Masashi Sogo; (#1–229, #266–316); Tsuyoshi Kida (#230–265); Kento Shimoyama (#317–366)
- Character designer: Masashi Kudo
- Music by: Shirō Sagisu
- Voices of: Masakazu Morita; Fumiko Orikasa; Yuki Matsuoka; Noriaki Sugiyama; Hiroki Yasumoto; Mitsuaki Madono
- No. of seasons: 16 (Note: According to the Japanese home media release of the series by Aniplex)
- No. of episodes: 366 (list of episodes)

Production
- Cinematographers: Toshiyuki Fukushima (#1–291); Katsufumi Sato (#292–366)
- Editor: Junichi Uematsu
- Producers: Ken Hagino; Noriko Kobayashi (#1–86, #226–328); Yutaka Sugiyama (#1–25, #355–366); Yukio Yoshimura (#26–133); Shunji Aoki (#87–225); Aya Mizobuchi (#134–157); Mai Nagai (#158–354); Hatsuo Nara (#343–366)
- Production companies: TV Tokyo; Dentsu; Studio Pierrot
- Runtime: 23 minutes (#1–51); 24 minutes (#52–366)

Original release
- Network: TV Tokyo
- Release: October 5, 2004 – March 27, 2012

Related
- Bleach: Thousand-Year Blood War (2022–2026)

Bleach (stylized in all caps) is a Japanese anime television series based on the manga series Bleach by Tite Kubo. It was produced by Studio Pierrot and directed by Noriyuki Abe. The series aired on TV Tokyo and its TXN affiliates from October 2004 to March 2012, spanning 366 episodes. The story follows the adventures of the teenage Ichigo Kurosaki after he obtains the powers of a Soul Reaper—a death personification similar to the Grim Reaper—from a Soul Reaper named Rukia Kuchiki. His newfound powers allow him to take on the duties of defending humans from evil spirits called "Hollows" and guiding departed souls to the afterlife. In addition to adapting the manga series on which it is based, the anime features original, self-contained storylines and characters that are not found in the source material.

Viz Media obtained foreign television and home video distribution rights to the Bleach anime in March 2006. Bleach was broadcast in the United States on Adult Swim from September 2006 to November 2014.

Bleach: Thousand-Year Blood War, a follow-up series covering the manga's final story arc, (Note: Specifically, chapters 480–686) also animated by Studio Pierrot (Studio Pierrot for its first two parts and Pierrot Films for its last two parts) and directed by Tomohisa Taguchi (Note: Director (監督) for Parts 1–2 and Chief Director (総監督) for Parts 3–4) and Hikaru Murata, (Note: Chief Episode Director (チーフ演出) for Parts 1–2 and Director (監督) for Parts 3–4) aired for four cours on TV Tokyo and its TXN affiliates from October 2022 to October 2026, totaling 50 episodes.

== Plot ==
The series adapts Kubo's manga with the main story arcs and introduces anime-exclusive ones. In Karakura Town, high school student Ichigo Kurosaki becomes a substitute Soul Reaper (死神, Shinigami; lit. 'Death God'), when Rukia Kuchiki puts her life at risk to protect him from a Hollow who attacks Ichigo's younger twin sisters. Although initially reluctant to accept his responsibility, he takes her place, and during this time they discover that a few classmates are spiritually aware and have their own powers: Quincy survivor Uryū Ishida uses spiritual particles, Orihime Inoue has a group of protective spirits called Shun Shun Rikka and Yasutora Sado ("Chad") has strength equal to the Hollows encased in his arm.

When Rukia is sentenced to death for transgressions in the human world and sent to the Soul Society, Ichigo meets Kisuke Urahara and Yoruichi Shihōin, the duo of exiled Soul Reapers. They allow him and his friends to save Rukia. After this, it is revealed that ex-squad captain Sousuke Aizen framed Rukia for the crime and has been illegally experimenting on Soul Reapers and Hollows. Aizen plans to conquer the Soul Society by using the Hōgyoku, a legendary powerful substance turning Hollows into half Soul Reapers. After faking his death and his reappearance caused a fight with some people, Aizen escapes into Hueco Mundo, the realm of Hollow, and later kidnaps Orihime as she is instrumental in creating the Oken, a power that will allow him to kill the Soul King, the ruler of the Soul Society.

After being trained by the Vizards, other Hollowfied Soul Reapers and the victims of Aizen's experiment, Ichigo and his friends travel into Hueco Mundo. Facing a group of Arrancar, who are Hollows given Soul Reaper abilities, led by an elite group known as the Espada, which are composed of ten Arrancars with exemplary strength. Espadas serve as commanders in Aizen's army and each has the factions of weaker Arrancars. Along with Aizen, Gin Ichimaru and Kaname Tōsen, the Espada as a group possess comparable strength to Soul Reaper captains. After Ichigo rescuing Orihime, Aizen reveals her kidnapping was a distraction to allow him to take Karakura Town, as its spiritual energy is what is needed for the Oken. After being trained by his father Isshin, another exiled Soul Reaper, Ichigo sacrifices his Soul Reaper power to seal Aizen away when the Hōgyoku rejects its master, and the Soul Reapers defeat the Espadas.

Months later, Chad and the members reveal themselves as Fullbringers in a group called Xcution. They can give up their powers to restore other ones and they plan on doing so for Ichigo, who uses the power of Fullbringer. However, it is all a ruse by their leader Kugo Ginjo, a Fullbringer and former Substitute Soul Reaper, to extract his powers and empower all of them. Ichigo has his Soul Reaper powers restored, when he gains his trust from the Soul Society. After helping other Soul Reapers defeat Ginjo's team, Ichigo resumes his duty as an official Substitute Soul Reaper.

Several anime exclusive story arcs are introduced during the series. The first arc focuses on the Bount, a group of spiritual humans who are immortal longer by stealing souls. Their leader, Jin Kariya, seeks to destroy the Soul Society in revenge. However, Ichigo and his allies defeat them. The second arc focuses on Shūsuke Amagai, a Soul Reaper captain replacing Ichimaru. Amagai seeks revenge against Captain Yamamoto for the death of his father and uses the clan's forbidden experiment. However, Amagai realizes his mistake and kills himself. The third arc features the evil Zanpakutō spirit Muramasa, who turns itself and other ones into spiritual beings to take revenge on the Soul Society for imprisoning its master Kōga Kuchiki. After succeeding, he is double-crossed and transforms into a monstrous creature that Ichigo defeats, but after Muramasa reveals the intention was to have Soul Reapers and Zanpakutō communicate on equal terms. The fourth and final arc features an event in which Kagerōza Inaba creates modified copies of all Soul Reapers in Reigai bodies. He attempts to fuse with Nozomi Kujō into an original being Ōko Yushima. However, Nozomi sacrifices herself to defeat Inaba and Ichigo loses his power.

== Voice cast and characters ==
| Character | Japanese | English |
|---|---|---|
| Ichigo Kurosaki | Masakazu Morita | Johnny Yong Bosch |
| Rukia Kuchiki | Fumiko Orikasa | Michelle Ruff |
| Orihime Inoue | Yuki Matsuoka | Stephanie Sheh |
| Uryū Ishida | Noriaki Sugiyama | Derek Stephen Prince |
| Yasutora "Chad" Sado | Hiroki Yasumoto | Marc Worden (until ep. 85); Jamieson Price |
| Kon | Mitsuaki Madono | Quinton Flynn |
| Kisuke Urahara | Shin-ichiro Miki | Michael Lindsay (until ep. 214); Doug Erholtz |
| Yoruichi Shihōin | Satsuki Yukino; Shirō Saitō (cat form) | Wendee Lee; Terrence Stone (cat form) |
| Renji Abarai | Kentarō Itō; Reiko Kiuchi (young) | Wally Wingert; Yuri Lowenthal (young) |
| Byakuya Kuchiki | Ryōtarō Okiayu | Daniel Woren; Yuri Lowenthal (young) |
| Shunsui Kyōraku | Akio Otsuka | Steve Kramer |
| Tōshirō Hitsugaya | Romi Park | Steve Staley |
| Rangiku Matsumoto | Kaya Matsutani | Megan Hollingshead |
| Shūhei Hisagi | Katsuyuki Konishi | Steve Staley |
| Kenpachi Zaraki | Fumihiko Tachiki | David Lodge |
| Yachiru Kusajishi | Hisayo Mochizuki | Dina Sherman |
| Ikkaku Madarame | Nobuyuki Hiyama | Vic Mignogna; Michael Sinterniklass (stand-in) |
| Yumichika Ayasegawa | Jun Fukuyama | Brian Beacock |
| Jūshirō Ukitake | Hideo Ishikawa | Liam O'Brien; Kim Strauss (stand-in) |
| Sajin Komamura | Tetsu Inada | Kim Strauss (first voice); JB Blanc |
| Gin Ichimaru | Kōji Yusa | Doug Erholtz |
| Mayuri Kurotsuchi | Ryūsei Nakao | Terrence Stone |
| Genryūsai Shigekuni Yamamoto | Masaaki Tsukada | Neil Kaplan |
| Ulquiorra Cifer | Daisuke Namikawa | Tony Oliver |
| Isshin Kurosaki | Toshiyuki Morikawa | Patrick Seitz |
| Karin Kurosaki | Rie Kugimiya | Kate Higgins |
| Yuzu Kurosaki | Ayumi Sena | Janice Kawaye |
| Kūgo Ginjō | Hiroki Tōchi | Travis Willingham |
| Sousuke Aizen | Show Hayami | Kyle Hebert |

== Casting ==
=== Japanese ===
Ichigo's voice actor, Masakazu Morita, tried to re-create the mood that he felt when he read the manga and imagined hearing the dialogue. In an interview with Elicia O'Reilly of the Japan Foundation, Morita said that to get into character, he would say a line that epitomizes that character.

=== English ===
Studio City, Los Angeles-based Studiopolis was hired to dub the anime. The English-language cast was assembled from experienced industry actors that have dozens of roles in other anime series, films and video games. Originally, Johnny Yong Bosch, Ichigo's English voice actor, found pronouncing the names of the characters to be difficult and tried to emulate the deep gruff voice of Ichigo. Bosch acknowledges that the directorial control was loosened as the work progressed; stating around episode 10, as he was guided into the role of Ichigo and the growth of the character. Bosch noted that the long scenes of screaming and panting—in particular, the scene in episode 18—have nearly made him pass out. Stephanie Sheh noticed the difference in the tone of her Orihime voice in the English adaptation and described it as being higher-pitched and "innocent-sounding". The English dub producers wanted to make Orihime sound tough and comedic, but not "ditzy". She relates to her character's unusual creations for food. Derek Stephen Prince likes to play Uryu because he is the black sheep of the cast and he is a complex character. Throughout the production, Prince acknowledges his role as the English voice actor of Shino Aburame from Naruto and sets them apart by taking a Clint Eastwood tone for Uryu.

For the voicework, one of the challenges was stating Japanese phrases while maintaining pronunciation and inflection. The duality of the story was hard to keep up with, and the cast had to juggle the challenges of performing under the different lifestyles of the characters. The voice actors often made suggestions for the scenes that differ from the approved script and results in rewriting and additional takes that were put into the dub.

== Production ==
Noriyuki Abe was chosen as director of the series while Masashi Sogo acted as head writer for episodes 1–212. Tsuyoshi Kida was the head writer for episodes 230–265. Kento Shimoyama held the title of head writer for episodes 17–366. Masashi Kudō provided the character designs, occasionally providing key animation or acting as an animation supervisor himself.

The music of Bleach was composed by Shirō Sagisu. His musical score for the television series was released in four-CD sets. Four additional CDs were released for the music composed for the four Bleach animated films.

During the production and broadcast of the first 167 episodes, the screen size was in 4:3; episodes 168 through 366 were produced and broadcast in 16:9 widescreen.

In a 2009 interview, Kubo and Kudō discussed the original story for the anime adaptation, Zanpakutō: The Alternate Tale, with Kubo expressing that he desired to borrow events and concepts within it for the manga. Kubo also revealed that his art style varied in the production of the work and only became cemented after the airing of the anime. He acknowledged that his art style has changed as a result of his work and gave an example that he no longer draws hair growing from behind the ears of characters.

On October 5, 2024, Aniplex released an animated video to celebrate the anime series' 20th anniversary. The video features climactic scenes from the series, animated in the new Bleach: Thousand-Year Blood War anime style.

== Music ==
The soundtrack of Bleach, composed by Shirō Sagisu, was released in four volumes and an anniversary box set. A series of character song albums, the "Bleach Beat Collection" albums, and best-of albums composed of the theme songs were released, all by Sony Music Entertainment Japan.

Five volumes of Bleach Soundtracks have been released. Bleach Original Soundtrack 1 has twenty five songs, released on May 18, 2005. Bleach Original Soundtrack 2 has twenty three songs covering up to episode 64 of the Bount Arc and was released on August 8, 2006. Bleach Original Soundtrack 3 has twenty seven songs and was released on November 5, 2008. Bleach Original Soundtrack 4 was the fourth and final album that has thirty songs, and was released on December 16, 2009. The fifth anniversary box set was released on July 29, 2009, with a CD including 21 previously unreleased songs.

The Bleach Beat Collections is a set of CDs published by Sony Music featuring recordings by the original Japanese voice actors that provide a look at the personalities of the characters they play, as well as the voice actors themselves. The first CD was released on June 22, 2005, twenty-one volumes followed across four named sets called Sessions.

A number of additional collections have been released. Two volumes were released as "The Best", with each volume containing twenty four songs each on two discs; the first volume released March 21, 2007, and the second one on March 18, 2009. The Bleach Breathless Collection contains six releases featuring five tracks of the individual Soul Reaper. The volumes were released from September 30, 2009, to March 3, 2010. The six volumes feature Ichigo, Rukia, Renji, Toshiro, Shuhei and Byakuya, respectively. A CD series titled Radio DJCD Bleach 'B' Station, consisting of five seasons—the first two with six CDs each and the rest with five—was released from December 5, 2005, to June 22, 2011.

== Release ==
Bleach premiered in Japan on TV Tokyo on October 5, 2004. The series was directed by Noriyuki Abe, and produced by TV Tokyo, Dentsu and Studio Pierrot. It ran for 366 episodes, finishing on March 27, 2012. 88 DVD compilations were released by Aniplex in Japan from February 2, 2005, to January 23, 2013. (Note: The Substitute; 5 volumes; The Entry; 5 volumes; Soul Society: The Rescue; 5 volumes; The Bount; 7 volumes; The Assault; 4 volumes; The Arrancar; 5 volumes; The Arrancar Part 2: The Hueco Mundo Sneak Entry; 5 volumes; The Arrancar Part 3: The Fierce Fight; 4 volumes; The New Captain Shūsuke Amagai; 5 volumes; The Arrancar Part 4: Arrancar vs Soul Reaper; 4 volumes; The Past; 2 volumes; The Arrancar Part 5: Battle in Karakura; 4 volumes; Zanpakutō: The Alternate Tale; 9 volumes; The Arrancar Part 6: Fall of the Arrancar; 12 volumes; Gotei 13 Invading Army; 6 volumes; The Lost Agent; 6 volumes)

Viz Media obtained the foreign television, home video and merchandising rights to the Bleach anime from TV Tokyo Corporation, and Shueisha on March 15, 2006. Viz Media had later licensed its individual Bleach merchandising rights to several different companies. In North America, the series first premiered on Canada's YTV channel in the Bionix programming block on September 9, 2006. Cartoon Network's Adult Swim began airing Bleach in the United States on September 10, 2006. Adult Swim stopped broadcasting episodes of the English adaptation on October 13, 2007, after airing the first 52 episodes of the series. It was replaced with another Viz Media series, Death Note, to provide Studiopolis more time to dub additional episodes of Bleach. The series resumed airing on March 2, 2008, but went back on hiatus on November 21, 2009, after the 167th episode. The series returned to the block with new episodes on August 28, 2010, replacing Fullmetal Alchemist: Brotherhood. The anime joined the relaunched Toonami anime block, when it returned to Adult Swim on May 27, 2012. The series ended on November 2, 2014, and continued airing reruns on Adult Swim until February 1, 2015.

Viz Media had released the first 135 episodes on 32 DVD compilations of the English adaptation of the anime from November 28, 2006, to September 21, 2010, and released the entire series on 26 box sets from October 6, 2008, to September 29, 2015. In July 2016, Viz Media announced the uncut Blu-ray box-set release of the series. The 366 episodes were collected in thirteen sets, released from July 19, 2016, to December 7, 2021.

In the United Kingdom, Bleach premiered on AnimeCentral on September 13, 2007, with episodes airing weekly. Anime Limited started releasing the series on Blu-ray in the United Kingdom on November 4, 2024. The English dubbed version of Bleach premiered on Animax Asia on December 18, 2009, with the first 52 episodes; the "season 2" premiered on March 18, 2011, this time with the original Japanese audio with English subtitles.

== Other media ==
All four films based on the manga series were directed by Noriyuki Abe. They feature an original plotline along with original characters designed by Tite Kubo, which is contrary to the normal practice for anime-based films, as the original author usually has little creative involvement. The first film, Bleach: Memories of Nobody, was released in Japan on December 16, 2006, and had a limited release in North America in June 2008. The second film, Bleach: The DiamondDust Rebellion, was released on December 22, 2007. The third film, Bleach: Fade to Black, was released on December 13, 2008. The fourth and final film, Bleach: Hell Verse, was released on December 4, 2010.

In March 2010, Warner Bros. Pictures confirmed that it was in talks to create a live action film adaptation of the series. Peter Segal and Michael Ewing had been lined up to produce the film. In 2012, Dan Mazeau was added as a screenwriter for the project, and Masi Oka joined as producer.

A live action film adaptation of the same name produced by Warner Bros. directed by Shinsuke Sato and starring Sota Fukushi was released in Japan on July 20, 2018.

Aniplex released thirteen drama CDs featuring the original voice actors from the series; these drama CDs have only been included as part of the DVD releases.

The popularity of the anime series resulted in the series of rock musicals, jointly produced by Pierrot and Nelke Planning. There have been five musicals produced which covered portions of the Substitute and Soul Society arcs, as well as three additional performances known as "Live Bankai Shows" which did not follow the Bleach plotline. The initial performance run of the Bleach musical was from August 17–28, 2005 at the Space Zero Tokyo center in Shinjuku. The musicals are directed by Takuya Hiramitsu, with a script adaptation by Naoshi Okumura and music composed by playwright Shoichi Tama. The songs are completely original and not taken from the anime soundtrack. Key actors in the series include Tatsuya Isaka as Ichigo Kurosaki, Miki Satō as Rukia Kuchiki and Eiji Moriyama as Renji Abarai.

== Reception ==
=== Sales and ratings ===
The Bleach anime has been featured various times in the top ten from the Japanese TV Ranking. DVDs have also had good sales having commonly appeared in the Japanese DVD Ranking. In a 2005 Internet poll by TV Asahi, the anime was ranked as Japan's 27th favorite anime program. In the following year, it was ranked as the seventh favorite program. In February 2009, it ranked as the ninth most viewed animated show from Hulu.

=== Critical response ===
Anime News Network's Carlo Santos praised the anime adaptation, describing it as "...one incredibly entertaining anime that will grab you and refuse to let go." Animefringe's Maria Lin liked the varied and distinct characters, and how well they handle the responsibilities increasing powers give them. She also complimented the series for its attention to details, well paced script, and balance of seriousness and comedy. In summary, she notes "Bleach the anime deserves its popularity. It has something for everyone: the supernatural, comedy, action and a little bit of romance, all tied together with excellent animation and a very enthusiastic sounding bunch of voice actors." Adam Arseneau of DVD Verdict, felt Bleach was a "show that only gets better with age" and was "surprisingly well-rounded and appealing" with well-developed characters and pacing.

Active Anime's Holly Ellingwood praising the anime for perfectly capturing "the excitement, the caustic humour and supernatural intrigue" of the original manga. She felt that the series "does a wonderful job of building on its continuity to provide increasingly tense and layered episodes involving not only Ichigo and Rukia, but the secondary characters as well". She also praised the series for its striking visual effects, intriguing plot and its "brilliant blend of action, off the wall comedy." In reviewing the series for DVD Talk, Don Houston felt the characters surpassed the usual anime typicals and liked "the mixture of darker material with the comedic". Another fellow reviewer John Sinnott felt series starts out as a boring "monster-of-the-week program" that becomes more epic as the stories build and the characters are fleshed out.

Otaku USA's Joseph Luster wrote that "the storylines are consistently dramatic without hammering it home too heavily, the characters manage comic relief that's not as eye rolling as one would expect, and the action (in classic fighting series form) has only gotten more ridiculous over the years; in a good way, of course". Mania.com's Chris Beveridge describes the series as "Bleach is a solid entry into the Shōnen Jump line up, this is a very easy recommendation to make if you're looking for something in this genre". Bryce Coulter from the same website praised the series for its plot twists and "the quirky and amusing characters".

Von Feigenblatt notes that "in terms of demographics, Bleach appeals to a narrower international audience than Naruto due to the higher complexity of its plot as well as due to the religious aspects of the story." Louis Kemner of CBR said that the anime has "one of the most interesting and flexible combat systems" in anime and says this makes for some "stunning action scenes." Kemner also said that the series had "a wide and colorful cast of characters."

=== Accolades ===
The Bleach anime was nominated in the 2007 America Anime Awards in the fields of "best manga", "best actor", "best DVD package design", and "best theme", but failed to win any awards.

== Sequel ==
Bleach: Thousand-Year Blood War (BLEACH 千年血戦篇, Burīchi Sennen Kessen-hen), an anime television series adaptation of the manga's "Thousand-Year Blood War" story arc, premiered on TV Tokyo on October 11, 2022. (Note: TV Tokyo listed the air dates for the series on Monday at 24:00, effectively Tuesday at 0:00 a.m. JST.) Tomohisa Taguchi replaced Noriyuki Abe as the series director at Pierrot. Taguchi oversaw the series scripts alongside Masaki Hiramatsu; Masashi Kudo returned as the character designer, and Shirō Sagisu returned to compose the music. The series ran for four cours with breaks in between. The first 13-episodes cours, subtitled The Blood Warfare, finished on December 27, 2022. (Note: The first cours' finale was a one-hour special that aired the 12th and 13th episodes back-to-back.) The second 13-episode cours, The Separation, was broadcast from July 8 to September 30, 2023. (Note: The second cours' finale was a one-hour special airing the 25th and 26th episodes back-to-back.) The third 14-episode cours, The Conflict, produced by Pierrot's second studio, Pierrot Films, and directed by Hikaru Murata, was broadcast from October 5 to December 28, 2024. (Note: The third cours' finale was a one-hour special airing the 39th and 40th episodes back-to-back.) The fourth and final 10-episode cours, The Calamity, aired from July 25 to October 27, 2026.
