= Bleach: Heat the Soul =

Video game series

Cover for Bleach: Heat the Soul

Bleach: Heat the Soul is a series of fighting games developed by Eighting and published by Sony Computer Entertainment for the PlayStation Portable. They are based on the manga and anime series Bleach by Tite Kubo. All installments have been released only in Japan.

Each installment has several methods of play, with different types of game modes. New games have introduced additional modes that usually carry over to the sequels. Using characters taken directly from the Bleach manga, the player uses each character's unique abilities to battle and defeat an opponent. New games expand on the series' plotline in "Story Mode" or, as it is known in Heat the Soul 3 and 4, "Mission Mode", which generally stays true to the source material. Because of this, the character roster increases with each installment.

== Gameplay ==
An example of gameplay from Bleach: Heat the Soul 3.

In each game of the series, the player controls one of many characters directly based upon their Bleach manga counterparts. The player then pits their character against another, usually controlled by the game but this can also be another player depending on the mode being used. The objective of each match is to reduce the opponent's health to zero using basic attacks and special techniques unique to each character and derived from techniques they use in the source material. For instance, Ichigo Kurosaki's use of his Black Getsuga Tensho (though only while using Ichigo's bankai form) and Rukia Kuchiki's utilization of kidō. For some techniques, characters have available a "spirit gauge", which depletes upon execution. Most techniques are not executed in real time, and instead have an accompanying cinematic that takes place. Furthermore, some characters can transform into certain alternative forms mid-battle, albeit until their spirit gauge is fully drained or the player cancels the transformation. As of Heat the Soul 3, the player may select partner characters to help aid them in battle. Each partner character has different abilities based on their skills from the series. Whereas Heat the Soul 3 allows the selection of up to three partner characters, Heat the Soul 4 only allows two at a time, though the abilities of both can be combined to create more powerful effects.

Each installment introduces new ways of playing through Story Mode. Heat the Soul features a classic story mode, allowing the player to simply relive all the important battles from the beginning of the series. Heat the Soul 2 adds a bit of variety to the original story mode, allowing players to play through each character's individual story. For example, if Ichigo Kurosaki is selected, the player must fight all his battles with the shinigami; if Byakuya Kuchiki is selected, the player must stop Ichigo and his friends from saving Rukia Kuchiki. Heat the Soul 3 no longer uses "Story Mode" but rather "Mission Battle". In Mission Battle mode, the player must relive the battles of the series, though must meet certain conditions, such as a time limit, before being able to move on. Heat the Soul 4 also uses Mission Battle. Depending on completion time and remaining stamina, the player is awarded a rank of "S" through "C", S being the highest ranking possible. If awarded S or A, a scenario branching occurs.

== Installments ==
=== Bleach: Heat the Soul ===
Bleach: Heat the Soul (ＢＬＥＡＣＨ：ヒート・ザ・ソウル) is the first installment in the Heat the Soul fighting game series, released on March 24, 2005. The theme song for the game is *: Asterisk by Orange Range, the original opening theme for the anime. The game has a total of six characters, all of which derived from the Agent of the Shinigami arc. One thing critics seemed to like were the authentic voice-overs during both gameplay and conversation sequences. The voice actors themselves also appeared at the Jump Festa event for a live talk show appearance on a mock radio station just months before the game's release.

=== Bleach: Heat the Soul 2 ===
Bleach: Heat the Soul 2 (ＢＬＥＡＣＨ：ヒート・ザ・ソウル２) is the second installment in the Heat the Soul series, released on September 1, 2005. The theme song for this game is Chance! by Uverworld, and the music was composed by Kazuo Hanzawa, under the alias "NON", and Hitoshi Sakimoto. Continuing where Heat the Soul left off, the story mode of Heat the Soul 2 ranges from the Soul Society: The Sneak Entry arc to the end of the Soul Society: The Rescue arc and features 12 playable characters. As opposed to Heat the Soul's story mode, this game allows to follow the story of the selected character rather than a single, designated plot. For example, if the players choose Ichigo Kurosaki, they would fight all his battles with the shinigami, whereas if they chose to play as Byakuya Kuchiki, the players must stop Ichigo and his friends from saving Rukia Kuchiki.

=== Bleach: Heat the Soul 3 ===
Bleach: Heat the Soul 3 (ＢＬＥＡＣＨ：ヒート・ザ・ソウル３) is the third installment in the Heat the Soul series, released on July 20, 2006. The game features 34 characters, covering events from the Soul Society: The Sneak Entry arc to Ulquiorra Schiffer's introduction at the beginning of The Arrancar arc. Unique to Heat the Soul 3 are "Soul Road" and "Karakura Heroes". In Soul Road, the player is to select the desired character and partner character. Afterwards, the player is set on a board game-like map where the goal is to pass through markers in order to fight enemies. After each match, the player is given an amount of "Trust points" (how many received depends on the mode's difficulty) which go towards leveling up partner characters and unlocking bonuses, such as alternate costumes and new partners. To unlock these bonuses, the player must find a blue marker to turn in their points; however, before doing so, the players must answer a multiple choice question. In Karakura Heroes, the player is put into a humorous side-story, with some extra anime scenes added. Don Kanonji leads a group of shinigami, initially Byakuya Kuchiki and Tōshirō Hitsugaya, on some sort of wacky adventure which involves battling several other characters. At the mode's completion, a scene shows the gang relaxing at an expensive hotel, doing activities that in some way fit their personalities and/or abilities (for example, Hitsugaya snowboarding).

=== Bleach: Heat the Soul 4 ===
Example gameplay from Heat the Soul 4.

Bleach: Heat the Soul 4 (ＢＬＥＡＣＨ：ヒート・ザ・ソウル４) is the fourth installment in the Heat the Soul series, released on May 24, 2007. The game features 51 characters, covering events from The Arrancar arc to the entrance into Hueco Mundo.

Unlike its predecessors, Heat the Soul 4 features a "Character Master" mode. In it, the player chooses a character and goes through a series of five battles and is usually faced with certain conditions, such as using only grab to inflict damage, in order to finish the battle. After the third and final battles, a multiple answer question posed by the character must be answered. Depending on the answer, the player is either rewarded 200 points, 50 points, or nothing. For each battle won, a random number of experience points will be added to the character's total. As the level grows higher, bonuses such as voice tests and alternate costumes can be unlocked. The player is also given 100 points per battle; these go towards unlocking more characters and stages.

=== Bleach: Heat the Soul 5 ===
Bleach: Heat the Soul 5 (ＢＬＥＡＣＨ：ヒート・ザ・ソウル５) is the fifth installment in the Heat the Soul series based on Tite Kubo's Bleach, released on May, 15th 2008 in Japan. Like previous installments it picks off where the other Heat The Soul left off, from the entry of Hueco Mundo to the encounter between Grimmjow and Ichigo. New features include a "Tag Action" system and a new way for releasing zanpakutō. Transformations such as Bankai are now made when 2 bars of reiatsu is obtained and then pressing the L button, rather than selecting a character's Bankai form before a fight. There also seems to be 3 styles of tag action: offensive, defensive and technical. There is also a game mode called Tag Master, which lets the player choose 2 characters to fight with in a series of fights. The system also includes specials which use the tagged partner's abilities.

The game features 32 characters usable in Tag Battle mode, while extra characters can be obtained with Bleach: Heat The Soul 4 game save through game conversion. However, these characters are only usable in single mode with no in-game transformation. They are selected through a separate menu accessible by pressing L/R in the normal character menu.

=== Bleach: Heat the Soul 6 ===
Bleach: Heat the Soul 6 (ＢＬＥＡＣＨ：ヒート・ザ・ソウル6) is the sixth game in the Heat the Soul series based on Tite Kubo's Bleach, which was released in Japan on May 14, 2009. It includes more Arrancar Resurrections like that of Nnoitora, Szayelapporo Grantz or Nel(Gamuza). The game has a new championship mode added in which you can fight tournament style similar to Bleach Soul Carnival and a customization mode exclusive to Heat the Soul 6. The game's story mode starts from the day Ichigo got his powers to the Espada/Soul Reaper showdowns to date in the anime. It boasts a character roster consisting of 74 playable characters including Senna, Sojiro Kusaka, Dark Rukia, and the Visored and Tessai in their Soul Reaper uniforms from the "Turn Back the Pendulum" arc. Its opening theme is "Koyoi, Tsuki ga Miezu Tomo" by Porno Graffitti which was also used for Bleach: Fade to Black.

=== Bleach: Heat the Soul 7 ===
Bleach: Heat the Soul 7 (ＢＬＥＡＣＨ：ヒート・ザ・ソウル7) was released on September 2, 2010. The main change in this game is a 4-Players mode. The game features battles against giant characters. New characters include Allon (Ayon), Coyote Starrk (Los Lobos), Baraggan Luisenbarn (Arrogante), Tier Harribel (Tiburon), Yammy Liargo (Ira), Ulquiorra Cifer (Segunda Etapa), Ichigo Kurosaki (Full Hollow), Muramasa, Hachigen Ushoda, Love Aikawa and Shuren (downloadable content); in all, 84 characters are playable.

== Playable characters ==
The characters in the Heat the Soul series are directly based upon characters taken from Bleach. With Heat the Soul 4 set between Shinji Hirako's introduction and the entrance into Hueco Mundo, "normal" characters originate from The Arrancar arc and later, while "EX" forms, as they're known in the game, are from the Soul Society: The Rescue arc.

To avoid confusion, all characters will be referred to as they are in the most recent installment in the series, Heat the Soul 7. It also appears that most (if not all) characters can change forms during battle. For example, Hollow Ichigo and Ichigo can start out a match with shikai and end it with bankai when they have enough spiritual pressure.

Fighter	1	2	3	4	5	6	7
Aaroniero Arruruerie (Kaien Shiba)	✗	✗	✗	✗	✓	✓	✓
Ayon (Allon)	✗	✗	✗	✗	✗	✗	✓
Barragan Luisenbarn	✗	✗	✗	✗	✗	✗	✓
Byakuya Kuchiki (Shikai)	✗	✓	✓	✓	✓	✓	✓
Byakuya Kuchiki (Bankai)	✗	✗	✓	✓	✓	✓	✓
Cirucci Sanderwicci	✗	✗	✗	✗	✓	✓	✓
Coyote Stark	✗	✗	✗	✗	✗	✗	✓
Dordoni Alessandro Del Socaccio	✗	✗	✗	✗	✓	✓	✓
Gantenbainne Mosqueda	✗	✗	✗	✗	✓	✓	✓
Gin Ichimaru (Shikai)	✗	✗	✗	✓	✓	✓	✓
Gin Ichimaru EX (Shikai)	✗	✓	✓	✓	✓	✗	✓
Grimmjow Jaegerjaques	✗	✗	✗	✓	✓	✓	✓
Grimmjow Jaegerjaques (Pantera)	✗	✗	✗	✗	✓	✓	✓
Hachigen Ushōda	✗	✗	✗	✗	✗	✗	✓
Hiyori Sarugaki	✗	✗	✗	✓	✓	✓	✓
Hiyori Sarugaki (with Visored's mask)	✗	✗	✗	✗	✓	✓	✓
Ichigo Kurosaki (Bankai)	✗	✗	✓	✓	✓	✓	✓
Hollow Ichigo (Shikai)	✗	✗	✗	✗	✓	✓	✓
Hollow Ichigo (Bankai)	✗	✗	✓	✓	✓	✓	✓
Ichigo Kurosaki (Substitute Shinigami)	✓	✓	✓	✓	✗	✓	✓
Ichigo Kurosaki (Shikai)	✗	✓	✓	✓	✓	✓	✓
Ichigo Kurosaki (Full Hollow)	✗	✗	✗	✗	✗	✗	✓
Ikkaku Madarame (Shikai)	✗	✗	✗	✓	✓	✓	✓
Ikkaku Madarame (Bankai)	✗	✗	✗	✓	✓	✓	✓
Izuru Kira	✗	✗	✓	✓	✓	✓	✓
Jūshirō Ukitake	✗	✗	✓	✓	✓	✓	✓
Kaname Tōsen	✗	✗	✗	✓	✓	✓	✓
Kenpachi Zaraki	✗	✗	✓	✓	✓	✓	✓
Kisuke Urahara	✗	✓	✓	✓	✓	✓	✓
Kisuke Urahara (12th Division Captain)	✗	✗	✗	✗	✗	✓	✓
Kensei Muguruma (Shikai)	✗	✗	✗	✓	✓	✓	✓
Lisa Yadōmaru	✗	✗	✗	✓	✓	✓	✓
Love Aikawa	✗	✗	✗	✗	✗	✗	✓
Luppi	✗	✗	✗	✓	✓	✓	✓
Mashiro Kuna	✗	✗	✗	✗	✗	✓	✓
Mayuri Kurotsuchi	✗	✗	✓	✓	✓	✓	✓
Momo Hinamori	✗	✗	✓	✓	✓	✓	✓
Muramasa	✗	✗	✗	✗	✗	✗	✓
Nanao Ise	✗	✗	✓	✓	✓	✓	✓
Nel Tu	✗	✗	✗	✓	✓	✓	✓
Nelliel Tu Odelschwanck	✗	✗	✗	✗	✓	✓	✓
Nelliel Tu Odelschwanck (Gamuza)	✗	✗	✗	✗	✗	✓	✓
Nemu Kurotsuchi	✗	✗	✓	✓	✓	✓	✓
Nnoitora Jiruga	✗	✗	✗	✗	✓	✓	✓
Nnoitora Jiruga (Santa Teresa)	✗	✗	✗	✗	✗	✓	✓
Orihime Inoue	✗	✗	✗	✓	✓	✓	✓
Orihime Inoue EX	✓	✓	✓	✓	✓	✗	✓
Rangiku Matsumoto	✗	✗	✓	✓	✓	✓	✓
Renji Abarai (Bankai)	✗	✗	✓	✓	✓	✓	✓
Renji Abarai (Shikai)	✓	✓	✓	✓	✓	✓	✓
Rose Otoribashi	✗	✗	✗	✗	✗	✓	✓
Rukia Kuchiki (Gigai)	✓	✓	✓	✓	✓	✓	✓
Rukia Kuchiki (Shikai)	✗	✗	✓	✓	✓	✓	✓
Rukia Kuchiki (Dark)	✗	✗	✗	✗	✗	✓	✓
Ryūken Ishida	✗	✗	✗	✗	✗	✓	✓
Sajin Komamura	✗	✗	✓	✓	✓	✓	✓
Senna	✗	✗	✗	✗	✓	✓	✓
Shigekuni Yamamoto-Genryūsai	✗	✗	✓	✓	✓	✓	✓
Shinji Hirako	✗	✗	✗	✓	✓	✓	✓
Shinji Hirako (with Visored's mask)	✗	✗	✗	✗	✓	✓	✓
Shunsui Kyōraku	✗	✗	✓	✓	✓	✓	✓
Shūhei Hisagi	✗	✗	✓	✓	✓	✓	✓
Suì-Fēng (Shikai)	✗	✗	✓	✓	✓	✓	✓
Sōjirō Kusaka	✗	✗	✗	✗	✓	✓	✓
Sousuke Aizen	✗	✗	✗	✓	✓	✓	✓
Sousuke Aizen EX	✗	✗	✓	✓	✓	✗	✓
Szayelaporro Grantz	✗	✗	✗	✗	✓	✓	✓
Szayelaporro Grantz (Fornicaras)	✗	✗	✗	✗	✗	✓	✓
Tia Harribel	✗	✗	✗	✗	✗	✓	✓
Tia Harribel (Tiburón )	✗	✗	✗	✗	✗	✗	✓
Tessai Tsukabishi	✗	✗	✗	✗	✗	✓	✓
Tōshirō Hitsugaya (Bankai)	✗	✗	✓	✓	✓	✓	✓
Tōshirō Hitsugaya (Shikai)	✗	✓	✓	✓	✓	✓	✓
Ulquiorra Cifer	✗	✗	✓	✓	✓	✓	✓
Ulquiorra Cifer (Resurrección: Segunda Etapa)	✗	✗	✗	✗	✗	✗	✓
Uryū Ishida	✗	✗	✗	✓	✓	✓	✓
Uryū Ishida (Seele Schneider)	✗	✗	✗	✗	✓	✓	✓
Uryū Ishida EX	✓	✓	✓	✓	✗	✗	✓
Uryū Ishida (Quincy Gauntlet: Final Form)	✗	✗	✓	✓	✗	✓	✓
Yammy Riyalgo	✗	✗	✗	✓	✓	✓	✓
Yammy Riyalgo (Ira)	✗	✗	✗	✗	✗	✗	✓
Yasutora Sado	✗	✗	✗	✓	✓	✓	✓
Yasutora Sado (Brazo Izquierda del Diablo)	✗	✗	✗	✗	✓	✓	✓
Yasutora Sado EX	✓	✓	✓	✓	✗	✗	✓
Yachiru Kusajishi	✗	✗	✓	✓	✓	✓	✓
Yoruichi Shihouin	✗	✓	✓	✓	✓	✓	✓
Yumichika Ayasegawa	✗	✗	✗	✓	✓	✓	✓
Zommari Leroux	✗	✗	✗	✗	✗	✓	✓
Zommari Leroux (Brujería)	✗	✗	✗	✗	✗	✓	✓
Total	6	12	35	52	63	74	89

== Reception ==
Since the series has yet to see a release outside Japan, reviews on the Heat the Soul series from major English video game publications are scarce.

== See also ==
- Bleach
- List of Bleach video games
- List of PlayStation Portable games
