= Masakazu Morita =

Japanese voice actor and singer (born 1972)

- 森田 成一
- Born: October 21, 1972 (age 54); Sumida, Tokyo, Japan
- Occupations: Actor; voice actor; singer
- Years active: 1995–present
- Agent: Stay-Luck
- Notable work: Bleach as Ichigo Kurosaki and Hollow Ichigo; Final Fantasy X as Tidus; Sengoku Basara as Maeda Keiji; One Piece as Marco the Phoenix; Kingdom as Li Xin; Dragon Ball Super as Whis; The Legend of Heroes: Trails of Cold Steel as Lechter Arundel; Genshin Impact as Thoma

Masakazu Morita (森田 成一, Morita Masakazu; born October 21, 1972) is a Japanese actor, voice actor, and singer. He previously worked for Aoni Production. He is also the host of the radio show Bleach B-Station. He voiced Ichigo Kurosaki in Bleach, Maeda Keiji in Sengoku Basara, Marco the Phoenix in One Piece, Tidus in Final Fantasy X, Whis in Dragon Ball Super, Auel Neider in Mobile Suit Gundam Seed Destiny, Pegasus Seiya in Saint Seiya – Hades Chapter, Pod in Pokémon, Tenjuro Banno in Kamen Rider Drive, Ryō Yūki in Eden of the East, Li Xin in Kingdom, Thoma in Genshin Impact, and Lechter Arundel in The Legend of Heroes: Trails of Cold Steel series. He won the "Best Rookie Actor" at the first Seiyu Awards. He is also the official Japanese dubbing voice of Zac Efron.

== Career ==
Morita attended Kyoka Junior and Senior High School. When in high school, he joined the brass band club and was in charge of conducting the marching band, which led him to discover the joy of entertainment. He worked as an actor at NHK Promotion, studied under film director Yukio Fukamachi, and appeared in films, stage plays, and dramas. His motion capture for the role of Zell Dincht in the 1999 PlayStation game Final Fantasy VIII was his debut as an actor.

He voiced Tidus in Final Fantasy X. While originally only in charge of motion capturing for a role, after over one hundred people auditioned and no voice actor was chosen, Morita was finally called in for an audition and was hired. When he was chosen to play the role, he thought that he could handle it because he only had to do a voice. However, in reality, he was shocked when he heard his own voice on the recording and his motionless performance. When Morita met Hideo Ishikawa, Kazuya Nakai, and Hiroshi Kamiya, he came to respect the fun of voice acting and their attitude toward their work, and decided that he wanted to work in the same industry as them and join the same agency. On September 1, 2003, after working as a freelancer, he moved to Aoni Production, his first voice acting agency.

Morita voiced Ichigo Kurosaki in the anime series Bleach. He said that Ichigo was one of his favorite characters he ever played alongside Tidus, and in 2005 he was chosen to replace Tōru Furuya as the voice of the main character Pegasus Seiya in Saint Seiya: Hades. Morita was said to have shed tears of joy when he was chosen at the audition. He voiced Ryūji Takane, the main character in Ring ni Kakero 1, and was thus selected twice to play the lead in works written by Masami Kurumada.

In 2007, he won the Best Rookie Actor award at the 1st Seiyu Awards. In 2008, he returned to the stage as a guest performer in a performance by the K-Show theater company organized by Kentarō Itō, and in October 2009, he played his first leading role and first performance as a chairman.

In 2012, Morita made his debut as a singer with RING BONES. In 2013, he confessed on his Twitter page that he was in a critical situation at one point, between life and death due to anaphylactic shock. He said he had "almost died three times" due to anaphylactic shock, myocardial infarction, and side effects. However, thanks to the efforts of doctors, he recovered.

On December 31, 2020, he announced on Twitter that he would be leaving Aoni Production, the company to which he had belonged for seventeen years, and would be working as a freelancer from January 1, 2021.

On January 1, 2025, he announced on Twitter that he has joined Stay-Luck.

== Filmography ==
=== Anime series ===
- The Prince of Tennis (2001–2005), Tashiro
- Sonic X (2003), Chris Thorndyke (Adult)
- Interlude (2003), Unnamed protagonist
- Di Gi Charat Nyo! (2003), Omocha Yasushi
- One Piece (2003, 2009–2010, 2019), Marco
- Aqua Kids (2004), Juno
- Diamond Daydreams (2004), Yuu
- Beck (2004–2005), Masaru Hyōdō
- Mobile Suit Gundam SEED Destiny (2004–2005), Auel Neider
- Onmyō Taisenki (2004–2005), Yakumo Yoshikawa
- Ring ni Kakero (2004–2011), Ryuji Takane
- Bleach (2004–2012), Ichigo Kurosaki, Hollow Ichigo
- Major (2004), Toshiya Sato
- Case Closed (2005, 2007, 2020), Ryosuke Fukuma (Ep. 419–420), Naosuke Kurosawa (Ep. 478), Fusaya Oide (Ep. 990-991)
- La Corda d'Oro (2006), Hihara Kazuki
- Marginal Prince (2006), Alfred Visconti
- Baccano! (2007), Claire Stanfield
- Sengoku Basara: Samurai Kings (2009), Maeda Keiji
- Eden of the East (2009), Ryō Yūki
- Bakuman (2010–2011), Kazuya Hiramaru
- Sengoku Basara: Samurai Kings 2 (2010), Maeda Keiji
- SD Gundam Sangokuden Brave Battle Warriors (2010–2011), Ryomou Dijeh
- Pocket Monsters: Best Wishes! (2010–2011), Chili
- Tiger & Bunny (2011–2022), Barnaby Brooks Jr.
- Bakuman 2 (2011–2012), Kazuya Hiramaru
- Saint Seiya Omega (2012), Sagittarius Seiya (Ep. 90)
- Bakuman 3 (2012–2013), Kazuya Hiramaru
- Kingdom (2012–2022), Shin
- Hakkenden: Eight Dogs of the East (2013), Hazuki
- Ace of Diamond (2013–2015), Koichiro Tanba
- Yona of the Dawn (2014), Kija
- Sengoku Basara: End of Judgement (2014), Maeda Keiji
- World Trigger (2014), Shūji Miwa
- Rage of Bahamut: Genesis (2014), Azazel
- Kiniro no Corda Blue Sky (2014), Shiro Hozumi, Kazuki Hihara
- Death Parade (2015), Yōsuke Tateishi
- The Heroic Legend of Arslan (2015), Xandes
- Kuroko's Basketball Season 3 (2015), Shōgo Haizaki
- Baby Steps Season 2 (2015), Sakuya Takagi
- Dragon Ball Super (2015), Whis, Copy Vegeta, Iru
- Fafner in the Azure: Exodus (2015), Billy Morgan
- K: Return of Kings (2015), Yukari Mishakuji
- Big Order (2016), Eiji Hoshimiya
- Rewrite (2016–2017), Kotarō Tennōji
- Tiger Mask W (2016), Kazuchika Okada
- Rage of Bahamut: Virgin Soul (2017), Azazel
- Major 2nd (2018), Toshiya Satō
- Black Clover (2019), Raia (Ep. 87)
- Knights of the Zodiac: Saint Seiya (2019), Pegasus Seiya
- Shaman King (2021), Mosuke
- Kaginado (2021), Kotarō Tennōji
- Love of Kill (2022), Nikka
- Bleach: Thousand Year Blood War (2022–2026), Ichigo Kurosaki
- Delico's Nursery (2024), Dali Delico
- Go! Go! Loser Ranger! Season 2 (2025), Masashi Nishiki
- Roll Over and Die (2026), Dein Phineas

=== Original video animation ===
- Saint Seiya: Hades Chapter (2002–2008;OVA), Pegasus Seiya
- Bludgeoning Angel Dokuro-Chan (2005), Yamazaki
- Dragon Ball: Yo! Son Goku and His Friends Return!! (2008), Tarble
- Kite Liberator (2008), Rin Gaga
- Bungo Stray Dogs: Walk Alone (2017), Shōsaku Katsura

=== Anime films ===
- Bleach: Memories of Nobody (2006), Ichigo Kurosaki
- Bleach: The DiamondDust Rebellion (2007), Ichigo Kurosaki
- Bleach: Fade to Black (2008), Ichigo Kurosaki
- Eden of the East: The King of Eden (2009), Ryō Yūki
- Eden of the East: Paradise Lost (2010), Ryō Yūki
- Bleach: Hell Verse (2010), Ichigo Kurosaki
- Sengoku Basara: The Last Party (2011), Maeda Keiji
- Tiger & Bunny: The Beginning (2012), Barnaby Brooks Jr.
- Combustible (2013), Matsukichi
- Dragon Ball Z: Battle of Gods (2013), Whis
- K: Missing Kings (2014), Yukari Mishakuji
- Tiger & Bunny: The Rising (2014), Barnaby Brooks Jr.
- Dragon Ball Z: Resurrection 'F' (2015), Whis
- Dragon Ball Super: Broly (2018), Whis
- Dragon Ball Super: Super Hero (2022), Whis
- Gekijōban Collar × Malice Deep Cover (2023), Aiji Yanagi

=== Live action ===
- Zyuden Sentai Kyoryuger (Debo Tanabanta) (Ep. 20)
- Kamen Rider Drive Dr. Tenjuro Banno/Banno Driver/Gold Drive (Ep. 33 – 46), Sigma Circular (Male Voice) (Ep. 46 – 47) (Female Voice of Ayumi Fujimura)

=== Video games ===
- Final Fantasy X (2001), Tidus
- Kingdom Hearts (2002), Tidus
- Final Fantasy X-2 (2003), Tidus, Shuyin
- Summon Night: Swordcraft Story 2 (2004), (Loki)
- Sengoku Basara (2005), Maeda Keiji
- Riviera: The Promised Land (2005), Ledah
- Bleach: Heat the Soul (series) (2005–2010), Ichigo Kurosaki
- Sengoku Basara 2 (2006), Maeda Keiji
- Puyo Puyo! 15th Anniversary (2006), Schezo Wegey
- Dissidia Final Fantasy (2008), Tidus
- Signal (2009), (Yamato "None" Hoshoin)
- Puyo Puyo 7 (2009), Schezo Wegey
- Dissidia 012 Final Fantasy (2011), Tidus
- Puyo Puyo!! 20th Anniversary (2011) (Schezo Wegey)
- Sweet Fuse: At Your Side (2012) (Meoshi Kouta)
- One Piece: Pirate Warriors 2 (2013), Marco
- Puyo Puyo Tetris (2014), Schezo Wegey
- Final Fantasy Explorers (2014), Tidus
- Granblue Fantasy (2014), Meteon, Azazel
- Dissidia Final Fantasy NT (2015), Tidus
- Collar × Malice (2016), Aiji Yanagi
- World of Final Fantasy (2016), Tidus
- Jump Force (2019), Ichigo Kurosaki, Pegasus Seiya
- Arena of Valor (2018), Arthur (Japanese voice), (2021; Collab AOV x Bleach Event), Ichigo Kurosaki (skin)
- Genshin Impact (2021), Thoma
- Xenoblade Chronicles 3 (2022), Bolearis
- BLEACH Rebirth of Souls (2025), Ichigo Kurosaki
- The Red Bell's Lament (2025), Jack Graystone

=== Unknown date ===
- Bleach series (Ichigo Kurosaki)
- Bakumetsu Renka Shinsengumi (Kondo Hasami)
- Datenshi no Amai Yuuwaku x Kaikan Phrase (Yoshihiko "Santa" Nagai)
- Dragon Ball Heroes (Avatar: Saiyan (male), Berserker-type; Whis)
- Dragon Ball: Raging Blast 2 (Tarble)
- Dragon Ball Z: Ultimate Tenkaichi as Hero Modes 'Evil Voice'
- Dynasty Warriors 5 (Pang De)
- Final Fantasy VIII (Zell Dincht, motion capture)
- J-Stars Victory Vs (Ichigo Kurosaki, Pegasus Seiya)
- Kiniro no Corda series (Hihara Kazuki)
- Rewrite (Kotarou Tennouji)
- Riveria: The Promised Land (Ledah)
- Saint Seiya: Brave Soldiers (Pegasus Seiya)
- Saint Seiya Senki (Pegasus Seiya)
- Sengoku Basara 2 (Maeda Keiji)
- Shiratsuyu no Kai (Nakamachi Shin)
- The Legend of Heroes: Trails at Sunrise (Lechter Arundel)
- The Legend of Heroes: Trails from Zero (Lechter Arundel)
- The Legend of Heroes: Trails in the Sky the 3rd (Lechter Arundel)
- The Legend of Heroes: Trails of Cold Steel (Lechter Arundel)
- The Legend of Heroes: Trails of Cold Steel II (Lechter Arundel)
- The Legend of Heroes: Trails of Cold Steel III (Lechter Arundel)
- The Legend of Heroes: Trails of Cold Steel IV (Lechter Arundel)
- The Legend of Heroes: Trails into Reverie (Lechter Arundel)
- Tokimeki Memorial Girl's Side: 2nd Kiss (Saeki Teru)
- Transformers Armada The Game (Hot Shot)
- Yo-Jin-Bo: The Bodyguards (Yozaburo Shiraanui)

=== Drama CD ===
- Lupin III (2012) (Arsene Lupin)
- Special A (Tadashi Karino)
- Superior (Lakshri)
- Di[e]ce (Naoto Kanzaki)

=== Dubbing ===
- Zac Efron
  - The Derby Stallion (Patrick McCardle)
  - High School Musical (Troy Bolton)
  - High School Musical 2 (Troy Bolton)
  - High School Musical 3: Senior Year (Troy Bolton)
  - 17 Again (Mike O'Donnell (teenage))
  - Charlie St. Cloud (Charlie St. Cloud)
  - The Paperboy (Jack Jansen)
  - That Awkward Moment (Jason)
  - Neighbors (Teddy Sanders)
  - We Are Your Friends (Cole Carter)
  - Neighbors 2: Sorority Rising (Teddy Sanders)
  - Dirty Grandpa (Jason Kelly)
  - Baywatch (Matt Brody)
  - Extremely Wicked, Shockingly Evil and Vile (Ted Bundy)
  - Firestarter (Andy McGee)
  - The Greatest Beer Run Ever (John "Chickie" Donohue)
- The Edge of Seventeen (Nick Mossman (Alexander Calvert))
- El Camino Christmas (Eric Roth (Luke Grimes))
- The Green Hornet (Kato (Jay Chou))
- In Time (Timekeeper Jaeger (Collins Pennie))
- Mindhunter (Holden Ford (Jonathan Groff))
- Now You See Me 2 (Li (Jay Chou))
- Outlander (King Louis XV (Lionel Lingelser))
- Prometheus (Chance (Emun Elliott))
- The Time Traveler's Wife (Henry DeTamble (Theo James))

== Discography ==
=== Albums ===
Year	Single details	Catalog No.	Peak Oricon chart positions
2012	Semegiau Kakushitsu: Released: February 15, 2012; Label: Sony Music Direct; Format: CD	MHCL-2006	75
