= Bleach: The DiamondDust Rebellion =

2007 film by Noriyuki Abe

- Promotional poster for the film

Japanese name
- Kanji: 劇場版BLEACH The DiamondDust Rebellion もう一つの氷輪丸
Transcriptions
- Revised Hepburn: Gekijō-ban Burīchi Za Daiyamondo Dasuto Reberion Mō Hitotsu no Hyōrinmaru
- Directed by: Noriyuki Abe
- Written by: Michiko Yokote; Masahiro Ōkubo
- Based on: Bleach by Tite Kubo
- Produced by: Ken Hagino; Shunji Aoki; Mihiko Fukuzawa
- Starring: Masakazu Morita; Fumiko Orikasa; Romi Park; Akira Ishida
- Cinematography: Toshiyuki Fukushima
- Edited by: Hidetoshi Okuda; Junichi Uematsu
- Music by: Shirō Sagisu
- Production company: Studio Pierrot
- Distributed by: Toho
- Release date: December 22, 2007
- Running time: 95 minutes
- Country: Japan
- Language: Japanese
- Box office: ¥800 million (Japan)

Bleach: The DiamondDust Rebellion (Japanese: 劇場版BLEACH The DiamondDust Rebellion もう一つの氷輪丸, Hepburn: Gekijō-ban Burīchi Za Daiyamondo Dasuto Reberion Mō Hitotsu no Hyōrinmaru; lit. "Theatrical Feature Bleach: The DiamondDust Rebellion, Another Hyōrinmaru") is a 2007 Japanese animated supernatural adventure film and the second animated film adaptation of the anime and manga series Bleach. The film is directed by Noriyuki Abe, and co-written by Michiko Yokote and Masahiro Ōkubo. It premiered in Japan on December 22, 2007, in between episodes 153 and 154. The theme music for the film is "Rock of Light" (光のロック, Hikari no Rokku) by Sambomaster. The DVD of the film was released on September 6, 2008.

To promote the film, the opening and closing credits of the Bleach anime from episode 151-154 use footage from the film. Kubo also published a special manga chapter focusing on Hitsugaya's past to further promote the film. The English release of the DVD was on September 8, 2009, and it was aired on Adult Swim on December 5. The official European release of the film was on September 6, 2010 and in the United Kingdom on Blu-ray on May 7, 2012.

== Plot ==
Soul Reapers (Note: In the Bleach universe, Soul Reapers are soldiers trusted with ushering the souls of the dead from the World of the Living to the afterlife realm known as Soul Society and with fighting Hollows, monstrous lost souls who can harm both ghosts and humans) of the 10th Division—led by its captain Tōshirō Hitsugaya and vice-captain Rangiku Matsumoto—are sent to escort the "King's Seal", a rare artifact said to hold unlimited power. During the mission, the artifact is stolen in transit by a Soul Reaper, Sōjirō Kusaka, and two girls, Ying and Yang. Hitsugaya apparently recognized the Soul Reaper, who wounds him before retreating with the artifact. Hitsugaya abandons his post to pursue the man, leaving his squad to fend for themselves. Later, the Soul Society suspects Hitsugaya of treason, orders his immediate capture, and places his entire squad under house arrest.

In the human world, Substitute Soul Reaper Ichigo Kurosaki is informed of events in the Soul Society and finds Hitsugaya unconscious. Hitsugaya wakes up in Ichigo's house, and they are attacked by Ying and Yang. Ichigo fights, while Hitsugaya escapes and continues to avoid an attempt at capture by the Soul Society. Captain Shunsui Kyōraku of First Squad investigates the pattern of attack, but he is ambushed by Kusaka using Hyōrinmaru, a zanpakutō—special swords used by Soul Reapers—with identical powers to Hitsugaya's. In response, the suspicions on Hitsugaya escalates to a immediate execution by Gotei 13 leader, Genryūsai Shigekuni Yamamoto.

Through his wandering to avoid capture, Hitsugaya eventually manages to track Kusaka down, and it is revealed that the two have manifested the same 'zanpakutō'. They were best friends during the Soul Reaper Academy, but Soul Society does not allow the same zanpakutō to be wielded by different people, the two were forced to fight to the death. Hitsugaya did not wish to fight but had no choice as Kusaka attacked, claiming he was the only one worthy of Hyōrinmaru. The authorities concluded that Hitsugaya was the true owner of Hyōrinmaru and carried out Kusaka's execution. Kusaka died and was reborn as a Hollow in their world, Hueco Mundo. Once he learned of the King's Seal and its powers—which allow the user to freely manipulate time, space, and matter—he started his plan of revenge against Soul Society.

Using the King's Seal, Kusaka teleports Hitsugaya and himself to Soul Society, needing Hitsugaya's power to break the seal. The Soul Reapers find and attack Hitsugaya and Kusaka, but are thrown back when Ichigo intervenes. As Hitsugaya refuses, Kusaka breaks the seal himself, after which he transforms into a giant dragon-like creature made of ice. However, because he lacks the control that Hitsugaya possesses, the power goes berserk and threatens to destroy Soul Society. A horde of Hollows appears out of Kusaka's castle, which he had generated out of the King's Seal. While several Soul Reapers face the Hollows, Ichigo and Hitsugaya storm up to the central tower. After they destroy Kusaka's dragon-like form, Hitsugaya impales Kusaka. Hitsugaya is cleared of all charges, and the King's Seal is restored. Soon after, he and Rangiku visit Kusaka's grave.

== Production ==
Tite Kubo, author from the Bleach manga, authored a one-shot based on Tōshirō, prior to the film's premier in order to promote it. He was also allowed to participate in the making of the film, to design the character of Kusaka. However, Kubo could not add Kusaka to his one-shot due to the fact the original concept came from the manga. In order to promote the second film of Bleach, the trailer had the line "Execute Hitsugaya!". Kubo admitted that it was his own idea to make everybody be surprised, but he and Masakazu Morita, the voice actor of Ichigo Kurosaki, received a lot of letters from worried fans, causing Kubo to apologize in response.

== Cast ==
Character	Japanese voice	English voice
Ichigo Kurosaki	Masakazu Morita; Yuki Matsuoka (child)	Johnny Yong Bosch; Mona Marshall (child)
Tōshirō Hitsugaya	Romi Park	Steve Staley
Rukia Kuchiki	Fumiko Orikasa	Michelle Ruff
Renji Abarai	Kentarō Itō	Wally Wingert
Rangiku Matsumoto	Kaya Matsutani	Megan Hollingshead
Sōjirō Kusaka	Akira Ishida	Keith Silverstein
Ying	Aya Hisakawa	Kate Higgins
Yang	Yukana	Tara Platt
Hyōrinmaru	Daisuke Matsuoka	Travis Willingham

== Reception ==
The film opened in 4th place at the Japanese box office, and held a top ten location until its 5th week.

The DVD release of the film was the first best selling anime DVD released that week, and is now released in many different languages.

== Other media ==
A light novel adaptation of movie was released on December 22, 2007.

Sōjirō Kusaka in the PSP video game Bleach: Heat the Soul 5, Bleach: Heat the Soul 6 and Bleach: Heat the Soul 7 as a playable character. The story and characters also made an appearance in the game Bleach: Brave Souls.
