= Bleach: Memories of Nobody =

2006 Japanese anime film

- Promotional poster for the film
- Directed by: Hideki Tachibana (chief); Noriyuki Abe
- Written by: Masashi Sogo; Natsuko Takahashi
- Based on: Bleach by Tite Kubo
- Produced by: Ken Hagino; Mikihiko Fukuzawa
- Starring: Masakazu Morita; Fumiko Orikasa; Chiwa Saitō; Kentarō Itō; Romi Park; Ryōtarō Okiayu; Masashi Ebara
- Cinematography: Toshiyuki Fukushima
- Edited by: Hidetoshi Okuda; Junichi Uematsu
- Music by: Shirō Sagisu
- Production company: Pierrot
- Distributed by: Toho
- Release date: December 16, 2006
- Running time: 93 minutes
- Country: Japan
- Language: Japanese
- Box office: ¥660 million (Japan)

Bleach: Memories of Nobody (Note: 劇場版BLEACH MEMORIES OF NOBODY (Japanese: Gekijō-ban Burīchi Memorīzu obu Nōbadi, Hepburn: lit. 'Theatrical Feature Bleach: Memories of Nobody"')) is a 2006 Japanese animated supernatural adventure film and the first film adaptation of the anime and manga series Bleach. Directed by Noriyuki Abe and written by Masashi Sogo, the film was first released in Japanese theaters on December 16, 2006. In the film, strange white beings start appearing in Karakura Town, along with a mysterious soul reaper named Senna. The DVD was released in Japan on September 5, 2007. To promote the film, the opening and closing credits for episodes 106 through 109 of the Bleach anime use footage from the film. The film's theme music is "Sen no Yoru o Koete" (千の夜をこえて; lit. "Crossing over a Thousand Nights) by Aqua Timez. The film had a limited theatrical release in the United States from June 11 to 12, 2008, and in Canada on October 20, 2008 and was followed by the DVD release on October 14, 2008. The film aired on September 5, 2009, on Adult Swim. The Blu-ray was released on May 7, 2012, in the United Kingdom.

== Plot ==
Ichigo Kurosaki and Rukia Kuchiki are Soul Reapers, soldiers trusted with ushering the souls of the dead from the World of the Living to the afterlife realm known as Soul Society and with fighting Hollows, monstrous lost souls, that are invisible to ordinary human eyes who can harm both ghosts and humans. After defeating a Hollow in a local park, unidentified ghost-like spirits begin to appear, before a mysterious Soul Reaper named Senna appears and destroys the spirits. Ichigo and Rukia confront her, but she refuses to answer any questions and leaves. Ichigo follows Senna, while Rukia returns to the Soul Society in search of answers.

While pursuing Senna, Ichigo meets Soul Society's envoys who are on Earth to investigate the mysterious reflections of the human world that appears in the Soul Society. They discover that the spirits seen earlier are "Blanks", a group of amnesiac souls that were lost in the space between the Soul Society and the real world, and whose memories combine to form a single entity, the "Shinenju". In this in-between space, the spirits form the "Valley of Screams"; although it is a natural phenomenon, its colliding with the two worlds, which is not natural. So they deduce someone is doing it to obtain the Shinenju, and the Soul Reapers assembled separate to find it. Later, Senna is attacked by the mysterious group, but Ichigo saves Senna and fends them off.

After Ichigo and Senna reunite two lost souls, several Soul Society's officers and some armed forces declares that Senna is the real Shinenju and orders Ichigo to hand her over (this is why Senna recalls random memories contradicting each other, as none of them belonged to her), but Ichigo refuses, valuing her as a being. He reassures Senna that regardless of how she was conceived, she is still her own person. The mysterious group calling themselves the "Dark Ones", exiled from the Soul Society seeking revenge for the past, arrives and captures Senna, while fighting off the Soul Reapers. The Dark Ones take Senna to the Valley of Screams, and attach her to a device powered by the Blanks that can cause the Valley to collapse, resulting in a destructive collision between the real world and the Soul Society.

Rukia goes to get reinforcements from the Soul Society, but their head-captain wants to destroy the Valley before it collapses and refuses to order a rescue mission with less than an hour. At the Valley, Ichigo fails to defeat the large number of Blanks and the Dark Ones, but he is saved by the arrival of his Soul Reaper counterparts. In the meantime, the head-captain is convinced to prolong the destruction of the Valley, so the Soul Reaper forces in there may complete the mission and escape the Valley beforehand. The Soul Reapers quickly defeat the Dark Ones and Blanks, and Ichigo defeats their leader, Ganryu. The Soul Reaper forces then quickly leave the portal of the Valley and return to the real world, content in finishing the mission.

However, the process of the collapse continues, before Senna sacrifices herself to push the two worlds back apart. Afterwards, when both worlds have been saved, Senna, weakened by her efforts asks Ichigo to take her to the graveyard so she can see her name on her gravestone, which had one of the names of a Blank whose memory Senna had. Ichigo lies and tells her that her name is on it. Believing him, she expresses contentment that she once had her own life before fading away. Rukia notes that once the power of the Blanks fades away, so will all memories of Senna, as she never existed. After the credits, Ichigo sees a red ribbon (he bought for Senna) floating down from the sky near the bridge, and sees a girl resembling her. He happily keeps their memory to himself.

== Voice cast ==
| Character | Japanese Voice actor | English Voice actor |
|---|---|---|
| Ichigo Kurosaki | Masakazu Morita | Johnny Yong Bosch |
| Rukia Kuchiki | Fumiko Orikasa | Michelle Ruff |
| Senna | Chiwa Saitō | G.K. Bowes |
| Renji Abarai | Kentarō Itō | Wally Wingert |
| Toshiro Hitsugaya | Romi Park | Steve Staley |
| Byakuya Kuchiki | Ryōtarō Okiayu | Dan Woren |
| Ganryu | Masashi Ebara | Troy Baker |
| Jai | Dai Matsumoto | JB Blanc |
| Benin | Yōko Sōmi | Wendee Lee |
| Riyan | Daisuke Egawa | Kirk Thornton |
| Bau | Hajime Iijima | Kyle Hebert |
| Mue | Takashi Kondo | Vic Mignogna |

== Reception ==
Bradley Meek of T.H.E.M. Anime Reviews had expected to dislike the film, and found himself pleasantly surprised that he enjoyed the film. He felt that the film was made purely to please fans, and that those fans would be pleased. He criticized the opening sequence and some other scenes as excessively confusing and incoherent, but praises the character Senna as "a sweet character who is likeable from pretty much frame one." Anime News Network's Carl Kimlinger agreed that the film was primarily for series fan and would be confusing to newcomers to the franchise. While he felt the film followed the basic formula for "theatrical adaptations of long-running shounen series" and attempts to cram a lot in a short time, he also felt it was "unfailingly entertaining throughout." Fellow ANN reviewer Carlo Santos described it as "an extended filler episode" with the addition of new "disposable characters", however it notes that with a theatrical production budget the film is "a jaw-dropping, fist-pumping 'Best Of' compilation of all the shikai, bankai, and fighting styles that make the series so dynamic". He had mixed feelings about the film's soundtrack, noting that most was lifted from the series while praising the few new musical pieces as being "well-written" and well used.

Beth Accomando of KPBS praised the film's artistry and the complex mix of themes and idealisms presented in the story. In particular, she found the film's concept of "Blanks" conveyed "a deep spiritual sadness that provides unexpected depth to this supernatural action thriller." Chris Beveridge of Mania.com felt the film met his expectations with its "high production values, a solid if predictable script and some really neat designs", yet noted that its weakness was its lack of relevance to the series and offers no permanent character growth.

== Other media ==
The light novel adaptation of the film was published on December 18, 2006. Senna appears as a playable character in three PlayStation Portable video games, Bleach: Heat the Soul 5, 6, and 7. The story and characters also made an appearance in the game Bleach: Brave Souls.

Some plot concepts from the film would go on to be incorporated into the main Bleach literary media, such as the Valley of Screams, which was later introduced in the original manga series, and the Ryuudouji clan, which was directly mentioned in the Bleach novel series Can't Fear Your Own World.
