= Superior (manga) =

Japanese manga series

- First volume cover

シューピアリア (Shūpiaria)
- Genre: Adventure; Fantasy; Romance
- Manga
- Written by: Ichtys
- Published by: Square Enix
- Magazine: Gangan Powered
- Original run: June 22, 2004 – February 21, 2009
- Volumes: 9
- Manga

Superior Cross
- Written by: Ichtys
- Published by: Square Enix
- Magazine: Monthly GFantasy
- Original run: April 18, 2009 – August 18, 2011
- Volumes: 6
- icon

Superior (Japanese: シューピアリア, Hepburn: Shūpiaria) is a Japanese manga series written and illustrated by Ichtys. The story centers around the Hero Exa and the Demon Queen Sheila along with the corresponding war between the demon and human races. It was published in Square Enix's Gangan Powered from June 2004 to February 2009. After Gangan Powered ceased its publication, the series was transferred to Monthly GFantasy, and re-titled Superior Cross, and serialized from April 2009 to August 2011. A drama CD was released by Frontier Works in March 2007.

== Plot ==
Superior takes place in a world where humans and monsters co-exist, but for many years, both races have been at war, aiming for the complete extermination of each other. The powerful Demon Queen Sheila arises to lead the monsters. She is extremely powerful, and slays half of humanity by herself. The surviving humans elect a Hero, Exa, to kill the Demon Queen and liberate humanity from her oppressive rule. But Exa questions his mission. He is anguished by the knowledge that all monsters are living creatures, the same as humans, and he does not wish to kill any of them. Sheila becomes interested in Exa's principles and decides to infiltrate his side. Eventually she realizes that she has fallen in love with Exa, who, despite his desire for peaceful co-existence, has vowed to kill the Demon Queen himself.

== Characters ==
Sheila (シーラ, Shira)
The Demon Queen is a powerful figure who once eradicated half of humanity and subjugated all monsters. A traumatic loss in her youth solidified her goal of creating a world exclusively for monsters by exterminating humans. She initially approaches the Hero Exa with the intention of assassinating him, but unexpectedly develops genuine romantic feelings for him. Assuming the identity of a meek monster named Sheila, she accompanies him on his journey. Throughout their travels, Exa's influence gradually softens her sadistic nature, leading to an internal conflict between revealing her true identity or maintaining her deceptive facade to remain at his side.
Exa (エクサ, Ekusa)
Voiced by: Showtaro Morikubo
Exa dreams of a world where humans and monsters coexist peacefully, valuing all life and seeking to end the war without further extermination. He makes a sole exception for the Demon Lord, whom he holds responsible for devastating atrocities, including the murder of his family. Exa believes the Demon Lord's death is necessary for peace, unaware that his companion, Sheila, is that very individual. When Sheila reveals her identity, Exa is enraged and attacks her in a violent frenzy, even striking allies who intervene. During the ensuing confrontation, they fall into a volcanic fissure. To save the others, Sheila sacrifices herself, but Exa rescues her, ultimately choosing her life over his vengeance.
Lakshri (ラクシュリ, Rakushuri)
Voiced by: Masakazu Morita
Lakshri is Exa's right-hand man. Once consumed by violence, he was reformed through Exa's influence and swore lifelong loyalty to him. While a good friend to Exa, Lakshri lacks his companion's humility, frequently bragging about his own prowess. He displays a marked immaturity, particularly around Angelica or Crowe, and becomes easily infatuated with women.
Angelica (アンジェリカ, Anjerika)
Voiced by: Rie Kugimiya
Of quarter-monster heritage, Angelica possesses extremely strong inherited magical abilities. Abused as a child for her demonic traits, she is devoted to Exa, who was the first to show her kindness. Her jeweled staff controls and limits her power rather than enhancing it. Angelica's right eye is red from her monster blood, a trait she hides behind her bangs to avoid conflict with humans. Though typically kind and gentle, she displays superhuman strength when angered, most often toward Lakshri. She later discovers her monster grandfather, who explains he was driven from his home by humans but never stopped loving his family.
Copy (コピー, Kopi)
Voiced by: Yūko Kaida
A creation of Sheila's to conceal her true identity, the current Demon Queen is a reckless and violent entity who views all humans and monsters as expendable. Her objective is to break apart the Hero and Sheila, intending to kill them both to prove her supremacy and claim dominion over the world. After confronting them separately, she resolves to orchestrate a unified effort among monsters to eradicate humanity.

Juno Obsidias (ジュノー ・オブシディアス, Juno Obushidiasu)

Voiced by: Mitsuki Saiga
The son of the King initially idolizes Exa as a champion who will help exterminate monsters. He is severely disappointed upon discovering Exa's pacifist philosophy, particularly when Exa refuses to kill humanoid monsters. The Prince's perspective changes after being spared by one of those very monsters, leading him to convert to Exa's beliefs and become a valuable ally. It is the Prince who sends his aide to warn Exa of his suspicion that Sheila is the true Demon Queen.
Kagami (かがみ)
Voiced by: Takehito Koyasu
A tentacled monster with the ability to control minds, Kagami has served as Sheila's guardian since her childhood. Having admired Sheila's mother, he vowed to groom Sheila to be the perfect Demon Lord after her parents were killed by humans. Kagami despises Exa for being the reason behind Sheila's change of heart.

== Publication ==
Written and illustrated by Ichtys, Superior was serialized in Square Enix's Gangan Powered from June 22, 2004, to February 21, 2009. It was then transferred to Monthly GFantasy, re-titled Superior Cross (シューピアリア・クロス, Shūpiaria Kurosu), and serialized from April 18, 2009, to August 18, 2011. (Note: It finished in the magazine's September 2011 issue, released on August 18 of that same year.) Square Enix collected the series's chapters into individual tankōbon volumes. Nine volumes of Superior were released from March 22, 2005, to April 22, 2009. Six volumes of Superior Cross were released from September 26, 2009, to October 27, 2011.

=== Volumes ===
==== Superior ====
No.	Release date	ISBN
1	March 22, 2005	978-4-7575-1392-1
2	December 22, 2005	978-4-7575-1588-8
3	November 22, 2006	978-4-7575-1813-1
4	February 22, 2007	978-4-7575-1945-9
5	August 22, 2007	978-4-7575-2080-6
6	February 22, 2008	978-4-7575-2218-3
7	June 21, 2008	978-4-7575-2302-9
8	December 22, 2008	978-4-7575-2460-6
9	April 22, 2009	978-4-7575-2539-9

==== Superior Cross ====
No.	Release date	ISBN
1	September 26, 2009	978-4-7575-2691-4
2	March 27, 2010	978-4-7575-2835-2
3	July 27, 2010	978-4-7575-2949-6
4	November 27, 2010	978-4-7575-3079-9
5	June 27, 2011	978-4-7575-3215-1
6	October 27, 2011	978-4-7575-3401-8
