= Ichigo Kurosaki =

Fictional character from Bleach

- Bleach character
- Ichigo Kurosaki as illustrated by Tite Kubo
- First appearance: Bleach #1 "Death & Strawberry" (2001)
- Created by: Tite Kubo
- Portrayed by: Sota Fukushi; Kaito Takamura (child)
- Voiced by: Japanese; Masakazu Morita; Yuki Matsuoka (child); English; Johnny Yong Bosch; Mona Marshall (child)

In-universe information
- Gender: Male
- Family: Isshin Kurosaki (father); Masaki Kurosaki (mother, deceased); Yuzu Kurosaki (sister); Karin Kurosaki (sister); Kūkaku Shiba (cousin); Ganju Shiba (cousin); Kaien Shiba (cousin, deceased)
- Spouse: Orihime Inoue
- Children: Kazui Kurosaki (son)
- Relatives: Sora Inoue (brother-in-law, deceased)
- Nationality: Japanese

Ichigo Kurosaki (Japanese: 黒崎 一護, Hepburn: Kurosaki Ichigo) is a fictional character and the main protagonist of the Bleach manga series and its adaptations created by author Tite Kubo. He is a teenage boy with ginger hair who receives Soul Reaper powers after meeting Rukia Kuchiki, a Soul Reaper assigned to patrol around the fictional city of Karakura Town. These powers come at the cost of her own, and as a result, he concedes to work as her stand-in, fighting to protect people from evil spirits called Hollows and sending good spirits, wholes, to a dimension known as the Soul Society. When Rukia is captured and sentenced to be executed, Ichigo goes after her in the Soul Society. To save her, he must learn Bankai. Ichigo appears in other media after the manga series, including the anime television series, four anime films, two original video animations, rock musicals, several video games, light novels and the 2018 live-action film.

Ichigo is voiced by Masakazu Morita in the Japanese anime adaptation; Johnny Yong Bosch in the English dubbing; and played by Sota Fukushi in the live-action film.

Ichigo's character has been well received among both readers and reviewers. He featured often in Weekly Shōnen Jump character popularity polls, and was consistently ranked as the most popular character in Bleach. The 2007 Japanese Newtype magazine polls ranked Ichigo as one of the top 100 most-loved anime characters. He is also known as one of the big three anime characters, including Naruto and Luffy. Reviewers of the series have praised his personality, though some consider him to be a stereotypical anti-hero. Critics have expressed dislike, however, for Ichigo's anticlimactic fights in the latter half of the series' due to his lack of memorable scenes at those points. Merchandise based on Ichigo's likeness has also been released, including toys, clothing and action figures.

== Creation and conception ==
When drawing the manga series, Tite Kubo commented that Rukia Kuchiki, the first Bleach character he introduced, was originally intended to be the protagonist. Through subsequent development of the series, however, Kubo decided to make her a valued ally and instead introduced Ichigo as the central character of the manga series. Initial design sketches show Ichigo wearing glasses, and having dark hair and softer eyes. When designing Rukia, Kubo modified Ichigo's appearance to contrast with hers, giving Ichigo orange hair, a trademark scowl, and removing the glasses. Rukia's first name was conceived as a result of Kubo hearing the Latin name for cosmos on television, and later decided that the name really suited her since the Latin word from which her name is derived means "light" and Kubo sees her as "a ray of light for Ichigo." Shonen Jump asked in an interview if Kubo had any plans to make Ichigo and Rukia a couple, but Kubo chose neither to confirm nor deny it. During the series' first chapter, Ichigo's wristwatch was based on one Kubo himself wore at the time. In later chapters, his wristwatch was based on Naoto Fukasawa's W11K cellphone. According to Kubo, Ichigo, along with Orihime Inoue, are the most arduous characters to sketch. While illustrating one of Ichigo's scenes, Kubo found it awkward to draw him with a cheerful smile.

Kubo attributes Ichigo's popularity among readers to the fact that he "looks cool". He also mentioned that as people read more about him they will discover that he is a warm and kind-hearted person. Kubo has stated that Ichigo's greatest strength is his considerate and thoughtful nature. He always thinks about other's needs. However, he noted it as his greatest weakness, since worrying about his friends tends to put him in danger. When asked in an interview if he had any plans to focus on the love triangle between Ichigo, Orihime, and Rukia, Kubo chose neither to confirm nor deny it as he did not want to focus on romance.

Following over fifty volumes of the manga's released, Kubo believes that Ichigo was the most developed character. He said that Ichigo leads the story and introduces readers to the events in it. When the Arrancar arc ended, Kubo rebooted the series which resulted in Ichigo losing his Soul Reaper powers. In the same way Ichigo became a Soul Reaper during the series' first chapter; he starts searching for methods to recover his original powers. During the story arc, Ichigo wears a new outfit after developing his Fullbring powers. Kubo wanted to bring the readers a feeling of uneasiness when creating this design as it resembles more of a tokusatsu character rather than his kimono counterpart from the Soul Reaper form to the point it would fit Ginjou Shinjo better. As a result, Kubo noted that readers were relieved reobtained his Soul Reaper as he once again wore a kimono despite being sightly different from the original one.

=== Casting ===
Ichigo is voiced by Masakazu Morita as a teenager and Yuki Matsuoka as a child for the Japanese anime. Morita said that Ichigo was one of his favorite characters he ever played, alongside Tidus in Final Fantasy X. While describing Ichigo as one of his best roles, Morita notes that voicing him can be at times difficult.

Johnny Yong Bosch voiced him as a teenager and Mona Marshall as a child for the English dub. Bosch has enjoyed voicing Ichigo's character due to his personal interest in the character's morals. However, he experienced difficulty voicing him in some scenes where Ichigo shouts for a long time.

Sota Fukushi played Ichigo in the live-action adaptation of the series with the storyline's first arc, with Bosch reprising his role in the English dub.

== Appearances ==
=== In Bleach ===
A collection of some of Ichigo's multiple forms by Tite Kubo

Ichigo is one of the students attending Karakura High School and having the ability to see ghosts. He meets a Soul Reaper named Rukia Kuchiki from a secret organization called the Soul Society, who are in charge of sending souls to the afterlife. At the same time, Ichigo's younger sisters are attacked by a Hollow, a deceased spirit becoming a warped soul-eating monster which Soul Reapers deal with. After being wounded in an attempt to save Ichigo from a Hollow attack, Rukia transfers her Soul Reaper powers to him so he can save his family. In the following months, Ichigo acts in Rukia's place as the Soul Reaper in protecting Karakura Town from Hollows as their friendship continues to grow. Ichigo's past is also revealed as he faces the Grand Fisher, a hollow who killed his mother when he was nine years old. In time, the Soul Society sends two high-seated officers to take Rukia back for committing the crime of transferring her Soul Reaper powers to a human. In training with Kisuke Urahara in order to rescue Rukia, Ichigo obtains his own Soul Reaper powers and learns the name of his Zanpakutō, Zangetsu (斬月; literally “Slaying Moon”), turning his Zanpakutō into Shikai state. He takes his friends with him to the Soul Society: Sado “Chad” Yasutora, Orihime Inoue, and Uryū Ishida. Ichigo is confronted by members of Gotei 13, the main military force in the Soul Society. As he approaches the prison where she is being held captive, Ichigo does battle with, faces and defeats other Soul Reapers, including Renji Abarai, Kenpachi Zaraki, and Byakuya Kuchiki, who adopted Rukia as his sister. For his match against Byakuya, Ichigo learns his Bankai state, Tensa Zangetsu (天鎖斬月; literally “Heaven Chain Slaying Moon”), which highly increases his speed. After a long fight, he defeats Byakuya, who confesses why he tried to kill his sister. Sousuke Aizen, who faked his death prior, have been behind Rukia's sentencing and the chaos that plagued the Soul Society. He leaves the Soul Society and flees to the realm of Hollows, Hueco Mundo.

In time, Aizen targets Karakura Town with an army of Arrancars, Hollows that assumed human form with Soul Reaper powers, after subjecting them to the Hōgyoku. In order to defeat the Arrancars and to control his Hollow powers, Ichigo begins to train with the group of Soul Reaper outcasts known as the Vizard. During the invasion of Karakura Town, Ichigo's friend Orihime Inoue has been abducted by Ulquiorra Cifer, one of Aizen's strongest Arrancars: The Espadas. Ichigo and his friends independently head to Hueco Mundo to find Orihime. After defeating the Espada Grimmjow Jaegerjaquez, Ichigo manages to save Orihime and defeat Ulquiorra using his internal power of hollow. Soon after, Ichigo returns from Hueco Mundo to Karakura Town, and confront Aizen. During the battle interim, Ichigo learns an ultimate technique called the Final Getsuga Tenshō (最後の月牙天衝, Saigo no Getsuga Tenshō; literally “The Final Moon Fang Heaven-Piercer”) that weakens Aizen at the cost of all his powers, allowing Urahara to seal him within a kidō barrier.

Seventeen months later, Ichigo becomes a senior in high school. The start of the Lost Agent arc describes his life after losing his power. One day, he meets Kūgo Ginjō, a Fullbringer and leader of the Xcution. Ginjo offers to replenish Ichigo's Soul Reaper powers in return for helping him and his group to become ordinary humans. With their help, Ichigo unlocks his own Fullbring powers through his Substitute Soul Reaper Badge. However, Ichigo later learns that Ginjo and his ally Shūkurō Tsukishima, the former leader of the Xcution who is a Fullbringer with ability to change people's memories, used him to take Fullbring powers for Xcution's use. Rukia transfers the Reiatsu of the Gotei 13's senior officers and other Soul Reapers through a special sword and restores Ichigo's Soul Reaper powers. Ichigo fights Ginjo with his improved Shinigami powers and during their duel, it is revealed that Ginjo was the first Substitute Soul Reaper. Despite learning the truth, Ichigo resolves to protect everyone and help other Soul Reapers defeat Ginjo. Though learning from Ginjō that the Soul Society monitor and limit their powers, Ichigo promises the Soul Reapers to continue fighting by their side.

While patrolling Karakura Town, Ichigo is informed about the invasion of Hueco Mundo by Wandenreich, a group of Quincies. He goes to Hueco Mundo with his friends to liberate it from one of the Wandenreich's high-ranked officers Quilge Opie. Later, Ichigo finds out that the Quincies are attacking the Soul Society. Arriving just after Captain Commander Yamamoto's death, Ichigo encounters the Wandenreich's leader Yhwach. During the fight against Yhwach that ends with a draw, Ichigo's Tensa Zangetsu is shattered and Yhwach leaves the Soul Society. Ichigo returns to the World of the Living, where he learns the truth that his mother was a pure-blood Quincy who was on a verge of hollowification after she was infected by White, Aizen's experimental Hollow. She was saved by Isshin at the cost of his Soul Reaper powers. Ichigo later learns that entity he believed to be Zangetsu is actually the embodiment of his Quincy powers while his inner Hollow is the True Zangetsu. Despite this, Ichigo still accepts him as he gains his reforged True Zanpakutō in its split True Shikai state. During the second invasion by the Wandenreich, Ichigo and his friends confront Yhwach at the Soul King's Palace. Ichigo gets overwhelmed with his True Bankai state broken, but Tsukishima and Orihime's combined efforts fixed True Tensa Zangetsu. Together with Uryū, Renji and Aizen, Ichigo finally defeats Yhwach.

As revealed in the light novel Bleach: Can't Fear Your Own World, Ichigo was a potential heir of the Soul King due to the nature of his origins and was spared the burden when a new Soul King was created from Yhwach's remains. In the manga's epilogue, taking place ten years after Yhwach's defeat, Ichigo and Orihime had a son named Kazui who destroys the remnants of Yhwach's power.

=== In other media ===
Ichigo appears in four films for the series, including Memories of Nobody, The DiamondDust Rebellion, Fade to Black and Hell Verse. He also appears in both of the original video animations; fighting against a Hollow called the Grand Fisher in the first one and combating the rogue Soul Reaper Baishin in the second. In the Bleach video games, Ichigo is a playable character, including the Heat the Soul and Blade Battlers series. In some games, his Hollow form and Bankai state are available as separate characters. In Rock Musical Bleach, a musical based on the Bleach series, Ichigo is played by Tatsuya Isaka. His character is featured in two volumes from the Bleach Beat Collection CD soundtrack series which features themes composed by his Japanese voice actor, Masakazu Morita. These include the first of them, in which he is the only character and the fourth season's fourth volume along with Rukia. Ichigo also appears in the first volume of Bleach Breathless Collection CD soundtrack series together with the embodiment of his Quincy powers that posed as the Zanpakutō spirit Zangetsu.

Ichigo appears as a playable character in Jump Force.

In December 2025, Ichigo, alongside fellow characters Rukia, Uryū and Orihime would appear as purchasable skins in Fortnite.

== Reception ==
=== Popularity ===
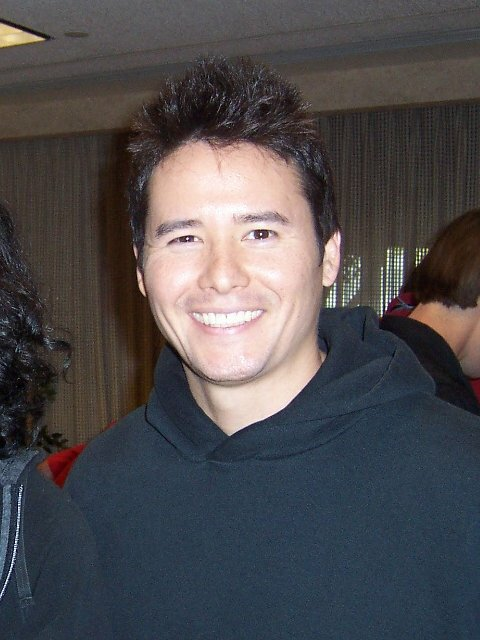
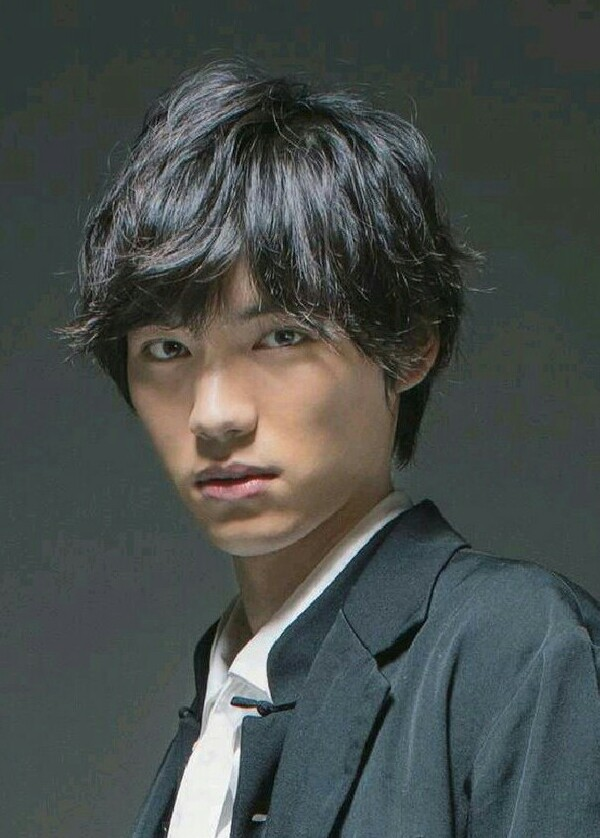
Johnny Yong Bosch (left) voiced Ichigo in the English version of the anime and Sota Fukushi (right) portrays the character in the live-action film.

Amongst the Bleach reader base, Ichigo has been always highly ranked in the Weekly Shōnen Jump popularity polls for the series. He has usually taken first place, though in early 2008 he dropped to third. His sword, Zangetsu, also ranked third in the Zanpakutō popularity polls. In the 2007 Japanese Newtype magazine poll, Ichigo was ranked one of the best male anime characters. In the Society for the Promotion of Japanese Animation (SPJA), Ichigo was elected for the best anime male character in 2008. The Japanese music distributor Recochoku has made two annual survey of which anime characters that people would like to marry. Ichigo ranked tenth in the category "The Character I Want to Be My Groom" from the 2008 survey and eight in the 2009 poll. Wizard Entertainment considered Ichigo the best hero from 2007, commenting that he does not try to be a typical hero but he fights in order to protect his friends. He was also 20th in IGN's "Top 25 Anime Characters of All Time" with comments focused on his design and personality. Ichigo has also appeared twice in the Anime Grand Prix polls, ranking as one of the most popular male anime characters. At the first Seiyu Awards in March 2007, Masakazu Morita won in the category "Best Rookie Actor" for his role as Ichigo Kurosaki. Ichigo's voice actor in the English adaptation, Johnny Yong Bosch, has also been praised for his voice work on Ichigo's character by Anime News Network (ANN), which favorably compared Bosch and Morita's work. Various merchandise based on Ichigo's appearance has been created, including action figures, plush toys and key-chains. Since the series was released, replica models of Ichigo's Zanpakutō and Bankai have been produced for purchase by collectors and fans.

=== Critical response ===
Several publications for manga, anime, video games, and other related media have provided praise and criticism on Ichigo's character. ANN's Melissa Harper commented that Ichigo's initial rebellious actions make him almost a stereotypical anti-hero, but note that he is soon revealed to be a more complex character with a sad past. Los Angeles Times's Charles Solomon comments Ichigo's character has little in common with protagonists from other series due to his bad temper and how he tends to fight. However, he added that readers from the series still "love" Ichigo. The way Ichigo becomes a Soul Reaper was found to be relatively common by Carlos Alexandre. He noted that Ichigo's character of a "tough guy with a heart of gold" had already been done in several series. Charles White from IGN praised Ichigo's climactic fight against Byakuya Kuchiki as one of the best fights in the Bleach series, and later Ramsey Isler gave additional praise to both the design and voice acting for Ichigo's inner Hollow.

Ichigo's development during the Rescue arc in which he sets to save Rukia Kuchiki from being executed have been praised by ANN's Theron Martin. He praised the scenes in which Ichigo manages to stop Rukia's execution and his subsequent demonstration of his Bankai as one of the "eminently satisfying landmark moments in the series". Wired News's Corrina Lawson stated that she liked Ichigo's strong sense of responsibility, and commented it was one of the reasons of the series' popularity. However, the early dynamic between Ichigo and Rukia was the subject of criticism as Film School Rejects was disappointed that the latter was reduced from a strong Soul Reaper into a weak supporting character as the former becomes the lead character with her powers. Anime News Network criticized the handling of how Ichigo faced off his biggest nemesis in the following arcs, Aizen and Ginjou. While the former was seen as anticlimactic and might have given the series a proper ending, the latter instead made no impact to his character despite their misrelationship caused by Ginjou's plans. Similarly, for the final fight in the manga between Ichigo and his allies against Yhwach for lacking any entertainment, giving a rushed feeling due to all characters assisting him briefly and how Ichigo became able to wield powers of every type of character in the process. Comic Book Resources noted a common complaint the fandom has had about Ichigo is that he is overpowered, constantly gaining new powers with ease. With the final story arc, it was revealed that two of the biggest villains were behind his birth, which divided the fandom in regards to whether or not Ichigo being overpowered was rewarding or just.

During the serialization of the manga, Tite Kubo said he received a letter from a reader who decided to name his son Ichigo. This brought joy as well as fear to the manga artist due to how his work influenced other people. While feeling that he also made a good manga during this comment, Kubo decided to work more on the character in hopes that once the real Ichigo grows up, he would feel proud with his name.

== See also ==
- List of Bleach characters
