= Noriyuki Abe =

Japanese anime storyboard artist, sound director, and director

- Occupations: Storyboard artist, sound director, director

Noriyuki Abe (阿部 記之 (formerly 阿部 紀之), Abe Noriyuki) is a Japanese anime storyboard artist, sound director, and director. He worked at Studio Pierrot on anime series, such as Yu Yu Hakusho, Ninku, Flame of Recca, Great Teacher Onizuka, Bleach, and Boruto. He won the Animage Anime Grand Prix award in 1993 and 1994.

== Works ==
- Norakuro (1987 TV series) – Episode director
- Musashi, the Samurai Lord (1990 TV series) – Storyboard, episode director
- Ore wa Chokkaku (1991 TV series) – Episode director
- Yu Yu Hakusho: Ghost Files (1992 TV series) – Director
  - Yu Yu Hakusho: The Movie (1993 film) – Director
  - Yu Yu Hakusho the Movie: Poltergeist Report (1994 film) – Storyboard, supervision
- Ninku (1995 TV series) – Director
  - Ninku: The Movie (1995 film) – Director
- Midori no Makibaō (1996 TV series) – Director
- Flame of Recca (1997 TV series) – Director
- Trigun (1998 TV series) – Storyboard (ep. 15)
- Saber Marionette J to X (1998 TV series) – Storyboard (ep. 16)
- Hunter × Hunter (1998 film) – Director
- Chiisana Kyojin Microman (1999 TV series) – Series director
- Great Teacher Onizuka (1999 TV series) – Director
- Banner of the Stars (2000 TV series) – Storyboard (ep. 7)
- Ghost Stories (2000 TV series) – Director
- Super Gals! Kotobuki Ran (2001 TV series) – Storyboard (eps. 5, 8)
- Tokyo Mew Mew (2002 TV series) – Director
- Detective School Q (2003 TV series) – Director
- Bleach (2004 TV series) – Director
  - Bleach: Memories in the Rain (2004 special) – Director
  - Bleach: The Sealed Sword Frenzy (2005 special) – Director
  - Bleach: Memories of Nobody (2006 film) – Director
  - Bleach: The DiamondDust Rebellion (2007 film) – Director
  - Bleach: Fade to Black (2008 film) – Director
  - Bleach: Hell Verse (2010 film) – Director
- Magi: The Kingdom of Magic (2013 TV series) – Storyboard (ep. 19)
- Black Butler: Book of Circus (2014 TV series) – Director
  - Black Butler: Book of Murder (2014 OVA) – Director
  - Black Butler: Book of the Atlantic (2017 film) – Director
- The Heroic Legend of Arslan (2015 TV series) – Director
  - The Heroic Legend of Arslan: Dust Storm Dance (2016 TV series) – Director
- Divine Gate (2016 TV series) – Director
- Boruto (2017 TV series) – Chief director (eps. 1–104), animation supervisor (eps. 105–281, 287–293)
- The Seven Deadly Sins the Movie: Prisoners of the Sky (2018 film) – Chief director
- Kochoki: Wakaki Nobunaga (2019 TV series) – Director
- Arad Senki: The Wheel of Reversal (2020 TV series) – Director
- The Seven Deadly Sins: Grudge of Edinburgh (2022 TV series) – Chief director
- Ōoku: The Inner Chambers (2023 ONA series) – Director
- My New Boss Is Goofy (2023 TV series) – Director
- TsumaSho (2024 TV series) – Director
- From Far Away (2026 TV series) – Director
- Naruto × Ninku (scheduled TV series) – Director
