= Tite Kubo =

Japanese manga artist

Tite Kubo 久保 帯人
- Born: Noriaki Kubo (久保 宣章, Kubo Noriaki); June 26, 1977 (age 49) Fuchū, Japan
- Areas: Manga artist, character designer
- Notable works: Bleach
- Spouse: unknown (m. 2012)

Noriaki Kubo (Japanese: 久保 宣章, Hepburn: Kubo Noriaki; born June 26, 1977), known professionally as Tite Kubo (久保 帯人, Kubo Taito), is a Japanese manga artist and character designer. His manga series Bleach (2001–2016) had over 130 million copies in circulation as of 2022.

== Life and career ==
Kubo was born on June 26, 1977, in Hiroshima Prefecture, where his father worked as a town council member. In elementary school, he had already decided to become a manga artist, due to reading the manga Saint Seiya. His first one-shot was "Ultra Unholy Hearted Machine", written for the Weekly Shōnen Jump in 1996. He wrote his first manga Zombiepowder, which was also published in Weekly Shōnen Jump in 1999. It ran a short 27 chapters before being canceled in 2000. According to the author's commentary, Kubo was in a state of severe emotional trauma when he wrote it. Kubo later stated that he was not used to the magazine weekly serialization and used to pay more attention to his editor's comments rather than his own ideas.

His next series, Bleach, about Ichigo Kurosaki, a high school student who becomes a shinigami and fights creatures known as Hollows, began running in the same magazine in 2001. Kubo initially expected the series' serialization to continue no longer than five years. The original story concept was submitted to Weekly Shōnen Jump shortly after the cancellation of Zombiepowder, but was rejected. Akira Toriyama, creator of Dragon Ball, saw the story and wrote a letter of encouragement to Kubo. Bleach ran for 15 years of serialization and reached over 698 chapters from 2001 to 2016. Additionally, an anime adaptation of the series was broadcast in TV Tokyo for 8 years from 2004 to 2012, spanning over 366 episodes. The manga was named a winner of the Shogakukan Manga Award for its category in 2004. Kubo and Makoto Matsubara have co-authored two novelizations of the Bleach series, which were published by Shueisha under their Jump Books label. The first Bleach movie was released in Japan on December 16, 2006, followed by a second movie on December 22, 2007, a third on December 13, 2008, and a fourth on December 4, 2010. Kubo also appeared in the episode 112 of the Japanese radio program of Bleach B-Station. In that program, Kubo was interviewed by Masakazu Morita, voice actor of Ichigo Kurosaki, the main character of Bleach, and answered several questions from fans. On July 26, 2008, Kubo went to the United States for the first time and made an appearance at San Diego Comic-Con.

Kubo provided character designs for Madhouse's anime adaptations of Ango Sakaguchi's Sakura no Mori no Mankai no Shita and Ryūnosuke Akutagawa's The Spider's Thread and Hell Screen, which are parts of the Aoi Bungaku series. In 2018, Kubo returned to Weekly Shōnen Jump and published a one-shot, Burn the Witch, in commemoration of the magazine's 50th anniversary. Later on, in 2020, the one-shot was serialized in the magazine with a seasonal release schedule. The 4-chapter first season was published in August to September 2020. A second season of the series has been announced.

== Style ==
Both of Kubo's serialized works are shōnen manga with a heavy focus on action. His fight scenes are noted for swift cuts and dramatic angle changes between panels, as well as minimal inclusion of background art or splash pages. As a character designer, Kubo held to a distinctively angular and lanky style through Zombiepowder and the early portions of Bleach, which filled out somewhat as Bleach continued. His designs often incorporate elements of body horror.

== Influences ==
Kubo's earliest influence is from Shigeru Mizuki's manga Gegege no Kitaro. He remembers trying to sketch its characters and found his own designs to be simpler than that of Mizuki's. Bleach was first conceived from a desire on Kubo's part to draw shinigami in kimono, which formed the basis for the design of the Shinigami in the series, and conception of the character Rukia Kuchiki. Kubo has cited influences for elements of Bleach ranging from other manga series to music, foreign language, architecture, and film. He attributes his interest in drawing the supernatural and monsters to Shigeru Mizuki's GeGeGe no Kitaro and Bleach's focus on interesting weaponry and battle scenes to Masami Kurumada's Saint Seiya, both manga Kubo enjoyed as a boy. Kubo stated that Akira Toriyama's Dragon Ball taught him that all villains must be "strong, scary and cool" without exception, and added that to this day no fight scene has shocked him more than Trunks' first appearance. The action style and storytelling found in Bleach are inspired by cinema, though Kubo has not revealed any specific movie as being an influence for fight scenes. Kubo has also stated that he wishes to make Bleach an experience that can only be found by reading manga, and dismissed ideas of creating any live-action film adaptations of the series.

In the making of battle scenes, Kubo's comments that he imagines the fights with the empty backgrounds and then he tries to find the best angle to make it. Then, he tries to make the injuries look very realistic in order to make the readers feel the character's pain. Kubo mentions he sometimes is bored while illustrating them, so he tries to add a few jokes to make it more humorous. When creating characters, Kubo first attempts to create the design and later decide how the character's personality will be according to what he drew. Since creating them like this, Kubo considers every character to be unique and wants each of them to be developed along the series. When asked about romantic relationships between certain characters, Kubo answers saying that he does not want to turn the series into a love story since he thinks there are more exciting aspects concerning their personalities. While the Soul Reapers' attacks and arsenal have Japanese names, other characters from the series also use different languages to describe their terms: German words used for powers from the Quincy and English for the members of X-Cution. In the case of the Hollows and Arrancars, Kubo choose to use Spanish terms about their abilities as he is interested in the Spanish language for sounding "bewitching" and "mellow" from his perspective.

== Works ==
=== Series ===
Initially appearing in Weekly Shōnen Jump and published by Shueisha in Tokyo, Japan, the manga have been licensed in North America by Viz Media.

- Zombiepowder. (1999–2000, Weekly Shōnen Jump, Shueisha. Collected in 4 volumes)
- Bleach (2001–2016, Weekly Shōnen Jump, Shueisha. Collected in 74 volumes)
- Burn the Witch (2020–present, Weekly Shōnen Jump, Shueisha. Collected in 1 volume)

=== One-shots ===
Prior to being serially published, Tite Kubo wrote and illustrated several one-shot manga. Three of these were later published in English, included in Viz Media's collected volumes of Zombiepowder. These short manga display the rapid development of Kubo's artstyle in the mid-90s. Afterwards, Kubo published another one-shot after Bleach ended, with an artstyle that has been widely recognized as his own.

- Ultra Unholy Hearted Machine (1996, Weekly Shōnen Jump, Shueisha). Kubo's first published manga, his trademark angular designs are absent.
- Rune Master Urara (1996, Weekly Shōnen Jump, Shueisha). Has rough art and an in-between style.
- Bad Shield United (1997, Weekly Shōnen Jump, Shueisha). The character aesthetics that carried through Zombiepowder. and the early arcs of Bleach are in full evidence here.
- Burn the Witch (2018, Weekly Shōnen Jump, Shueisha). Kubo's one-shot after Bleach ended.
- Bleach: New Breathes From Hell (2021, Weekly Shōnen Jump, Shueisha). One-shot set after the events of Bleach.

==== Artbooks ====
- Bleach All Colour but the Black
- Bleach Official Bootleg
- Bleach JET

==== Databooks ====
- Bleach Official Character Book SOULs
- Bleach Official Anime Guide Book VIBEs
- Bleach Official Character Book 2 MASKED
- Bleach Official Character Book 3 UNMASKED
- Bleach 13 BLADEs.

==== Novels ====
- 2020: With Ryohgo Narita: Bleach: Can't Fear Your Own World, Vol. 1 (Novel), Viz publishing, ISBN 978-1-9747-1326-4
- 2020: With Ryohgo Narita: Bleach: Can't Fear Your Own World, Vol. 2 (Novel), Viz publishing, ISBN 978-1-9747-1327-1
- 2021: With Ryohgo Narita: Bleach: Can't Fear Your Own World, Vol. 3 (Novel), Viz publishing, ISBN 978-1-9747-1328-8

=== Video games ===
- Dragon Quest X (2015) – character and weapon designs
- Sakura Wars (2019) – character designs
