= Kentarō Itō =

Japanese voice actor and stage actor (born 1974)

- 伊藤 健太郎
- Born: January 3, 1974 (age 52); Hachiōji, Tokyo, Japan
- Other name: Itoken (イトケン)
- Occupations: Voice actor; stage actor
- Years active: 1995–present
- Agents: Mausu Promotion (voice acting); Theater Company K-Show (theater)
- Notable credit(s): Bleach as Renji Abarai; Naruto as Choji Akimichi; Yowamushi Pedal as Jin Tadokoro
- Height: 165 cm (5 ft 5 in)
- Children: 1
- Website: itoken-ju.jugem.jp

Kentarō Itō (伊藤 健太郎, Itō Kentarō; born January 3, 1974) is a Japanese voice actor and stage actor who was born in Hachiōji. He is currently affiliated with Mausu Promotion and is representative of Theater Company K-Show. He has taken over some of the roles held by the late Kazuyuki Sogabe and Takeshi Aono. His range is baritone.

== Biography ==
After graduating from Meijigakuin Higashimurayama High School, Itō had the opportunity to help out with a theater company that he knew, and became interested in the "world of performance" for the first time. In 1993, he entered the drama department of Toho Gakuen College of Drama and Music, and in the summer of the same year, he appeared on stage for the first time in Little Women. In 1995, he joined Theater Company 21st Century FOX led by Kaneta Kimotsuki, and at the same time, he sought a performance-related career and made his debut as a voice actor. 2001 to April 2009, he belonged to Haikyo, and from May 2009 to 2010, he belonged to Mediarte. He has been a member of Amuleto (formerly ARKRAY) since 2011, and then became a member of Mausu Promotion on June 1, 2016.

On September 11, 2026, it was announced that Itō would take an undetermined hiatus from acting in order to focus on rehabilitation therapy following a brain hemorrhage diagnosis requiring surgery.

== Filmography ==
=== Anime roles ===
- 16bit Sensation: Another Layer – Masaru Rokuda
- Altair: A Record of Battles – Alois Reuss
- Ai no Kusabi (remake) – Riki
- Air Master – Kitaeda Kinjiro
- Akuma no Riddle – Eisuke Inukai
- Baby Steps – Takayuki Okada
- Bakusō Kyōdai Let's & Go!! WGP – Brett Astaire
- Beelzebub – Hecadoth
- Big Windup! – Tomoya Takii
- Black Clover – Randall Luftair
- Blade of the Immortal – Shido Hishiyasu
- Bleach – Renji Abarai
- Blood+ – Akihiro Okamura
- Blue Exorcist – Shiratori/Astaroth
- Brynhildr in the Darkness – Kogorou Hashiratani
- Buso Renkin – Washio
- Captain Tsubasa: Road to Dream 2002 – Ken Wakashimazu
- Ceres, The Celestial Legend – Yūhi Aogiri
- Chou sei Kantai Sazer-X – Fire Shogun Blaird
- Cyborg 009 – Cyborg 0013
- D.Gray Man – Level 3 Akuma
- Dai-Guard – Shunsuke Akagi
- Demonbane – Daijuuji Kurou
- Dokkiri Doctor – Tamotsu Abe
- Digimon Adventure – Yukidarumon
- Digimon Frontier – Katsuharu
- Digimon Xros Wars – Fanglongmon
- Eden – E92
- Ergo Proxy – Pull
- Fire Force 2nd Season – Schop
- Flame of Recca – Minamio
- Forza! Hidemaru – Kaizer
- Fullmetal Alchemist – Barry the Chopper
- Giant Killing – Kazuki Kuroda
- Gilgamesh – Fujisaki Isamu
- Gintama – Sasaki Tetsunosuke
- Golden Kamuy – Yoshitake Shiraishi
- Great Teacher Onizuka – Punk
- Happiness! – Shinya Kamijyō
- Hikaru no Go – Tetsuo Kaga
- Ikoku Irokoi Romantan – Ranmaru Ōmi
- JoJo's Bizarre Adventure: Stardust Crusaders – N'Doul
- Junjo Romantica – Hiroki Kamijo
- King's Raid: Successors of the Will – Marduk
- Kōtetsu Sangokushi – Taishi Ci
- Kyou Kara Maoh! – Alford Markina
- Kiniro no Corda (a.k.a. La Corda D'Oro) – Ryoutaro Tsuchiura
- Kiniro no Corda Blue Sky – Yukihiro Yagisawa
- Kingdom – Kan Ki
- The Law of Ueki – Guitar
- Maju Sensen The Apocalypse – Shin'ichi Kuruma
- MÄR – Mr. Hook
- Martian Successor Nadesico and Martian Successor Nadesico: The Prince of Darkness – Jun Aoi
- Rockman EXE series – Shadowman
- Mirmo! – Ichirou, Hirai
- Momoko Kaeru no Utaga Ki Koeruyo – Kuroki Senjou
- Mobile Suit Gundam AGE – Zel Plant
- Naruto – Choji Akimichi
- Naruto: Shippuden – Choji Akimichi
- Needless – Momiji Teruyama
- Nurarihyon no Mago – Hakuzouzu
- One Piece – Fukaboshi
- Pokémon – Race Announcer, Mizuki, Seiji, Ghali, Norio, Tobio
- Papuwa – Kintaro
- Rental Magica – Hyodo
- Rurouni Kenshin: Kyoto Disturbance – Hōji Sadojima
- Ryusei no Rockman – War-Rock
- Saint Seiya: The Lost Canvas – Mandrake Fyodor
- Saint Seiya: Soul of Gold – Níðhöggr Fáfnir
- Saiunkoku Monogatari – Rou Ensei
- Seven Knights Revolution: Hero Successor – Spike
- Shenmue: The Animation – Charlie
- Super Doll★Licca-chan – Doll Isamu
- Strange Dawn – Shall
- Subete ga F ni Naru – Chikara Mizutani
- Superior Defender Gundam Force – Deathscythe
- The Too-Perfect Saint: Tossed Aside by My Fiancé and Sold to Another Kingdom – Georg Adenauer
- Q Transformer: Saranaru Ninkimono e no Michi – Skywarp
- The Wrong Way to Use Healing Magic – Tong
- Tokyo Ghoul – Banjou Kazuichi
- To Love-Ru – Hittakun
- Trotting Hamtaro – Taishō-kun (Boss)
- Yowamushi Pedal – Jin Tadokoro
- Yu-Gi-Oh! GX – Brron
- Zombie-Loan – Asou Sotetsu

=== Character themes ===
- Bleach Beat Collection – Renji Abarai
  - "Rosa Rubicundior, Lilio Candidior"
  - "Standing to Defend You"
  - "Gomi Tamemitai na Machi de Oretachi wa Deatta"
- Dynasty Warrior 8 Character Image Song ~Wei~ – Yue Jin
  - "THE FORERUNNER"

=== Drama CDs ===
- 1K Apartment no Koi (Naomichi Ootomo)
- Afuresou na Pool (Kizu Ryouji)
- Aijin Incubus (Tsukasa Mikuriya)
- Aigan Shonen (Kitamura)
- Akanai Tobira (Mori)
- Ai no Kusabi (2007–2010) (Riki)
- Bad Medicine -Infectious Teachers- (Yanagi Ryota)
- Bleach Volume 1: The Night Before the Execution (Renji Abarai)
- Bleach Volume 2: Hanatarou's Lost Item (Renji Abarai)
- Bleach Volume 3: The Night Before the Confusion (Renji Abarai)
- Boxer Wa Inu Ni Naru series 1: Boxer Wa Inu Ni Naru (Touru Hashiguchi)
- Boxer Wa Inu Ni Naru series 2: Doctor Wa Inu wo Kau (Touru Hashiguchi)
- Boxer Wa Inu Ni Naru series 3: Raibaru mo Inu wo Daku (Touru Hashiguchi)
- Dear (Kurenai)
- Junjou Romantica (Hiroki Kamijou)
- Hana-Kimi (Kayashima Taiki)
- Kageki series 5: Kageki ni Tengoku (Angel 2)
- Konna Joushi ni Damasarete 1 & 2 (Toshiya Aoyama)
- Mizu no Kioku (Kouta Sasaki)
- Muteki na Bokura series 1 (Shouichirou Kaga)
- Muteki na Bokura series 2: Oogami Datte Kowakunai (Shouichirou Kaga)
- Muteki na Bokura series 3: Shoubu wa Korekara! (Shouichirou Kaga)
- Muteki na Bokura series 4: Saikyou na Yatsura (Shouichirou Kaga)
- Muteki na Bokura series Side Story 1: Aitsu ni Muchuu (Shouichirou Kaga)
- Netsujou no Ori de Nemure (Morinaga)
- Ousama na Neko (Theta & Shirou Nabeshima)
- Oyaji Hiroimashita (Ryouji Saeki)
- Sakurazawa vs Hakuhou Series 2: Houkengo no Nayameru Kankei (Kyousuku Sonoda)
- Shiawase ni Shite Agemasu (Tokio Mouri)
- Solid Love (Taiyou Azuma)
- Soryamou Aideshou 1 & 2 (Kyou Akiba)

=== Video games ===
- Black Matrix – Zero
- Bleach: Blade Battlers – Renji Abarai
- Bleach: Blade Battlers 2 – Renji Abarai
- Bleach: Heat the Soul 2 – Renji Abarai
- Bleach: Heat the Soul 3 – Renji Abarai
- Bleach: Heat the Soul 4 – Renji Abarai
- Bleach: Shattered Blade – Renji Abarai
- Breath of Fire: Dragon Quarter – Bosch
- Captain Tsubasa Dream Team – Yuji Soga
- Daemon Bride – Asuma Shidou/Satan
- Dragon Force (PS2 remake) – Mikhal of Izumo
- Dragon Shadow Spell – Sig
- Dynasty Warriors 8 – Yue Jin
- Enchanted Arms – Ooka
- GioGio's Bizarre Adventure – Guido Mista
- Granblue Fantasy – Souval Vanguard (Event Side-Character)
- Hyperdimension Neptunia Mk2 – CFW Brave
- JoJo's Bizarre Adventure: Eyes of Heaven – N'Doul
- Kiniro no Corda series – Ryoutaro Tsuchiura, Yukihiro Yagisawa
- Last Escort 2: Shinya no Amai Toge - Naoya Ryuuzaki
- Mugen Souls – Vorgis
- Rockman X4 – X
- Star Ocean: The First Departure – Dorn Marto
- Street Fighter III 3rd Strike – Yun
- Super Street Fighter IV Arcade Edition – Yun
- Super Robot Wars series – Shunsuke Akagi, Kurou Daijuuji, Jun Aoi
- Tales of Phantasia (PlayStation remake) – Chester Barklight
- Togainu no Chi (PS2 remake) – Touya
- Ys: The Oath in Felghana (PSP port) – Chester Stoddart

=== PC games ===
- Clannad – Tomoya Okazaki (visual novel)
- Yuusha (You Can't Escape from the Heroine) – Maou Saga (Hentai Posing Battle Fantasy)

=== Tokusatsu ===
- Ninpuu Sentai Hurricanger – Excavation Ninja Mogudrago (ep. 4)
- Chousei Kantai Sazer-X – Fire General Blaird
- Engine Sentai Go-Onger – Savage Water Barbaric Machine Beast Manhole Banki (ep. 28)
- Uchu Sentai Kyuranger – Toome (ep. 7)
- Kamen Rider Heisei Generations Forever – Another Double

=== Dubbing roles ===
==== Live-action ====
- After Earth – Hesper Pilot (Sacha Dhawan)
- American Outlaws – Cole Younger (Scott Caan)
- Annapolis – McNally (Chi McBride)
- Ant-Man – Dave (Tip "T.I." Harris)
- Ant-Man and the Wasp – Dave (Tip "T.I." Harris)
- Back to the Future (2025 NTV edition) – Marvin Berry (Harry Waters Jr.)
- Below – Ensign Douglas Odell (Matthew Davis)
- Brooklyn 99 – Charles Boyle (Joe Lo Truglio)
- Cloud Atlas – Autua / Lester Rey / Duophysite (David Gyasi)
- Creed – "Pretty" Ricky Conlan (Anthony Bellew)
- Crimson Rivers II: Angels of the Apocalypse – Capitaine Reda (Benoît Magimel)
- The Devil's Double – Latif Yahia / Uday Hussein (Dominic Cooper)
- DodgeBall: A True Underdog Story – Justin Redman (Justin Long)
- Dracula Untold – Mehmed II (Dominic Cooper)
- The Duchess – Charles Grey, 2nd Earl Grey (Dominic Cooper)
- Eight Legged Freaks – Harlan Griffith (Doug E. Doug)
- Eragon – Murtagh (Garrett Hedlund)
- Exit Wounds – George Clark (Isaiah Washington)
- Final Destination (2002 TV Asahi edition) – Carter Horton (Kerr Smith)
- Flyboys – Eugene Skinner (Abdul Salis)
- Ghost Rider – Blackheart / Legion (Wes Bentley)
- Girl – Mathias Verhaeghen
- Grudge Match – Dante Slate Jr. (Kevin Hart)
- Guess Who – Simon Green (Ashton Kutcher)
- Half Past Dead – Nicolas "Nick" Frazier (Ja Rule)
- In Time (2025 BS10 Star Channel edition) – Borel (Johnny Galecki)
- Jumanji: Welcome to the Jungle – Franklin "Mouse" Finbar (Kevin Hart)
- Jumper – Griffin O'Connor (Jamie Bell)
- Let's Be Cops – Mossi Kasic (James D'Arcy)
- The Meg – Jack Morris (Rainn Wilson)
- The Rebound – Yael (Elliot Villar)
- Remember the Titans – Gerry Bertier (Ryan Hurst)
- Resident Evil: The Final Chapter – Christian (William Levy)
- The Rookie – Joaquin "Wack" Campos (Jay Hernandez)
- Rottweiler – Dante (William Miller)
- Scooby-Doo – Voodoo Maestro (Miguel A. Núñez Jr.)
- Setup – Sonny (50 Cent)
- Seven Pounds – Ben Thomas (Michael Ealy)
- A Star Is Born – George "Noodles" Stone (Dave Chappelle)
- Straight Outta Compton – Andre "Dr. Dre" Young (Corey Hawkins)
- Teenage Mutant Ninja Turtles – Leonardo
- Terminator 3: Rise of the Machines (2005 NTV edition) – Scott Mason (Mark Famiglietti)
- Tokyo Raiders – Pat Tai-yung (Ekin Cheng)
- True Detective (season 2) – Paul Woodrugh (Taylor Kitsch)
- A Walk to Remember – Landon Rollins Carter (Shane West)
- Wayward Pines – Sheriff Pope (Terrence Howard)
- We Are Marshall – Nate Ruffin (Anthony Mackie)
- You're Next – Felix Davison

==== Animation ====
- Epic – Mub
- My Little Pony: Friendship Is Magic – Rover
- Stanley – Harry the Dog
- Transformers Animated – Lugnut
