= Rock Musical Bleach =

Series of rock musicals

- Original Shinsei 2012 Rock Musical Bleach Reprise poster
- Music: Shoichi Tama
- Lyrics: Shoichi Tama
- Book: Takuya Hiramitsu
- Setting: Karakura Town, Soul Society
- Basis: Bleach by Tite Kubo
- Premiere: August 17, 2005
- Productions: 2005 Tokyo, Japan; 2006 Osaka, Japan; 2006 Tokyo, Japan; 2007 Tokyo, Japan; 2007 Hyōgo, Japan; 2008 Tokyo, Japan; 2010 Japanese tour 2011 Japanese tour 2012 Tokyo, Japan; 2016 Tokyo, Japan; 2016 Kyoto, Japan; 2024 Tokyo, Japan

Rock Musical Bleach (ロックミュージカル ブリーチ, Rokkumyūjikaru Burīchi), often referred as BuriMyu, are a series of rock musicals produced by Studio Pierrot and Nelke Planning. The musicals are based on Tite Kubo's manga Bleach. The Rock Musical Bleach consists of live performances that follow the manga plotline from the Soul Society arc and The Live Bankai shows with the original script. The first musical was directed by Takuya Hiramitsu, with a script adaptation by Naoshi Okumura. The music is completely original and was written by Shoichi Tama. The premiere was held in Space Zero Hall in Shinjuku, Tokyo from August 17–28, 2005.

== Synopsis ==
The story follows the life of high school student Ichigo Kurosaki after he obtains Soul Reaper powers from another Soul Reaper, Rukia Kuchiki. For transferring her Soul Reaper powers to a human, Rukia Kuchiki was sent back to the Soul Society and sentenced to death. In order to save Rukia from execution, Ichigo along with his friends goes to the enemy territory where he engages the members of Gotei 13, the main military force in the Soul Society.

== Productions ==
=== Rock Musical Bleach ===
The musical was first produced under the direction of Takuya Hiramitsu at Space Zero Hall in Shinjuku, Tokyo and opened officially on August 17, 2005. The script was adapted by Naoshi Okumura and music was originally produced by Shoichi Tama. The main role of Ichigo Kurosaki went to Tatsuya Isaka. The role of Rukia Kuchiki was played by Miki Satō. Rei Yoshii portrayed Orihime Inoue and Naofumi Yoshida played the role of Yasutora Sado. The show was performed until August 28, 2005.

=== Saien ===
The second musical was performed under name "Saien" and it was officially premiered at Meil Park Hall in Osaka on January 5, 2006. The Tokyo premiere of "Saien" was held at Nippon Seinenkan Great Hall on January 14, 2006. The production added the new cast member for the show, Eiki Kitamura to play a role of Izuru Kira.

=== The Dark of the Bleeding Moon ===
The third Rock Musical Bleach was opened at Miel Park Hall in Osaka under name "The Dark of the Bleeding Moon" on August 10, 2006. In Tokyo, the musical was held at Nippon Seinenkan Great Hall on August 16, 2006. The show added Kumiko Saito to portray Yoruichi Shihōin. The production also added Kohei Murakami to portray Hanatarō Yamada, Harumi Inoue to play Rangiku Matsumoto, Shogo Suzuki to play Kenpachi Zaraki, and Takuya Usui to play Ikkaku Madarame. Yousuke Ito, Rei Yoshii and Naofumi Yoshida were removed from the original cast member list.

=== No Clouds in the Blue Heavens ===
"No Clouds in the Blue Heavens" is a sequel of previous musical and it focuses on Rukia's execution. The performance was held at Nippon Seinenkan Great Hall in Tokyo on March 21, 2007, following the next premiere at Hyōgo Theater on April 3, 2007. The show features new cast members and new songs. Asuka Sekine, Hiroko Kasahara and Masahiro Kuranuki were added to the cast.

=== The All ===
The closing musical "The All" was held at Shinjuku Koma Theater on March 24, 2008. The show is the part of "Rock Musical Bleach DX" performance and it features the complete Soul Society arc storyline from Bleach manga along with the main actors.

=== The Live Bankai Show ===
"The Live Bankai Shows" are musicals with original script and they don't follow the manga plotline. The first "Live Bankai Show Code 001" was held at Aoyama Theater in Tokyo on January 10, 2007. The next one, "Code 002" was opened at Shinjuku Koma Theater on March 24, 2008, as a part of "Rock Musical Bleach DX" show. In 2010, the third show "Code 003", was performed across the country starting at Momochi Palace in Fukuoka, following the performance at Theater Brava in Osaka and closing show at Nippon Seinenkan Great Hall in Tokyo. The shows features new songs and new cast members. Naoya Gomoto was added to portray Shūhei Hisagi while Kengo Ohkuchi didn't perform his role of Sousuke Aizen in the third show.

=== Shinsei 2011 and 2012 ===
Celebrating the Bleach manga 10th anniversary a new production under name "Shinsei" was opened in July 2011. The tour ran nationwide in six different cities. The show featured a new set of cast members along with the new script and music. The leading role of Ichigo Kurosaki was portrayed by Norizuki Kouhei. Miki Satō reprised her role of Rukia Kuchiki.

The musical was reprised at Shinagawa Stellar Ball in Tokyo on August 9, 2012. The "Shinsei 2012" performance featured the original set of cast members with addition of Oyama Masashi who portrayed Urahara Kisuke.

=== Another Above Ground ===
Celebrating the 15th anniversary of Bleach, a new production of Rock Musical Bleach was revealed in May 2016. The play was based on "The All" which was held in 2008 and the story covered the "Soul Society" Arc from the series. The musical debuted in AiiA 2.5 Theater Tokyo and ran from July 28 until August 7, 2016, before continuing their run from August 24–28, 2016 at the Kyoto Gekijō. The play was directed and written by Tsutsumi Yasuyuki who previously worked on several One Piece projects.

=== Arrancar the Beginning ===
After about 8 years since the latest Bleach Rock Musical in 2016, a new adaptation was revealed in February of 2024. The play follows the beginning of the "Arrancar" Arc from the series, starting at the "Arrancar: The Arrival" Arc, and ending right before the "Arrancar: Decisive Battle of Karakura" Arc. It also includes a segment of "The Past" Arc (Turn Back the Pendulum). The musical debuted in Tennozu The Galaxy Theater in Tokyo and ran from May 12th until May 26th, with a continued run in Cool Japan Park Osaka WW Hall between May 31st and June 2nd. The play was written and directed by Akiko Kodama, featuring music by Shu Kanematsu.

== Musical numbers ==
Act I

- "Bleach" (Overture)
- "Kanarazu Mitsuke Dasu" – Ichigo, Orihime and Chad
- "Magakoro" – Orihime
- "Taisetsuna Koto" – Ichigo, Rukia and Renji
- "Mezameta Chikara" – Urahara
- "Chad's Song" – Chad and his grandfather
- "Orihime's Song" – Orihime
- "Taikyo" – Chad and Orihime
- "Chiisana Yasuragi" – Rukia
- "Zabimaru" – Ichigo and Rukia
- "Kanarazu Mitsuke Dasu ~ Owaranai Tatakai" – Ichigo and Rukia

Act II

- "Death Song" – Urahara
- "Kimi ga Mienai" - Hitsugaya
- "Soukonka" - Byakuya
- "Ai Tooku" - Aizen and Momo
- "Explosion" - Renji
- "Hallelujah! Goodbye! ~ Death Song Reprise"
- "Rukongai no Kioku" - Rukia and Renji
- "Shinjitsu no Yukue" - Ichimaru
- "Ugomeku Taishi" - Aizen
- "Okite Soshite Mayoi" - Rukia and Byakuya
- "Bleach Reprise" - Ichigo and Rukia
- "Aizen no Shi" - Momo and Hitsugaya
- "Taiketsu" - Ichigo and Renji
- "Tatakai ni Hitsuyouna Mono" - Urahara
- "Rukongai no Kioku Reprise" - Renji
- "Bleach Reprise" (Finale)
- "Owaranai Kimochi" - Ichigo, everyone

== Characters and cast members ==
The principal cast members from the original musical Rock Musical Bleach.

Character	Rock Musical Bleach	Saien	The Dark of the Bleeding Moon	The Live Bankai Show Code 001	No Clouds in the Blue Heavens	The All	The Live Bankai Show Code 002	The Live Bankai Show Code 003	Shinsei 2011	Shinsei 2012	Another Above Ground	Arrancar the Beginning
Ichigo Kurosaki	Tatsuya Isaka	Tatsuya Isaka	Tatsuya Isaka	Tatsuya Isaka	Tatsuya Isaka	Tatsuya Isaka	Tatsuya Isaka	Tatsuya Isaka	Norizuki Kouhei	Norizuki Kouhei	Akira Takano	Rui Kihara
Ichigo Kurosaki	The main protagonist of the story. Ichigo's life is changed when he obtains a Soul Reaper powers.											
Rukia Kuchiki	Miki Satō	Miki Satō	Miki Satō	Miki Satō	Miki Satō	Miki Satō	Miki Satō	Miki Satō	Miki Satō	Miki Satō	Chihiro Kai	Yuka Tano
Rukia Kuchiki	Friend of Ichigo Kurosaki. Rukia was sentenced to death because she gave her Soul Reaper powers to Ichigo.											
Orihime Inoue	Rei Yoshii	Rei Yoshii	N/A	N/A	N/A	N/A	N/A	N/A	N/A	N/A	N/A	Yuria Sato
Orihime Inoue	Friend of Ichigo and Sado. She is secretly in love with Ichigo and she goes to the Soul Society to help him to rescue Rukia.											
Yasutora Sado	Naofumi Yoshida	Naofumi Yoshida	N/A	N/A	N/A	N/A	N/A	N/A	N/A	N/A	N/A	Changhae
Yasutora Sado	Friend of Ichigo and Orihime. He goes to the Soul Society to help Ichigo in rescuing Rukia.											
Kisuke Urahara	Yousuke Ito	Yousuke Ito	N/A	N/A	N/A	N/A	N/A	N/A	N/A	Oyama Masashi	N/A	Masakatsu Nemoto
Kisuke Urahara	The candy store owner in Karakura Town. He helps Ichigo and his friends to get to the Soul Society.											
Gin Ichimaru	Yuichi Tsuchiya	Yuichi Tsuchiya	Yuichi Tsuchiya	Yuichi Tsuchiya	Yuichi Tsuchiya	Yuichi Tsuchiya	Yuichi Tsuchiya	Yuichi Tsuchiya	N/A	N/A	Kōsuke Asuma	Kentaro Akizawa
Gin Ichimaru	The captain of the 3rd division in Gotei 13 and the left hand of Sousuke Aizen.											
Sousuke Aizen	Kengo Ohkuchi	Kengo Ohkuchi	Kengo Ohkuchi	Kengo Ohkuchi	Kengo Ohkuchi	Kengo Ohkuchi	Kengo Ohkuchi	N/A	N/A	N/A	Ryōma Baba	Yuki Izawa
Sousuke Aizen	The main antagonist in the story and the captain of the 5th division. Aizen is the culprit behind Rukia's sentencing.											
Momo Hinamori	Kumiko Saitō	Kumiko Saitō	Kumiko Saitō	Kumiko Saitō	Kumiko Saitō	Kumiko Saitō	Kumiko Saitō	Kumiko Saitō	N/A	N/A	Karen Miyama	N/A
Momo Hinamori	The lieutenant of the 5th division under captain Sousuke Aizen and friend of Tōshirō Hitsugaya.											
Byakuya Kuchiki	Shūji Hayashi	Shūji Hayashi	Shūji Hayashi	Shūji Hayashi	Shūji Hayashi	Shūji Hayashi	Shūji Hayashi	Shūji Hayashi	Motohiro Oota	Motohiro Oota	Hiroki Ino	Kazuyoshi Yamamoto
Byakuya Kuchiki	The captain of the 6th division and Rukia's adoptive brother.											
Renji Abarai	Eiji Moriyama	Eiji Moriyama	Eiji Moriyama	Eiji Moriyama	Eiji Moriyama	Eiji Moriyama	Eiji Moriyama	Eiji Moriyama	Kujirai Kousuke	Kujirai Kousuke	Tsubasa Sakiyama	Yuya Uno
Renji Abarai	The lieutenant of the 6th division under captain Byakuya Kuchiki and friend of Rukia.											
Tōshirō Hitsugaya	Takashi Nagayama	Takashi Nagayama	Takashi Nagayama	Takashi Nagayama	Takashi Nagayama	Takashi Nagayama	Takashi Nagayama	Takashi Nagayama	Kido Yuuya	Kido Yuuya	Takato Nagata	Kenisuke Matsuoka
Tōshirō Hitsugaya	The captain of the 10th division and friend of Momo Hinamori.											
Rangiku Matsumoto	N/A	N/A	Harumi Inoue	N/A	N/A	Harumi Inoue	Harumi Inoue	Harumi Inoue	N/A	N/A	N/A	Mirei
Rangiku Matsumoto	The lieutenant of the 10th division under Tōshirō Hitsugaya.											
Kenpachi Zaraki	N/A	N/A	N/A	N/A	N/A	N/A	N/A	N/A	N/A	N/A	N/A	Yuki Okamoto
Kenpachi Zaraki	The captain of the 11th division of the Gotei 13.											
Ikkaku Madarame	N/A	N/A	N/A	N/A	N/A	N/A	N/A	N/A	N/A	N/A	N/A	Yusaku Kawasaki
Ikkaku Madarame	The lieutenant of the 11th division under Kenpachi Zaraki.											
Kaname Tosen	N/A	N/A	N/A	N/A	N/A	N/A	N/A	N/A	N/A	N/A	N/A	Kotaro Fujita
Kaname Tosen	Former captain of the 9th division before he joined Sousuke Aizen.											
Shinji Hirako	N/A	N/A	N/A	N/A	N/A	N/A	N/A	N/A	N/A	N/A	N/A	Shogo Yamazaki
Shinji Hirako	Former captain of the 5th division before being experimented on by Sousuke Aizen and turned into a Visored.											
Ulquiorra Cifer	N/A	N/A	N/A	N/A	N/A	N/A	N/A	N/A	N/A	N/A	N/A	Hyakuna Hiroki
Ulquiorra Cifer	The 4th ranked Espada serving Sousuke Aizen.											
Grimmjow Jeagerjaques	N/A	N/A	N/A	N/A	N/A	N/A	N/A	N/A	N/A	N/A	N/A	Takuya Uehara
Grimmjow Jeagerjaques	The 6th ranked Espada serving Sousuke Aizen.											

== Recordings ==
Aniplex has released three albums featuring songs from the musical Rock Musical Bleach.

- Rock Musical Bleach Live (2006)
- Rock Musical Bleach - The Dark Of the Bleeding Moon Live (2007)
- Rock Musical Bleach (2008)

== Reception ==
Rock Musical Bleach was seen by more than 130,000 people since its creation in 2005.

== See also ==
- Rock musical
- Theatre of Japan
