= Shūji Hayashi =

Japanese actor

Shūji Hayashi (林修司, Hayashi Shūji, born November 27, 1979, in Kyoto Prefecture) is a Japanese actor, known for portraying Byakuya Kuchiki in rock musical Bleach. His nickname is Osamu-chan.

== Musical ==
- Rock Musical BLEACH - Byakuya Kuchiki
- Rock Musical BLEACH Saien - Byakuya Kuchiki
- Rock Musical BLEACH The Dark of The Bleeding Moon - Byakuya Kuchiki
- Rock Musical BLEACH Live Bankai Show Code 001 - Byakuya Kuchiki
- Rock Musical BLEACH No Clouds in the Blue Heaven - Byakuya Kuchiki
- Rock Musical BLEACH Live Bankai Show Code 002- Byakuya Kuchiki
- Rock Musical BLEACH Live Bankai Show Code 003- Byakuya Kuchiki
- Rock Musical BLEACH The All - Byakuya Kuchiki
- Hanasakeru Seishounen: The Budding Beauty - Quinza
