= Genseishin Justirisers =

- Genre: Tokusatsu; Superhero fiction Action/Adventure; Kaiju; Romance; Sitcom
- Created by: Toho
- Written by: Kazuhiro Inaba; Tsutomu Kamishiro
- Directed by: Teruyoshi Ishii
- Starring: Tatsuya Isaka; Shiori Kanzaki; Junya Isaka; Hiromi Eguchi; Eri Ozawa; Kazuki Namioka
- Composer: Yasuharu Takanashi
- Country of origin: Japan
- No. of episodes: 51

Production
- Running time: 25 minutes (per episode)

Original release
- Network: TV Tokyo
- Release: October 2, 2004 – September 24, 2005

Related
- Chouseishin Gransazer; Chousei Kantai Sazer-X

Genseishin Justirisers (幻星神ジャスティライザー, Genseishin Jasutiraizā), lit. Phantom Star God Justirisers, is a tokusatsu superhero TV series produced by Toho and airing on TV Tokyo. This series is the second in Toho's Seishin (Star God) series. The show aired 51 episodes between October 2, 2004 and September 24, 2005.

== Justirisers ==
=== The Justirisers ===
The Justirisers are three chosen humans who are given the mysterious Justipower, the "Earth's will" that was discovered by the Riserseijin Noulan who utilized it to seal away Kaiser Hades long ago. Each of those powers is based on the Four Symbols of Chinese Origin. Each one is equipped with an In-Loader. Upon its activation, Justipower combines with a characteristic element within the user's body to generate the high-powered suit of armor that transforms them into a Justiriser. The transformation call is "Souchaku!" ("Equip!"). The In-Loader also acts as a communications device between the three Justirisers.

- Shouta Date / Riser Glen
  Shouta Date is a 2nd-year high-school student at Seitai High School. He is known to slack off from both schoolwork and kendo practice. He does not take most things as seriously as he should, and it does not really change throughout the series. Shouta, as is the first Justiriser to awaken on-screen upon facing the attack from the CyberKnights, and the first to summon GenSeiJuu Riseross. After becoming a Justiriser, he takes up the job of protecting humanity instantly, and begins to take his kendo practice more seriously… although not his schoolwork. He also happens to be a fan of boxing Champion Naoto Matsuzaka (Sazer Tawlon from the Gransazers) who helped him regain his own Justi Power and In Loader. Using Glen's In Loader, Shouta transforms into Riser Glen, the Justiriser that is formed by fusing with the 'Courage' element within his body and uses its power. His red-colored suit's design is based on the Samurai from Japan's Warring States Period with his helmet having the Phoenix Motif. Glen's Justi Power specializes in close-range combat and harnesses Flame Energy in his attacks, including his punching move "Blazing Knuckle" and his aerial-kicking move "Cross-Fire Kick". Riser Glen's main weapon is the Katana Blade "Glen Sword", which can be unsheathed for better offensive capability and can be re-sheathed to charge up his Justi Power of Fire for his signature finisher, "Raging Flame", which releases a destructive wave of blazing slashes from his sword. He later picks up a more powerful finisher, "Flash Blazer" which is a backhand slash that releases a single wave of extremely powerful blazing slash to counter more powerful enemies. Later in the series, Shouta also becomes the vessel for the power of Shirogane with the use of Mio's Justi Spark. As Riser Shirogane, Shouta seems to be in control but does not act up like he does, even as Riser Glen. He has feelings for Yuka. He worries a lot for her safety, sacrificing his Justi Power to save Yuka's life when Zora fatally wounded her. But it took Naoto's guidance and the Justi Crystal gathering energy that resonated with Shouta's courage (the Justipower that powers Glen) to completely restore Shouta's Justiriser powers. Shouta also happens to work as a part-time Dispatch Rider like Tenma Kuudo (Sazer Tarious in Gransazers) does. In the end of series, his marriage is shown with her.
- Yuka Sanada / Riser Kageri
  Yuka Sanada is also a 2nd-year Seitai High School Student like Shouta, and is the captain of the school’s Lacrosse team. Unlike Shouta, who is set in his path of protecting humanity, Yuka is much more conflicted. She would rather go back to being a regular schoolgirl, as her duties interfere more and more with her social life. But when confronted with danger, she does not hesitate to fight. Shouta was worried for her protection, which Yuka in the end shows that she can handle the dangers of being in harms way. She also has feelings for Shouta. Her awakening as a Justiriser came after a monster attack in which she tries to save a young girl from collapsing rubble in which the Justi Power of Wind created a barrier to protect both of them, and she was given her Kageri's In Loader in the process which she only used it after she saw Shouta becoming Riser Glen and decides to save him while he was attacked the second time. Using the In Loader, Yuka transforms into Riser Kageri, the Justiriser that is formed by fusing with the 'Virtue' element within her body and uses its power. Her marine-colored suit's design is based on the Japanese Kuno-ichi (Female Ninja) with her helmet bearing the Tiger Motif. Kageri's Justi Power utilizes powers of Wind in her Shinobi-style moves with High-Speed attacks being her specialty, allowing her to perform moves such as "Tornado Splash" that allows her to evade enemy attacks. Riser Kageri's main weapon is the cross-bow style weapon "Kageri Striker", which can be used either as a storage for her Kageri Daggers to throw against enemies, or activate its close-combat form "Claw Attacker" for close-quarters combat. Kageri's finisher "Phantom Crush", harnesses the charging of the Justi Power of Wind into the Kageri Striker to fire off a powerful energy arrow at the enemy. In the end of series, her marriage is shown with him.
- Shinya Hiraga / Riser Gant
  Shinya Hiraga is a 2nd-year College student in Kyonan University majoring in robotic engineering. Shinya is much more serious than either Shouta or Yuka, and although he uses his powers as to fight, the fighting troubles him. He does not believe in just fighting to protect humanity, and questions why they were given the power, and what for. It takes much for anyone to become friends with him, and earning his trust is hard. Sometimes his strong heroic sense of chivalry leads to protecting Mio since he has deep feelings for the guardian, lest he wants to protect her from any harm. Several females high school students called him "Shin-sama". A running gag in the series where Yuka's Lacrosse teammates; Rio Matsubara and Asami Segawa looking him. He decided running away from them, making his college friends teasing about it. His awakening traces back from the same incident as Yuka which he helped in the evacuation of those running away from the attack, but caught himself nearly crushed by the rubble caused in which the Justi Power of Thunder indwelled him and created a similar barrier that protected him. And he was given Gant's In Loader as a result. Using the In Loader, Shinya transforms into Riser Gant, the Justiriser that is formed by fusing with the 'Wisdom' element within his body and uses its power. The design of his black-colored suit's is based on the Japanese Yamabushi (Hermit Monks of the Shugendo Doctrine), with the helmet design having the Tortoise Motif. Gant's Justi Power harnesses Thunder energy and specializes in ranged combat. Riser Gant's main weapon is the twin-barreled shotgun "Gant Slugger" that works effectively in medium-to-long range shooting. The weapon can also be changed into another form called the "Gant Rifle" for longer-range precision shooting. As a shooting weapon, the Gant Slugger/Rifle expedites energy for its shooting moves and requires a re-holstering of the weapon to replenish the energy within the weapon for prolonged combat. The "Gant Slugger" can be powered-up to become the "Gant Buster" which activates two additional barrels at the centre of the weapon as well as the Target Anchor that locks onto the enemy, allowing Gant to perform this form's finisher "Varsus Cannon" that shoots out powerful lightning bolts from all its barrels to pulverize his enemy, while another of Gant's finisher "Thrust Shoot" can be performed with the "Gant Rifle" mode.
- Riser Shirogane
  The "Legendary Hero of the Azure Planet", Riser Shirogane is the physical manifestation of JustiPower sealed away within the Justi Crystal that Nolun gave to the Tendo Clan centuries ago. However, by combining the hearts of the three Justirisers, and the prayers of the Justi Crystal bearer, Glen becomes the vessel through which Shirogane comes into being. Becoming Shirogane grants Glen immense power that can easily defeat even the strongest enemy. It also changes Shouta's personality to a calmer and non-violent kind, contrasting the original to such an extent that he has on many occasions even spared an enemy or gave them a chance to retreat, only to be forced to kill them when they refuse. Becoming Shirogane caused shock to Shouta's body the first few times, but afterward he was able to transform without difficulty. However becoming Shirogane takes an even larger toll on Mio, and she is usually unconscious for some time after a battle in which he is summoned. Shirogane can summon forth the multi-mode weapon "Justi Arms" in combat. This powerful weapon has three modes that is reflective of the three Justirisers' Specialties: "JustiBlade" resembling Riser Glen's close-combat specialty; "JustiBlaster" resembling Riser Gant's ranged combat specialty; and "JustiLancer" resembling Riser Kageri's speed combat specialty. Its core power has the combined powers of all 3 Justirisers magnified by the JustiCrystal that Mio holds and lasts as long as she can maintain the unity within it. Its powerful finisher "JustiCrash" is also a resemblance of Riser Glen's "Raging Flame" finisher but with the combined powers of the three Justirisers' energy that is capable of taking out the most powerful of enemies. In the final battle, the fusion of Mio's Justi Crystal and Rigel's Riser Power gave birth to a new "Mirage Power" that allowed the three Justirisers as well as their GenSeiShin to fuse into one single entity in the form of a "Giant Riser Shirogane" to take on the Giant Kurogane Beast. This form and finisher is exactly the same one as the human-sized version, but scaled-up in magnitude and power as well as gaining the power to deflect attacks similar to that of Shirogane's GenSeiShin "Ryuuto".

== Genseishin ==
The Justirisers' mecha are stored within the Storage Satellite Shade Star, a spaceship Noulan created to support Earth. Though normally in Earth's orbit, the Shade Star enters Earth when Ryuto is invoked, during Daruga's attack on Riseross and the Seishinjuu, and finally fighting Kurogane before it is destroyed. 'Seishinjuu' translates to 'Star Beast', 'Genseishin' translates to 'Mystic Star God'

=== Genseijuu Riseross ===
- Height
  53.0 meters
- Width
  18.9 meters
- Weight
  6,500 tons
- Maximum Running Speed
  220 kilometers per hour
- Maximum Flying Speed
  Mach 3.0
- Maximum Horsepower
  20m BHP

Built by Noulan, Riseross is a giant dragon/Yellow Dragon dinosaur/Megalosaurus type robot that can be summoned by any of the three Justirisers, though it requires all three Justirisers to be in its cockpit to harness its full power. While the main Justiriser controls Riseross, the other two can summon and control their own Seishinjuu (Enoh, Kouki, Ranga) remotely from the cockpit of Riseross to support the main mecha.

It has many powerful weapons of its own, including: Zeross Cannon, destructive super-heated plasma missiles fired from its shoulder cannons; Zeross Flare, which involves firing an energy beam from its mouth; and Zeross Crusher, a pair of serrated wheels on its chest that can spin and slice into the enemy.

It is the base to which each of the specific Seishinjuu combine with, to form a more powerful robot called a Genseishin. The Riseross that was used by the Justirisers was the prototype unit that was destroyed near the end of the series, and Demon Knight went straight into the Shade Star to assist Nolan in rebuilding and activating the other 2 slightly weaker mass-production units in storage, allowing each of the Justirisers to pilot their own Genseishin modes by combining with the mass-produced Riserosses to repel the final enemies.

=== SeiShinJuu Enoh ===
- Length
  38.5 meters
- Width
  52.0 meters
- Height
  6.5 meters
- Weight
  3,200 tons
- Maximum Flying Speed
  Mach 5.5

Seishinjuu Enoh is the personal Seishinjuu of Riser Glen which he can summon through his In Loader, its main weapons include the Phoenix Vulcan that fires Mini Lasers from guns on its wings and Brave Crescent that fires blazing beams from its head. Its finisher is the Shining Slicer where it rams straight into the enemy with its wings basked in Plasma Energy.
Enoh's name means "Flame Phoenix" and is represented by Suzaku, and combines with Riseross to form Genseishin Ken Riser.

==== Genseishin Ken Riser ====
- Height
  51.0 meters
- Width
  28.0 meters
- Weight
  9,700 tons
- Maximum Running Speed
  270 kilometers per hour
- Maximum Horsepower
  40m BHP

Debuted in Episode 6 where Mio Tendo tells Riser Glen to summon his own Seishinjuu, Ken Riser is the combined form of Enoh and Riseross where Enoh forms the head and arms of the Ken Riser while Riseross forms the body and legs. In this form, Riser Glen becomes the main pilot within Riseross' cockpit, sitting between Gant at the right and Kageri at the left, same as the cockpit's original position.

Ken Riser is a close-combat specialized Genseishin with its twin Katana Swords "Yuuhouken Riser Saber". He can perform close-ranged moves such as Arm Blazer, a chopping move that is ignited with heat-infused plasma, and Riser Burn in which it can activate its shoulder emblems to create a flame tornado that burns giant enemies.

The Riser Sabers are used to perform two of its finishers: Its main finisher is the Mega Heat Slash, an extremely powerful attack which fuses both its Katanas into the single Brave Phoenix Sword that cleaves the enemies into two with Flame Energy, and Cross Fire-Burst which the Riser Sabers turn into long fiery whips and perform a highly destructive Flaming Cross-Slash on the enemy. Ken Riser has destroyed and annihilated more Kaijus than any other Genseishin, almost always with Mega Heat Slash.

=== Seishinjuu Kouki ===
- Length
  32.0 meters
- Width
  40.5 meters
- Height
  19.5 meters
- Weight
  5,400 tons
- Maximum Flying Speed
  Mach 2.8

Seishinjuu Kouki is the personal Seishinjuu of Riser Gant which he can summon through his In Loader. Kouki is a defensive type of Seishinjuu that possess powerful shell armor that can be used to deflect enemy beam fire. Its main attacks include Battle Shooter where its cannons fire Thunderbolt shots against enemies, 3-round missiles called Turtle Missiles from its front legs and Turtle Thunder which lightning bolts are fired from its shell.

Kouki's name means "Spark Turtle" and is represented by Genbu, and combines with Riseross to form Genseishin Juu Riser.

==== Genseishin Juu Riser ====
- Height
  43.0 meters
- Width
  35.0 meters
- Weight
  11,900 tons
- Maximum Running Speed
  150 kilometers per hour
- Maximum Horsepower
  55m BHP

Debuted in Episode 8 when giant Armor Gunner almost defeating Ken Riser in ranged combat, Shinya (Riser Gant) remembered that he can summon his own SeiShinJuu named Kouki to match the enemy's firepower. Juu Riser is the combined form of Kouki and Riseross where Kouki splits into two to form the legs and upper torso, while Riseross' body is turned upside down to form central body and its legs will become Juu Riser's arms, finishing it with Riseross' tail become Juu Riser's horn cannon. In this form, Riser Gant becomes the main pilot within Riseross' cockpit, sitting between Glen at the left and Kageri at the right.

Juu Riser is designed to be less mobile in movement, but is advantageous when defense and firepower is needed to take out giant enemies, in which this Genseishin has plenty of. As a mobile fortress type of Genseishin, it possesses a pair of shoulder cannons called "Riser Cannons" for artillery firing, the main weapon "Riser Buster" released from Juu Riser's horn cannon for heavier blasts, and a powerful pair of claws derived from Riseross' legs called Magna Grasper which can be used to deliver powerful slashes or perform a spinning slash. Its final attack, Thunder Burst delivers a deathblow to the enemies by firing both Riser Cannons and Riser Buster simultaneously.

=== Seishinjuu Ranga ===
- Length
  51.5 meters
- Width
  23.5 meters
- Height
  22.0 meters
- Weight
  4,200 tons
- Maximum Flight Speed
  Mach 2.0

A giant blue tiger, Seishinjuu Ranga (星神獣ランガ, Seishinjū Ranga) is the personal Seishinjuu of Riser Kageri which she can summon through her In Loader, this is an attacking type of Seishinjuu that possess powerful claws that can be used to attack its enemies. The main attacks include Slash Claw where its claws can be used to attack the enemies and Howling Burst which is a wave burst released from its mouth to weaken the enemies.

Ranga is represented by Byakko. It can be combined with Riseross to form Genseishin Nin Riser.

==== Genseishin Nin Riser ====
- Height
  51.0 meters
- Width
  28.0 meters
- Weight
  10,700 tons
- Maximum Running Speed
  300 kilometers per hour
- Maximum Horsepower
  40m BHP

Debuted in Episode 16 when the Justirisers had problems in dealing with giant Doctor Zora that overpowers both Ken Riser and Juu Riser by teleportation power. When Juu Riser seems to be defeated due to the mecha's movement limit, the blue-coloured tiger, Ranga appears and attacks giant Doctor Zora by its powerful claws, thus saves Juu Riser from being heavily damaged. Knowing that Ranga belongs to her, Yuka (Riser Kageri) takes the control from Shinya to form her Genseishin. Genseishin Nin Riser (幻星神ニンライザー, Genseishin Ninraizā) is the combined form of Ranga and Riseross, where Ranga splits into two to form the head, upper torso and arms, while Riseross turns its body so that Riseross' back will be Nin Riser's front body. In this form, Riser Kageri becomes the main pilot within Riseross' cockpit, sitting between Glen at the right and Gant at the left.

Nin Riser is advantageous in high-speed battles and can deal with the enemy in both closed and ranged combat. The Riser Striker, a pair of blades attached to its arms, being its main melee weapons and the Howling Burst being its primary ranged attack released from its mouth. Its final strike, Typhoon Slicer releases a massive cyclone attack from each shoulder, engulfing the enemy in a powerful typhoon before destroying it in one slash with Riser Striker.

=== Seishinjuu Ryuto ===
A winged, two-headed dragon that can be summoned by either Justiriser Shirogane or Demon Knight, Seishinjuu Ryuto (星神獣リュウト, Seishinjū Ryūto) is manifested from the Shade Star. It can combine with Riseross to form Genseishin Justi Kaiser (幻星神ジャスティカイザー, Genseishin Jasutikaizā), the ultimate Genseishin that is primarily piloted by Justiriser Shirogane and able to fire the Justi Nova. Its primary attack is Double Shock Buster, whereby each of Ryuto's dragon heads fire powerful bolts of golden lightning from their mouths. Ryuto is represented by Seiryuu.

==== Ultimate Genseishin JustiKaiser ====
Ultimate Genseishin JustiKaiser is the most powerful of the four Genseishin, and can fight very well in both close and ranged combat. JustiKaiser is the combined form of Ryuto and Riseross where the Ryuto's body splits into two to form the head, upper torso and legs while Riseross turns its body upside down to form the central body and Riseross' legs becoming JustiKaiser's arms (similarly to Juu Riser), finishing it with JustiKaiser's head emerges. It mainly relies on close combat, where its high-infinite strength along with its powerful clawed hands allow it to deflect seemingly unstoppable enemy attacks (such as when it easily deflected all of the drill projectiles of Megarion with just its claws) or gain the upper hand in battle (such as against a giant Kaiser Hades, where it easily shattered his massive sword). JustiKaiser are able to produce Justi Nova, a powerful attack containing multicolored energy released from its chest to destroy giant space beast in one hit even the strongest one, including Kaiser Hades in his giant form.

== Allies ==
Allies in Justirisers are their support and struggle to defend the earth from enemy invasion and mission to defeated all enemy in the story episodes.

- Mio Tendo (天堂澪, Tendō Mio)
  A young heiress to the Tendo estate, she inherited the Justi Crystal. Reika, her assistant and personal bodyguard, accompanies her, Mio leaves Hoshiyama Island to find the Justirisers and stays close to them at all times. When Shouta becomes Riser Shirogane, not only does the crystal drain him, but it also drains her life force to the point of exhaustion. Initially. she is depicted as the damsel in distress. However, she later act as groups' mentor, much to the crush of Kenta in one particular episode and her inexperience to domestic chores like cooking or baking cookies. In battle, she can hold her own, as she is an excellent archer. She falls in love with Shinya (Riser Gant).
- Reika Motomiya (本宮麗香, Motomiya Reika)
  She is Mio's "bodyguard" specializing in hand-to-hand combat. She can hold her own against Hades' monsters while the Risers fighting elsewhere. Much to some comical situations where she and Mio are under the Date household and assists in the appliance shop. She also arms herself with various kinds of batons, clubs, and truncheons. She values Mio as much as she can in protecting her and the duty that she is going to partake. She fell in love with Jinno after a period of time, eventually becoming a medium for the Riser Power.
- Demon Knight (デモンナイト, Demon Naito) (18-51)
  Originally the 450-old Riserian "Legendary Knight" Rigel, Noulan's younger brother. He possessed the Riser Stone. Being the last of his people after being forced to watch his planet's princess die, Demon Knight was taken under Hades' wing after his memory was wiped out, mentored by the Death Commander Danhauser. Donning the alias of Shiro Jinno (神野司郎, Jinno Shirō), he attempts to trick the Justirisers into thinking that he might be an ally, luring Mio into a trap in order to learn of the JustiPower and report his findings to Bacchus. But once exposed, Jinno battles the Justirisers in both human form and as Demon Knight. As the Justirisers grow as warriors, Demon Knight starts to harbor a rivalry against Glen after being defeated by him when the Justiriser achieved his full potential and causing him to lose his ability to change. After being saved by Danhauser, he manages to regain his ability to become Demon Knight at the cost of Danhauser being fatally wounded when he took an attack meant for Demon Knight. But before he died, Danhauser managed to give Jinno the truth behind his full potential yet to be revealed but unable to tell him of his true nature. It was only after Shouta saved him from Hades and then the appearance of Mira that Demon Knight's true nature is revealed, eventually joining the Justirisers as an ally against the Daruga Army. He takes his mission very seriously, so much so that he neglects his own well-being for the sake of accomplishing it. Eventually, he develops feelings for Reika, who later becomes associated with Riser Power. Jinno later loses the full capability of Riser Power to Daruga. Afterward, Jinno learns that Drake was the one who killed Riser Planet's princess, and kills him. During the final battle with Kurogane, Jinno adds his Riser Power to Mio's Justi power to give the Justirisers the energy to transform into Giant Shirogane to finish off Giant Kurogane. He bids farewell to Shouta, Yuka, Shinya, Mio and Reika as he pilots Ryuuto to go back to his home world. Demon Knight's weapon is the Knight Schwert, which is a sword which is heavily influenced by German design (Schwert=sword), bearing the Iron Cross near its hilt. His finishing move is the Knight Cleaver, which shoots a large energy ball. He later also has another finishing move, the Final Knight Cleaver, which shoots out energy swords all around Demon Knight.
- Gentaro Date (伊達 源太郎, Date Gentarō)
  Shouta's strict but kind and loving father. He owns an appliance center. Upon learning of his son as one of the Justirisers, he offers his aid to the team.
- Tohru Ichikawa (市川徹, Ichikawa Tōru)
  He is Shouta's best friend since they were children. In episode 40, Tohru has a nephew named Kazuya, who is emotionless since his older sister as well as Kazuya's mother were hospitalized. At the end of episode 40, Tohru surprised Kazuya smiling again.
- Rio Matsubara (松原理緒, Matsubara Rio)
  She is one of two of Yuka's Lacrosse teammates.
- Asami Segawa (瀬川麻美, Segawa Asami)
  She is one of two Yuka's Lacrosse teammates.
- Commander Kujo
  He is a JSDF official who blindly followed orders to attack the Justirisers until realizing something's not right after seeing protect the JSDF base first hand. He later investigates, and tests Shirakawa, his superior, by asking about his daughter, while implying that she was a boy by a form of address. Adorocs, not knowing that Shirakawa had a child, fell for the trick and failed to correct Kujo. Confirming that he and the others were used by Adorocs possessing their superior, Kujo helps the Justirisers by giving them back their In-Loaders. He again tricks Adorocs later by shooting an unloaded pistol at Shirakawa's body, forcing Adorocs to escape to no avail.

== Enemies ==
Enemies in Justirisers divided into two parts, they are: Kaiser Hades and Daruga Imperial Army who want to defeat Justirisers and (capture, invade and destroy) Earth, but all of them are eliminated in the story episodes.

=== Hades Army ===
Episode 01 - Episode 33

The Hades Army (ハデス軍, Hadesu Gundan) are the primary antagonists of the first series. Having devastated Planet Riser, the Hades Army turned its attention to Earth. It would only turn out that the Hades Army is actually a branch of the Daruga Imperial Army.

- Kaiser Hades (カイゼルハデス, Kaizeru Hadesu) (1-33)
  He is the series principal villain, a demonic figure armed with sword and shield whose goal is to become the ruler of the universe by destroying the only two planets whose power opposed him, Earth and Riser. 450 years ago, after wiping out the Riserians' Planet, Kaiser Hades and his fleet battle Noulan's Fleet in a battle for Earth that ends with him crash landing to the Earth during the time of the Feudal Era and sealed by Nolun herself within Kamishiro Mountain using the 7 Stellar Plates as key points to maintain the seal through constellation of Orion with the key-plate placed on Hades himself. By present day, Doctor Zora who eventually begins to destroy the Stellar Plates to undo the seal found in Hades. Though revived, the injury he received from Rise Glen forces Hades to leave in his battleship into subspace, summoning Bachuss and his Death Commandos to kill the Justirisers while sending Demon Knight to Earth. But once his plan to destroy Earth with the Magnesheldar and Sonic Crusher, Hades decides to kill the Justirisers personally to obtain their JustiPower and Demon Knight's RiserPower to become unstoppable. But when his plan is foiled during his fight against Shirogane, Hades enlarges into his true form. But Shadestar's appearance leads to Hades' demise by JustiKaiser. However, prior to his death, Hades sends his power to Daruga.
- Doctor Zora (ドクターゾラ, Dokutā Zora) (1-16, 42-43)
  She is a female fox-armored scientist who is devoted to freeing her master Kaiser Hades from his prison. Arriving at Earth and finding the resting place of Kaizer Hades in Kamishiro Mountain, she uses her Cyber Knights to attack Earth. But after the three Justirisers appeared, Zora personally attempts to kill the Justirisers, but was shattered by the team. However, Zora regenerates into a new stronger fighting form and begins going after the Stellar Plates to break the seal keeping Hades trapped. She personally battles the Justirisers when they search for the Seventh key Plate at Kamishiroyama, using her teleportation power to divide and conquer them. She almost kills them when Mio invoked her JustiPower in her crystal to drive Zora back. When the Justirisers flee the hidden base after encountering Hades, Zora attacks the Justirisers as she destroys the Stellar Plate. Though the Justirisers attempt to intervene, Zora shatters the key plate and frees Hades as she is wounded by then as they manage to turn the tables on her. However, as Hades' ship emerges from Kamishiro Mountain, Zora enlarges into a giant monster to keep Riseross from intercepting it. Though she over-powers Ken Riser and JuuRiser, Ranga's arrival turns the tables and NinRiser is formed as it kills Zora. Revived by Adorocs, Zora nearly killed Riser Kageri before going after Mio's Justi Crystal. However, she acts on her own to sake her own desire for revenge against her and the other Justi Risers. Weakened by a revived Riser Glen, Zora is killed for good by Kageri.
- Battle-Squad Captain General Bachuss (戦人隊長ジェネラルバッカス, Sennin Taichō Jeneraru Batsukasu) (17-30, 42-43)
  He is summoned by Kaiser Hades to fight the Justirisers with his Death-Commandos, armed with a sword he uses in his Vertical Divide attack. Being a warrior himself, he easily overpowered the Justirisers himself in his initial introduction, attempting to offer Gant the chance to join his army. After Twins Knight's defeat by Shirogane, Bachuss goes after the Justirisers to force them to bring out Shirogane. But they fail to invoke him, Bachuss decides to mercilessly attack the Justirisers in hope that Shirogane manifests using Gentarou as a hostage before Mio arrives and the JustiPower knocks him back to Hades. He later appears on Hoshikami Island to eliminate Mio and Yuka to ensure Shirogane would never be summoned. However, when Demon Knight forces him to aid him, Bachuss attempts to kill Demon Knight along with the Justirisers. Bachuss explains to Hades that he can handle the Justisers on his own, staking his life on it. After defeating Kageri, he is confronted by Demon Knight who fights him to pay back for the earlier attempt on his life. But Shouta's interference allows him to escape with Shouta thinking that Demon Knight wounding Yuka. He later uses Glen to take out Demon Knight before taking out the Justiriser. Kageri and Gant battle Bachuss until Shouta becomes Shirogane and kill Bachuss. Revived by Adorocs, he goes after Demon Knight's Riser Stone. However, he is forced to fall back by Glen and Kageri. However, he acts on his own to sake her own desire to kill Demon Knight. But Demon Knight kills him off when Demon Knight and Gant combine their signature attacks.

=== Cyber Knights ===
The Cyber Knights (サイバーナイト, Saibā Naito) are monsters used by Doctor Zora to attack the humans.

- Zaurus (ザウラス, Zaurasu) (1-2)
  A wolf-armored knight sent by Doctor Zora to begin the attack on Earth until he is confronted by Riser Glen. He is later sent after Shouta, he was killed by Riser Glen when the villain made the fight personal with his attempt on Sanada's life.
- Morgulis (モルギレス, Morugiresu) (3)
  He is sent by Doctor Zora to assassinate Shouta, able to shoot chains from his forearm that work with his super human-strength and teleportation. But the debut of Riser Kageri leads him wounded and forced to retreat. But after being upgraded by Zora so he can discharge electricity into his chains, Morgulis is sent after Yuka until Shouta forces him away from Asami and Rio. But though Morgulis overpowered the two Justirisers, Riser Gant arrives and blasts the Cyber Knight.
- Gildoross (ギルドロス, Girudorosu) (6)
  Based around the data Doctor Zora obtained on the Justirisers, Gildoross is sent after the Justirisers and able to counter their attacks. But though defeated by their combo, Gildoross enlarges into a giant monster that battles Riseross before emerging again. How Enoh's arrival allow the Justirisers to form Ken Riser.
- Armor Gunner (アーマーガンナー, Aamāgannā) (7-8)
  Sent to destroy the Stellar Plates in order to undo the seal, destroying the first one as a result in his giant robot form. While going after the second plate at Shimura Mountain, Armor Gunner engages Gant in a battle of marksmen as Glen attempts to protect the plate. But once the Justirisers gather, Armor Gunner retreats after he destroys the plate. After destroying the third plate in Mikazuki and losing to the Justirisers, Armor Gunner assumes his giant form while defeating Ken Riser with his firepower. However, Armor Gunner is destroyed by Ju Riser.
- Rhino Slave (ライノスレイブ, Rainosureibu) (9-10)
  Sent after the third Plate, Rhino Slave uses brute strength and can generate heat from his horn. He overpowers Riser Glen until Riser Gant and Riser Kageri arrive to support him, retreating before Riser Glen lands the deathblow. Rhinoslave later returns during the crisis at the coast of Ishihara, attacking Riser Glen. After destroying the plate while giving Nimeaya in the process, a furious Glen kills him.
- Zekard (ゼッカード, Zekkādo) (11)
  Sent after the fourth plate, he attacked Hiroyuki his power over wind and superspeed to get the plate. But before Zekard can destroy it, he is halted by Kageri who steals the plate. But after a long chase, Zekard nearly kills Yuka while Riser Glen comes to her aid. After Kageri and Gant defeat him.
- Guardius (ガーディアス, Gādiasu) (12, 28)
  Created to finish Zekard's mission, Guardius is actually the puppet of Deadler, used to find the fourth plate before withdrawing once he learns the plate is not on the Justirisers. Once destroying the fifth plate, Guardius battles the Justirisers until Buglian arrives to bring Riseross as Deadler reveals itself. Though it overpowered Ken Riser, Guardius is destroyed by Juu Riser.
- Raijimeus (ラジメウス, Rajimeusu) (13-14)
  Sent after the Stellar Plate the Justirisers possess, Rajimeus is hydrokinetic in his power to assume a liquid form. Glen and Kageri fight him when he attacks Gentaro who ended by the plate by mistake, creating water clones of himself as decoys before he escapes. Later using Gillmone as a cover to go after the sixth plate, Rajimeus battles Riser Glen when he intervenes. But Rajimeus manages to destroy the plate and withdraws, later returning to take the plate the Justirisers have. Once realizing the secret of Rajimeus' water clones, Riser Glen manages to kill him.
- Gundelon (ガンデロン, Ganderon) (14)
  A sniper sent after the Stellar Plate the Justirisers possess, he battles Gant to get it. However, when at a disadvantage, the other Justirisers arrive too late as the bag the plate was thought to be contained in is destroyed as Gant destroys Gundelon.

=== Death Commandos ===
Hades' elite bodyguards, the five Death Commandos (デストコマンド, Desuto Komando) serve under General Bachuss and assigned the task of killing the Justirisers for their master.

- Gillmond (ギルモンド, Girumondo) (17-18)
  The first of the Death Commandos to be sent to Earth and armed with the Double Saber with his trademark attack Death Cross Break, the arrogant Gillmond is assigned the task of snuffing out the Justirisers. Gillmond battles Riser Glen, leaving the fight after analyzing the Justiriser's attacks with the crystal on his forehead. By the time Gillmond returns, he uses Tooru to force Shouta to throw away his In-Loader to get some fun out of him. But Tooru manages to give Shouta his In-Loader as Riser Glen fights before the other Justiricers arrive to aid their teammate. But when Gillmond counter's Glen's Burning Flame, Gant fires at Gillmond, cracking his crystal and taking out his left eye. Now getting nervous, Gillmond battles Kageri and Gant at Hachimon Temple. Glen arrives in time and uses his nearly mastered Flash Blazer to kill Gillmond.
- Destalan (デスタラン, Desutaran) (19-20)
  A member of the elite guard, Destalan is sent after the Justirisers with his ability to fire his numbness-inducing Death Needles from his right forearm for his trademark Needles Scorn attack. Using the first fight to analyze their abilities, Destalan later attacks Glen while Leo Gigas is on the attack. But he attacked from behind by Riser Glen, forced to retreat to have his wounds treated. Once healed and made an attempt on Riser Gant's life, Destalan is given one last chance to kill the Justirisers by all means. As a result, Destalan attacks Shinya while he was seeing his parents. Making it personally as a result, Riser Gant battles Dantalan with Riser Glen and Riser Kageri supporting him. However, Bachuss arrives and cocoons Gant so Bachuss can take him out. But Gant uses his Versus Cannon to break out of the cocoon and kill Dantalan in the process.
- Basky (バスキ, Basuki) (23)
  A playful cat-like Death Commando armed with tonfa, Basky was sent to kill Riser Kageri due to being able move faster than her. After her attempt to kill Mio was stopped by Demon Knight, she was ordered to keep an eye on him by Bachuss to uncover the truth. When she attempted to kill Mio, Riser Gant intervened and battle he until Kageri arrives to settle the score. Managing to use Basky's speed against her, Kageri managed to land some hits on Basky before eventually awakening her full Justi Power to drive the Death Commando away. However, she is disintegrated by Hades for her failure.
- Twins Knight (ツインズナイト, Tuinsu Naito) (25)
  A tag team pair of shape-shifting brothers sent to kill the Justirisers after Demon Knight had not contacted Hades for a long time. The older Golden Brother uses the Brother Axe on his right arm and the younger Silver Brother uses the Brother Hammer on his left. Though the twins overpowered the Justirisers in the initial fight, an argument over which brother should have the final blow left them open to an attack. After Bachuss saves them, the Twins Knight brothers were ordered to discard their brotherly bonds to resume their attack on Gant as Riser Glen and Riser Kageri arrive to offer back up as the Twins Knight brothers Cross Change into their combined true form, able to execute their Double Spin Break. But Mio's interference allow Glen to awaken as Justiriser Shirogane, who offers Twins Knight a chance to walk away after displaying his power. However, the Death Commander faked admitting defeat and was easily killed when he attempted to kill Shirogane with his back turned.
- Danhauser (ダンハウザー, Danhausā) (27)
  An old comrade of Bachuss and Demon Knight's mentor, he is the last of the Death Commandos and is sent after the Justirisers before they can fully realize Shirogane's power. Appearing as Glen battled Jinno, Danhauser overpowers him as Shinya arrives. Taking Jinno with him, he attempts to reveal him his origin before Bachuss appears and tell his apprentice to uncover the part on himself to gain new power. Resuming his mission by starting with Glen and Kageri, Danhauser battles the two as Riser Gant arrives. But when Riser Glen finally becomes Justiriser Shirogane, Danhauser took the fatal blow meant for Demon Knight. In his dying breath, reveals to Demon Knight's power is sealed, but died before revealing Demon Knight's true identity.

=== Daruga Imperial Army ===
Episode 33 - Episode 51 (Final)

The Daruga Imperial Army (ダルガ帝国軍) are the antagonists of the last quarter of the series, the true force behind Riser's downfall.

- Majin Daruga (魔神ダルガ) (33-51)
  He is Kaiser Hades' older brother. Learning of Hades' death, he spearheads the Earth destruction back up plan while having his Rejandar forces hold the Justirises off until he arrives to Earth. When on Earth, Daruga overpowers Shirogane in their first battle before taking his leave. Using Megarion, Daruga battles Shirogane before sucking out the Riser Power from Demon Knight's body to become Dark Demon Kurogane (暗黒魔神クロガネ, Ankoku Mashin Kurogane), the counterpart of Shirogane. But managing to escape and seeing conquering the planet impossible, Kurogane summons the Diglos to Earth to wipe it out from the universe. Surviving the Diglos being destroyed, Kurogane destroys the Shadestar as he intends to turn Earth into the foundation of a new empire. Losing to the Justirisers, Kurogane enlarges into a new form as he proceeds to level the city before being destroyed by giant Shirogane.
- Commander Adorocs (コマンダー・アドロクス, Komandā Adorokusu) (34-45)
  The leader of the Rejandar forces, the vain Adorocs He is the vanguard who takes Hades' place in preparing Earth for his master's arrival, attempting to obtain the Justi Crystal and Riser Stone. Having the ability to recreate anyone if he has a genetic sample of them, Adorocs revives Bachuss and Doctor Zora after testing the limits of the Justirisers and Demon Knight. Given a final chance to get the Justi Crystal before Daruga comes to Earth, Adorocs possesses the body of JSDF Special Forces Director Shirakawa to use the JSDF to capture the Justirisers, Mio, and Reika while taking the Justi Crystal. But when Kujo learns the truth, Adoroc decides to have the military kill off the Jusirisers and company as they escape their cell. Tricked into leaving Shirakawa's body, Adorocs overwhelms the Justirisers and Demon Knight before Shirogane. But after Daruga severs his escape route, a fearful Adrorocs is forced to fight for his life until Shirogane destroys him.
- Combatants Zakoal (戦闘兵士ザコール, Sentō Zakōru)
  They are soldiers armed with Kanabou rods used by the Daruga Imperial Army and the Hadess Army. They were first used by Doctor Zora to support the Cyber Knights, then Bachuss and finally Adorocs. The henchmen of the two armies, they grow stronger and more disciplined as the series progresses, signified by their change in armor color. They are often involved in comedic situations when the Justirisers fight them.

=== Rejandars ===
The Legendars (レジェンダー) are the Daruga Army's elite super soldiers.

- Valgan (ヴァルガン) (34-35)
  A Legendar who uses a scythe that doubles as a rifle. He is sent after Mira before the Justirisers intervene before Adorocs spirits Valgan away. He later attempts to kill Mira when Demon Knight intervenes. Eventually, while trying to kill Demon Knight, Valgan ends up fighting Glen and Gant before the former becomes Shirogane and destroys Valgan.
- Gargoid (ガーゴイド) (36-37)
  A sorcerer who was "Master of the Absolute Thunder attack ". He was sent to capture Demon Knight and take his Riser Stone. Though Risers Glen and Kageri manage to drive him off, Gargoid succeeds in capturing Demon Knight before summoning Bahadorg to finish the Justirisers off. But when Bahadorg is the destroyed, Gargoid swears revenge as he is then sent after the Justi Crystal. However, the Justirisers manage to free Jinno with Mio's help. Gargoid attempts to leave in frustration, only to be easily killed by Glen.
- Gameleon (ギャメリオン, Gyamerion) (38-39)
  An excitable Legendar who can turn invisible and assume the appearance of others. Summoned by Adorocs, Gameleon is sent after Mio to take the Justi Crystal from her once Leogaias II sends the Justirisers to the other end of the universe. However, Demon Knight interferes as Gameleon is forced to retreat as the Justirisers return to Earth. Gameleon later returns in Jinno's form in a new scheme to trick the Justiriers and Demon Knight into killing each other. Once exposed, Gameleon dies from taking the combined final attacks of the Justirisers and Demon Knight.
- Armyul (アルミュール, Arumyuru) (40-41)
  A boar-armored Legendar with a sumo-fighting style who can turn into mist. Sent after the Justi Crystal, he takes it from Mio before it ends up in the possession of a boy named Kazuya. Armyul later finds him with Mio at the Asuru district, only to be stopped by the Justirisers before retreating after Glen manages to damage his armor. After getting his armor fixed an arm-scissors blade upgrade, Armyul is sent after Demon Knight when he came close to finding Adorocs' base of operations. Though he overpowers Gant and Demon Knight before Glen and Kageri arrive to even the odds, Armyul is weakened by Shirogane before he is destroyed by Demon Knight and Gant.
- Drake (ドレイク, Doreiku) (46-48)
  The strongest Legendar, able to materialize blades who killed Planet Riser's princess Maia in the past. He is sent by Daruga to force Demon Knight to use the full force of Riser Power with Megarion's support. After fulfilling his mission, Drake is sent to kill Mio to ensure Shirogane can no longer be evoked. However, fighting Demon Knight, he ends up being destroyed by him and the Justirisers.

==== Space Beasts ====
The Space Beasts (宇宙巨獣, Uchūkyojū) are giant monsters used by both villain groups to fight the Justirisers.

- Defrog (デフロッグ, Defurogu) (1-2)
  The first of Doctor Zora's monsters, it was sent to attack the city around the time the Justirisers are born. Though it overpowers the special defense forces, Defrog is no match for Riseross as it arrives on Earth as it is forced to retreat. But Defrog later returns to finisher off Glen after he defeats Zaurus, being destroyed by Riseross with Glen piloting it.
- Troidon (トロイドン, Turoidon) (10)
  This monster was sent to attack along the coast to bring the Justirisers out into the open while fighting the JSDF until Juu Riser is formed. But though it overpowered Juu Riser, the monster is killed by Ken Riser.
- Buglian (バグリアン) (11-12)
  A giant monster Zekard summons to aid him when he deals with the assembled Justiriser team. The Glen-piloted Riceross battles Buglian until the others enter and form Juu Riser. Once finding the weak point to be in the shoulders, Ken Riser is formed to finish it off. However, the monster is called back before the deathblow is executed. Buglian is later summoned to attack the Justirisers to get them to summon Riseross so it and Guadius. But Buglian is killed by Ken Riser.
- Gillmone (ギルモネ, Girumone) (13, 28)
  A giant monster sent by Rajimeus as a distraction to keep the Justirisers at bay while they arrive to fight it with Riceross. Forming Juu Riser, Gillmon overpowers the Genseishin until it separated to kill the monster with a pincer attack from both sides.
- Deathborg Leo Gaias (デストボーグ・レオガイアス, Desutobōgu Reogaiasu) (19, 38)
  This monster was sent by Destalan to attack a building Shinya and Mio were in, it battled Nin Riser. Leogaias can use its "Gravilight Ray" to telekinetically torture his opponent. Before it could finish Ninriser off with its Megalinum Shot, Gant managed to stop the monster. Enoh and Kouki arrive to support Nin Riser as it destroys Leo Gaias with its Typhoon Slicer attack. Leo Gaias is rebuilt by Adoroc as Leo Gaias II, given a Warp Cannon to teleport the Justirisers and Riseross off Earth so Gamleon can take the Justi Crystal without interference. The plan is foiled when the Shadestar retrieves Riseross as it returns to Earth with the three Gensei Beasts which disarm Legaias. Then Juu Riser is formed to finish Leo Gaias off.
- King Zero (キングゼロ, Kingu Zero) (22)
  A giant blue-bird monster, King Zero's trademark Death Storm attack produces strong winds can all it to counter the attacks of Ken Riser and Nin Riser, with the only Genseishin able to fight it being Juu Riser. Crashing near Tokyo Tower, King Zero begins its attack as Demon Knight holds Gant at bay so the monster can battle the other Justirisers in Ken Riser. After managing to drive Demon Knight away, Gant joins the battle and Juu Riser manages to overcome King Zero's barrier and destroys it with Thunder Burst while it attempted to escape.
- Deathborg Bulgaro (デストボーグ・ブルガリオ, Desutobōgu Burugaro) (24, 50, Seishin Crossover)
  A giant robotic ape built by Space Pirates, it was sent to Earth as part of Bachuss' plan to destroy Riseross by using its power to cause the Geishinjuu to malfunction and unable to summon the Seishinjuu. But once Glen destroys the source of the disruption, the Justirisers summon all three Seishinjuu to back up Riceross as it delivers the deathblow. During the final, an army of Bulgaros are sent to Earth before all being destroyed by the Genseishin
- Devoras (デボラス, Deborasu) (28)
  This monster is able to resurrect monsters and make them immune to any fatal attack, Devouras was sent to Earth to battle the Justirisers. While battling Riseross, Devoras revives Deadler and Gillmone as all three overpower Riseross and the Seishinjuu. But once Enoh blinds Devoras, Ken Riser destroys it to sends the revived monsters back into death.
- Scarabaeus (スカラベウス, Sukarabeusu) (29)
  A beetle-like monster sent to take out Mio and Yuka by causing a collapse with its impact on Hoshikami Island, it later emerges from underground to kill the Justirisers and Demon Knight under Bachuss' order. Paralysing Glen with its powered scales, Scaraberus overpowers Ken Riser. With Yuka's help, Shouta manages pilot Ken Riser and finish the monster off.
- Glaster (グラスター, Gurasutā) (31)
  A rock-skinned monster that arrives on Earth in the form of a meteor to protect the Magnesheldar before everything is ready for Earth's destruction, Glaster overpowers the Justirisers, turning Riseross into stones and sacrifices itself to petrify Riseross.
- Darkness Beast Bahadorg (暗黒巨獣バハドーグ, Ankokukyojū Bahadōgu) (36)
  This is the pet monster of Gargoid, summoned to finish the Justirisers. However, Bahadorg is destroyed by Justi Kaizer.
- Zarigan (ザリガン, Zarigan) (41)
  A giant monster created by Adorocs from fusing a multitude of crayfish into a single giant monster with an acid spray as its weapon. Zarigan overpowered the military before breaking down into its components due to a turtle caught in the mix. Once the fusion is perfected, Zarigan is deployed to attack Shirogane before Justi Kaizer is formed to break back up into its components.
- Egzerion (エグゼリオン, Eguzerigon) (44)
  A crystal-like monster, able to create clones of its mature form to fight for it, sent to Earth as part of Adorocs' final plan to destroy the Justirisers. Aided by the JSDF, Egerzion sneaks into the JSDF's Science and Technology center. Found out by Demon Knight, Egerzion emerges in its true form. With Enoh supporting it, Nin Riser manages to destroy Egerzion.
- Mecha Giant Beast Megarion (メカ怪獣メガリオン, Mekakaijū Megarion) (47, 49)
  A mole-like monster with drill ams, it is deployed by Daruga to destroy the city in a plan to depose of Riseross and its support mecha. Later deployed as Kurogane summons the Diglos, Megarion proceeds to destroy the city as Gant and Kageri try to stop it on their own before it attempts to kill Mio. However, Ryuto intervenes and Demon Knight arrives in the rebuilt Riseross. Once formed, Justi Kaiser destroys Megarion.

==== Battleships ====
The Battleships (バトルシップ, Batorushippu) (1-50) are space battleships used by enemy fleets.

=== Diglos ===
Diglos (戦闘要塞惑星ディグロス, Sentō yōsai Wakusei Digurosu) (49, 50) is Kurogane's Warship that fires Gigatron Cannon that tries to destroy an Earth. Diglos is the last of the enemy space warships. Diglos firing beams, Diglos overpowers Ryuto. However, Ken Riser stopped the Gigatron Cannon and destroyed Diglos in the final.

== Episode Guide ==
1. Appearance! Genseijuu Riseross (出現！幻星獣ライゼロス, Shutsugen! Genseijū Raizerosu)
2. Riser Glen, Kenzan! (ライザーグレン、見参！, Raizaa Guren, Kenzan!)
3. The Second Soldier. Kageri Sanjou! (第二の戦士 カゲリ参上！, Daini no Denshi. Kageri Sanjou!)
4. Friend or Foe!? The third man (敵か味方か!?第三の男, Kataki ka Mikata ka!? Daisan no Dan)
5. Three Heroes (三人の勇者, Sannin no Yuusha)
6. Kenzan! Genseishin Ken-Riser (見参！幻星神ケンライザー, Kenzan! Genseishin Ken Raizaa)
7. Crisis! The Hades Revival Plan (危機！ハデス復活計画, Kiki! Hadesu Fukkatsu Keikaku)
8. Sortie! Genseishin Juu-Riser (出撃！幻星神ジュウライザー, Shutsugeki! Genseishin Juu Raizaa)
9. Secret of Orion (オリオン座の秘密, Orionza no Himitsu)
10. Penetrating! Believing Hearts (貫け！信じあう心, Tsuranuke! Shinjiau Kokoro)
11. Yuka, Desperate Situation! (ユカ、絶体絶命！, Yuka, Zettaizetsumei!)
12. Attack! Two Large Monsters! (襲撃！二大怪獣！, Shūgeki! Ni Daikaijū!)
13. Gentarou's Critical Moment! (源太郎危機一髪！, Gentarou Kikiippatsu!)
14. Secret Plan! Deceit the Enemy! (秘策！ 敵を欺け！, Hisaku! Ada wo Gike!)
15. Miracle! Justi-Power (驚異！ジャスティパワー, Kyoui! JasutiPawaa)
16. Howling! Genseishin Nin-Riser (吠えろ！幻星神ニンライザー, hoero! Genseishin Ninraizā)
17. The Death-Commandos Attack! (デストコマンド襲来！, Desuto Komando Shūrai!)
18. Burning! Certain Kill Sword! (燃えろ！必殺剣！, Moero! Hissatsu Ken!)
19. Escape! The Strength to Live (脱出！生きる力, Dasshutsu! Ikiru ka)
20. Reminiscence, Those That Should Be Protected (追憶、守るべきもの, Tsuioku, Mamoru Beki Mono)
21. Dark-Knight, Demon Knight (暗黒騎士デモンナイト！, Ankoku-kishi Demon Naito)
22. Fierce fighting! Stand up Shinya (激闘！ 立ち上がれ真也, Gekitou! Tachiagare Shinya)
23. Everyone's Heart, Yuka's Heart (みんなの心、ユカの心, Minna no Kokoro, Yuka no Kokoro)
24. The Riseross Destruction Plan (ライゼロス破壊計画！, Raizerosu Hakai Keikaku)
25. Phantom Hero (まぼろしの勇者, maboroshi no yuusha)
26. Hero of the Azure Planet, Again... (蒼き星の勇者、再び…, Aokihoshi no Yuusha, Futatabi...)
27. Brave Riser Shirogane! (勇者ライザーシロガネ！, Yuusha Raizaa Shirogane!)
28. The Three Monsters Against the Genseishin (三大巨獣対幻星神, San Daikyojū tai Genseishin)
29. Decisive Battle! Hoshikami Island (決戦！星神島, Kessen! Hoshikamishima)
30. Bacchus vs. Demon Knight (バッカスVSデモンナイト, Batsukasu vs. Demon Naito)
31. Tremble with fear! Earth destructive plan (戦慄！地球壊滅計画, Senritsu! Chikyū Kaimetsu Keikaku)
32. Clash! Hero vs. Soldier (激突！ 勇者VS戦士, Gekitotsu! Yuusha vs. Senshi)
33. Ultimate Genseishin, Descent (究極幻星神、光臨！, Kyūkiyoku Genseishin, kourin)
34. Prelude to a new battle (新たなる戦いの序曲, Arata Naru Tatakai no Jokyoku)
35. Awake! Legendary Knight (覚醒！ 伝説の騎士, kakusei! Densetsu no Kishi)
36. Majin Daruga Appears (魔神ダルガ登場！, Majin Aruga Toujou)
37. Captured Demon Knight (捕らわれたデモンナイト, Torawareta Demon Naito)
38. The Tragedy of Planet Riser (悲劇のライザー星, Higeki no Raizaasei)
39. New Hero (新たな勇者, Arata na Yuusha)
40. Flight! Boy and Mio (逃避行！ 少年と澪, Touhikou! Shounen to Mio)
41. Beat It! Demon Beast Zarigan (倒せ！ 魔獣ザリガン, Taose! Majū Zarigan)
42. Showdown! The Three Commanders (対決！ 三大幹部, Taiketsu! Sandaikanbu)
43. The Supreme Hero (最高のヒーロー, Saikou no Hiiroo)
44. Justiriser Attack Command! (ジャスティライザー攻撃命令！, Jasutiraizaa kougeki meirei!)
45. Adorocs' Finale Operation, and Strategy (アドロクスの最終作戦と戦略, Adorokusu no Saishū Sakusen to Senryaku)
46. Unknown Changing Power (未知なる力, Michi Naru Chikara)
47. The Strongest Majin Appears! (最強の魔神登場！, Saikyou no Majin Tojou!)
48. Infiltration! Daruga Base! (潜入！ ダルガ基地, Sennyū! Daruga Kichi)
49. Resurrection! Genseishin (蘇れ！ 幻星神, Yomigaeri! Genseishin)
50. Attack on Earth begins! (地球総攻撃開始！, Chikyū Soukougeki Kaishi!)
51. The dream those begins tomorrow (明日から始まる夢, Ashita kara Hajimaru Yume)

== Songs ==
Opening theme

"Genseishin Justirisers" (幻星神 ジャスティライザー, Genseishin Jasutiraizā)

  - Lyrics
    Kenji Kojima (Dual Dream)
  - Composition
    Kenji Kojima (Dual Dream)
  - Arrangement
    Takehito Shimizu
  - Artist
    Mitsuo Nakajima

Ending themes

- "Sky"
  - Lyrics
    rom△ntic high
  - Composition
    monk
  - Arrangement
    monk
  - Chorus Arrangement
    Yas Kitajima
  - Artist
    SweetS
- "Rettō Party Knight" (列島パーティ騎士（ナイト）, Rettō Pāti Naito)
  - Lyrics
    HAV
  - Composition
    HAV
  - Arrangement
    HAV
  - Performance
    HAV
- "Kotoba ni Dekinai Omoi" (コトバにできない想い; "Thinking that Cannot be put in Words")
  - Lyrics
    MIZUE
  - Composition
    Water
  - Arrangement
    Takaomi Kondo
  - Artist
    Water

Insert songs

- "Mittsu no Chikara" (3つのチカラ; "Three Powers")
  - Lyrics
    Koji Kojima
  - Composition
    Koji Kojima
  - Performance
    Koji Kojima
  - Arrangement
    Takehito Shimizu
- "Justipower ~Seigi no Tsurugi~" (ジャスティパワー ～正義の剣～, Jasutipawā ~Seigi no Tsurugi~; Justipower ~Sword of Justice~)
  - Lyrics
    Mitsuo Nakajima
  - Composition
    Mitsuo Nakajima
  - Performance
    Mitsuo Nakajima

== Cast ==
- Shouta Date / Riser Glen / Riser Shirogane
  Isaka Tatsuya (伊阪達也)
- Yuka Sanada / Riser Kageri
  Kanzaki Shiori (神崎詩織)
- Shinya Hiraga / Riser Gant
  Isaka Shunya (井坂俊哉)
- Mio Tendo
  Hiromi Eguchi (江口ヒロミ)
- Reika Motomiya
  Eri Ozawa (小澤栄里)
- Shiro Jinno / Demon Knight
  Kazuki Namioka (波岡 一喜)
- Genjuro Date
  Yūji Nakamura (中村有志)
- Tohru Ichikawa
  Akira Uchida (内田明)
- Ryuki Takeda
  Yoshikazu Kotani (小谷 嘉一)
- Rio Matsubara
  Mariko Masahiko
- Asami Segawa
  Ayano Torī
- Commander Kujo
  Masanori Tomita

== Voice Actors ==
- Majin Daruga / Majin Kurogane
  Dai Matsumoto
- Kaiser Hades
  Takashi Taniguchi
- Doctor Zora
  Rei Igarashi
- General Bachuss
  Atsushi Ono
- Commander Adorocs
  Kōichi Tōchika
- Legendar Drake
  Ryuta Izumi

=== Guest stars ===
- Akira Dentsuin / Sazer-Remls
  Hideaki Serizawa (Episode 30)
- Mika Shidou / Sazer-Mithras
  Asuka Shimizu (Episode 35)
- Tappei Mikami / Sazer-Gans
  Takuma Sugawara (Episode 27)
- Naoto Matsuzaka / Sazer-Tawlon
  Tomohide Takahara (Episodes 42-43)

== Video game ==
An action game developed by WinkySoft and published by Konami was released on December 23, 2004 for the Game Boy Advance.

Preceded by Chouseishin Gransazer	Chouseishin Series; 2004 – 2005	Succeeded by Chousei Kantai Sazer-X
