= Catalogue Victor→Mercury 87–99 =

Compilation album by Buck-Tick
- Released: March 7, 2012
- Label: Victor Entertainment
- Producer: Buck-Tick

Buck-Tick chronology
Razzle Dazzle (2010)	Catalogue Victor→Mercury 87–99 (2012)	Catalogue Ariola 00–10 (2012)

Catalogue Victor→Mercury 87–99 is the seventh compilation album by Buck-Tick, released on March 7, 2012. It compiles all of their singles released while signed to Victor Entertainment, from 1988's "Just One More Kiss" to 1999's "Miu". It and Catalogue Ariola 00–10 were released on the same day in celebration of Buck-Tick's 25th anniversary.

The regular edition also contained a DVD of each song's music video. A limited-edition version contained two additional CDs, with track lists decided by fans voting on their special 25th anniversary website, the DVD, with additional material from several televised live performances throughout 1987–1993, and a 100-page photobook. The album reached number eleven on the Oricon chart.

== Track listing ==
=== Disc 1 ===
1. "Just One More Kiss"
2. "Aku no Hana"
3. "Speed"
4. "M・A・D"
5. "Jupiter"
6. "Dress"
7. "Die"
8. "Uta"
9. "Kodou"
10. "Mienai Mono o Miyo to Suru Gokai Subete Gokai da"
11. "Candy"
12. "Heroine"
13. "Sasayaki"
14. "Gessekai"
15. "Bran-New Lover"
16. "Miu"

=== Limited edition Disc 2 ===
- These are the songs that were ranked 30 through 16 by the fans.
1. "Romanesque"
2. "Moon Light" (Koroshi no Shirabe: This Is Not Greatest Hits version)
3. "Sexual XXXXX!"
4. "Iconoclasm" (Koroshi no Shirabe: This Is Not Greatest Hits version)
5. "Hurry Up Mode" (Hurry Up Mode (1990 Mix) version)
6. "Kamikaze"
7. "Physical Neurose"
8. "Machine"
9. "Kick (Daichi wo Keru Otoko)"
10. "Muchi no Namida"
11. "...In Heaven..."
12. "Love Me"
13. "Iconoclasm"
14. "Moon Light" (Hurry Up Mode (1990 Mix) version)
15. "Oriental Love Story" (Koroshi no Shirabe: This Is Not Greatest Hits version)

=== Limited edition Disc 3 ===
- These are the songs that were ranked 15 through 1 by the fans.
1. "Taiyou ni Korosareta"
2. "Kimi ga Shin... Dara"
3. "Sakura"
4. "My Funny Valentine"
5. "Idol"
6. "Love Letter"
7. "Fly High" (Hurry Up Mode (1990 Mix) version)
8. "Angelic Conversation"
9. "D-T-D"
10. "Misshitsu"
11. "Kiss Me Good-Bye"
12. "My Fuckin' Valentine"
13. "Ash-ra"
14. "National Media Boys"
15. "My Eyes & Your Eyes"

=== Limited edition DVD ===
- This is the additional content only on the limited edition's DVD (starting with track 17 as the first 16 are the music videos for disc 1's songs).
1. "Sexual XXXXX!" (1987)
2. "Future for Future" (1987 Japan Youth Hall)
3. "Empty Girl" (1988 Shibuya Public Hall
4. "...In Heaven..." (1988 Yomiuri Land East)
5. "Hyper Love" (1988 Shinjuku Koma Theater)
6. "Tokyo" (1989 Tokyo Dome)
7. "Romanesque" (1989 Tokyo Dome)
8. "The World is Yours" (1990 Kawasaki Club Citta)
9. "Victims of Love" (1991 JSB Satellite Circuit)
10. "Speed" (1991 JSB Satellite Circuit)
11. "Sakura" (1991 JSB Satellite Circuit)
12. "Aku no Hana" (1991 Shibuya Club Quattro)
13. "My Funny Valentine" (1991 Shibuya Club Quattro)
14. "Iconoclasm" (1992 Yokohama Arena)
15. "M・A・D" (1992 Yokohama Arena)
16. "Kirameki no Naka de..." (1993 Shibuya Public Hall)
