= Tatsuya Isaka =

Japanese actor (born 1985)

Tatsuya Isaka (伊阪 達也, Isaka Tatsuya; born July 12, 1985, in Ishikawa Prefecture) is a Japanese actor. He played Ichigo Kurosaki in the rock musical Bleach.

== Television dramas ==
- Gokusen (2002) (Guest star)
- Water Boys (2003)
- Genseishin Justiriser (2004–2005)
- Tumbling (Film) (2010)

== Stage ==
- Rock Musical Bleach - Ichigo Kurosaki
