= Catalogue Ariola 00–10 =

Compilation album by Buck-Tick
- Released: 7 March 2012
- Label: Ariola Japan
- Producer: Buck-Tick

Buck-Tick chronology
Catalogue Victor→Mercury 87–99 (2012)	Catalogue Ariola 00–10 (2012)	Yume Miru Uchuu (2012)

Catalogue Ariola 00–10 is the eighth compilation album by Buck-Tick, released on 7 March 2012. It compiles all of their singles released while signed to BMG/Funhouse and Ariola Japan, from 2000's "Glamorous" to 2010's "Kuchizuke". It and Catalogue Victor→Mercury 87–99 were released on the same day in celebration of Buck-Tick's 25th anniversary.

The regular edition also contained a DVD of each song's music video. A limited-edition version contained a new re-recording of "Machine", two additional CDs, with track lists decided by fans voting on their special 25th anniversary website, the DVD, with additional material from several of their yearly televised Day in Question concerts throughout 2001–2009, and a 100-page photobook. The album reached number ten on the Oricon chart.

== Track listing ==
=== Disc 1 ===
1. "Glamorous"
2. "21st Cherry Boy"
3. "Kyokutou Yori Ai wo Komete"
4. "Zangai"
5. "Gensou no Hana"
6. "Romance"
7. "Kagerou"
8. "Rendezvous"
9. "Alice in Wonder Underground"
10. "Heaven"
11. "Galaxy"
12. "Dokudanjou Beauty"
13. "Kuchizuke"
14. "Machine -Remodel-" (new re-recording, limited edition only)

=== Limited edition Disc 2 ===
- These are the songs that were ranked 1 through 15 by the fans.
1. "Shippuu no Blade Runner"
2. "Flame"
3. "Hamushi no Yō ni"
4. "Muma - The Nightmare"
5. "Snow White"
6. "Long Distance Call"
7. "Shanikusai -Carnival-"
8. "Gekka Reijin"
9. "Coyote"
10. "Baby, I Want You"
11. "Tenshi wa Dare da"
12. "Memento Mori"
13. "Rhapsody"
14. "Django!!! -Genwaku no Django-"
15. "Cyborg Dolly: Sora-mimi: Phantom"

=== Limited edition Disc 3 ===
- These are the songs that were ranked 16 through 30 by the fans.
1. "Revolver"
2. "Rain"
3. "Bolero"
4. "Megami"
5. "Serenade -Itoshi no Umbrella-Sweety-"
6. "Nakayubi"
7. "Alive"
8. "Sid Vicious on the Beach"
9. "Girl -Shape2-"
10. "Zekkai"
11. "Warp Day"
12. "Limbo"
13. "Mona Lisa"
14. "Umbrella"
15. "Diabolo -Lucifer-"

=== Limited edition DVD ===
- This is the additional content only on the limited edition's DVD (starting with track 14 as the first 13 are the music videos for disc 1's songs).
1. "Iconoclasm" (2001.12.29 Day in Question)
2. "National Media Boys" (2001.12.29 Day in Question)
3. "Sexual XXXXX!" (2002.12.29 Day in Question)
4. "Kamikaze" (2003.12.28 Day in Question)
5. "Rhapsody" (2003.12.28 Day in Question)
6. "My Eyes & Your Eyes" (2003.12.28 Day in Question)
7. "Paradise" (2003.12.29 Day in Question)
8. "Empty Girl" (2003.12.29 Day in Question)
9. "Tight Rope" (2004.12.29 Day in Question)
10. "Aku no Hana" (2004.12.29 Day in Question)
11. "Brain, Whisper, Head, Hate is Noise" (2005.12.29 Day in Question)
12. "Passion" (2005.12.29 Day in Question)
13. "Kyokutou Yori Ai wo Komete" (2006.12.29 Day in Question)
14. "Sakura" (2006.12.29 Day in Question)
15. "Alice in Wonder Underground" (2008.12.29 Day in Question)
16. "Memento Mori" (2009.12.29 Day in Question)
17. "Snow White" (2009.12.29 Day in Question)
18. "Misty Zone" (2009.12.29 Day in Question)
