= Yosuke Ito =

Japanese actor and singer

- 伊藤 陽佑
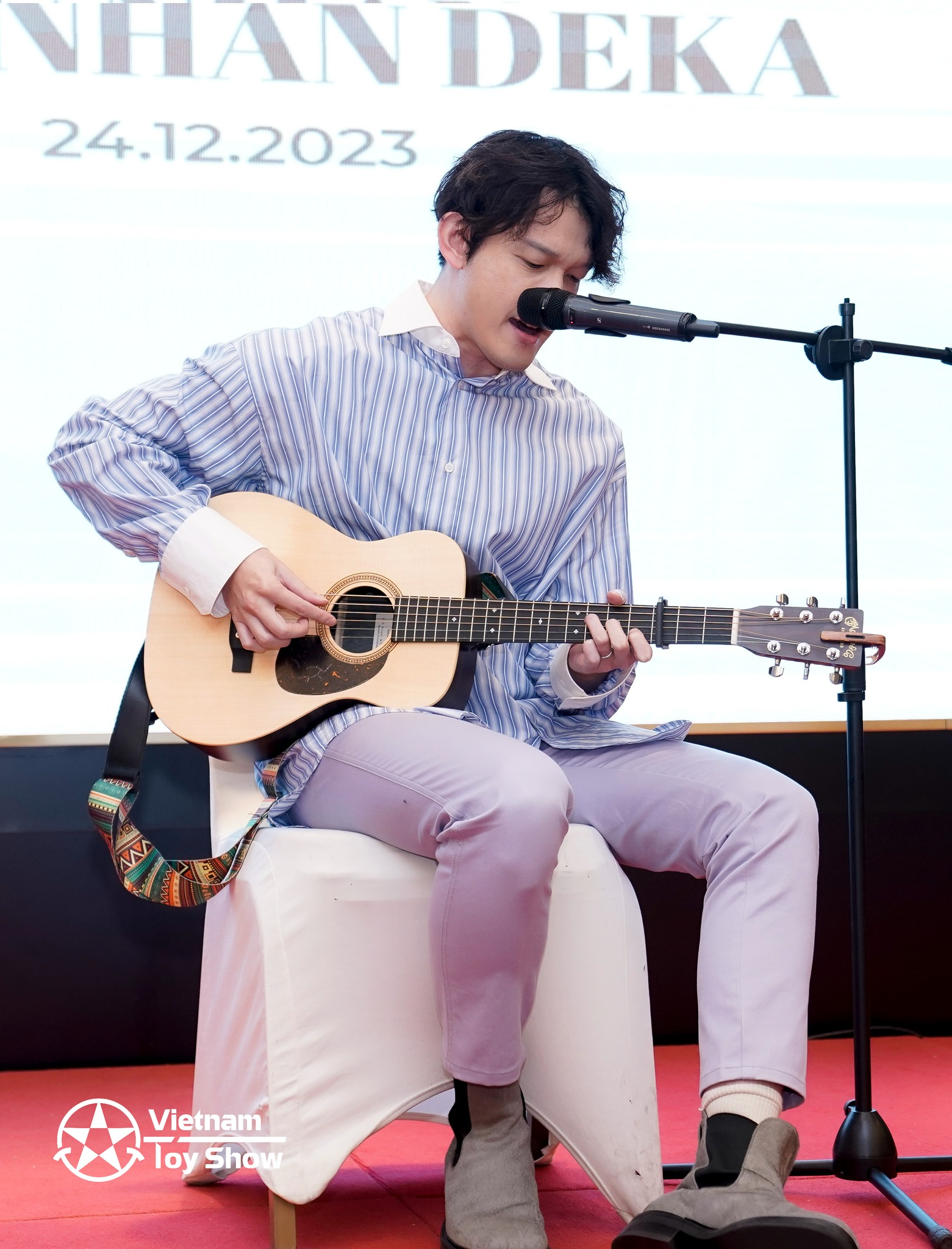
- Ito Yosuke at the Fanmeeting event of Vietnam Toy Show on December 24, 2023
- Born: July 7, 1984 (age 41); Sapporo, Hokkaido, Japan
- Occupation: actor
- Years active: 2004–present
- Known for: Senichi "Sen-chan" Enari/Deka Green
- Height: 184 cm (6 ft 0 in)

Yosuke Ito (伊藤 陽佑, Itō Yōsuke; born July 7, 1984 in Sapporo, Hokkaidō, Japan), also known as Lito, is a Japanese actor and singer. He is best known for his role as Senichi "Sen-chan" Enari/Deka Green in the 2004 TV series Tokusou Sentai Dekaranger. Itou is affiliated with Actoli Llc.

== Filmography ==
=== TV dramas ===
- Tokusou Sentai Dekaranger (2004–2005) – Senichi Enari/Deka Green
- Tensou Sentai Goseiger Epic 10 (2010) – Magis/Gosei Green
- Zyuden Sentai Kyoryuger Brave 27 (2013) – Debo Shi nobi nba (Voice) (ep. 27)
- Uchu Sentai Kyuranger Space 18 (2017) – Senichi Enari

=== Films ===
- Tokusou Sentai Dekaranger The Movie: Full Blast Action (2004) – Senichi Enari/Deka Green
- Kashima-C (2006) – Takebe
- The Setting Sun (2009) – Naoji
- Gangsta (2011) – Shirosasori
- Bolero (2012)
- Shinrei Shashinbu Gekijōban (2014) – Kaname Makimura

=== Direct-to-video ===
- Tokusou Sentai Dekaranger Super Video: Super Finisher Match! Deka Red vs. Deka Break (2004) – Senichi Enari/Deka Green
- Tokusou Sentai Dekaranger vs. Abaranger (2005) – Senichi Enari/Deka Green
- Mahou Sentai Magiranger vs. Dekaranger (2006) – Senichi Enari/Deka Green
- Shinrei Shashinbu (2010) – Kaname Makimura
- Tokusou Sentai Dekaranger: 10 Years after (2015) – Senichi Enari/Deka Green
- Space Squad: Gavan vs. Dekaranger (2017) – Senichi Enari/Deka Green

=== Web dramas ===
- From Episode of Stinger: Uchu Sentai Kyuranger: High School Wars (2017) – Kouchou Indaver (Voice) and Seitokaichou Indaver (Voice)

=== Dubbing ===
- Power Rangers S.P.D. (2011) – Bridge Carson/SPD Green Ranger
- Power Rangers Mystic Force (2012) – Matoombo

=== Anime ===
- Shirokuma Cafe (2012–2013) – Tapir, Mandrill, Father, Customer, Maruyama, and Brazilian Porcupine
- Yu-Gi-Oh! Zexal II (2012) – Chitaro Ariga
- When Marnie Was There (2014)
- Aragne no Mushikago (2018) – Tokiyo

=== Musicals and stageplays ===
- Rock Musical Bleach (2005) – Kisuke Urahara
- Rock Musical Bleach Saien (2006) – Kisuke Urahara
- Bambino (2006) – Ryuta
- Bambino+ (2006) – Ryuta
- Bambino.2 (2007) – Ryuta
- Bambino+ in Yokohama (2007) – Ryuta
- Bambino.0 (2008) – Ryuta
- Bambino+ in Apple ~Shige Last Live!!~ (2008) – Ryuta
- Hiiro no Kakera (2008) – Takuma Onizaki
- Bambino.3&+ (2009) – Ryuta

== Other work ==
- Digimon Savers (Ending theme performance)

== Discography ==
=== Singles ===
Release Date	Title	Catalog number	Track listing
May 31, 2006	One Star	NECM-12124	1. One Star; 2. 小さな宵月 (Chiisa na Yoi Tsuki; The Small Evening Moon); 3. One Star (Original Karaoke); 4. 小さな宵月 (Chiisa na Yoi Tsuki; The Small Evening Moon) (Original Karaoke)
