= Shiori Kanzaki =

Japanese actress

- Born: September 22, 1987 (age 38); Osaka, Japan
- Occupations: TV and film actress
- Known for: Yuka Sanada in Genseishin Justirisers

Shiori Kanzaki (神崎詩織, Kanzaki Shiori; born September 22, 1987) is a Japanese actress. She is best known for playing Yuka Sanada in Genseishin Justirisers.

== Filmography ==
- Bayside Shakedown 2 (2003)
- Genseishin Justirisers (2004) - Yuka Sanada, Riser Kageri
- Super Fleet Sazer-X the Movie: Fight! Star Soldiers (2005) - Yuka Sanada, Riser Kageri

== Television ==
- Toshiie and Matsu (2002) – Chacha
- Genseishin Justirisers (2004–05) – Yuka Sanada
