= Tokyo Takarazuka Theater =

Coordinates: 35°40′22.8″N 139°45′33″E

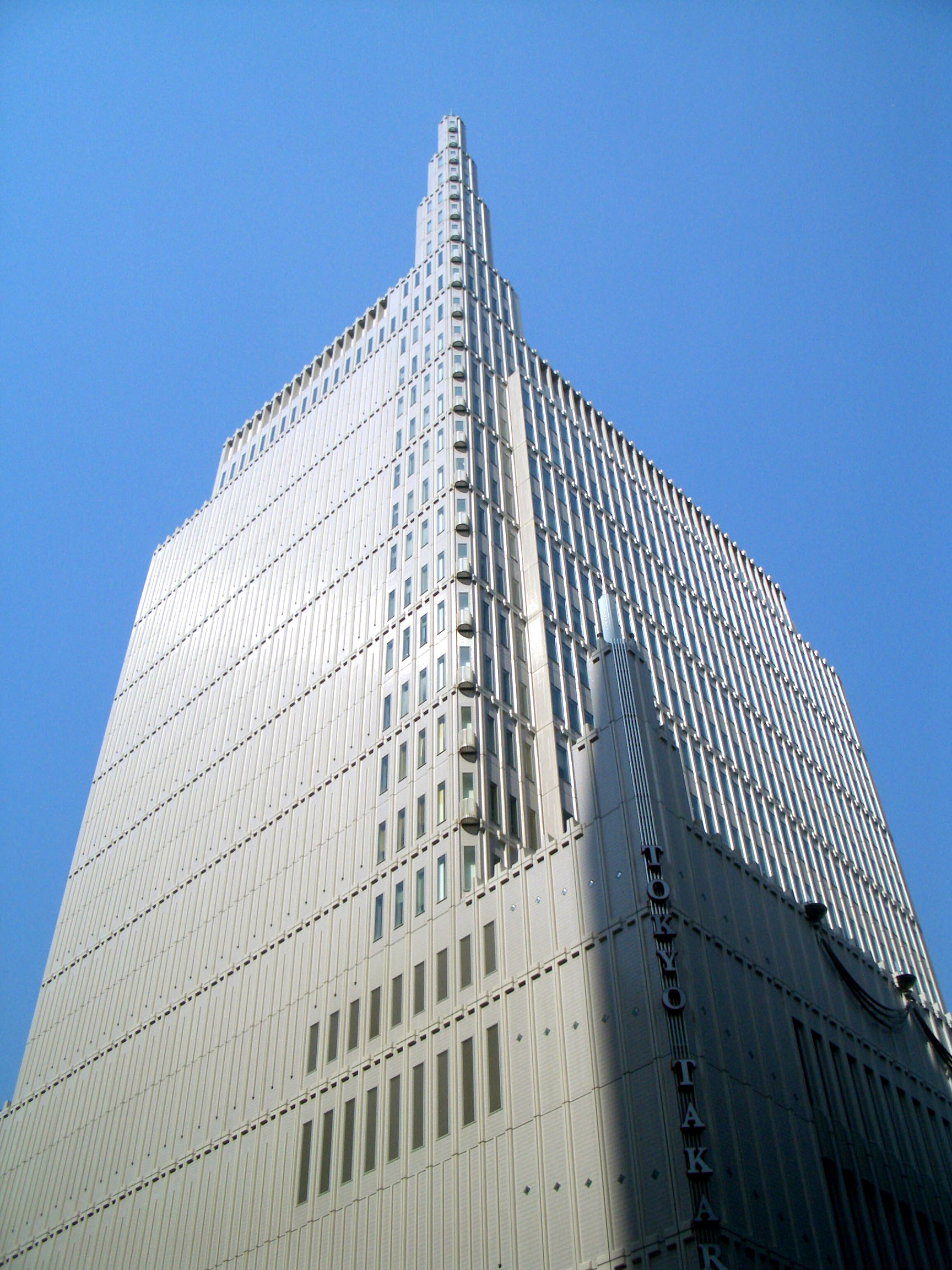
- Interactive map of Tokyo Takarazuka Theater
- Former names: Ernie Pyle Theatre
- Location: 1-1-3 Yurakucho, Chiyoda, Tokyo, Japan
- Owner: Toho
- Seating type: Reserved
- Capacity: 2,069
- Type: Indoor theatre

Construction
- Opened: 1934
- Expanded: 2001
- Demolished: 1998

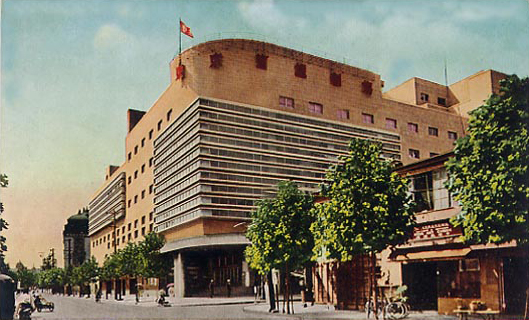
Tokyo Takarazuka Theater (1930s)

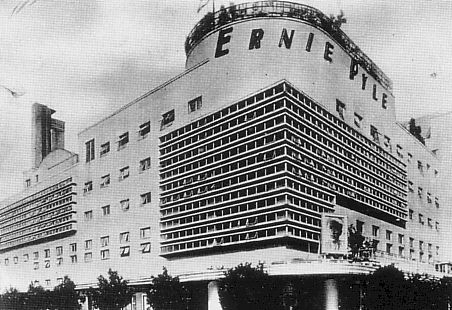
The Tokyo Takarazuka Theater in September 1946, when it had been renamed by American occupation government as the Ernie Pyle Theater

Tokyo Takarazuka Theater (東京宝塚劇場, Tōkyō Takarazuka Gekijō) is another home for Takarazuka Creative Arts in Yūrakuchō, Chiyoda ward, Tokyo.

It served as the second round performing theater for the Revue's performing cycle. The original theater was built in 1934. It was taken over by the American GHQ after the defeat of Japan in 1945 and renamed the "Ernie Pyle Theater" from 1945–55. It was demolished in 1998. The current theater was built in 2001. It has 1,229 seats on the first level and 840 on the second.

Preceded by Sankei Hall	Host of the Kōhaku Uta Gassen; 1956-1957	Succeeded by Shinjuku Koma Theater
Preceded by Shinjuku Koma Theater	Host of the Kōhaku Uta Gassen; 1959	Succeeded by Nihon Theater
Preceded by Nihon Theater	Host of the Kōhaku Uta Gassen; 1961-1972	Succeeded by NHK Hall
