= Miki Satō (actress) =

Japanese actress (born 1980)

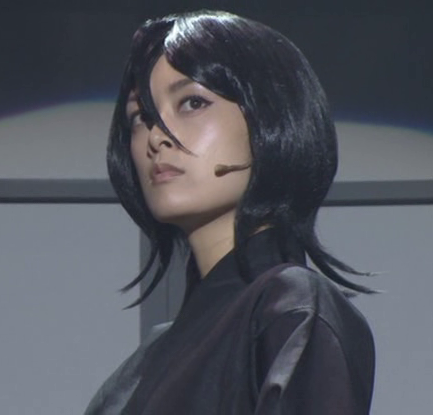
- Miki Satō as Kuchiki Rukia, 2011
- Born: 佐藤美貴 (Satō Miki); April 15, 1980 (age 46); Fukushima Prefecture, Japan
- Occupation: Actress
- Years active: 2004-present

Miki Satō (佐藤 美貴, Satō Miki; born April 15, 1980 in Fukushima Prefecture) is a Japanese actress. She has appeared in the musical Bleach.

== Musical ==
- Bleach Jump festa as Rukia Kuchiki
- Rock Musical BLEACH (2005) as Rukia Kuchiki
- Rock Musical BLEACH Saien (2006) as Rukia Kuchiki
- Rock Musical BLEACH The Dark of the Bleeding Moon (2006) as Rukia Kuchiki
- Rock Musical BLEACH Live Bankai Show Code 001 (2007) as Rukia Kuchiki
- Rock Musical BLEACH No Clouds in Blue Heavens (2007) as Rukia Kuchiki
- Rock Musical BLEACH THE ALL (2008) as Rukia Kuchiki
- Rock Musical BLEACH Live Bankai Show Code 002 (2008) as Rukia Kuchiki
- Rock Musical BLEACH Live Bankai Show Code 003 (2010) as Rukia Kuchiki
- Shinsei Rock Musical BLEACH 10th Anniversary Memorial Tour (2011) as Rukia Kuchiki
- Shinsei Rock Musical BLEACH REprise (2012) as Rukia Kuchiki
