= Kōji Kojima =

Japanese volleyball coach (1930–2014)

Kōji Kojima (小島 孝治, Kojima Kōji; June 26, 1930 – May 27, 2014) was a Japanese Olympic volleyball coach. He led the Japanese Olympic women's volleyball team to a silver medal at the 1972 Summer Olympic Games in Munich.

Kojima became the coach of the Japanese Olympic team in 1970, succeeding Hirobumi Daimatsu, whose women's team had won a gold medal at the 1964 Summer Olympics in Tokyo. Under Kojima, Japan's women's volleyball team won silver in 1972, losing to the Soviet Union in a match played in the aftermath of the Munich massacre.

His team was favored to win gold in the 1980 Summer Olympics in Moscow, but Japan boycotted the games following the Soviet invasion of Afghanistan. Kojima later became the general director for the Japanese athletes at the 1992 Summer Olympics in Barcelona.

Koji Kojima died at a hospital from pneumonia on May 27, 2014, at the age of 83.
