= Bleach (manga) =

Japanese manga series by Tite Kubo

- First tankōbon volume cover, featuring Ichigo Kurosaki
- Genre: Adventure; Martial arts; Supernatural
- Manga
- Written by: Tite Kubo
- Published by: Shueisha
- English publisher: AUS: Madman Entertainment; NA: Viz Media
- Imprint: Jump Comics
- Magazine: Weekly Shōnen Jump
- English magazine: NA: Shonen Jump (former); Weekly Shonen Jump
- Original run: August 7, 2001 – August 22, 2016
- Volumes: 74
- Anime television series
- 2004–2012 series; Thousand-Year Blood War (2022–2026)
- Anime films
- Memories of Nobody (2006); The DiamondDust Rebellion (2007); Fade to Black (2008); Hell Verse (2010)
- Live-action film
- The Soul Reaper Agent Arc (2018)
- Media franchise
- List of Bleach video games; Bleach Trading Card Game
- icon

Bleach (stylized in all caps) is a Japanese manga series written and illustrated by Tite Kubo. It follows teenager Ichigo Kurosaki, who obtains the powers of a Soul Reaper—a death personification similar to a Grim Reaper—from another Soul Reaper, Rukia Kuchiki. He uses his newfound powers to defend humans from evil spirits called Hollows and guide departed souls to the afterlife, which sets him on journeys to various ghostly realms.

Bleach was serialized in Shueisha's shōnen manga magazine Weekly Shōnen Jump from August 2001 to August 2016, with its chapters collected in 74 tankōbon volumes. The series has spawned a media franchise that includes an anime television series adaptation produced by Studio Pierrot from 2004 to 2012, two original video animations (OVAs), four animated feature films, ten stage musicals, and numerous video games, as well as various types of merchandise. A Japanese live-action film adaptation produced by Warner Bros. premiered in 2018. Bleach: Thousand-Year Blood War, a sequel to the anime television series that adapts the manga's final story arc, aired from 2022 to 2026.

In North America, the manga was licensed for English release by Viz Media in 2004. It has released the collected volumes and published its chapters in its Shonen Jump magazine from November 2007 until the magazine's final issue in April 2012.

Bleach received the 50th Shogakukan Manga Award for the shōnen category in 2005. The manga had over 130 million copies in circulation worldwide by 2022, making it one of the best-selling manga in history.

== Plot ==
Ichigo Kurosaki is a teenager from Karakura Town who possesses the rare ability to perceive spirits. This gift leads him to encounter Rukia Kuchiki, a warrior from another world who is hunting a Hollow—a monstrous lost soul that preys on both the living and the dead. Rukia serves among the Soul Reapers (死神, Shinigami; lit. 'Death Gods'), an ancient order tasked with maintaining the balance between worlds. These guardians ferry departed souls to the Soul Society (尸魂界(ソウル・ソサエティ), Sōru Sosaeti) while protecting humanity from Hollows. After sustaining severe injuries while protecting Ichigo from a Hollow, Rukia transfers her powers to him, enabling him to assume her duties while she recuperates within a temporary human body. Stranded in the World of the Living, she mentors Ichigo as he navigates his dual responsibilities as a Substitute Soul Reaper and a high school student. Spiritually aware allies join them: Ichigo's classmate Orihime Inoue, his close friend Yasutora "Chad" Sado, and Uryū Ishida, a Quincy survivor with the ability to manipulate spiritual energy.

The Soul Society later apprehends Rukia for unlawfully bestowing her powers upon a human and sentences her to execution. Determined to rescue her, Ichigo and his companions seek the aid of Kisuke Urahara, a former Soul Reaper scientist who trains Ichigo to awaken his innate Soul Reaper abilities. Upon infiltrating the Soul Society, tensions escalate among the Thirteen Court Squads when Sousuke Aizen, captain of the fifth company, is seemingly assassinated. Suspicion falls upon Ichigo and his allies, prompting the Soul Reapers to turn against one another. After Ichigo halts the conflict and secures Rukia's freedom, Aizen exposes his deception, revealing his orchestration of Rukia's execution to extract the Hōgyoku (崩玉; lit. 'Crumbling Orb'), a powerful artifact concealed within her by Urahara. Aizen flees to Hueco Mundo (虚圏(ウェコムンド), Weko Mundo; lit. 'Hollow World'), the domain of Hollows, alongside his co-conspirators Gin Ichimaru and Kaname Tōsen. In the aftermath, Ichigo is formally recognized as a Substitute Soul Reaper by the Soul Society.

The conflict intensifies as Aizen deploys his elite forces, the Arrancar—humanoid Hollows—against Ichigo and his allies. They are aided by the Vizards, former Soul Reapers who underwent Hollowfication due to Aizen's experiments. When Ulquiorra, one of Aizen's Espada, abducts Orihime, Ichigo and his comrades storm Hueco Mundo to infiltrate Las Noches. Though Ichigo defeats Ulquiorra and retrieves Orihime with the help of his Hollowfication, Aizen reveals his true objective: sacrificing Karakura Town to forge a key to the Soul King's Palace and overthrow the ruler of the Soul Society. The Soul Reapers, anticipating his assault, relocate the town and engage Aizen's Arrancar forces. Gin Ichimaru betrays Aizen but is slain, prompting Aizen to transcend into a near-divine state using the Hōgyoku. Ichigo sacrifices all of his Soul Reaper powers to defeat him, resulting in Aizen's imprisonment and Ichigo's reversion to an ordinary human.

Months later, Ichigo is drawn into a conflict with Xcution, a group of Fullbringers—humans with supernatural abilities—led by Kugo Ginjo, his predecessor as Substitute Soul Reaper. After Xcution manipulates him into surrendering his Fullbring powers, the Soul Reapers restore his Soul Reaper abilities. Ichigo learns of Ginjo's betrayal, stemming from the Soul Society's surveillance and suppression of Substitute Soul Reapers. Despite this revelation, Ichigo reaffirms his trust in his allies and defeats Ginjo, reclaiming his role as a Substitute Soul Reaper.

The conflict reignites when the Wandenreich (見えざる帝国(ヴァンデンライヒ), Vandenraihi; lit. 'Invisible Empire'), an army of Quincies led by Yhwach, declares war on the Soul Society. After subjugating Hueco Mundo, they launch a devastating assault, killing numerous Soul Reapers, including Head-Captain Yamamoto. Uryū joins Yhwach, uncovering the truth behind his mother's death. In the final battle, Ichigo and his allies storm Yhwach's palace, defeating his elite Sternritters. Yhwach attempts to annihilate the Soul Society, but Ichigo, aided by Uryū and the temporarily freed Aizen, ultimately destroys him.

A decade later, Rukia assumes command of the thirteenth company and raises a daughter, Ichika, with her childhood companion Renji Abarai. Ichigo and Orihime marry and have a son, Kazui, who inherits his father's spiritual abilities. Two years afterward, Ichigo participates in the Soul Funeral Ceremony for Captain Jūshirō Ukitake. While assisting lieutenants in Karakura Town to capture Hollows for the ritual, they are ambushed by the Beasts of Hell, led by the resurrected Espada Szayelaporro Granz. Though the lieutenants repel the attack, it is revealed that the ceremony serves as a means to consign deceased captains, including Ukitake, to Hell.

== Production ==
The concept for Bleach originated from Tite Kubo's interest in depicting a shinigami (Soul Reaper) wearing a kimono, which became the foundational design for the Soul Reapers in the series. An initial concept featured Soul Reapers using guns, leading to the working title "Snipe"; this one-shot was published in Akamaru Jump in 2000. The title was changed last-minute to reflect the introduction of swords, though the initial announcement still used "Snipe." Subsequent title considerations included "Black"—a reference to the Soul Reapers' attire—which Kubo rejected as too generic. "White" was also considered, but he ultimately chose "Bleach" for its association with the color white and because it was less obvious.

The series proposal was submitted to Weekly Shōnen Jump after the cancellation of Kubo's previous work, Zombiepowder., and was initially rejected. Manga artist Akira Toriyama later wrote a letter of encouragement to Kubo after reviewing the concept. Bleach was accepted for serialization in 2001 and was originally planned to run for no more than five years. Early story outlines did not include the hierarchical organization of the Soul Society but incorporated certain elements, such as Ichigo's Soul Reaper heritage, which were not introduced until the Arrancar arc.

Kubo cited diverse influences for Bleach, including manga, music, architecture, film, and foreign languages. His interest in supernatural themes and monsters was inspired by Shigeru Mizuki's GeGeGe no Kitaro. The focus on weaponry and combat drew from Masami Kurumada's Saint Seiya, a series he enjoyed in his youth. Saint Seiya's use of Greek mythology also influenced Bleach's incorporation of mythological elements and themes of the afterlife. Although Kubo acknowledged cinematic influences on the action and narrative pacing, he did not cite specific films as direct references for fight scenes; he mentioned enjoying Snatch but denied using it as a model.

The fight choreography was developed while listening to rock music, which helped Kubo establish a rhythmic flow for panel transitions and perspective shifts. He emphasized realistic injury depictions to enhance the visceral impact of combat and evoke empathy from readers. To break the monotony of illustrating extended action sequences, Kubo frequently inserted comedic interludes. Character design served as the primary driver for narrative development. When facing creative challenges or constructing new plotlines, Kubo often introduced large numbers of new characters or consulted earlier volumes for inspiration. He expressed a preference for characters whose appearances contrasted with their true natures, reflecting a personal interest in such contradictions.

The series employed a multilingual naming scheme to differentiate its factions: Soul Reapers use terms from classical Japanese literature, Hollows, and Arrancar adopted Spanish names, Fullbringers used English (often referencing rock music), and Quincies utilized German. This linguistic diversity reinforced the international scope of the series's settings and character identities.

== Themes and analysis ==
Bleach's plot incorporates the traditional Japanese belief of spirits coexisting with humans, and their nature, good or evil, depends on the circumstances. An example is Orihime's backstory. She was raised from the age of three by her brother Sora, and prayed for his soul's peace after he died in a car accident. As time went on, she prayed less and Sora became jealous and turned into a Hollow and attacked Orihime. Academic Patrick Drazen says this is a reminder to the audience not to abandon the old ways or risk the spirits taking offense and causing problems in the world. Bleach also incorporates Shinto themes of purification of "evil spirits through charms, scrolls, incantations, and other rituals". Christopher A. Born regards Bleach as transmitting Confucian values.

Von Feigenblatt describes Bleach as being culturally and religiously aware, as it draws upon Christianity and Caribbean Santería. Spanish terms are prevalent throughout the realm of Hueco Mundo, and Quincies have been known to associate with the German language, making Kubo's world of characters diverse in ethnicity and language as well. Feigenblatt notes that the Quincy "are clearly inspired by the Roman Catholic Christian Orders of Knighthood such as the Sovereign Military Order of Malta and the Equestrian Order of the Holy Sepulchre whose influence is shown in terms of the uniform worn by the Quincy as well as by the symbolism of the cross".

== Media ==
=== Manga ===
Written and illustrated by Tite Kubo, Bleach was serialized for 15 years in Shueisha's shōnen manga magazine Weekly Shōnen Jump from August 7, 2001, to August 22, 2016. Its 698 individual chapters (Note: Comprising 686 listed chapters and 12 chapters which were listed as -108 to -97.) were collected in 74 tankōbon volumes released between January 5, 2002, and November 4, 2016. Shueisha published the first 21 volumes compiled into six omnibus collections under the name Resurrected Souls, to celebrate the series' tenth anniversary. The first collection was released on August 22, 2011; the last collection was released on January 23, 2012.

The manga was licensed for English release in North America by Viz Media. The 74 volumes were released from July 6, 2004, to October 2, 2018. Viz Media also released a hardcover "collector's edition" of the first volume that came with a dust jacket, two box sets, and twenty-five 3-in-1 volumes between June 7, 2011, and March 5, 2019. The series ran in the publisher's print magazine Shonen Jump from its November 2007 to April 2012 issues. It moved to the digital anthology Weekly Shonen Jump Alpha in January 2012 and Viz Media released its chapters digitally as they were published by Shueisha in Japan.

A 73-page chapter, titled "New Breathes From Hell" (獄頤鳴鳴篇, Gokui Meimei-hen), was published in Weekly Shōnen Jump, to commemorate the 20th anniversary of the manga's debut in the magazine, on August 10, 2021. It was published in English by Viz Media's Shonen Jump online magazine and on the Shueisha's Manga Plus online platform. The one-shot ends seemingly on a cliffhanger; the character for "hen" (篇), used in the Japanese title of the chapter, is usually used to denote the title of a story arc. The chapter was digitally released as a collected volume on December 3, 2021. A full-color version of the chapter was published digitally on September 4, 2023.

=== Anime ===
Bleach was adapted by Studio Pierrot into an anime television series directed by Noriyuki Abe and broadcast for 366 episodes on TV Tokyo from October 2004 to March 2012.

A follow-up series, Bleach: Thousand-Year Blood War, was broadcast on TV Tokyo for 50 episodes, split into four cours, from October 2022 to October 2026. Tomohisa Taguchi directed the first two cours, and Hikaru Murata directed the following two.

=== Films ===
The series has spawned four animated films: Bleach: Memories of Nobody, released on December 16, 2006; Bleach: The DiamondDust Rebellion, released on December 22, 2007; Bleach: Fade to Black, released on December 13, 2008; and Bleach: Hell Verse, released on December 4, 2010. A live-action film adaptation premiered in Japan on July 20, 2018.

=== Light novels ===
Tite Kubo and Makoto Matsubara have co-authored three novelizations of the Bleach series, which were published by Shueisha under its Jump J-Books imprint. The first volume, Bleach – Letters From The Other Side: The Death and The Strawberry, was published on December 15, 2004, and re-released as Bleach – Letters From The Other Side: The Death and The Strawberry - New Edition on November 4, 2009. The second, Bleach: The Honey Dish Rhapsody, was published on October 30, 2006. The third, Bleach: The Death Save the Strawberry, was published on September 4, 2012. A two-volume novelization of the series co-authored by Ryōgo Narita, titled Bleach: Spirits Are Forever With You was released on June 4, 2012.

Shueisha published four novelizations based on the Bleach movies. The first volume, Bleach: Memories of Nobody, was published on December 18, 2006. The second, Bleach: The DiamondDust Rebellion, Another Hyōrinmaru, was published on December 22, 2007. The third, Bleach: Fade to Black, I Call Your Name, was published on December 15, 2008. The fourth volume, Bleach: Hell Chapter, was published on December 6, 2010.

After the series ended in 2016, a series of novels were released by Shueisha. The first novel, Bleach: We Do Knot Always Love You, was written by Matsubara and published on December 27, 2016. The second, Bleach: Can't Fear Your Own World, is a serialized novel written by Narita and was released bi-weekly from April 28, 2017. Three volumes were released from August 4, 2017, to December 4, 2018. Viz Media published the three volumes of Bleach: Can't Fear Your Own World between July 7, 2020, and April 20, 2021.

A new novel adaptation by Narita, titled Don't Bleach My Fist, was announced in December 2025.

=== Video games ===
Several video games based on the Bleach series have been released, primarily though not exclusively fighting games. The first video game to be released from the Bleach series was Bleach: Heat the Soul, which debuted on March 24, 2005, for the PlayStation Portable. Currently, the majority of the games have only been released in Japan, though Sega has localized the first three Nintendo DS games and the first Wii game for North America. So far, all dedicated Bleach games released for Sony's consoles have been developed and published by SCEI, whereas the games for Nintendo consoles are developed and published by Sega, and the Nintendo DS games are developed by Treasure Co. Ltd. Two mobile games had also been released in 2014 (Bleach: Bankai Battle) and 2015 (Bleach: Brave Souls) for the series, which are available for iOS and Android. In 2017, Line announced the release of a game exclusive for their communication app called Bleach: Paradise Lost. In July 2023, a console video game titled Bleach: Soul Resonance, published by Nuverse, was announced. In July 2024, a video game titled Bleach: Rebirth of Souls was announced. It was released by Bandai Namco Entertainment for the PlayStation 4, PlayStation 5, Windows (via Steam), and Xbox Series X/S on March 21, 2025. A mobile game, titled Bleach Mirrors High, was announced in December 2025. Bandai Namco Entertainment held a closed beta test from July 22–29, 2026, with applications open until July 13. It was released on October 28, 2026.

=== Trading card game ===
Two collectible card games (CCG) based on the Bleach series have been created. First, one in the Japanese market and a different one in North America. Bleach Soul Card Battle, produced by Bandai, was introduced in Japan at the Jump Festa in 2004. Twenty named sets were released for the series. After Bleach Soul Card Battle, Bandai introduced three more series. Bleach The Card Gum, which contains 14 sets, was released in early September 2007. The next series, Bleach Clear Collection, which contains six sets, was released in July 2008. The last series, Bleach Clear Soul Plate, which consists of three sets, was published in December 2009.

Bleach TCG was introduced in the United States by Score Entertainment in May 2007, but ceased publication April 2009, just before the planned launch of its seventh expansion, Bleach Infiltration. This cancellation was attributed to the 2007–09 recession, which has heavily affected TCG sales. Designed by Aik Tongtharadol, the TCG is a two-player game in which each player starts with at least 61 cards: a "Guardian" card, a 60-card "main deck", and an optional 20-card "side deck". A player loses if their power, as dictated by the Guardian card, is reduced to zero, or if he or she is unable to draw or discard a card from their deck. The cards for the game have been released in named sets with each set released in three formats: a 72-card pre-constructed box set containing a starter deck and two booster packs, a 10-card booster pack, and a 12-pack booster box.

=== Musicals ===
Bleach has been adapted into a series of rock musicals, jointly produced by Pierrot and Nelke Planning. There have been five musicals produced which covered portions of the Substitute and Soul Society arcs, as well as five additional performances known as "Live Bankai Shows" and "Rock Musical Bleach Shinsei", which did not follow the Bleach plotline. The initial performance run of the Bleach musical was from August 17–28, 2005, at the Space Zero Tokyo center in Shinjuku.

The musicals are directed by Takuya Hiramitsu, with script adaptation by Naoshi Okumura and music composed by playwright Shoichi Tama. The songs are completely original and not taken from the anime soundtrack. Key actors in the series include Tatsuya Isaka, who plays Ichigo Kurosaki, Miki Satō, who plays Rukia Kuchiki, and Eiji Moriyama, who plays Renji Abarai.

In 2016, another musical was produced to celebrate the 15th anniversary of Bleach. The musical was directed and written by Tsutsumi Yasuyuki with Dream5's Akira Takano and Chihiro Kai as Ichigo Kurosaki and Rukia Kuchiki, respectively. The musical debuted on July 28, 2016, in AiiA 2.5 Theater Tokyo.

=== Other media ===
The first Bleach artbook, All Colour But The Black, was released in Japan, the United States, and Europe. The artbook compiles a selection of color spreads from the first 19 volumes of the series, some original art, and author commentary. The second artbook, Bleach Official Bootleg: KaraBuri+ (BLEACH OFFICIAL BOOTLEG カラブリ プラス), was released on August 3, 2007. In addition to character guides and articles on other fictional aspects of the series, it compiles the various short comics, Tedious Everyday Tales Colorful Bleach (徒然日常絵詞 カラフル ブリーチ, Tsuredure Nichijou Ekotoba Karafuru Buriichi), that were published in V Jump. The omake-style panels are similar to those included in the main series, but reveal more of the daily lives of characters. Color Bleach+: Bleach Official Bootleg was released in English by Viz Media on August 10, 2010. In December 2018, another artbook, titled Bleach JET was released, which contains a massive 700 artworks from the series' 15-year tenure.

Seven databooks have also been released about the series. The first two, Bleach: Official Character Book SOULs. and Bleach: Official Animation Book VIBEs., were released on February 3, 2006. Bleach: Official Character Book SOULs. was later released in English by Viz Media on November 18, 2008. The third book, Bleach: Official Character Book 2: MASKED, was released on August 4, 2010. This book details characters who appear 100 years before the story, such as former captains and lieutenants, as well as Arrancars and Visoreds. Although it was released on the same day as volume 46, Back From Blind, the book only covers material up to volume 37, Beauty Is So Solitary. The English version was released by Viz Media on March 6, 2012. A fourth book, Bleach: Official Invitation Book The Hell Verse, was given to the first one million movie-goers of Bleach: Hell Verse on December 4, 2010. It contains character sketches, promotional posters, and the one-off Hell manga special. A fifth book Bleach: Official Character Book 3: UNMASKED, was released on June 3, 2011, the same day as the volume 50 of the series. However it only covers material up to volume 48, God is Dead. On June 4, 2012, a sixth book was released under the name Bleach: The Rebooted Souls. This free booklet was distributed with Bleach manga volume 55, with the aim to provide information to readers about the manga's final arc, The Thousand-Year Blood War. The seventh book, BLEACH 13 BLADEs., was released on August 4, 2015, and it is focused solely on the Soul Reapers and the 13 Court Squads.

Shueisha published a special book Bleach: JCCover Postcard Book MAILs., which was released on December 4, 2013. It features cover pages as postcards up to volume 60 with poems on the back.

== Reception ==
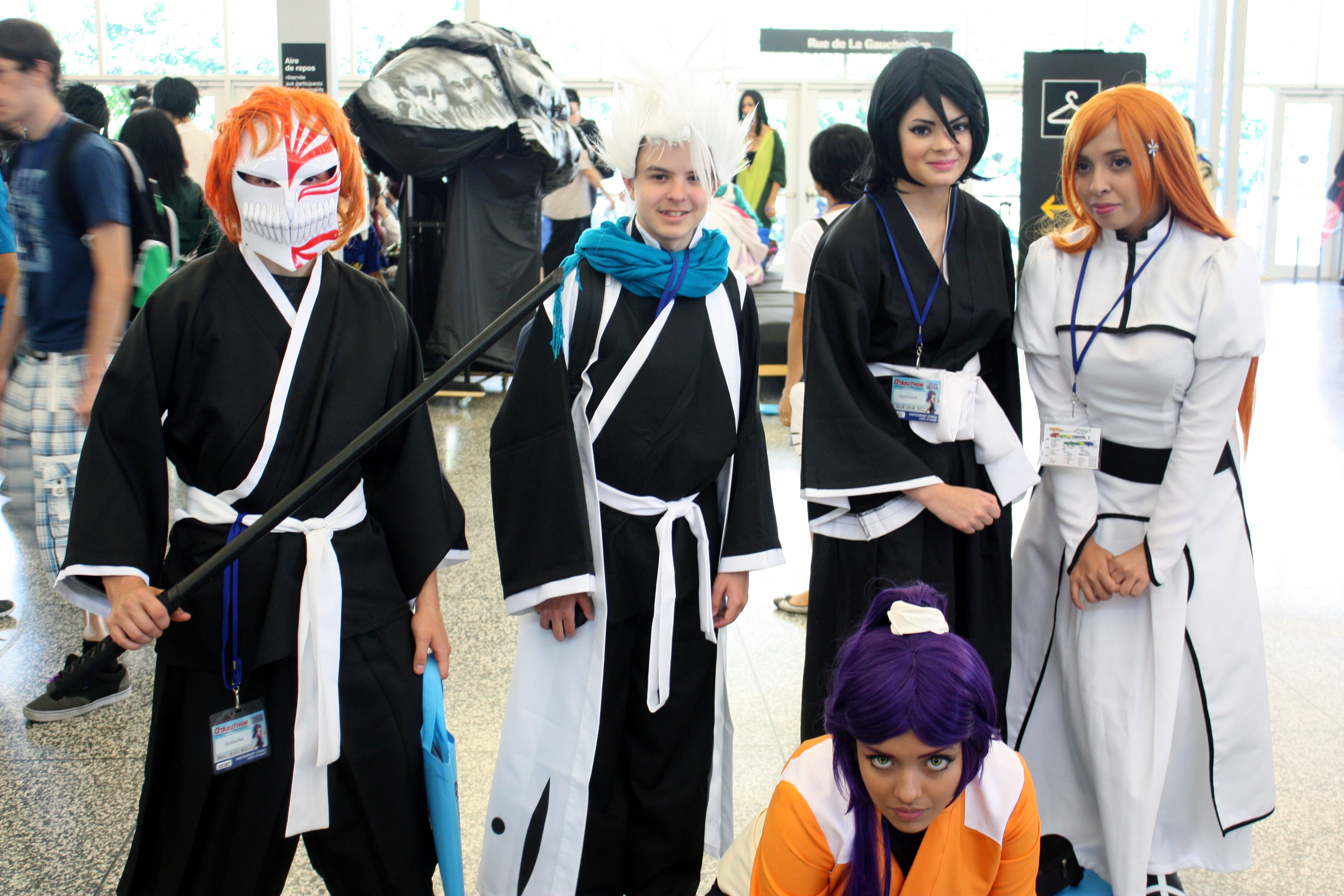
Fans dressed as Bleach characters in 2014

=== Sales ===
Bleach had over 90 million tankōbon copies in circulation in Japan by 2017; over 120 million tankōbon copies in circulation worldwide by 2018; and over 130 million copies in circulation worldwide by 2022, making it one of the best-selling manga series of all time. During 2008, volume 34 of the manga sold 874,153 copies in Japan, becoming the 12th best-selling comic series of the year. Volumes 33 and 35 have also ranked 17 and 18, respectively. In total, the manga has sold 3,161,825 copies in Japan during 2008, becoming the year's fifth best-selling series. In the first half of 2009, Bleach ranked as the second best-selling manga in Japan, having sold 3.5 million copies. Having sold 927,610 copies, volume 36 ranked seventh, volume 37 was eighth with 907,714 copies sold, and volume 38 at 10th with 822,238 copies.

North American sales of the manga have also been high, with tankōbon volumes having sold over 1.2 million copies by 2007. Volume 16 placed in the top ten best-selling graphic novels of December 2006 and volume 17 was the best-selling manga volume for the month of February 2007. In a 2010 interview, Gonzalo Ferreyra, Vice President of Sales and Marketing for Viz, listed Bleach as one of six Viz titles that continue to exceed expectations in spite of the harshening manga market. By 2022, the manga had over 2.7 million tankōbon volumes in circulation in the United States.

=== Critical reception ===
Deb Aoki from About.com named the series the "Best Continuing Shōnen Manga of 2007", along with Eyeshield 21, praising the "compelling stories, dazzling action sequences and great character development". She also placed the title on her list of "Top 10 Shōnen Manga Must-Reads". The artwork and the character designs received a positive response from IGN's A.E. Sparrow. He also commented on the series' ability to handle multiple minor character plotlines simultaneously, which he considered a point of appeal, in response to fans' claims concerning a "lack of a story" in Bleach. Leroy Douresseaux from Comic Book Bin agreed with Sparrow in the number of storylines, but also praised the fighting scenes finding them comparable to the ones of popular films. Contrarily, Mania reviewer Jarred Pine criticized the series as being plagued with stereotypes from the genre. He felt it was a rough start for the series with unimpressive battles, overused gags, and a poor introduction to the central character Ichigo, that caused him to come across "as a frowning punk" with one good trait: his desire to protect. Despite this, Pine notes that he loved the series, particularly its quirky, lovable characters. Jason Thompson said he was no longer able to take Bleach seriously after it introduced villains Ulquiorra and Yammy in a scene precisely mirroring Vegeta and Nappa's arrival in Dragon Ball Z, but acknowledged it was likely intended as a deliberate homage. He also said Kubo was able to avoid the worst artistic failings typical in series that indulge in superpowered combat, but that the battle scenes were still sometimes difficult to follow.

=== Accolades ===
In 2005, Bleach was awarded the 50th Shogakukan Manga Award in the shōnen category. The English version of the manga was nominated for the "best manga" and "best theme" awards at the 2006 and 2007 American Anime Awards, but did not win in either category.

In November 2014, readers of Media Factory's Da Vinci magazine voted Bleach the 16th greatest Weekly Shōnen Jump manga series of all time. On TV Asahi's Manga Sōsenkyo 2021 poll, in which 150,000 people voted for their top 100 manga series, Bleach ranked 23rd.

== See also ==
- Burn the Witch, another manga series created by Kubo and set in the Bleach universe
- Loituma Girl
