= Rukia Kuchiki =

Fictional character from Bleach

- Bleach character
- Rukia Kuchiki as seen in the manga
- First appearance: Bleach #1 "Death & Strawberry" (2001)
- Created by: Tite Kubo
- Portrayed by: Hana Sugisaki
- Voiced by: Japanese; Fumiko Orikasa; English; Michelle Ruff; Cassandra Lee Morris (live-action film)

In-universe information
- Species: Soul Reaper
- Family: Hisana Kuchiki (older sister, deceased); Byakuya Kuchiki (brother-in-law, adoptive brother); Soujun Kuchiki (adoptive father, deceased); Unnamed adoptive mother (deceased)
- Spouse: Renji Abarai (husband)
- Children: Ichika Abarai (daughter)
- Relatives: Ginrei Kuchiki (adoptive grandfather)

Rukia Kuchiki (Japanese: 朽木 ルキア, Hepburn: Kuchiki Rukia) is a fictional character in the anime and manga series Bleach created by Tite Kubo. In the series, she is a Soul Reaper, (死神, Shinigami, literally 'Death God'), in charge of slaying and eradicating corrupted souls called Hollows, whose unfortunate fate lies destined for ruthless killing and feeding off of living beings. Rukia also performs konsō (魂葬, Soul Funeral), sending human spirits who have not yet crossed over to the Soul Society. At the beginning, after a brief meeting with the protagonist of the series, Ichigo Kurosaki, who can see supernatural beings such as Soul Reapers, she transfers her powers to him in order to fulfill her duties as a Soul Reaper. Rukia has appeared in several other pieces of Bleach media, including the four feature films in the series, the two original video animations and several video games.

Rukia was the first character of the series created by Kubo, her design being the one he decided to use for all the other Soul Reapers. Reaction to her character is generally positive, with praise aimed at her differences from typical shōnen heroines and her interactions with other characters. Additionally, she usually ranks second in Weekly Shōnen Jump's Bleach popularity polls, and is consistently the most popular female character in those polls. Several pieces of merchandise have been released in Rukia's likeness, including a plush doll and several figurines.

== Creation and conception ==
Bleach was first conceived from Tite Kubo's desire to draw a shinigami in a kimono, which formed the basis for the design of the Soul Reapers. Because of this, Rukia was one of the first characters of the series to be created. Before deciding that every Soul Reaper had swords, Kubo thought that they should all use guns, while only Rukia used a scythe. However, this was changed when he created the Soul Reaper kimono. Kubo also mentioned that Rukia did not seem like a lead character, so he created Ichigo Kurosaki to be the series protagonist, with Rukia being the first female lead. Ichigo's initial design had black hair like Rukia; Kubo had to modify Ichigo's appearance to contrast with hers, giving Ichigo orange hair and a trademark scowl.

As for her name, Kubo stated that, because Rukia "looks like a shinigami", he wanted her name to sound like something a shinigami would have as a name. When deciding upon her family name, Kubo considered using "Kuchiru" (朽ちる; lit. "to rot") because it sounded like a name a shinigami would have. He decided to use "Kuchiki" (朽木; lit. "rotten wood"), having once heard something that sounded like "Kuchiki Rukia" on Japanese television and liking it enough to use it as a name. Her first name was conceived as a result of Kubo hearing the Latin name for cosmos on television, and later decided that the name really suited her since the Latin word from which her name is derived means "light" and Kubo sees her as "a ray of light for Ichigo." Shonen Jump asked in an interview if Kubo had any plans to make Ichigo and Rukia a couple, but Kubo chose neither to confirm nor deny it. After designing Rukia's zanpakutō, Kubo noted he liked it a lot and made it the most beautiful one from the series.

When asked to design a Christmas cover with a female character, Kubo initially thought of using Rukia, but eventually chose Orihime Inoue as he thought the character was better suited for it—he has stated that he previously made a Christmas illustration with Rukia, and that he received requests from several fans wanting to see the image. In contrast to this, Kubo has found that he liked Rukia more in the illustrations where her face expresses pain, such as when she is going to be executed in the manga.

== Appearances ==
=== In Bleach ===
Rukia meets Ichigo in the midst of a hollow attack. After suffering severe injuries, she transfers her powers to him in order to save themselves. Without her powers, Rukia cannot return to the Soul Society. She accompanies Ichigo in the real world, intending to stay until her powers are restored. Therefore, her only ability is her kidō spells, which are severely limited in strength and variety. She uses her kidō for such purposes as restraining, healing and attacking others. Because of the amount of time she spends with Ichigo, Rukia manages to gain a keen understanding of his inner workings. Rukia's relationship with Ichigo is unique, for despite the relatively short amount of time they have known each other, Ichigo can easily confide in her and considers her a true friend because she is encouraging and understands what he is feeling. During her time in the human world, Rukia remains unaccounted for in Soul Society, so Byakuya Kuchiki and Renji Abarai are sent to find her and return her to the Soul Society. They succeed, and upon their return Rukia is sentenced to death for giving her Soul Reaper powers to a human. Ichigo goes to the Soul Society, in order to save her.

During the arc, Rukia's past is explored. She died as an infant and was sent to the Soul Society with her older sister, Hisana. Though Hisana initially tried to protect and provide for Rukia, she could not ensure her own survival while caring for a baby as well, and thus abandoned Rukia. As Rukia grew up, she befriended Renji Abarai, and entered the Soul Reaper academy, where she was adopted into the Kuchiki family. One year prior to the adoption, Hisana died after asking Byakuya to find and adopt Rukia as his sister. This remains unknown to Rukia, until Byakuya confesses it to her. When she was accepted into the 13th Division, Rukia befriended the lieutenant of her division, Kaien Shiba, and trained under him. During the course of a mission, Kaien was possessed by a hollow and Rukia inadvertently kills him.

During Rukia's bid for freedom, she is stopped by Sousuke Aizen and his accomplices. Aizen, having singlehandedly orchestrated Rukia's execution, reveals to her that within her soul is stored the Hōgyoku ("breakdown sphere"), a powerful artifact created and placed there by Kisuke Urahara that gives hollows Soul Reaper powers and vice versa. Wanting the Hōgyoku for himself, Aizen hoped that her death would give him access to it, but settles for a nonfatal alternative. The Hōgyoku is removed from her body, Aizen and his men flee Soul Society, and Rukia is acquitted of all charges. With the Hōgyoku, Aizen is able to create an army of arrancar, which he uses to attack Ichigo and his friends once they return to the human world. Rukia and a group of other Soul Reapers are sent to assist in fighting the arrancar, though after Aizen captures Orihime Inoue they are recalled to Soul Society. Rukia's zanpakutō, Sode no Shirayuki (袖白雪; literally "Sleeved white snow"), is also revealed as a completely white blade, earning it the recognition as the most beautiful zanpakutō in Soul Society. Sode no Shirayuki utilizes ice to attack, each of its abilities being labeled as "dances" by Rukia. During the anime's 13th season, Sode no Shirayuki manifests in a yukionna-like form, voiced by Mie Sonozaki.

After learning that Aizen kidnapped Orihime, Rukia and friends head for Hueco Mundo to save her. There, Rukia encounters the Espada, Aaroniero Arruruerie, who is revealed to have possession of Kaien's body. Saddened that she had not saved her mentor from the control of a hollow as she had previously thought, Rukia manages to kill Aaroniero. Rukia is badly injured during the battle, and it is not until Soul Society sends reinforcements to Hueco Mundo that she is revived and her wounds are healed. She later assists Ichigo in his rescue to save Orihime from the Espada Ulquiorra Cifer by engaging the remaining Arrancars until requiring support. After Aizen's defeat, Rukia bids farewell to Ichigo, when he loses his powers and the ability to sense their presence.

Seventeen months later, Rukia, now lieutenant of Squad 13, returns to aid in restoring Ichigo's Soul Reaper powers before engaging the Fullbringer Riruka Dokugamine. When the Soul Society is abruptly invaded by the Wandenreich, an organization made up of Quincy who has survived their genocide one thousand years before, Rukia discovers Byakuya attacked by Äs Nodt, and is knocked out before she can come to her aid. Rukia is taken to the Royal Dimension so she could be healed, and is then taught by Ichibe'e Hyōsube to achieve her bankai, Hakka no Togame (白霞罸; literally "Censure of the white haze"). Returning to the Soul Society when the Wandenreich resume their attack, Rukia utilizes her newly acquired bankai to defeat Äs. In the subsequent battles against Yhwach's Schutzstaffel Rukia and a large number of high rank Soul Reapers are quickly defeated by the powerful Gerard Valkyrie. After Ichigo defeats Yhwach, Rukia becomes the new Squad 13 captain and marries Renji. They have a daughter, Ichika.

=== In other media ===
Rukia makes several appearances outside of the Bleach anime and manga. She appears in four films in the series: she fights the Dark Ones with other Soul Reaper comrades in Bleach: Memories of Nobody and aids in the search for Tōshirō Hitsugaya in Bleach: The DiamondDust Rebellion. Rukia has the main focus role in the third film, Bleach: Fade to Black, where she is kidnapped and mind-wiped by two mysterious rogues, and later transformed into 'Dark Rukia'. In the fourth film, Bleach: Hell Verse, Rukia helps Ichigo rescue his sister Yuzu from the depths of Hell. Rukia appears in both of the original video animations produced in the series, helping Ichigo in Memories in the Rain and combating the rogue Soul Reaper Baishin in The Sealed Sword Frenzy. In Rock Musical Bleach, a musical based on the Bleach series, she is played by Miki Satō. In the Bleach video games, Rukia is a playable character in every game, including the Heat the Soul and Blade Battlers series. In some games, her human form and Soul Reaper state are available as separate characters, while Dark Rukia is playable in Heat the Soul 6 and Heat the Soul 7. Rukia appears in the live-action adaptation of the manga, Bleach. She is played by Hana Sugisaki and the film took place during the Soul Reaper Agent arc, when she had to transfer her powers to Ichigo. The film opened in Japan on July 20, 2018.

== Reception ==
Rukia has ranked highly in the Weekly Shōnen Jump popularity polls for the series, placing in the top five most popular characters in all four polls. She was ranked as the second most popular character after Ichigo in the first two polls, and fell to third place in the third poll, being replaced by Tōshirō Hitsugaya. In early 2008, she was voted the second most popular character in Bleach, receiving 383 votes less than the front runner, Tōshirō Hitsugaya. Her zanpakutō, Sode no Shirayuki, ranked 2nd in the zanpakutō popularity poll of the series. In 2009, Rukia ranked 4th in a survey of the Japanese music distributor Recochoku titled "The Character I Want to Be My Bride". In a 2007 character poll from the Japanese magazine Newtype magazine character polls, Rukia has been featured as one of the most popular female characters from any anime. She has also appeared twice in the Anime Grand Prix polls, ranking as one of the most popular female anime characters. NTT customers voted her as their eighth favorite black haired female anime character.

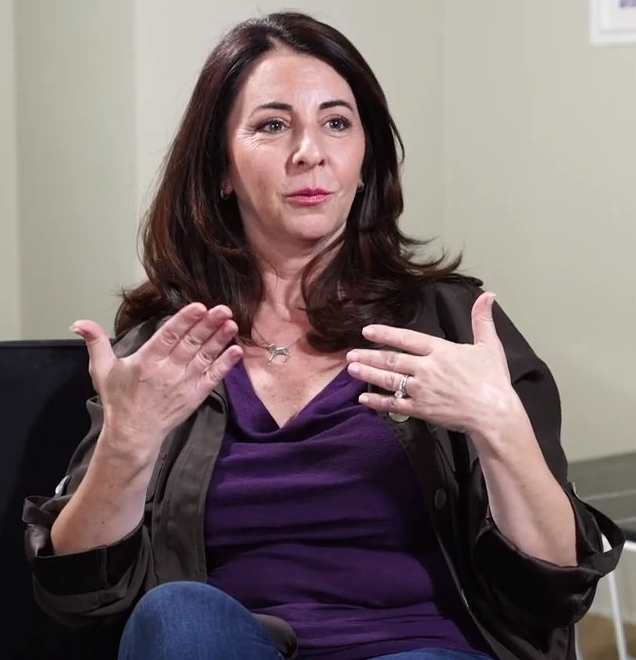
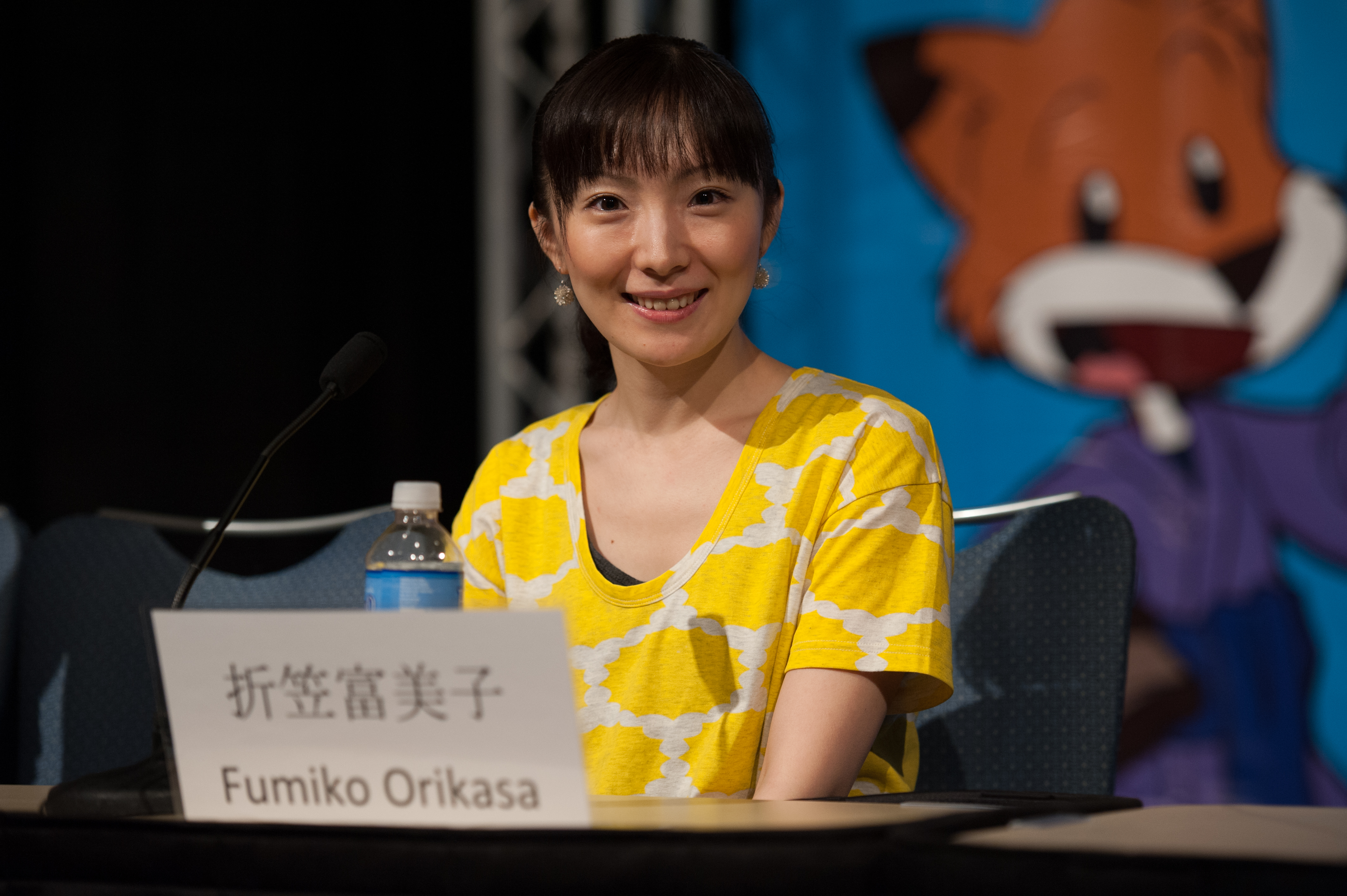
Michelle Ruff (left) voices Rukia in the English dub of the anime, and Fumiko Orikasa (right) voices Rukia in the Japanese dub.

Merchandise based on Rukia's appearance has been released, including a key chain, a plush doll, and a figurine. Fumiko Orikasa, Rukia's Japanese voice actor, liked how Rukia was developed while fighting against the arrancar, noting her to be a hero during her introductions. However, she was saddened by how after Rukia defeats the first arrancar (Di Roy Rinker), she is instantly stabbed by the arrancar Grimmjow. Michelle Ruff, Rukia's English voice actress, found Rukia to be a "survivor", due to how lonely she initially was and how she has been developed through the anime series as she had to start trusting people. She also liked how cool Rukia is when she is fighting but noted it challenging how to voice Rukia due to her various attitudes. Ruff was the winner in the category "Best Voice Actress (English)" from the 2009 SPJA Industry Awards for her work as Rukia. Rukia also won in the category "Best Female Character" based on her appearances on Bleach: Memories of Nobody.

Several publications for manga, anime, video games, and other related media have provided praise and criticism on Rukia's character. Although Chris Beveridge from Mania Entertainment noted Rukia's introduction in Bleach was typical in several others series, he praised how she interacted with her schoolmates and Ichigo. Anime News Network's (ANN) Melissa Harper praised the differences between Rukia and stereotypical shōnen heroines, asserting that Rukia's loss of her powers and subsequent dependence on Ichigo were "a great source of both drama and comedy in the show." However, the removal of the humor from Rukia's scenes as a schoolgirl due to the English translation was lamented, although Ruff was extolled for doing an "excellent job." Carlos Alexandre from popcultureshock.com regarded her as "less of a foil to Ichigo and more like the other side of the same coin". Her actions and words were also commented by Alexendre to make Rukia deserve the respect she commands. IGN called the scene where Rukia is forced to leave Ichigo Kurosaki and return to Soul Society as "touchingly beautiful" and celebrated Rukia's character development during her time in the human world. Her subsequent appearances in Soul Society were criticized by ANN's Theron Martin due to her lack of activity making them "irritating given how strong a character she was in the series' early going".

In his review of the live-action film, Rob Hunter from the Film School Rejects criticised the narrative of the story, especially when the female lead character, Rukia played by Hana Sugisaki, had to be reduced into a supporting-type character for the male lead character, Ichigo played by Sota Fukushi. He further praised Sugisaki's performances and lamented the fact that the actress was given weak materials for the film.

== See also ==
- List of Bleach characters
