= Shinjuku Koma Theater =

Coordinates: 35.695262°N 139.701988°E

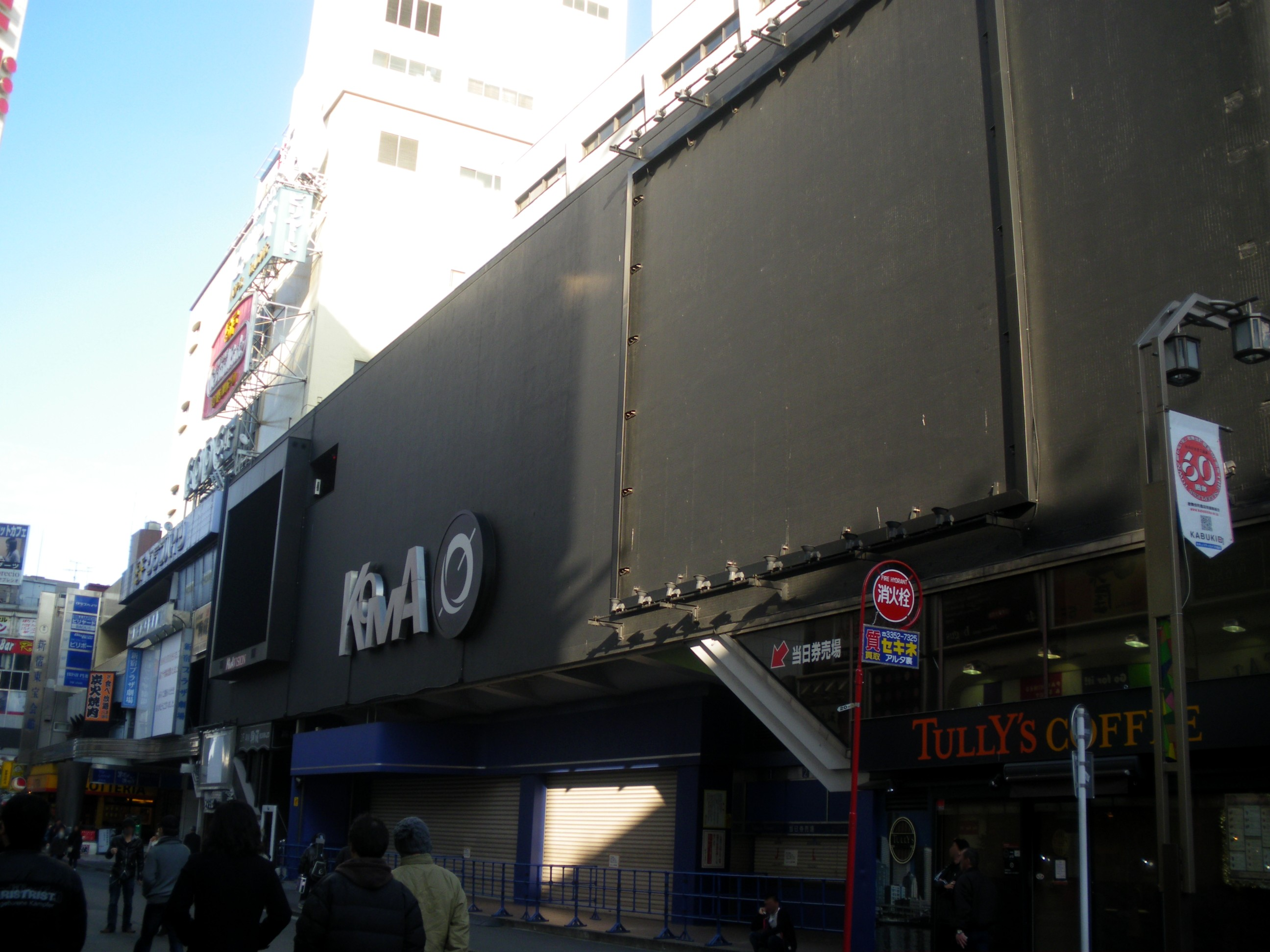
- Interactive map of Shinjuku Koma Theater
- Location: Kabukichō Shinjuku, Tokyo, Japan
- Owner: Toho
- Seating type: Reserved
- Capacity: 2,088
- Type: Indoor theatre

Construction
- Opened: 1956
- Expanded: 2005
- Closed: 2008
- Demolished: 2009

The Shinjuku Koma Theater (新宿コマ劇場, Shinjuku Koma Gekijō) was a major theatre in the Kabukichō, Shinjuku, Tokyo. The theatre opened in 1956 and it had a capacity of 2,088 seats. It was demolished in 2009. The Shinjuku Toho Building stands on the site of the theater.

== Past shows ==
- Kōhaku Uta Gassen (1958)
- Saburō Kitajima
- Ken Matsudaira
- Hibari Misora
- Kiyoshi Hikawa
- Sachiko Kobayashi
- Nana Mizuki (2008)
- Momoe in Koma (1977)
- Kasou Taishou (1979)
- Annie Get Your Gun
- How to Succeed in Business Without Really Trying
- South Pacific
- Peter Pan
- We Will Rock You

Preceded by Tokyo Takarazuka Theater	Host of the Kōhaku Uta Gassen; 1958	Succeeded by Tokyo Takarazuka Theater
