= Bleach: Thousand-Year Blood War =

Japanese anime television series

- BLEACH 千年血戦篇; Burīchi: Sennen Kessen-hen
- Also known as: List: Bleach: The Blood Warfare (alternate series title); Bleach: Thousand-Year Blood War – The Separation (P2); Bleach: Thousand-Year Blood War – The Conflict (P3); Bleach: Thousand-Year Blood War – The Calamity (P4)
- Type: TV series
- Genre: Adventure; Martial arts; Supernatural
- Based on: Bleach (Note: Specifically, chapters 480–686)
- Created by: Tite Kubo
- Directed by: Tomohisa Taguchi (Note: Director (監督) for Parts 1–2 and Chief Director (総監督) for Parts 3–4); Hikaru Murata (Note: Chief Episode Director (チーフ演出) for Parts 1–2 and Director (監督) for Parts 3–4); Mitsutoshi Satō (P1–2) (Note: Chief Episode Director (チーフ演出)); Chen Dali (P3)
- Series composition: Tomohisa Taguchi; Masaki Hiramatsu
- Character designer: Masashi Kudo
- Music by: Shirō Sagisu
- Voices of: Masakazu Morita; Noriaki Sugiyama; Yuki Matsuoka; Hiroki Yasumoto; Fumiko Orikasa; Kentarō Itō; Takayuki Sugō; Yūichirō Umehara
- No. of episodes: 50

Production
- Art director: Yoshio Tanioka
- Sound director: Yukio Nagasaki
- Cinematographers: Kazuhiro Yamada; Satomi Okuhara (P4)
- Color designer: Saori Gōda
- CG directors: Toshihiro Sasaki; Kazushi Goto (P1–3); Takahiro Suzuki (P4)
- Editor: Akinori Mishima
- Animation producers: Wataru Hamamoto (P1); Azusa Hirayama (P2–3)
- Studios: Studio Pierrot (P1–2); Pierrot Films (P3–4)
- Producers: List: Makoto Hijikata; Yoshihiko Tominaga; Genki Negishi (P1–2); Tasuku Honda (P1–2); Akari Yanagawa (P3); Momoko Asahara (P3–4); Atsushi Hasegawa (P4); Azusa Hirayama (P4)
- Production companies: Shueisha; TV Tokyo; Dentsu; Pierrot
- Runtime: 24–27 minutes

Original release
- Network: TV Tokyo
- Release: October 11, 2022 – October 27, 2026

Related
- Bleach (2004–2012)

Bleach: Thousand-Year Blood War (Japanese: BLEACH 千年血戦篇, Hepburn: Burīchi: Sennen Kessen-hen), also known as Bleach: The Blood Warfare, is a Japanese anime television series based on Tite Kubo's manga series Bleach and a direct follow-up to the original Bleach anime series, which itself ran from October 2004 to March 2012. Like its predecessor, the sequel series was animated by Studio Pierrot (Note: Studio Pierrot proper for Parts 1–2 and Pierrot Films for Parts 3–4) and directed by Tomohisa Taguchi and Hikaru Murata, with series composition by the former listed director and Masaki Hiramatsu. Unlike the original anime series, which was produced during the manga's ongoing publication, series author Tite Kubo served as general supervisor for the adaptation.

The series aired on TV Tokyo and its TXN affiliates from October 11, 2022, to October 27, 2026, and ran for four cours, with off-season breaks in between, totaling 50 episodes. The first 13-episode cours, subtitled The Blood Warfare, aired from October to December 2022. The second 13-episode cours, subtitled The Separation, aired from July to September 2023. The third 14-episode cours, subtitled The Conflict, aired from October to December 2024. The fourth and final 10-episode cours, subtitled The Calamity, aired from July to October 2026.

The series has been licensed by Viz Media, which has made it available for streaming on Hulu in the United States and on Disney+ internationally outside of Asia. The English dub of the series made its broadcast syndication debut in the United States on Adult Swim's Toonami programming block on May 18, 2025.

== Plot ==
The series follows Ichigo Kurosaki and the Soul Reapers of the Soul Society as they face a new enemy. When the Wandenreich, a Quincy organization led by their king, Yhwach, declares war on the Soul Society, Ichigo and his allies become embroiled in a conflict that endangers both the human world and the Soul Society. This war forces Ichigo and the Soul Reapers to confront the Quincies' long-hidden history, the origins of their powers, and the events that led to the centuries-old conflict between the two groups.

== Voice cast and characters ==
Character	Japanese	English
Ichigo Kurosaki	Masakazu Morita	Johnny Yong Bosch
Uryū Ishida	Noriaki Sugiyama	Derek Stephen Prince
Orihime Inoue	Yuki Matsuoka	Stephanie Sheh
Rukia Kuchiki	Fumiko Orikasa	Michelle Ruff
Renji Abarai	Kentarō Itō	Wally Wingert
Yasutora "Chad" Sado	Hiroki Yasumoto	Alain Mesa
Yhwach	Takayuki Sugō	Richard Epcar
Jugram Haschwalth	Yūichirō Umehara	Robbie Daymond
Shunsui Kyōraku	Akio Otsuka	Steve Kramer
Byakuya Kuchiki	Ryōtarō Okiayu	Daniel Woren
Tōshirō Hitsugaya	Romi Park	Steve Staley
Kenpachi Zaraki	Fumihiko Tachiki	Patrick Seitz
Kisuke Urahara	Shin'ichirō Miki	Doug Erholtz
Yoruichi Shihōin	Satsuki Yukino	Wendee Lee
Mayuri Kurotsuchi	Ryūsei Nakao	Terrence Stone
Ganju Shiba	Wataru Takagi	Kyle Hebert
Shinji Hirako	Masaya Onosaka	Aleks Le
Akon	Keijin Okuda	Gavin Harrison
Nanao Ise	Hitomi Nabatame	Kate Higgins
Ichibe Hyōsube	Naomi Kusumi	Aaron LaPlante
Lille Barro	Satoshi Hino	Evan Michael Lee
Askin Nakk Le Vaar	Shunsuke Takeuchi	Daman Mills
Gerard Valkyrie	Tsuyoshi Koyama	Dave B. Mitchell

== Production ==
In March 2020, as part of the Bleach 20th Anniversary Project, it was announced that the remainder of Tite Kubo's Bleach manga, beginning with the "Thousand-Year Blood War" arc, would receive an anime adaptation. The first teaser trailer and key visual were unveiled at Jump Festa in December 2021, alongside the principal staff. Tomohisa Taguchi was appointed director and series composer, with Masashi Kudo returning as character designer, Shirō Sagisu returning to compose the music, and Studio Pierrot producing the animation. Kubo is credited on the series as the creator of the original work and general supervisor.

Series composition writer Masaki Hiramatsu described adapting the manga as a form of "translation", noting that the pacing of a weekly manga differs from that of a television episode. Major changes and material not depicted in the manga were discussed with Tite Kubo, who supervised revised and original scenes and could request changes of his own. Hiramatsu cited the sixth episode's meeting between Sōsuke Aizen and Yhwach as an example, with Kubo substantially rewriting the dialogue for the expanded anime scene.

The amount of anime-original material increased as production continued. For the second cours, the staff stated that original scenes were first proposed by the animation team and then submitted to Kubo, who sometimes returned rough manga-style storyboards to clarify his ideas. The additions ranged from extra dialogue and explanatory material to scenes not depicted in the manga. Kubo said that, for an original battle in the second cours that he had been unable to depict in the manga, he supplied the production staff with approximately five or six pages of illustrations showing the characters' movements, transitions and fighting sequence. By production of the second cours, Kubo was also attending most recording sessions in person and provided direction or clarification to the voice cast when necessary.

For the third cours, The Conflict, Taguchi became chief series director while Hikaru Murata became series director, with animation production credited to Pierrot Films. Taguchi supervised the overall scripts and storyboards, while Murata oversaw individual episode direction and production meetings. Taguchi stated that the staff's working relationship with Kubo had become closer over the first two cours, making it easier to consult him about newly created scenes. Murata said that The Conflict contained more anime-original material than the preceding cours, with the additional material produced under Kubo's supervision and designed to connect back into the manga's storyline. Taguchi and Murata retained their respective positions for the fourth and final cours, The Calamity, with Pierrot Films continuing as the animation studio.

== Release ==
The series premiered on TV Tokyo and its TXN affiliates on October 11, 2022. (Note: TV Tokyo listed the first cours as airing on Monday at 24:00, which is effectively Tuesday at midnight JST.) It ran for four cours with off-season breaks in between. The first cours, subtitled The Blood Warfare, consists of 13 episodes and ended on December 27 of that same year. (Note: The first cours' finale aired as a one-hour special, with the 12th and 13th episodes premiering back-to-back.) The second cours, subtitled The Separation (訣別譚, Ketsubetsu-tan), also consists of 13 episodes and was broadcast from July 8 to September 30, 2023. (Note: The second cours' finale aired as a one-hour special, with the 25th and 26th episodes premiering back-to-back.) The third cours, subtitled The Conflict (相剋譚, Sōkoku-tan), consisting of 14 episodes, aired from October 5 to December 28, 2024. (Note: The third cours' finale was a one-hour special, with the 39th and 40th episodes premiering back-to-back.) The fourth and final cours, subtitled The Calamity (禍進譚, Kashin-tan), consisting of 10 episodes, aired from July 25 to October 27, 2026.

In October 2022, Viz Media announced that the series would stream on Hulu in the United States and Disney+ internationally outside of Asia. The English dub of the series began streaming on Hulu in November of the same year. In April 2025, it was announced that the English dub would make its broadcast television premiere on Adult Swim's Toonami programming block beginning on May 18, 2025. The first three episodes of The Calamity were screened in US theaters, in Japanese with English subtitles and with the English dub, from June 25–29, 2026, ahead of its July premiere. The episodes were screened alongside an exclusive behind-the-scenes conversation with manga author Tite Kubo, chief series director Tomohisa Taguchi, and series director Hikaru Murata. In Australia, the first three episodes of The Calamity were screened at theaters through Sugoi Co at a special premiere event on June 22, 2026, prior to a nationwide theatrical release on June 25.

== Music ==
The music for Bleach: Thousand-Year Blood War was composed by Shirō Sagisu, who also composed the score for the original Bleach anime. The soundtrack albums include TV Animation Bleach The Blood Warfare Original Soundtrack I, released in 2023, and subsequent releases covering the later parts of the series.

For The Blood Warfare cours, the opening theme song is "Scar" (スカー, Sukā), performed by Tatsuya Kitani, while the ending theme song is "Saihate" (最果て; lit. 'The Farthest Reaches'), performed by SennaRin; in addition, Kitani also performed the special ending theme song for the first episode, "Rapport", which was previously used as the theme song for the series's 20th anniversary exhibition, Bleach EX. For The Separation cours, the opening theme song is "Stars", performed by w.o.d., while the ending theme song is "Endroll", performed by Yoh Kamiyama. For The Conflict cours, the opening theme song is "Kotoba ni Sezu Tomo" (言葉にせずとも; lit. 'Even Without Saying a Word'), performed by Six Lounge, while the ending theme song is "Monochrome", performed by Suisoh. For The Calamity cours, the opening theme song is "I-Bull", performed by Jo0ji, while the ending theme song is "Rasen" (螺旋; lit. 'Spiral'), performed by 9Lana.

== Episodes ==
Part	Episodes	Originally released	
Part	Episodes	First released	Last released
1	13	October 11, 2022	December 27, 2022
2	13	July 8, 2023	September 30, 2023
3	14	October 5, 2024	December 28, 2024
4	10	July 25, 2026	October 27, 2026

=== Part 1: The Blood Warfare (2022) ===
No. overall (Note: Episode number continuing from the previous anime series, which is based on the same manga)	No. in series (Note: Episode number within the Thousand-Year Blood War anime series)	Title	Directed by	Written by	Storyboarded by	Chief animation directed by	Original release date	English air date
367	1	"The Blood Warfare" (Note: Stylized in all caps)	Hikaru Murata	Tomohisa Taguchi	Tomohisa Taguchi	Masashi Kudo	October 11, 2022	May 18, 2025
Soul Reapers Ryūnosuke Yuki and Shino Madarame arrive and visit Karakura Town, following the mass disappearances of Hollows from the World of the Living. They are ambushed by Hollows, but rescued by Ichigo Kurosaki, Orihime Inoue, Yasutora Sado, and Uryū Ishida. Two days later, Ichigo meets Asguiaro Ebern, a member of the Wandenreich. Ebern attempts to use a Quincy medallion and seal Ichigo's Bankai, but he destroys it and makes him retreat. At the same time, a group of individuals representing the enemy faction called the Wandenreich, the Quincy Empire, infiltrate head captain Genryūsai Shigekuni Yamamoto's office in the Soul Society, and deliver the dying lieutenant Chōjirō Sasakibe as an example for the impending fate of the Soul Reapers. Meanwhile, Squad 11 members Ikkaku Madarame and Yumichika Ayasegawa, investigate the disappearances of thousands of civilians from the Rukon District. At the Wandenreich's base Silbern, Ebern reports to Yhwach, the Quincy King.
368	2	"Foundation Stones"	Mitsutoshi Satō	Tomohisa Taguchi	Tomohisa Taguchi	Michio Hasegawa	October 18, 2022	May 25, 2025
Nelliel Tu Odelschwanck and Pesche Guatiche go to the World of the Living, and inform Ichigo that Hueco Mundo has been invaded by the Wandenreich, after its leader Tier Halibel, the former 3rd Espada, was defeated by Yhwach. The Arrancars of Hueco Mundo have either joined the Quincies, been captured, or killed. Kisuke Urahara, Ichigo, Orihime, Chad, Nel, and Pesche, arrive to Hueco Mundo. Meanwhile, the Wandenreich's hunting captain of the First Jagdarmee, Stern Ritter "J" Quilge Opie, tests the Arrancars to see who will join them. Loly and Menoly attempt to take an upper hand, but are dispatched easily. Tres Bestias: Emilou Apacci, Franceska Mila Rose, and Cyan Sung-Sun arrive for support, but are overwhelmed by Quilge. Meanwhile in the Soul Society, a captains meeting is held where Squad 12 captain Mayuri Kurotsuchi says the Wandenreich are in fact an army of Quincies.
369	3	"March of the StarCross"	Hodaka Kuramoto	Tomohisa Taguchi	Hikaru Yamaguchi	Kumiko Takayanagi	October 25, 2022	June 1, 2025
Ichigo confronts Quilge. The Tres Bestias summon Ayon and re-join the fight against Quilge. Uryū learns the truth of the conflict between Soul Reapers and Quincies centuries ago. It is revealed that Mayuri ordered the removal of all civilians from the Rukon District, in order to rectify the soul imbalance caused by the Quincies exterminating Hollows in the Living World. It is revealed that Yamamoto fought Yhwach 1,000 years ago. Quilge absorbs Reishi in the area (including from Ayon) and overpowers the Tres Bestias, but clashes with Ichigo once again when he activates his Bankai. When the Quincies begin their invasion of the Soul Society, Stern Ritter "H" " Bazz-B seemingly kills Squad 3 Lieutenant Izuru Kira among several other Soul Reapers.
370	4	"Kill the Shadow" (Note: Stylized in start case)	Hikaru Murata	Tomohisa Taguchi	Hikaru Murata	Kiyoshi Komatsubara	November 1, 2022	June 8, 2025
Over a thousand Soul Reapers die within seven minutes of the Quincy's invasion. Squad 3 captain Rōjūrō "Rose" Ōtoribashi meets Stern Ritter "U" NaNaNa Najahkoop, Squad 2 captain Soi-Fon engages Stern Ritter "K" BG9 in battle, Squad 6 captain Byakuya Kuchiki and lieutenant Renji Abarai face off against Stern Ritter "F" Äs Nödt and Stern Ritter "S" Mask De Masculine, Squad 7 captain Sajin Komamura encounters Stern Ritter "E" Bambietta Basterbine and Squad 10 captain Tōshirō Hitsugaya engages Stern Ritter "I" Cang Du. As the fighting reaches a stalemate, Soi-Fon, Byakuya, Komamura and Hitsugaya release their Bankais, but they are stolen by their opponent Stern Ritters using medallions which absorb them. The captains are shocked by the news that the Stern Ritters' trump card is to steal Bankais, as it is communicated to the rest of the Soul Society. Squad 8 captain, Shunsui Kyōraku is blinded in his right eye by Stern Ritter "N" Robert Accutrone. While Quilge fights against Ichigo, Urahara observes that the Stern Ritters failed to steal Ichigo's Bankai. Urahara opens the portal for Ichigo to enter and join the ongoing battle. However, Quilge suddenly attacks Urahara, Orihime, and Chad, and uses his Stern Ritter ability, "The Jail", to trap Ichigo in the Garganta and prevent him from reaching the Soul Society.
371	5	"Wrath as a Lightning"	Mitsutoshi Satō	Masaki Hiramatsu	Mitsutoshi Satō	Michio Hasegawa	November 8, 2022	June 15, 2025
Ichigo hears the voices of many Soul Reapers, while desperately attempting to escape from Quilge's Jail. Before Quilge can kill Urahrara and the others, he is ambushed and killed by an unseen assailant. Byakuya and Renji engage Äs Nödt in battle. Byakuya is unnerved by Äs Nödt, who awakened his fears with Reishi Thorns. Byakuya attempts to overcome his fear, but Äs Nödt overwhelms him with his own Bankai. Rukia and Renji are wounded by other Stern Ritters. Kenpachi Zaraki, having killed three of them (Stern Ritter "R" Jerome Guizbatt, Stern Ritter "Q" Berenice Gabrielli, and Stern Ritter "Y" Loyd Lloyd), confronts Yhwach and his right-hand man, Jugram Haschwalth. Yamamoto saves Squad 9 lieutenant Shūhei Hisagi from Stern Ritter "O", Driscoll Berci. He reveals that he killed Sasakibe and stole his Bankai, Kōkō Gonryō Rikyū, with which he attacks Yamamoto. This reminds Yamamoto that he taught Sasakibe 2,000 years ago. The enraged Yamamoto kills Driscoll, saves Kenpachi from Yhwach, and inspires the Soul Reapers to keep fighting.
372	6	"The Fire"	Ema Saito	Masaki Hiramatsu	Tomohisa Taguchi	N/A	November 15, 2022	June 22, 2025
Yamamoto engages Yhwach in battle at the Seireitei. When Yhwach moves away, Yamamoto activates his Bankai, Zanka no Tachi, which causes water to evaporate from the whole area. Squad 4 captain Retsu Unohana and her lieutenant Isane Kotetsu, are worried that if the battle goes on for too long, Yamamoto could destroy even the Soul Society. Yhwach is powerless against the various abilities of Zanka no Tachi, and Yamamoto boasts that his Bankai is too strong to be stolen. Yamamoto unknowingly defeats a fake replica, and the real Yhwach arrives and identifies him as the second half of the Lloyd twins, Stern Ritter "Y" Royd Lloyd. Yhwach destroys the Squad 1 barracks and kills Royd for his failure. Yhwach reveals he had visited Sousuke Aizen in his underground prison. Considered by the Wandenreich to be one of the Five Special War Powers, Yhwach tried to convince Aizen to join him, but he refused. Yamamoto attempts to use his Bankai again, but Yhwach steals it, being the only one to take it, and kills Yamamoto.
373	7	"Born in the Dark"	Shinichirō Ueda	Masaki Hiramatsu	Toshiyuki Tsuru	Kumiko Takayanagi	November 22, 2022	June 29, 2025
A thousand years ago, the original Thirteen Court Guard Squads consisted of ruthless and barbaric killers with selfish purpose, who partook in killing the Wandenreich, and Yamamoto and Sasakibe defeated Yhwach. Afterwards, Yamamoto adopted a peaceful philosophy and formed a unified Court Guard system. Back in the present day, Yhwach destroys Yamamoto's remains. Ichigo breaks free and returns to the Soul Society for help. He trades blows with Yhwach, but is quickly defeated. Yhwach attempts to kill Ichigo, but is countered by him awakening a defensive Quincy technique called Blut Vëne. Yhwach reveals Quilge's Jail can only be broken by a Quincy, but Ichigo does not know the truth about himself or his mother, Masaki. Shadow portals appear to transport the Quincy back to Silbern and Yhwach realizes that Aizen used his Shikai ability on him to lose track of time. Ichigo tries to charge at Yhwach, but his Zanpakutō is destroyed by Haschwalth. Yhwach departs, cryptically referring to the stunned Ichigo as "his son, born in the dark".
374	8	"The Shooting Star Project (Zero Mix)" (Note: Stylized as "The Shooting Star Project (ZERO MIX)")	Young-Hoon Jung	Masaki Hiramatsu	Shinji Itadaki	Kiyoshi Komatsubara	November 29, 2022	July 20, 2025
After the invasion, Rukia, Renji, and Kenpachi are treated by Squad 4, along with the surviving Soul Reapers as Byakuya barely clings to life. Mayuri tells Ichigo that as his Zanpakutō was destroyed while in Bankai state, it cannot be fixed. The captains mourn Yamamoto. Ichigo and the captains meet with Squad 0, consisting of the five most elite former captains, who protect the Soul King in the Royal Palace. Ichigo and the captains, talk to Urahara, Orihime, and Chad, who were saved from Quilge by a concealed Grimmjow Jaegerjaquez. Kūkaku Shiba sends Ichigo, Byakuya, Renji, Rukia, and Squad 0 to the Royal Palace above the Seireitei, where Zangetsu could be reforged. Kūkaku, having sent them up to the Royal Palace, joins her brother Ganju, Kūgo Ginjō, Shūkurō Tsukishima, and Giriko Kutsuzawa, who now reside in the Soul Society, since they were killed with a Zanpakutō, given a proper burial, and did not become Hollows. At the Royal Palace, Ichigo, Rukia, Renji, and Byakuya, are being healed by Tenjirō Kirinji, a member of Squad 0 and the one who taught Unohana healing techniques. The Soul King is seen awakening.
375	9	"The Drop"	Kaito Asakura	Masaki Hiramatsu	Kaito Asakura	Michio Hasegawa	December 6, 2022	July 27, 2025
Ichigo and Renji are healed completely by Kirinji. They move up to Kirio Hikifune's palace, where she feeds them with ancient Soul Society dishes, containing strong spiritual pressure, before being sent up to Ōetsu Nimaiya's palace, the man responsible for creating all Zanpakutō. Meanwhile, Squad 8 captain Shunsui Kyōraku is appointed to be head captain, his lieutenant Nanao Ise have joined the Squad 1 and Yamamoto's previous 3rd Seat Genshirō Okikiba, was also promoted to lieutenant. He decrees that Kenpachi is to be taught "zanjutsu", an all-style encompassing swordsmanship by Squad 4 captain Unohana, who reveals herself a criminal for the history of the Soul Society and the founder of the Squad 11 and the "First Kenpachi", her real name being Yachiru Unohana. Unohana and Kenpachi fight at the underground prison, Muken. Kenpachi recalls how he used to admire Unohana, from their first meeting on, when he scarred her chest and she scared his face. Unohana states that he has become far weaker since then and she will push him to the brink of death and revive him repeatedly to unlock his full potential.
376	10	"The Battle"	Hikaru Murata	Masaki Hiramatsu	Hikaru Murata	Kumiko Takayanagi	December 13, 2022	August 3, 2025
Hundreds of years ago, Unohana, weary of fighting bandits, sought a true challenge until she encountered the fierce child Kenpachi. Though she was initially overpowered, Kenpachi subconsciously restrained himself, leading to his defeat. In the present, their battle resumes as Unohana repeatedly wounds Kenpachi, each death and revival sharpening his strength. She unleashes her Bankai, Minazuki, transforming her blade into streams of acidic blood-like slashes. Ultimately, Kenpachi grows strong enough to withstand her attacks and strikes the killing blow. As Unohana dies, he mourns her loss but finally awakens his own Zanpakutō, forging the bond he had long lacked. Meanwhile, Ichigo, Renji, and Kon arrive at Nimaiya's palace, Hoohden, where they encounter Zanpakutō spirits and the eccentric creator of the blades himself. Nimaiya explains the origin of Zanpakutō: Soul Reapers are first given a nameless Asauchi, which gradually evolve into their personalized weapon as they imprint their spiritual essence upon it. To prove themselves, Renji and Ichigo are cast into a pit swarming with countless Asauchi and given a three day endurance test. Renji successfully bonds with his weapon. However, Ichigo fails the test and Nimaiya abruptly sends him back to the World of the Living so he can rediscover his origins.
377	11	"Everything But the Rain"	Yusaku Kikuchi	Masaki Hiramatsu	Mitsutoshi Satō	Kiyoshi Komatsubara	December 20, 2022	August 10, 2025
Nimaiya tells Renji that he forged every Zanpakutō over the past several thousand years, including Kenpachi's, which was taken from a dead Soul Reaper. However, Ichigo's Zanpakutō was not one of his Asauchi, making his training crucial. Ichigo visits Ikumi Unagiya, but is taken away by his father, Isshin, in Soul Reaper form, leaving his badge behind. Isshin reveals that Ichigo's mother, Masaki, was a Quincy. Nearly 20 years ago, as captain of Squad 10, Isshin investigated Soul Reaper deaths in Naraki City caused by a powerful Hollow named "White", created from multiple dead Soul Reapers' souls. Masaki, an Echt Quincy raised by Sōken Ishida's family, sensed the Hollow's presence and intervened despite protests from Ryūken and the family maid Kanae Katagiri. While battling the Hollow, Isshin was ambushed and wounded by Aizen, Gin Ichimaru, and Kaname Tōsen, who had created "White". Masaki saved Isshin, defeating the Hollow at the cost of triggering its self-destruction. Isshin protected her and learned she was a Quincy. Fearing rejection, Masaki was relieved when Isshin warmly accepted her. Ryūken and Kanae, seeing she was safe, left her. Back in the present day, Haschwalth meets Uryū.
378	12	"Everything But the Rain "June Truth"" (Note: Stylized as "EVERYTHING BUT THE RAIN “June Truth”")	Young-Hoon Jung	Masaki Hiramatsu	Shinji Itadaki & Kentarō Tokiwa	Michio Hasegawa	December 27, 2022	August 17, 2025
Isshin continues telling Ichigo his story. After the mission, he reported to Yamamoto but left out Masaki's involvement. Drawn to her, he continued patrolling the World of the Living. Meanwhile, Masaki began feeling the effects of the Hollow soul that had merged with her, collapsing as a Hollow hole appeared on her chest. Berated by Ryūken's mother for helping a Soul Reaper, Masaki was taken for help by Ryūken, who blamed Isshin for her condition. Urahara intervened, explaining he discovered a cure during his hundred-year exile while studying the Visoreds. Unlike Soul Reapers, Quincies lack resistance to Hollow souls, so Masaki's powerful Quincy soul needed the presence of a full Soul Reaper's powers to stabilize her for life. Isshin volunteered, and Urahara gave him a special Gigai to seal his powers and make him human. Isshin and Masaki later fell in love, while Ryūken married Kanae. Isshin reveals the reason that Masaki died saving Ichigo from Grand Fisher, and Kanae Katagiri died from her illness, was because of Yhwach, who nine years earlier used Auswählen to absorb the powers of Quincies he deemed to be impure. Before leaving, Ichigo retrieves his badge from Ikumi.
379	13	"The Blade Is Me"	Tomohisa Taguchi, Mitsutoshi Satō & Yoshinori Odaka	Masaki Hiramatsu	Tomohisa Taguchi	Kumiko Takayanagi	December 27, 2022	August 24, 2025
Ichigo is guided back to the Royal Palace by one of Nimaiya's Zanpakutō bodyguards. There, all the Asauchi kneel before him, and he chooses the correct one: "White", the Hollow that has always resided within him. Meanwhile, in Soul Society, preparations for the next battle intensify. Hitsugaya returns to train in swordsmanship, determined to improve. Kensei Muguruma assigns unofficial lieutenant Mashiro Kuna to train under Hisagi, pushing him toward awakening his Bankai. Akon, recovering from injuries, discovers that Mayuri and Nemu Kurotsuchi have sealed themselves inside the lab, pursuing a mysterious project. Elsewhere, Komamura seeks his clan elder to learn a secret technique, while Soi-Fon sharpens her skills through solitary training in the mountains. Back at the palace, Nimaiya forges Ichigo's Zanpakutō, revealing the truth: "White" is the true Zangetsu, while "Old Man Zangetsu" is the embodiment of his Quincy powers who resembles Yhwach from a thousand years ago. Zangetsu explains that he suppressed Ichigo's true full Soul Reaper strength to protect him and finally releases his control on it, proud of Ichigo's growth. Ichigo embraces both embodiments, manifesting his new dual-bladed Shikai. In Silbern, Haschwalth presents Uryū, wearing the Stern Ritter attire, to Yhwach.

=== Part 2: The Separation (2023) ===
No. overall	No. in series	Title	Directed by	Written by	Storyboarded by	Chief animation directed by	Original release date	English air date
380	14	"The Last 9 Days" (Note: Stylized as "THE LAST 9DAYS")	Hikaru Murata	Masaki Hiramatsu	Tomohisa Taguchi, Hikaru Murata & Yusaku Kikuchi	Kiyoshi Komatsubara	July 8, 2023	August 31, 2025
Ichigo begins his training with Ichibe Hyōsube, the captain of Squad 0. Meanwhile, Yhwach gathers the Quincy army to announce that he has chosen Uryū as his successor, causing discord between many of the Stern Ritters who considered Haschwalth more worthy for the post. Askin Nakk Le Vaar stops the ruckus between other ones, specifically Bazz-B and Haschwalth. Orihime and Chad train at Hueco Mundo, while Urahara researches the Quincy Medallion. Ichibe leads Ichigo to a special place in the Royal Palace, which can only be accessed with permission from the Soul King, in order to make him stronger. New Head Captain Shunsui Kyōraku gives Ichigo's human friends a Soul Ticket into the Soul Society in case Ichigo's spiritual pressure becomes too much for the World of the Living to bear. Rukia and Renji continue their training in the Royal Palace, while Byakuya recovers with Kirinji's help. A dark dome engulfs the Seireitei and the Quincy army returns for the next battle. Yhwach declares that he will retake the world in the next nine days, as per the Quincy Song, the Kaiser Gesang.
381	15	"Peace from Shadows"	Yusaku Kikuchi	Masaki Hiramatsu	Shinji Itadaki	Michio Hasegawa	July 15, 2023	September 7, 2025
The Wandenreich launch their second invasion of the Seireitei. Haschwalth orders the Stern Ritters who stole Bankai to defeat their respective robbed captains. In Squad 12, Askin confronts its members and explains that the Wandenreich fortress was forged from Quincy powers and exists hidden within the Seireitei's shadows, where the Quincies observed and studied them. Mayuri and Nemu emerge from his personal lab, now lit in constant brightness, where Mayuri crafted countermeasures against Quincy techniques. Irritated by Mayuri's persistence, Askin withdraws. Elsewhere, Haschwalth confronts Shunsui and Nanao, only for Nanao to halt him with a high-level Kido. Across the Seireitei, chaos erupts as Soul Reapers clash with Soldat troops. Squad 10's Toshiro Hitsugaya and Rangiku Matsumoto face Bazz-B. Meanwhile, Squad 2 lieutenant Marechiyo Ōmaeda shields his sister from BG9 until captain Soi Fon intervenes. Hitsugaya and Rangiku attempt coordinated tactics, but Bazz-B overwhelms them with ease. Before Hitsugaya can recover from Bazz-B's assault, Cang Du intervenes and prepares to finish Hitsugaya off with his own Bankai. At the same time, BG9 gravely wounds Soi Fon. Just as hope seems lost, Urahara contacts Mayuri, announcing he has discovered a way to reclaim the stolen Bankai.
382	16	"The Fundamental Virulence"	Ōri Yasukawa	Masaki Hiramatsu	Yōichi Fujita	Kumiko Takayanagi	July 22, 2023	September 14, 2025
Cang Du has already defeated Rangiku and moves to finish off Hitsugaya. Urahara informs Mayuri he has created the Shin'eiyaku: a black pill that hollowfies Bankai, rendering them poisonous to Quincies. He discovered this weakness after Quilge's inability to properly control Arrancar Reishi. The pills are distributed to all captains and several lieutenants. Hitsugaya takes the pill, activating his hollowfied Bankai, and freezes Cang Du. BG9 attempts to harvest the unconscious Soi-Fon, but Ōmaeda gives her the pill, enabling her to unleash her Bankai to eliminate BG9. Squad 5 captain Shinji Hirako activates his Bankai, Sakashima Yokoshima Happō Fusagari, causing enemies and allies alike to get confused and making the Soldats kill each other. Yumichika, Hisagi, and Ikkaku ingest the Shin'eiyaku, and are ambushed by Mask de Masculine, who easily overwhelms them. Elsewhere, Bambietta Basterbine seeks captain Komamura. Komamura, clad in full armor, arrives to stop her. Shinji briefly stalls her with his Shikai to allow Komamura to pursue his mission of avenging Yamamoto. All fallen Stern Ritters begin activating their Vollständig. Meanwhile, Ichigo enters a dark corridor in the Soul Palace, facing crushing pressure, pain, and visions that gradually reveal the Soul King.
383	17	"Heart of Wolf" (Note: Stylized as "HEART of WOLF")	Shinichirō Ueda	Masaki Hiramatsu	Shinichirō Ueda	Kiyoshi Komatsubara	July 29, 2023	September 21, 2025
Bambietta activates her Vollständig and blows Shinji up, forcing Komamura and Squad 5 lieutenant Momo Hinamori to intervene. While Momo retreats with Shinji, Komamura shields them. Bambietta reveals her power is not conventional bombs, but the ability to make anything struck by her Reishi projectiles explode. She blasts apart Komamura's helmet, exposing his new human appearance. Komamura explains that he sacrificed his own heart to his clan elder, gaining the secret Jinka Technique. In this temporary form, he is immortal and impervious to harm. Summoning his Bankai, now unarmored and invulnerable, Komamura drives Bambietta back by deflecting her projectiles and defeats her. Komamura immediately rushes toward Yhwach, but his heart fails and he is reduced to a pure wolf form. His lieutenant, Tetsuzaemon Iba, carries him away. A gravely injured Bambietta is discovered by her close Sternritter friends. Meanwhile, Uryū gathers the fallen Cang Du and BG9, while Haschwalth returns to Yhwach's side. Mask de Masculine defeats his opponents with James' support until stopped by Squad 9 captain Kensei Muguruma and Squad 3 captain Rōjūrō "Rose" Ōtoribashi. Elsewhere, Ichigo witnesses the Soul Society's past through the Soul King's powers and passes through the corridor gate, arriving at Senjumaru Shutara's palace.
384	18	"Rages at Ringside"	Itoko Nagai	Masaki Hiramatsu	Atsushi Wakabayashi	Kumiko Takayanagi	August 5, 2023	September 28, 2025
Shunsui orders the remaining Soul Reapers to regroup under Mayuri's advise. Kensei unleashes his Bankai, Tekken Tachikaze, against Mask de Masculine and briefly overwhelms him, but Mask quickly recovers thanks to James' cheers and critically wounds him. Hisagi warns that James is the source of Mask's strength, so Rose slices him in half and activates his Bankai, Kinshara Butōdan, producing illusions through music. Mask counters this by rupturing his eardrums and defeats Rose. As Mask moves to finish Rose off, Renji arrives and blocks his blow. Rukia follows, revealing that both have completed Squad 0's training. She evacuates the injured captains to Kotetsu for healing as Renji battles Mask. James survives his injury and continues empowering Mask, who triggers his Vollständig and fires a massive Reishi blast at Renji that incinerates James. Renji withstands Mask's attack with his True Bankai, Sō-ō Zabimaru, which he can now properly wield after previously being given its false name. He counters with Zāgā Tēppō, turning Mask into ash. Inside Silbern, Yhwach absorbs Mask's Reishi before vanishing into a shadow, leaving Haschwalth behind. Haschwalth tells Uryū that all Quincies are bound to Yhwach, and as his heir, he should be told the truth about him.
385	19	"The White Haze"	Dali Chen	Masaki Hiramatsu	Tomohisa Taguchi & Shinji Itadaki	Michio Hasegawa	August 12, 2023	October 5, 2025
After completing training with Squad 0, Ichigo begins descending towards the Seireitei and informs Urahara. Uryū witnesses Haschwalth executing BG9 and Cang Du for failing in their battles. Haschwalth reveals that all those who are given a portion of Yhwach's soul have their powers, knowledge, and skills absorbed by Yhwach upon dying. As Rukia scouts around the Seireitei, she is confronted by Äs Nödt, who is looking for Byakuya. Since Rukia is now much stronger and has learned about her Zanpakutō's true abilities, particularly its ability to lower the user's temperature and anything they touch to absolute zero, she manages to freeze Äs Nödt. Angered by Rukia's suggestion that he is afraid, Äs Nödt activates his Vollständig and begins instilling fear via Rukia's optic nerves. While trapped inside a moment of absolute fear, Byakuya rescues Rukia and recognizes her growth. Äs Nödt taunts Byakuya, but he allows Rukia to finish him off by herself. Rukia unleashes her dangerous Bankai, Hakka no Togame, to defeat Äs Nödt. Byakuya helps Rukia control her Bankai so that she will not die from it. Elsewhere while tending to Rose and Kensei, Isane and Squad 11 lieutenant Yachiru Kusajishi are ambushed by a Stern Ritter.
386	20	"I Am the Edge"	Yusaku Kikuchi	Masaki Hiramatsu	Wataru Yamamoto	Kiyoshi Komatsubara	August 19, 2023	October 12, 2025
Stern Ritter "V" Gwenael Lee claims his power allows him to erase himself from an opponent's senses, yet Yachiru instinctively strikes him down every time he reappears with her Zanpakutō, Sanpo Kenjū. The real "V", Gremmy Thoumeaux, appears and reveals Lee was merely a creation of his imagination before erasing him from existence. Gremmy explains that his true ability is turning imagination into reality and states he has already killed Rose and Kensei. Demonstrating his power, he imagines Yachiru's bones turning into cookies, which incapacitates her. Kenpachi arrives and informs Isane of Unohana's death before challenging Gremmy. Gremmy attempts to drown Kenpachi, but he breaks free and wounds him. Gremmy then imagines heavy artillery and a clone to double his power, but Kenpachi withstands them. Gremmy then imagines a meteor falling into the Seireitei. Kenpachi releases his Zanpakutō, Nozarashi, and slashes the meteor in pieces. Gremmy creates numerous clones, casting Kenpachi into outer space, yet he escapes it and slashes Gremmy again. Desperate, Gremmy imagines his body to be as strong as Kenpachi's, but his perception of Kenpachi as a monster causes his own body to collapse under immense pressure. The dying Gremmy reveals his true form: a brain sustained within an imaginary body.
387	21	"The Headless Star"	Mitsutoshi Satō	Masaki Hiramatsu	Mitsutoshi Satō	Michio Hasegawa	August 26, 2023	October 19, 2025
A severely injured Kenpachi orders his squad members to search for the missing Yachiru before suddenly being ambushed by the Bambie Stern Ritters Candice Catnipp ("T"), Giselle Gewelle ("Z"), Meninas McAllon ("P"), and Liltotto Lamperd ("G"). Though Kenpachi initially puts up a fight against them, their combined assault eventually overwhelms him. Ichigo suddenly crashes down from the sky, opening a massive hole leading to the Royal Palace, and effortlessly pushes the quartet back. The Bambies activate their Quincy Vollständig forms to fight him. Candice charges an immense lightning bolt to attack Ichigo, but he counters her by merging two Getsuga Tenshō into one powerful cross-shaped strike, the Getsuga Jūjishō, severing Candice's arm. Giselle regenerates it for her using a dead Soul Reaper's flesh. Before the Bambies can attack Ichigo again, several other Stern Ritters intervene. As Ichigo faces an overwhelming number of Stern Ritters, he notices Yhwach from afar. While Renji and several other Soul Reapers hold the enemy off for him, Ichigo charges toward Yhwach, but Uryū intervenes, warning Ichigo to leave them. Chad and Orihime arrive from Hueco Mundo to assist Ichigo, as Yhwach, Haschwalth, and Uryū ascend to the Royal Palace.
388	22	"Marching Out the Zombies" (Note: Stylized as "Marching Out the ZOMBIES")	Young-Hoon Jung	Masaki Hiramatsu	Yōichi Fujita	Kiyoshi Komatsubara	September 9, 2023	October 26, 2025
Yhwach's ascent to the Soul Palace creates a massive shockwave, prompting Shunsui to question why Ichibei would allow this to happen. Orihime and Chad confront Ichigo regarding Uryū, only for Urahara to intervene and escort them to Squad 12's barracks. There, Urahara unveils a one-use replica of the Shiba clan's spiritual cannon to launch them toward the Soul Palace. Since it demands immense spirit energy, Yoruichi Shihōin and the remaining Visored collected Reishi from distortions in the living world created by the Quincies. Meanwhile, Byakuya battles multiple Stern Ritters while Bazz-B targets Renji and Rukia. Giselle attempts to taunt Ikkaku and Yumichika into cutting her. Enraged when they refuse and Yumichika calls her a man, Giselle summons a zombified Bambietta. Giselle explains that her power requires killing Quincies before zombification, confirming she killed Bambietta herself. As Ikkaku and Yumichika are cornered, Mayuri and Nemu arrive. Mayuri disables the zombified Bambietta with a special device and counters Giselle's army of zombified Squad 11 soldiers with his own undead Arrancar forces from Szayelaporro Grantz's lab, including Luppi Antenor, Dordoni Alessandro Del Socaccio, Cirucci Sanderwicci, and Charlotte Chuhlhourne, who quickly overpower Giselle's zombies. Cornered, Giselle reveals her trump card: a zombified Tōshirō Hitsugaya.
389	23	"Marching Out the Zombies 2" (Note: Stylized as "Marching Out the ZOMBIES 2")	Takahiro Enokida	Masaki Hiramatsu	Atsushi Wakabayashi	Kumiko Takayanagi	September 16, 2023	November 2, 2025
Hitsugaya swiftly defeats Ikkaku, Yumichika, and Charlotte before Mayuri intervenes, who uses specialized drugs to neutralize Giselle's control over him as he slowly reawakens Hitsugaya's consciousness. Giselle retaliates by summoning her strongest remaining Soul Reaper zombies: Kensei, Rose, and Rangiku, but Cirucci, Luppi, and Dordoni join the fray as ordered by Mayuri and even out the playing field. Using a genetically modified blood-like substance, Mayuri seizes full control of Giselle's Soul Reaper zombies and one of them impales her. Elsewhere, Byakuya unleashes his Bankai to defeat Candice, Robert Accutrone, and NaNaNa Najahkoop, while Meninas and Liltotto observe from a distance. Hisagi arrives to assist but suddenly turns on Byakuya, revealing he is being manipulated by PePe Waccabrada, Stern Ritter "L". PePe's power, The Love, enslaves anything with a soul, including Meninas, who goes on to attack Liltotto. PePe even enchants Senbonzakura to his will, forcing Byakuya's Zanpakutō against him as Hisagi takes it under PePe's influence. Just as Byakuya is cornered, Mayuri and his zombified allies arrive. Kensei incapacitates Hisagi and activates his Bankai to obliterate PePe. Liltotto stumbles upon PePe and devours him as revenge backstabbing her and Meninas. Meanwhile, Yhwach, Haschwalth, and Uryū finally reach the Soul Palace.
390	24	"Too Early to Win, Too Late to Know" (Note: Stylized without the comma)	Takahiro Ōtsuka	Masaki Hiramatsu	Yōichi Fujita	Kumiko Takayanagi	September 23, 2023	November 9, 2025
Thousands of years ago, Ichibe offered a young Yhwach a non-aggression pact to end conflict between Soul Reapers and Quincies. Yhwach questioned why the Soul Reapers enslaved the Soul King, his father, and used him to split one eternal realm into the World of the Living, Hueco Mundo, and Soul Society. Though Ichibe offered the Soul King's left arm as a peace token, Yhwach swore to erase his father and reunify the realms to "save" him. In the present, Urahara fires a cannon to send Ichigo, Orihime, Chad, Yoruichi, and Ganju to the Royal Palace. Aware of the invading Quincies, Senjumaru leads the Royal Guard in cutting down the Soldaten and killing Nianzol Weizol "W", the Wind. In response, Yhwach summons his Schutzstaffel: Lille Barro ("X"), Gerard Valkyrie ("M"), Pernida Parnkgjas ("C"), and newly promoted Askin. Lille apparently fires a shot through Senjumaru's head and destroys the Soul Palace. However, Senjumaru reveals this was all a decoy and the Quincies are actually trapped within Kirio's Cage of Life. Joined by Tenjirō and Ōetsu, the Royal Guard counterattacks. Ōetsu unveils Sayafushi, a Zanpakutō so sharp it cannot be sheathed, and annihilates the Schutzstaffel. Yhwach escapes the cage and advances toward Ichibe.
391	25	"The Master"	Shinichirō Ueda	Masaki Hiramatsu	Shinichirō Ueda	Kiyoshi Komatsubara	September 30, 2023	November 16, 2025
At the ruins of Squad 12's barracks, Kisuke assembles the surviving Visoreds alongside Yūshirō Shihōin, Yoruichi's younger brother, to prepare for an ascent to the Royal Palace. Meanwhile, Ichibe clashes with Yhwach, wielding his brush-shaped Zanpakutō that cuts names instead of flesh, halving the power of whatever it strikes. A single blow drastically weakens Yhwach. Tenjirō activates his Shikai to defeat Haschwalth, while Senjumaru manipulates Reishi to overwhelm Uryū's Licht Regen, knocking him unconscious. Ōetsu is stunned when Askin survives his earlier strike. Askin reveals that his Schrift "D", the Deathdealing, allows him to control lethal dosages of substances within his body and others. By ingesting his own blood, he make its dangerously toxic to Ōetsu. Tenjirō intervenes, using his hot springs to purge the poison from Ōetsu's system, allowing him to finally kill Askin. Ichibe's momentum in his fight halts when Yhwach activates Auswählen, absorbing Reishi and Schrift powers from surviving Stern Ritters in the Seireitei to resurrect the Schutzstaffel and Haschwalth, who all ascend into Vollständig. Liltotto, Giselle, and Bazz-B manage to survive this and swear vengeance. Shunsui resigns his command and joins Jūshirō Ukitake, who reveals he used Kamikake to suppress his illness to fight once again.
392	26	"Black"	Hikaru Murata, Dali Chen, Takahiro Enokida & Itoko Nagai	Masaki Hiramatsu	Hikaru Murata	Michio Hasegawa, Kiyoshi Komatsubara & Kumiko Takayanagi	September 30, 2023	November 23, 2025
After being revived by Auswählen, Lille shoots Ōetsu, revealing his Schrift "X", the X-Axis, allows him to fire through any material between his rifle and target, bypassing any defenses. Senjumaru rescues and heals Ōetsu while Kirio transforms the battlefield with overgrown flora, splitting opponents for one-on-one duels. Senjumaru immobilizes Gerard with her threads, Kirio entraps Pernida in Reishi seeds, and Askin dodges Tenjirō's assaults. Ōetsu evades Lille's shots, even standing atop his rifle before countering. Ichibe continues battling Yhwach using high-level Kidō and activates his Shikai, splattering black ink that erases names and, by extension, power. When Yhwach's blade is stained, it becomes useless. Gerard breaks free and defeats Senjumaru, Pernida shreds Kirio's roots, and Askin wounds Tenjirō. Lille overcomes Ōetsu's speed by firing through him directly. Ōetsu reveals that their true powers were sealed to prevent cosmic imbalance as he, Tenjirō, and Kirio sacrifice themselves and channel their lifeforce into Senjumaru. She releases her Bankai: Shatatsu Karagara Shigaraminotsuji, enveloping the Schutzstaffel, Haschwalth, and Uryū in a shifting void where she individually executes them with woven cloths. Meanwhile, Ichibe floods Yhwach with Black Ink, renaming him "Black Ant" with Shirafude Ichimonji, his Shinuchi, aka Bankai before crushing and hurling him from the Soul Palace.

=== Part 3: The Conflict (2024) ===
No. overall	No. in series	Title	Directed by	Written by	Storyboarded by	Chief animation directed by	Original release date	English air date
393	27	"A"	Hikaru Murata	Masaki Hiramatsu & Tomohisa Taguchi	Hikaru Murata	Michio Hasegawa	October 5, 2024	November 30, 2025
While falling, Yhwach finally regains his Schrift as per the Kaiser Gesang. He activates "A", the Almighty, which allows him to ward off Ichibe's power and become all-seeing. Ichibe attempts to trap him, but Yhwach breaks through due to his regained ability and kills him. Having survived, Uryū manages to reflect the effects of Senjumaru's Bankai back onto her with his Schrift, the Antithesis, and after a brief battle, pierces her heart. Following their victory against Squad 0, Uryū, Haschwalth and the Schutzstaffel reunite with Yhwach and kneel before him as he reaches the Soul King and impales him. Ichigo's group arrives at the Soul Palace and calls out Ichibe's name, which raises him back from the dead by using a small portion of Ichigo's spiritual pressure. Currently powerless, Ichibe asks Ichigo to stop Yhwach. Meanwhile, Shunsui approaches Aizen in the Muken.
394	28	"Kill the King"	Yoshinori Odaka & Hikaru Murata	Masaki Hiramatsu	Tomohisa Taguchi	Kumiko Takayanagi	October 12, 2024	December 7, 2025
Shinji, Soi-Fon, Momo and Ōmaeda head to the R&D Department, where Urahara and Nanao work to launch reinforcements to the Royal Palace. At the same time, Renji and Rukia depart the battlefield as Ukitake tends to Kenpachi's wounds. Meanwhile, Ichigo's group reaches Yhwach, unaware that he has already impaled the Soul King. Ichigo confronts Yhwach, who praises the strength he gained from Ichibe's training but proceeds to declare that he sent Ichigo to him knowing he would still lose. During their battle, Yhwach reveals he has not yet used his eyes and activates the Almighty, granting him the power to foresee every possible attack. Ichigo's strikes are instantly nullified as he is thrown back towards his team. Yhwach presents to the group the Soul King, skewered by his blade, which shocks them. Ichigo dashes towards the Soul King and pulls Yhwach's sword free from his body. After this action however, the sword reacts to Ichigo's Quincy blood and involuntarily forces him to deliver the killing blow, severing his body into two pieces. Yhwach informs the group that only a full hybrid like Ichigo could actually kill the Soul King. His death begins to trigger massive earthquakes across all three worlds.
395	29	"The Dark Arm"	Young-Hoon Jung	Masaki Hiramatsu	Young-Hoon Jung	Michio Hasegawa	October 19, 2024	December 14, 2025
Born with an incurable lung disease, Ukitake is saved from death after his parents pray to a local deity of the Rukon district, Mimihagi, that happpens to be the right arm of the Soul King. Mimihagi fuses with Ukitake, thus stopping his sickness from progressing, but not curing him. Ukitake joins the Soul Reaper Academy under the tutelage of Yamamoto, Sasakibe, and Unohana, and becomes close friends with his sparring partner Shunsui, confiding in him about Mimihagi. Later, the two mourn Kaien, and Yamamoto with Unohana, after which Ukitake bids farewell to Unohana. Back in the present day, Ukitake reveals to the others that the Kamikake process he underwent gave all his organs, not just his lungs to Mimihagi and, after handing over Squad 13 to Rukia, uses his life force to hold the Soul King together temporarily. While Ichigo, Yoruichi, Chad, and Ganju try to distract Yhwach, Orihime fails to reverse the Soul King's death, but Mimihagi attaches itself to him, something that not even Yhwach's eyes foresaw. In the Muken, Shunsui partially unseals Aizen and tries to make a deal with him to help save the Soul Society.
396	30	"The Betrayer"	Itoko Nagai	Masaki Hiramatsu	Yōichi Fujita	Kiyoshi Komatsubara	October 26, 2024	December 21, 2025
Yhwach realizes he failed to foresee the Soul King's right arm aiding its body because the arm is part of the Soul King himself. As Yhwach attempts to destroy both, Ichigo grabs his arm to restrain him. Yoruichi erects a stabilizing barrier around the Soul King's remains, buying them time. Yhwach mocks Ichigo for being unable to kill the man responsible for his mother's death and calls him weak. Ichigo prepares to attack Yhwach, but Uryū suddenly shoots Yoruichi, causing her to lose focus over the barrier. Pernida contorts Yoruichi's arm and she is blasted off the Soul Palace by Yhwach. Uryū declares his loyalty to the Quincies, devastating Ichigo as the two begin fighting. Uryū is shocked when Ichigo blocks his arrow using Blut Vene, revealing his Quincy abilities. Meanwhile, Chad, Ganju, and Orihime attempt to fight the Schutzstaffel but are quickly overwhelmed. Uryū activates his Vollständig and attacks Ichigo. Uryū prepares a massive Quincy arrow, which Ichigo counters by using Getsuga Jūjishō. Uryū manages to land a decisive blow, seriously wounding Ichigo and sending him falling. Yhwach completely shatters the Soul King's crystal and absorbs both his body and right arm, which creates multiple eyes across his face.
397	31	"Against the Judgement"	Takumi Ichikawa	Masaki Hiramatsu	Takumi Ichikawa	Michio Hasegawa	November 2, 2024	January 4, 2026
Yhwach's unstable energy erupts across the Soul Society, manifesting as grotesque infant-like eyed parasites that rain down and overwhelm the Soul Reapers. Aizen arrives bound in Mayuri's restraint chair and effortlessly annihilates the creatures using only his spiritual pressure. Though many Soul Reapers are disgusted by Aizen's release, Shunsui defends the decision in the face of their potential annihilation by the Quincies. Aizen is suddenly immobilized by NaNaNa, who activates his Schrift "U", the Underbelly. However, the other surviving Quincies: Bazz-B, Liltotto, and Giselle, intervene as Bazz-B kills NaNaNa and reveals they intend on betraying Yhwach for abandoning them during Auswählen. Shunsui accepts their assistance. To reach the Soul Palace, Shunsui orders all remaining Soul Reapers to pour their Reiryoku into a gateway that Urahara can activate. Kenpachi, now recovered from his previous battle, arrives as a quickly recouped Aizen prepares to support their battle from the ground. An assault force of captains, lieutenants, Visoreds, and rogue Quincies prepare to depart for the palace. Meanwhile, Orihime heals Ichigo and Yoruichi as they plan their counterattack. Grimmjow arrives from Hueco Mundo to assist them. From above, Yhwach completes his absorption of the Soul King and begins reshaping the entire Soul Society.
398	32	"The Holy Newborn"	Shinichirō Ueda	Masaki Hiramatsu	Shinichirō Ueda	Kumiko Takayanagi	November 9, 2024	January 11, 2026
Grimmjow attempts to pick a fight with Ichigo immediately, but he is stopped by Nelliel, who reveals that Urahara created a bracelet for her, which allows her to transform into her original form at will. From the Garganta, Fullbringers Riruka Dokugamine and Yukio Hans Vorarlberna emerge as well, as they were also recruited by Urahara to combine their powers, allowing Ichigo's group to swiftly reach the top of the Soul Palace. The Soul Reapers power up the gate as the Seireitei starts to crumble. Due to Yhwach, more cities in the Seireitei begin to break down, the remains of which he raises up to the Soul Palace, completely transforming it into a Quincy city named Wahr Welt, which is shaped like a massive Quincy Zeichen. Ichigo's group and the Soul Reapers arrive at Wahr Welt simultaneously, shocked by the power one could wield to reshape the entire Soul Palace effortlessly. Yukio and Riruka stay behind in the Garganta to act as a potential getaway. Haschwalth reports about the arrival of Ichigo's group and the Soul Reaper troop to Yhwach from inside their newly reconstructed central castle.
399	33	"Gate of the Sun"	Dali Chen	Masaki Hiramatsu	Dali Chen	Kiyoshi Komatsubara	November 16, 2024	January 18, 2026
Yhwach sends Uryū and the Schutzstaffel to eliminate the Soul Reapers. Due to using the bathroom the same time as Kenpachi, Hanatarō Yamada is taken along by his squad after Mayuri initially stayed behind to change the coordinates he would be sent to. Mayuri and Nemu split off from Kenpachi, Hanatarō, Yumichika, and Ikkaku, as both groups venture towards the central castle. Gerard searches for Soul Reapers to fight. After Bazz-B, Liltotto and Giselle separate from them to confront Haschwalth and Yhwach, the main Soul Reaper group is assaulted by Lille, who succeeds in shooting down Hisagi, Ōmaeda, Kiyone Kotetsu, Sentarō Kotsubaki and Isane, thus scattering the pack. Elsewhere, Ichigo's group runs into Askin as Grimmjow runs off to immediately pounce him. After being forced to play on the defensive, Askin turns the tables on Grimmjow and paralyzes him as Ichigo arrives to rescue him. Meanwhile, Uryū begins firing arrows at Renji, who gets separated from the main group. Renji unleashes his Bankai and effortlessly overpowers Uryū until the latter activates his Vollständig, but Renji counters through it. Backed into a corner, Uryū uses Sklave Rei to overcharge his Vollständig, after which he overcomes Renji and shoots him through the chest.
400	34	"Baby, Hold Your Hand"	Takahiro Ōtsuka	Masaki Hiramatsu	Atsushi Wakabayashi	Michio Hasegawa	November 23, 2024	January 25, 2026
Lille observes Uryū defeating Renji from afar as Bazz-B heads to confront Haschwalth, while Giselle and Liltotto pursue Yhwach. Elsewhere, Mayuri, Nemu, Kenpachi, Ikkaku, and Yumichika encounter Pernida Parnkgjas, a grotesque Quincy which is soon revealed to be the left arm of the Soul King. Ignoring Mayuri's warnings, Kenpachi charges forth and strikes Pernida, but it retaliates by manipulating Kenpachi's nerves, grotesquely twisting his right arm until Kenpachi is forced to sever it. When Kenpachi attacks again, Pernida overwhelms him completely, damaging his body until Mayuri stabs Kenpachi from behind to paralyze and stop Pernida's nerve control. Mayuri deduces that Pernida weaponizes its nerves to invade and control both organic and inorganic matter. After acid fails to stop it, Pernida transforms into a much larger, speaking arm form. When Mayuri severs one of its fingers to preserve it as a specimen, Pernida regenerates two new arms from it, revealing its quick regenerative abilities. To counter this, Mayuri unveils his modified Bankai, Konjiki Ashisogi Jizō Matai Fukuin Shōtai, a giant, pregnant Ashisogi Jizō that gives birth to specialized combat forms. Built with 70,000 layered nerves on the outside to resist Pernida's control, Mayuri's Bankai quickly devours all three of its arms.
401	35	"Don't Chase a Shadow"	Ema Saito, Tomohisa Taguchi, Shintaro Matsui & Hikaru Murata	Masaki Hiramatsu	Ema Saito	Kumiko Takayanagi	November 30, 2024	February 1, 2026
Lille continues sniping off the Soul Reapers, forcing Shunsui to use his Shikai consisting of children's games to stall him. Per Shunsui's orders, Nanao instructs the others to continue onwards as she goes to support him. After his rifle is severed by Shunsui, Lille explains that the gun is part of him and created from Reishi, elaborating that he was the first Quincy to receive powers from Yhwach. Lille activates his Vollständig, turning into an angelic, eight-winged being that supposedly cannot be killed by any weapon. Having been gravely injured by Lille's new form, Shunsui is forced to use his Bankai, Katen Kyōkotsu Karamatsu Shinju, which envelops the Wahr Welt. Shunsui initiates a theatrical play composed of several acts, selecting a play composed of four acts with two actors, him and Lille. With the first act Shunsui reflects his injuries onto Lille, with the second act he infects him with an illness, with the third act he plummets both of them into an infinite sea, and with the final act Shunsui uses a thread composed of regret to explosively decapitate Lille. After Lille's body floats down to the ground, Shunsui collapses and is comforted by his Zanpakutō's manifested spirit, Ohana.
402	36	"Baby, Hold Your Hand 2 [Never Ending My Dream]" (Note: Stylized as "BABY, HOLD YOUR HAND 2 [Never Ending My Dream]")	Young-Hoon Jung	Masaki Hiramatsu	Susumu Nishizawa	Kiyoshi Komatsubara	December 7, 2024	February 8, 2026
Pernida destroys Ashisogi Jizō by firing nerve-laced arrows from its Quincy bow. Nemu saves Mayuri from a fatal strike as both are forced to sever their own arms to stop Pernida's nerves. After regenerating them using drugs, Mayuri orders Nemu to inject a nerve-coagulating agent into one of Pernida's arrows. Though it spreads through Pernida's body, it simply amputates the infected finger, revealing its rapid evolution. Recognizing Pernida's adaptive growth, Nemu exceeds her artificial body's limits and compresses six percent of her soul into a single strike to impale Pernida. Its body explodes but it regenerates quick enough to obliterate her body. A grief-stricken Mayuri recovers Nemu's brain as Pernida advances to eat her remains. Mayuri reveals his final contingency to Pernida: Nemu's pituitary gland housed a synthetic organ that triggers uncontrolled cell division without her brain. Pernida's body grotesquely mutates and self destructs, though a surviving nerve manages to cripple Mayuri's legs. Yumichika and Ikkaku rescue Mayuri and retreat to containment pods holding Rangiku, Hitsugaya, Kensei, and Rose, all of whom Mayuri successfully de-zombified. Rangiku and Hitsugaya are ejected for Mayuri and Kenpachi to recover. Elsewhere, Giselle, Liltotto, and the zombified Bambies battle Yhwach's Soldats as Bazz-B confronts Haschwalth.
403	37	"Shadows Gone"	Shinichirō Ueda	Masaki Hiramatsu	Shinichirō Ueda	Michio Hasegawa	December 14, 2024	February 15, 2026
As a child, Shunsui often visited his older brother and sister-in-law, the matriarch of the Ise Clan: a priest family cursed so that its male members die young. Their sacred blade, Shinken Hakkyōken, was inherited by female heirs and possessed the power to reflect divine energy back at gods. After her husband's death, the matriarch secretly entrusted the blade to Shunsui to spare her daughter, Nanao, from its curse. Shunsui concealed it within his secondary Zanpakutō spirit, Okyo, which was created by the original spirit, Ohana. The Central 46 later learned that the weapon was lost and had the matriarch executed. Nanao would end up entering the Soul Reaper Academy, excelling in Kidō. She was assigned to Squad 8, unknowingly serving under her uncle, Shunsui, who guided her growth. Back in the present, Shunsui is critically wounded by a revived Lille. Using his Shikai, Shunsui hides himself and the reunited Nanao inside Lille's shadow and returns her inherited blade. Despite getting cut by Lille during her exit out of his shadow, Nanao wields Shinken Hakkyōken and reflects his blast back towards him, obliterating much of Wahr Welt and bisecting the Quincy. Exhausted, she and Shunsui collapse as the battle ends.
404	38	"Friend" (Note: Stylized in all lowercase)	Dali Chen	Masaki Hiramatsu	Toshiyuki Tsuru (Note: Credited as Yasuaki Kurotsu)	Kiyoshi Komatsubara	December 21, 2024	February 22, 2026
Around a thousand years ago in Licht Reich, Bazzard "Bazz-B" Black and Jugram Haschwalth grew up in a rural Quincy settlement. Bazz-B was gifted, able to absorb Reishi and form a Heilig Bogen, while Jugram lacked Reishi abilities. Despite this they formed a close bond, with Bazz-B hunting to sharpen his skills and Jugram supporting him, surviving together as friends. Their childhood is destroyed when Yhwach and his army destroy their entire village. Now orphaned, the boys spent five years training in the wilderness. Jugram honed his swordsmanship to compensate for his inability to gather Reishi. When Stern Ritter recruiters arrived, Bazz-B eagerly volunteered, but both were dismissed until Yhwach appeared. His overwhelming spiritual pressure crushed every citizen except Jugram. Yhwach declared Jugram a rare Balance Quincy, one who distributes Reishi rather than absorbing it. Realizing Jugram's true potential, Yhwach claimed him as his other self. When Bazz-B attempted to strike Yhwach down, Jugram blocked his attack. Three years later, Jugram rose to become the Stern Ritter's Grandmaster as Bazz-B served beneath him, still clinging to hopes of overthrowing Yhwach. Back in the present, Bazz-B challenges Jugram with his full power. However, Jugram effortlessly defeats and kills his former friend.
405	39	"The Visible Answer"	Itoko Nagai	Masaki Hiramatsu	Itoko Nagai	Michio Hasegawa	December 28, 2024	March 1, 2026
As Yhwach absorbs Mimihagi in his sleep, violent tremors shake all three worlds. During this upheaval, Jugram activates the Almighty and confronts Uryū, questioning his loyalty and hinting at his future betrayal that has already been foreseen. Elsewhere, the Visoreds rescue and heal Renji, who rejoins Urahara, Shinji, Momo, Rukia, Byakuya, and Soi-Fon as they are confronted by Gerard Valkyrie. Though they initially kill Gerard, he resurrects using his Schrift the Miracle, transforming the damage inflicted onto him into size growth, turning into a colossal giant who decimates everyone nearby. As this happens, Askin incapacitates Ichigo, Orihime, and Chad, revealing that Gerard and Pernida were not granted Schrifts by Yhwach, but instead possessed innate powers allegedly as the Soul King's respective heart and left arm. As Askin prepares to kill the trio, Yoruichi intervenes. After Orihime heals the group, Yoruichi commands Ichigo onward to confront Yhwach while she and her brother Yūshirō battle Askin. However, Askin adapts, becoming immune to Yūshirō's spiritual pressure and impales him. Meanwhile, Haschwalth strikes Uryū down, sending him near Ichigo's team. Back in the World of the Living, Isshin Kurosaki and Ryūken Ishida meet at a graveyard, and prepare to travel to the Soul Society.
406	40	"My Last Words"	Hikaru Murata & Tomohisa Taguchi	Masaki Hiramatsu	Hikaru Murata	Kumiko Takayanagi	December 28, 2024	March 8, 2026
Haschwalth confronts Uryū, claiming he already foresaw his intentions and orders him to prove his loyalty by killing Ichigo, Orihime and Chad. Meanwhile, Gerard hunts down battered Soul Reaper opponents until the Visoreds gather and activate their Hollow masks to confront him. Yoruichi continues her battle with Askin while also protecting her injured brother. Down in the Seireitei, remains of Lille fall down and begin spawning smaller bird clones, but a recouped Izuru swiftly eliminates one of them. Ichigo's clash with Uryū sends them, Orihime, and Chad falling down to the castle's lower levels. Uryū reveals his true motive: he joined Yhwach not out of loyalty, but to stop him. It is revealed that his grandfather, Sōken Ishida, discovered that Yhwach's revival cost countless Quincy lives. Uryū wants to send the trio back home using his Sun Key, but Haschwalth arrives, revealing he already foresaw this and destroyed the gate. Uryū sends Ichigo's group ahead to confront Yhwach while he stays behind to face down Haschwalth. Elsewhere, Isshin and Ryūken use Sōken's old Sun Key to open a different Gate of the Sun and enter Wahr Welt. Meanwhile, Yhwach kills the surviving Bambies for attempting to interfere with his slumber.

=== Part 4: The Calamity (2026) ===
No. overall	No. in series	Title	Directed by	Written by	Storyboarded by	Chief animation directed by	Original release date	English air date
407	41	"God of Thunder"	Dali Chen	Masaki Hiramatsu & Tomohisa Taguchi	Dali Chen	Kumiko Takayanagi	July 25, 2026	TBA
Yhwach sees a vision of a future of Ichigo killing him, but dismisses it as a dream. Giant guardian statues within the palace attempt to hold off Ichigo's search for Yhwach, but Chad and Ganju stay behind to fend them off. Uryū engages Haschwalth in battle, but the Almighty allows him to avoid all of his attacks and immobilizes him. Haschwalth shows Uryū the rifts starting to form in the Three Worlds, which are also observed in the World of the Living by Jinta Hanakari, Ururu Tsumugiya and Tessai Tsukabishi. Yoruichi and Yūshirō lay badly beaten at Askin's feet, but Kisuke arrives and gives Yoruichi a temporary antidote to Askin's Death-Dealing, before triggering her transformation into a wild, feline-like Thunder God form, called Raiju Senkei Shunryu Kokubyo Senki. Her erratic spiritual pressure and greatly increased speed and power allow her to pummel Askin, before the antidote wears off. Just as Kisuke prepares to finish off Askin, he rises and uses his Vollständig, Hass Hein.
408	42	"Son of Darkness"	Shintaro Matsui	Masaki Hiramatsu & Tomohisa Taguchi	Shintaro Matsui	Kiyoshi Komatsubara	August 1, 2026	TBA
Askin reveals that his Vollständig greatly increases the speed of his adaptability, making Yoruichi's transformation inept. He focuses the Death Dealing's ability into a small Gift Ring projectile, using it to burst Kisuke's eyes. Kisuke is forced to unleash his Bankai, Kannon-Biraki Benihime Aratame, which allows him to reconstruct the physical build of anything he touches. Using this, Kisuke rearranges his body to give himself superhuman speed and reflexes, while also deconstructing Askin's body, if in range. During the high-octane fight, Grimmjow successfully launches a surprise attack and rips Askin's heart out from behind and crushes it. Askin reveals that the Gift Ball Deluxe's potency exponentially increases in death, so they are getting poisoned to death within as he dies. Nelliel jumps in from outside to rescue them. Ichigo and Orihime reach Yhwach, and engage him in battle, while Orihime defends Ichigo. Meanwhile, Haschwalth repels all of Uryū's attacks, claiming that they greatly underestimate Yhwach even without the Almighty.
409	43	"Blood for My Bone"	Shinichirō Ueda	Masaki Hiramatsu & Tomohisa Taguchi	Shinichirō Ueda	Michio Hasegawa	August 8, 2026	TBA
Kenpachi breaks out of Mayuri's pod fully healed. Orihime is rejecting more and more of Yhwach's Soul King power, while both Yhwach and Haschwalth reveal to their respective opponents the true intent of Ichibe. Ichigo was shown the Soul King's memories and was trained by Squad 0 in an effort to groom him to become the next Soul King, since he is the perfect hybrid of the five races. Haschwalth and Yhwach both explain that if somehow the latter were to die, the worlds would still cease to exist, since the position of lynchpin for the Three Worlds as the Soul King was also taken over by Yhwach. Ichigo refuses to back down, because the people he wants to protect would also be destroyed if Yhwach joins all of the worlds together. As Ichigo swipes away at Yhwach's attacks, he begins to awaken his hollow side and turns into a half-hollow form with a horn. Meanwhile, Gerard withstands all of the Visoreds' attacks and incapacitates them. Hitsugaya and Byakuya join forces against him, but just when they are about to be crushed, Kenpachi saves them, Shikai in hand and the three team up against the giant.
410	44	"The Perfect Crimson"	Young-Hoon Jung	Masaki Hiramatsu	Young-Hoon Jung	Kumiko Takayanagi	August 15, 2026	TBA
Kenpachi tries to fight Gerard one-on-one, but is brutally beaten back. Yachiru appears in his subconscious, revealed to be his Zanpakutō spirit Nozarashi's physical manifestation and gives him the power of Bankai. Kenpachi rises with an oni-like appearance and a broken cleaver, but cannot control himself. He savagely bites Gerard's arm off and pushes him off the Soul Palace. Gerard uses his wings to fly back up just as Kenpachi vertically cuts him in half. However, Gerard's Quincy cross remained intact as the Soul King's heart forms around it and resurrects Gerard in his Vollständig, Aschtonig. Kenpachi tries to fight back, but his body crumbles from the power of his Bankai. Momo heals Renji and Rukia as Byakuya sends them to help Ichigo. Hitsugaya's Bankai reaches its complete form, forcing him to grow into an adult body to support it. With his complete Bankai he easily destroys Gerard's sword and shield and fully freezes him, allowing Byakuya to cut him to pieces. The Miracle still reforms him to an even larger size. As the Three Worlds start to blend, the Soul Reapers left below the palace go to the World of the Living to exterminate the overflowing Hollows. Meanwhile, Ichigo shows Orihime he controls his Hollow side now and launches a Getsuga Tenshō combined with a Gran Rey Cero at Yhwach, who draws his blade to finally fight.
411	45	"Defend You" (Note: The full title is actually "Life to Defend You" stylized in all caps, which is revealed at the end of the episode. However, official marketing still lists the incomplete title.)	Tomohisa Taguchi	Tomohisa Taguchi	Tomohisa Taguchi	Kiyoshi Komatsubara	August 22, 2026	TBA
Renji and Rukia reach Chad and Ganju, where Renji stays behind to clean the giant statues up faster, while Rukia goes ahead. Uryū carefully observes Haschwalth's usage of the Almighty and deduces that his future sight ability has a three-second cooldown. Using this, Uryū is able to distract Haschwalth and place the Leiden Hant glove on him to remove the Almighty's power completely. Meanwhile, Ichigo relentlessly dashes at Yhwach, who repeatedly kills him and fatally wounds Orihime, but the latter keeps rejecting it and healing both of them until Rukia finally arrives. With Rukia's help freezing Yhwach, Ichigo unleashes his full-hollow Bankai, Blood Chains, which grows him a second horn as bloody chains emerge from his neck and limbs. He greatly injures Yhwach with an enormous crescent-moon-shaped Getsuga Tenshō, but Yhwach still kills him. Orihime rejects this, and Ichigo and Rukia mount a combined attack, with Rukia unleashing her Bankai. However, they still end up impaled. Devastated by the carnage, Orihime unleashes all of her latent power to slam into Yhwach, who seemingly regained the Almighty, before she envelops the two into a flash of light which causes them to disappear.
412	46	"The End"	Itoko Nagai	Tomohisa Taguchi	Itoko Nagai	Michio Hasegawa	August 29, 2026	TBA
With the growing imbalance between the Three Worlds, Akon decides to open a gate to Hueco Mundo to restore it momentarily. Renji, Chad, and Ganju reach Ichigo and Rukia. Just as Ichigo is about to take his place as the new Soul King to fix the Three Worlds, Yhwach and the gravely injured Orihime reappear. Haschwalth reveals to Uryū that his Leiden Hant did not destroy the Almighty, but morning rose seconds prior to its activation and their powers switched back. With the Almighty returned to him, Yhwach shattered the future where Orihime killed him, explaining that the Almighty is not just the ability to see the future, but to also alter it. Haschwalth instantly slashes Uryū and explains that his own Schrift, the Balance, has returned. With it, Haschwalth can take his opponents' luck and give them an equal amount of misfortune, brutalizing Uryū. However, Uryū responds with his own Schrift, the Antithesis, which can switch two actions that have already taken place, using it to transfer his injuries to Haschwalth. Although Haschwalth rises and still beats Uryū, he is stripped of his Schrift by Yhwach's Auswählen, who uses the extra power to shatter Ichigo's Bankai and horn. Renji tries to use his Bankai, but Yhwach swiftly and seemingly kills him, Rukia, Chad, and Ganju, causing Ichigo to despair and eventually scream. On the verge of death from the Auswählen, Haschwalth asks Uryū to transfer his injuries to him and sends him to help his friends fight Yhwach.
413	47	"The End 2"	Shintaro Matsui	Tomohisa Taguchi	Kyosuke Shijo	Kumiko Takayanagi	September 5, 2026	TBA
The Rukon District is sacrificed to the invading Hollows to retain balance. Shunsui dreams of Ukitake entrusting his life to him and awakes to Nanao having healed him. Uryū returns to the Seed of Destruction Yhwach cultivated to destroy the world, where he finds Nelliel, Pesche and Dondochakka Bilstin, having successfully rescued Halibel from captivity. With the arrival of Shunsui and Nanao, Uryū explains that he plans to make the Seed of Destruction collide with the distortions in the world, so they could cancel each other out. To do so, Nelliel, Halibel, Nanao, Pesche, and Dondochakka plant bombs to separate the main palace from the Squad 0 riden, while Uryū will crash the main palace down onto the distortion. After absorbing Ichigo's Quincy powers mixed with the Hollow powers, Yhwach unleashes Auswählen again to kill and absorb Lille, Gerard, and Mimihagi, also killing Ukitake in the process. As he begins his chant to end the world, Uryū, Halibel, and Nelliel engage him in battle to allow Pesche and Dondochakka to recover Ichigo's group using Bawabawa as transportation. Uryū fires a giant arrow off to destroy the palace, which is prevented by the Almighty, but Uryū then uses the Antithesis to reverse it and place Yhwach at the center of the explosion. Uryū successfully contains the explosion as the distortions and the Seed of Destruction are annihilated, but Yhwach emerges unharmed and laughs it off before stepping through a portal.
414	48	"The End Two World"	Shinichirō Ueda	Masaki Hiramatsu	Shinichirō Ueda	Kiyoshi Komatsubara	September 12, 2026	TBA
Nanao prioritizes healing Ichigo and Renji. With help from Tsukishima and Ginjō, Orihime restores Ichigo's Bankai. Uryū is found by Isshin and Ryūken, who gives him the Still Silver arrowhead, explaining that Quincies hit by the Auswählen died from having silver blood clots form in their hearts and this arrowhead was forged by collecting that silver from their bodies, then telling him he should be the one to shoot it. Yhwach returns to the Soul Society, beginning to wreak havoc as Iba and Komamura head his way. Aizen taunts Yhwach, who destroys his confinements. Ichigo and Renji arrive and team up with Aizen to mount a coordinated attack on Yhwach. Although Yhwach seemingly counters and neutralizes them all, Ichigo soon arises and bisects him from behind with a massive Getsugatenshō, revealing that the hypnosis effect of Kyōka Suigetsu works on the Almighty. Yhwach swiftly regenerates, cuts Aizen apart and submerges him, then immobilizes Ichigo. Tatsuki is saved from Hollows by Ryūnosuke and Shino, just as Yhwach manifests himself at the same time in the Three Worlds and eventually begins their collapse. Shunsui, Soi Fon, Byakuya, and Hitsugaya arrive to back them up in the World of the Living. In Hueco Mundo, Halibel, child Nelliel, Grimmjow, Pesche, and Dondochakka stand up to Yhwach, while in the Soul Society, Uryū frees Ichigo.
415	49	"The Blade"	Dali Chen, Shintaro Matsui & Tomohisa Taguchi	Tomohisa Taguchi	Satoshi Sakai & Tomohisa Taguchi	Michio Hasegawa	October 20, 2026	TBA
Everyone battles through Soul King torrents to reach Yhwach. Though Ichigo, Byakuya and Grimmjow each reach the Yhwach of their respective worlds and cut him apart, Yhwach revives with the Almighty and grievously injures all the fighters. As Yhwach's power starts to close the skies of the Three Worlds to begin the reunification, Ganju, Iba and Nel each step into the shrinking holes left in Yhwach's power to give more time for the others before it closes, with Komamura and Ryūnosuke aiding the captains' attack in the Human World, while Orihime, Chad, and the Fullbringers support Akon's plan to charge a Reishi Cannon with Hollows to shoot Yhwach with. Grievously injured, Halibel asks Grimmjow to devour her and protect Hueco Mundo, but he refuses and charges at Yhwach. Uryū uses Ransotengai to puppet himself, asking Ichigo to create an opening in Yhwach's defenses again. Using Soi-Fon and Hitsugaya's Bankais, Shunsui launches himself at Yhwach. Though Yhwach pierces them all through and the Three Worlds start getting submerged, Uryū manages to shoot Yhwach with the Still Silver arrowhead, while Grimmjow bites Yhwach, which causes a reaction implied to be engineered by Kisuke, and Shunsui touches Yhwach and activates Mimihagi. With their combined efforts, Yhwach's Almighty momentarily stops working, allowing Ichigo to attack, but Yhwach to shatter the outer portion of Ichigo's Bankai, only to reveal the inner blade to be Ichigo's original Shikai. Yhwach realizes that his vision of Ichigo killing him was actually a future shown by the Almighty, not a dream shown to him by Haschwalth. At the same time, Pesche and Dondochakka push Grimmjow to stab Yhwach, and Ryūnosuke emerges from Shunsui's Kageoni and also stabs him, as Ichigo successfully bisect him for good.
416	50	"Death & Strawberry"	Hikaru Murata	Masaki Hiramatsu	Hikaru Murata	Kiyoshi Komatsubara, Kumiko Takayanagi & Masashi Kudo	October 27, 2026	TBA
With Aizen watching, Yhwach warns Ichigo that the cycle of life and death will remain forever due to his interference before vanishing. Ten years later, reconstructions are nearly finished. Isane, Iba and Lisa Yadōmaru have become captains of Squads 4, 7, and 8, respectively, while Kiyone, Ikkaku and Akon have become lieutenants of Squads 4, 11, and 12, respectively. The captains gather for the promotion of the new captain of Squad 13, Rukia. Meanwhile, Mayuri and the young Nemuri No. 8 discover remnants of Yhwach's Spiritual Pressure starting to emerge. Renji and Rukia travel to the World of the Living to attend a gathering of their school friends at the home of Ichigo and Orihime. They are there to watch Chad's professional boxing debut, though Uryū watches the match on his phone from the hospital roof, having become a doctor. Meanwhile, Ichigo and Orihime's son Kazui Kurosaki sees the remnant of Yhwach's power forming in front of him and effortlessly dissipates it by touching it, just as he is met by a fellow Soul Reaper cadet, Rukia and Renji's daughter Ichika Abarai.

=== Recap special ===
No. overall	No. in series	Title	Original release date
387.5	21.5	"The Blood Warfare, Separation (Interlude)"	September 2, 2023
A recap special covering the first 21 episodes of Bleach: Thousand-Year Blood War

== Home media release ==
=== Japanese ===
Aniplex (Region A/2, Blu-ray & DVD)
Vol.	Discs	Episodes	Release date	Ref.
I	2	1–13	April 26, 2023	
II	2	14–26	March 27, 2024	
III	2	27–40	May 28, 2025	
IV	2	41–50	March 24, 2027	

=== English ===
Viz Media (Region A, Blu-ray)
Part	Discs	Episodes	Release date	Ref.
1	2	1–13	March 26, 2024	
2	2	14–26	October 22, 2024	
3	2	27–40	January 13, 2026	

Anime Limited (Region B, Blu-ray)
Part	Discs	Episodes	Release date	Ref.
1	2	1–13	October 28, 2024	
2	2	14–26	March 31, 2025	
3	2	27–40	July 13, 2026	

== Reception ==
=== Critical response ===
Bleach: Thousand-Year Blood War received generally positive reviews from critics. IGN gave its premiere episode an 8 out of 10, praising the series's choreography and calls it "an impressive transformation for the series that hopefully will continue throughout the run". Brittany Vincent of Decider described it as a welcoming return for longtime viewers and said that it was "an action-packed show-stopper". Panos Kotzathanasis of Asian Movie Pulse noted the quality of the animation and commented that it "provides a great restart to the anime".

The second part, The Separation, also received positive ratings. Kotzathanasis noted on it being "cliched in a number of ways, and a bit overly perverse on occasion", but that it "comfortably manages to hold one of the top positions among shonen anime". Adrian Ruiz of But Why Tho? gave The Calamity 8 out of 10, praising the animation while also saying that "fans have plenty to be excited about as the journey toward its finale begins".

=== Accolades ===
The anime's Thousand-Year Blood War – The Separation was nominated for Best Action, while Johnny Yong Bosch was nominated in the Best Voice Artist Performance (English) for his work as Ichigo Kurosaki at the 8th Crunchyroll Anime Awards in 2024; The Conflict was nominated for three categories: Best Continuing Series, Best Action, and Best Score (Shirō Sagisu) at the ninth edition in 2025.
