= Bleach: Blade Battlers (series) =

Video game series

Cover art to Bleach: Blade Battlers

Bleach: Blade Battlers (BLEACH ～ブレイド・バトラーズ～) is a series of fighting games released only in Japan for the PlayStation 2 based on the manga and anime Bleach by Tite Kubo. There are two games in the series, both developed by Racjin and published by Sony Computer Entertainment. Both games became best-sellers in Japan.

== Gameplay ==
In the Blade Battlers series, the player takes control of one of many characters from the source material. As with most other fighting games, the idea is to fight the opposing character, or characters in the free-for-all mode, until their health is fully depleted. Players can use their characters' special abilities taken from the series, such as Ichigo Kurosaki's ability to unlock his bankai state or Rukia Kuchiki's control over ice with her zanpakutō. Some of these abilities may alter the arena, such as Rukia's zanpakutō causing the battlefield to become covered in ice and making other players slide around.

In Blade Battlers 2, specials attacks have been changed into special forms, resulting in the altering of area obstacles such as random attacks from summonings, shifting the area, etc.

Both games feature extensive battle modes, where the players can unlock characters after beating all of the challenges. Some missions have players to perform under certain circumstances, like a time limit. In both games there is a bonus section where the players can view character models and extras.

== History ==
=== Bleach: Blade Battlers ===
Bleach Blade Battlers is the first installment of the Blade Battlers series and was released in Japan on October 12, 2006. The game features 23 playable characters.

=== Bleach: Blade Battlers 2nd ===
Bleach: Blade Battlers 2nd (BLEACH ～ブレイド・バトラーズ2nd～) is the second installment in the Blade Battlers series. The game was released on September 27, 2007. Blade Battlers 2nd features 36 playable characters.

== Playable characters ==
Character	1	2
Byakuya Kuchiki	✓	✓
Gin Ichimaru	✓	✓
Grimmjow Jaegerjaquez	✗	✓
Hiyori Sarugaki	✗	✓
Ichigo Kurosaki	✓	✓
Hollow Ichigo	✓	✓
Ikkaku Madarame	✓	✓
Izuru Kira	✗	✓
Jūshirō Ukitake	✗	✓
Kaname Tōsen	✓	✓
Kenpachi Zaraki	✓	✓
Kisuke Urahara	✓	✓
Kon	✓	✓
Luppi	✗	✓
Mayuri Kurotsuchi	✓	✓
Momo Hinamori	✓	✓
Orihime Inoue	✓	✓
Rangiku Matsumoto	✓	✓
Renji Abarai	✓	✓
Rukia Kuchiki	✓	✓
Sajin Komamura	✓	✓
Shigekuni Yamamoto-Genryūsai	✗	✓
Shinji Hirako	✗	✓
Shunsui Kyōraku	✗	✓
Shūhei Hisagi	✗	✓
Suì-Fēng	✓	✓
Sousuke Aizen	✓	✓
Tōshirō Hitsugaya	✓	✓
Ulquiorra Schiffer	✗	✓
Ururu Tsumugiya	✓	✓
Uryū Ishida	✓	✓
Yachiru Kusajishi	✗	✓
Yammy Riyalgo	✗	✓
Yasutora Sado	✓	✓
Yoruichi Shihōin	✓	✓
Yumichika Ayasegawa	✗	✓
Total	23	36

== See also ==
- Bleach
- List of Bleach video games
- List of PlayStation 2 games
