= Bleach: Soul Resurrección =

2011 video game

- North American cover art
- Developers: Japan Studio; Racjin
- Publishers: JP: Sony Computer Entertainment; WW: NIS America
- Series: Bleach
- Platform: PlayStation 3
- Release: JP: June 23, 2011; NA: August 3, 2011; EU: September 16, 2011; AU: September 23, 2011
- Genre: Hack and slash
- Mode: Single-player

Bleach: Soul Resurrección (known as Bleach: Soul Ignition in Japan) is a 2011 hack and slash video game developed by Racjin and published by Sony Computer Entertainment for the PlayStation 3. It was released internationally by NIS America. The fourth Bleach film, Bleach: Hell Verse, was released on the Japanese PlayStation Store on December 24, 2010. The Japanese visual kei rock band Sid provided the game's main theme song "Ranbu no Melody" (乱舞のメロディ, Ranbu no Merodi; "Melody of the Wild Dance"), which is also the anime series' 13th Opening Theme, though only for the Japanese version, as the English and Asian versions uses a rearranged instrumental instead, due to licensing issues.

== Gameplay ==
Players utilize the PlayStation 3 controller's analog sticks and four shape buttons to control their character in 3D environment. Players move with the left analog stick while controlling the camera with the right. The X button performs a jump and pressing it again while in air performs a second jump. Melee is performed through the square button which can be utilized for combos.

The triangle button performs spirit attacks which consume spiritual pressure from the pressure bar which sits below the health bar at the top of the screen. Some characters have different spirit attacks based on whether they are on the ground or in the air. The circle button performs special attacks. Specials are strong moves that consume most if not all the pressure bar.

These attacks are different depending on if the character is on the ground or in the air. L1 is used to lock onto an opponent and R1 blocks. While blocking, the player can use the left analog stick to use Shunpo or Sonído to dodge. R2 performs a dash maneuver which can be held for a constant dash. L2 activates the ignition gauge which sits at the left of the screen.

Ignition lights the edges of the screen on fire and triples the power of a character's moves. The gauge can be filled by dealing damage to enemies. Once activated, the gauge will slowly drain. By pressing the L2 button again while in this mode, the character will be drained of all their remaining ignition gauge and utilize their ignition attack which is an immensely powerful move and the strongest a character has. The health bar at the top of the screen regenerates slowly as time progresses.

The more damage a player takes, the less health they can regenerate. The pressure bar regenerates quicker so long as the player is not dashing. Dashing also does mild damage. With each hit, a streak bar is refilled. The higher the streak, the higher the soul points multiplier is: 100 for a 2x multiplier, 300 for 3x multiplier and 1000 for a 4x multiplier.

Getting hit does not end the streak. At the end of a level, players are given a grade and extra soul points based on the number of points collected, difficulty played on, clear time, enemies defeated and Ignition attacks used. Once a level is over, the player can head to the level up menu and use the soul points they earned to learn new abilities and power up.

The player is placed on a grid and can only buy upgrades next to ones they have already unlocked. Paths to different grids will be locked until a certain character reaches a specified level. One level is considered buying one upgrade.

== Development ==
The original Japanese version, Bleach: Soul Ignition, was developed by Japan Studio and Racjin. The game was published by Sony Computer Entertainment and released on June 23, 2011. Soul Ignition, for North America under new name, Bleach: Soul Resurrección, was released on August 2 by NIS America. The game has a total of 21 playable characters that mostly come from the Arrancar arc.

== Characters ==
=== Playable characters ===
Character
Baraggan Luisenbarn
Byakuya Kuchiki
Coyote Starrk
Grimmjow Jaegerjaquez
Ichigo Kurosaki (Bankai, Full Hollowfication, Final Getsuga Tensho, Skull-Clad)
Gin Ichimaru
Kenpachi Zaraki
Kokutō
Nnoitra Gilga
Rukia Kuchiki
Sousuke Aizen
Soi Fon
Shunsui Kyoraku
Tier Harribel
Tōshirō Hitsugaya
Ulquiorra Cifer
Uryū Ishida
Yoruichi Shihoin

=== Non-playable characters ===
Character
Sajin Komamura
Sousuke Aizen (4th Hogyoku Form)
Yammy Llargo

== Reception ==
Reception

Aggregate score
Aggregator	Score
Metacritic	58/100

Review scores
Publication	Score
Destructoid	6/10
Famitsu	28/40
GamePro	3/5
GameSpot	5.5/10
GamesRadar+	2.5/5
GamesTM	4/10
IGN	7/10
PlayStation Official Magazine – UK	5/10
PALGN	6.5/10
PlayStation: The Official Magazine	5/10
411Mania	6.5/10
The A.V. Club	C−

The game received "mixed" reviews according to video game review aggregator Metacritic. In Japan, Famitsu gave it a score of all four sevens for a total of 28 out of 40.

The Japanese version sold 24,725 copies in its first week, while Soul Resurrección debuted in North America with 23,620 sold copies.
