= Dan Woren =

American voice actor

- Born: January 8, 1952 (age 74); San Diego, California, U.S.
- Occupation: Voice actor
- Years active: 1980–present

Dan Woren is an American voice actor who is known for providing voice work for anime, television, and video games. His role was voicing Roy Fokker in the Robotech series in the 1980s. Other major voice roles include Jagi in Fist of the North Star, Byakuya Kuchiki in Bleach, Yang Newman in Macross Plus, and Caster in Fate/Zero. He has narrated over 60 audiobooks and won various awards from AudioFile magazine.

== Filmography ==
=== Anime ===
List of dubbing performances in anime
Year	Title	Role	Notes	Source
1985	Robotech	Roy Fokker		
1995	Armitage III	Rene D'Anclaude	OVA, Also Poly Matrix; As Jackson Daniels	
1995	Macross Plus	Yang Neuman	As Jackson Daniels	
1999	Fist of the North Star	Jagi the Pretender		
1999	Outlaw Star	Saiyo Wong	Ep. 22; As Jackson Daniels	
1999	Mobile Suit Gundam 0080: War in the Pocket	Colonel Killing	As Jackson Daniels	
1999	Samurai X	Saito Hajime	Sony dub As Jackson Daniels	
1999-2000	Digimon Adventure	Keisuke Tachikawa		
2000	Arc the Lad	Cougar	As Jackson Daniels	
2000	Dinozaurs	Drago Tyran		
2000	Trigun	Chapel the Evergreen; As Jackson Daniels		
2002	Carried by the Wind: Tsukikage Ran	Officer Nakasaka		
2003	Gun Frontier	Sheriff Kozule		
2003	Heat Guy J	Gene Glen	As Jackson Daniels	
2003	Wild Arms: Twilight Venom	Dennis		
2004	Gungrave	Laguna Glock, others As Jackson Daniels		
2004	Kaze no Yojimbo	Train Conductor, Sorata, Ken, Tanida's Aide		
2004	Yukikaze	Major James Bukhar		
2005	Grenadier	Various characters	As Jackson Daniels	
2005	Kyo Kara Maoh!	Gwendal von Voltaire	As Jackson Daniels	
2005	Paranoia Agent	Takamine, others	As Jackson Daniels	
2005	Naruto	Hidden Mist Ninja, Boatman		
2005	Samurai Champloo	Various characters	As Jackson Daniels	
2006	Gun Sword	Gadved		
2006	Tenchi Muyo! Ryo-Ohki OAV3	Baguma		
2006-14	Bleach	Byakuya Kuchiki		
2007	Tokko	Shogo Muramasa		
2008	Gurren Lagann	Zorthy Kanai		
2008	Strait-Jacket	Gray		
2009-10	Monster	Detective Messner, Hans Georg Schuwald		
2011	Durarara!!	Haruya Shiki		
2013	Digimon Fusion	Wisemon, others		
2013	Fate/Zero	Caster		
2015	Durarara!!×2	Haruya Shiki		
2015	JoJo's Bizarre Adventure	Rudol von Stroheim	As W.T. Falke	
2015	Yo-kai Watch	Jason Forester	(Season 1-2)	
2015	Sword Art Online II	Dyne		
2022-present	Bleach: Thousand-Year Blood War	Byakuya Kuchiki, Chojiro Tadaoki Sasakibe, Young Chojiro Tadaoki Sasakibe		
2024	From Me to You: Kimi ni Todoke	Genji Sanada, Shota's Dad, Joe's dad		
2026	Steel Ball Run: JoJo's Bizarre Adventure	Fritz von Stroheim		

=== Film ===
List of voice performances in direct-to-video and television films
Year	Title	Role	Notes	Source
	Attack of the Super Monsters	Captain Jim Starbuck, Ashtoreth		
1989	Dragonball	Turtle, Soldiers, M.C., Restaurant Owner	Edit of movies of 1 and 3	
1990	Fist of the North Star	Jagi	English version of 1986 film	
1995	Barefoot Gen	Seijo; Enola Gay Crew 3; Yama's Well-Wisher; Bullied Man	film	
1995	Space Adventure Cobra: The Movie	Cobra	Streamline English dub	
2008	Bleach: Memories of Nobody	Byakuya Kuchiki	English dub	
2009	Magnum Farce	Uncle Spilky, Thug 3, Cop 3, (various others)		
2009	Bleach: The DiamondDust Rebellion	Byakuya Kuchiki	English dub	
2011	Bleach: Fade to Black	Byakuya Kuchiki	English dub	
2012	Bleach: Hell Verse	Byakuya Kuchiki	English dub	
2016	Lupin the Third: Jigen's Gravestone	Jigen	English dub	

=== Dubbing ===
List of voice performances in live-action and other dubbing
Year	Title	Role	Notes	Source
	The Adventures of Dynamo Duck	Morris, Bugsy, Manny Mankwrench, Smokey DuBois, Hypnocat		
2001	Power Rangers Time Force	Medicon		
2002	Power Rangers Wild Force	Zen-Aku, Onikage		
2006	Cromartie High - The Movie	Kai Ato		

=== Video games ===
List of voice performances in video games
Year	Title	Role	Notes	Source
2002	Heroes of Might and Magic IV	Tarnum		
2002	Robotech: Battlecry	Roy Fokker		
2003	Dynasty Warriors 4	Lu Bu		
2004	Robotech: Invasion	Silas		
2004	The Bard's Tale	Additional voices		
2006	Dirge of Cerberus: Final Fantasy VII	Incidental characters		
2006	Persona 3	Igor; Shuji Ikutsuki	Also FES, Persona 3 Portable	
2007	Bleach: Shattered Blade	Byakuya Kuchiki		
2008	Persona 4	Igor	Also Golden, Arena	
2008	Final Fantasy IV	Yang		
2009	Klonoa	Balue, Grandpa		
2009	Bleach: The 3rd Phantom	Byakuya Kuchiki		
2011	Marvel vs. Capcom 3: Fate of Two Worlds	Arthur		
2011	Bleach: Soul Resurrección	Byakuya Kuchiki, Rudbornn Chelute		
2015	Xenoblade Chronicles X	Avatar (Cross, Warrior)		
2017	Marvel vs. Capcom: Infinite	Arthur		
2019	Ace Combat 7: Skies Unknown	Colonel D. McKinsey		
2024	Like a Dragon: Infinite Wealth	Additional voices		
2024	The Legend of Heroes: Trails Through Daybreak	Fan Lu, Gaspard Dillon, citizens	as Daniel Woren	
2025	The Legend of Heroes: Trails Through Daybreak II	Fan Lu, citizens	as Daniel Woren	
2025	Like a Dragon: Pirate Yakuza in Hawaii	Additional voices		

- Heroes Chronicles series – Narrator, Tarnum
- Star Wars: Battlefront 2 - Uncredited roles

=== Live action ===
List of acting performances on film and television
Year	Title	Role	Notes	Source
	Shelter from the Storm			
	5 Minutes To Midnight			
	Max		TV Pilot	
1988	Casual Sex?			
1991	Beastmaster 2: Through the Portal of Time			
1993	Renegade	Bartender	Episode: "The Hound"	
1995	Babylon 5	Bartender	Episode: "Confessions and Lamentations"	
1995	Grace Under Fire			
1995	The Granny			
1996	Star Trek: First Contact	Borg		
1997	The Beneficiary			
1998	Night Man	Major Dunn	Episode: "Hitchhiker"	
2011	The Amazing Charleroux		short film	

== Audiobooks ==
List of narrations on audio books
Year	Title Author	Notes	Source
2010	The Invisible Gorilla: And Other Ways Our Intuitions Deceive Us by Christopher Chabris and Daniel Simons	AudioFile Earphone Award	
2012	Hallucinations by Oliver Sacks		
2012	Why Nations Fail : the origins of power, prosperity and poverty by Daron Acemoglu and James A. Robinson		
2013	Trust Works!: Four Keys to Building Lasting Relationships by Ken Blanchard, Cynthia Olmstead, and Martha Lawrence	AudioFile Earphone Award	
2014	Go Wild: Free Your Body and Mind from the Afflictions of Civilization by John J. Ratey and Richard Manning	AudioFile Earphone Award in Non-Fiction & Culture	
2014	The Misadventures of the Family Fletcher by Dana Allison Levy	AudioFile Earphone Award in Children & Family Listening	
2014	Toms River: A Story of Science and Salvation by Dan Fagin		
