= Steve Staley =

American voice actor

- Other name: Steve Cannon
- Occupations: Voice actor and ADR director
- Years active: 1998–present
- Agent: William Morris Endeavor
- Children: 2

Steve Staley, also known as Steve Cannon, is an American voice actor known for providing voices for Japanese anime and video games. Some of his notable roles include Shūhei Hisagi and Tōshirō Hitsugaya in Bleach, Daisuke Aurora in Heat Guy J, Shiro Amada in Mobile Suit Gundam: The 08th MS Team, Moondoggie in Eureka Seven, Kadaj in Final Fantasy VII: Advent Children, Neji Hyuga and Shibuki in Naruto and Eiji Kikumaru in The Prince of Tennis.

== Filmography ==
=== Animated series English dubbing ===
List of English dubbing performances in animated series
Year	Title	Role	Notes	Source
2001	Hand Maid May	Kazuya Saotome	As Steve Canden	CA
2001–02	Mobile Suit Gundam: The 08th MS Team	Shiro Amada	OVA series As Steve Cannon	CA
2001	Digimon Tamers	Ryo Akiyama, Justimon	Shared with Lex Lang	
2002	Devadasy	Kei	Also OVA	CA
2002	Magic Knight Rayearth	Master Mage Clef	As Steve Cannon	
2002	Digimon Frontier	Koji Minamoto		CA
2002	X	Kamui Shiro	As Steve Cannon	Press
2003	Argento Soma	Takuto Kaneshiro, Ryu Soma		CA
2003	If I See You in My Dreams	Masou Fuguno	Also OVA	CA
2003	Heat Guy J	Daisuke Aurora	As Steve Cannon	CA
2004	Eight Clouds Rising	Kuraki Fuzuchi	Also OVA as Steve Cannon	CA
2004	Fighting Spirit	Ippo Makunouchi	As Steve Cannon	CA
2004	I'll CKBC	Gaku Takayanagi	Also OVA as Steve Cannon	CA
2004	Tsukihime, Lunar Legend	Shiki Tohno	As Steve Cannon	CA
2004	Yukikaze	Rei Fukai	Also OVA	CA
2005	Battle B-Daman	Enjyu		
2005	Scrapped Princess	Christopher Armalite		
2005–09	Naruto	Neji Hyuga		Press
2005	Fafner in the Azure	Soushi Minashiro	As Steve Cannon	Press
2005	Saiyuki Reload	Cho Hakkai	As Steve Cannon	CA
2006	Karas: The Prophecy	Otoha		CA
2006	Saiyuki Reload Gunlock	Cho Hakkai	As Steve Cannon	CA
2006	Kannazuki no Miko	Soma Ogami	As Steve Cannon	
2006–14	Bleach	Tōshirō Hitsugaya, Shuhei Hisagi	As Steve Cannon	
2007–08	The Prince of Tennis	Eiji Kikumaru	Viz Media dub	
2007	The Third: The Girl with the Blue Eye	Iks	As Steve Cannon	
2008	Buso Renkin	Kazuki Muto	As Steve Cannon	
2008	Moribito: Guardian of the Spirit	Shuga	As Steve Cannon	
2008	Gurren Lagann	Cytomander		CA
2009–17	Naruto: Shippuden	Neji Hyuga		Press
2010	Vampire Knight	Senri Shiki	As Steve Cannon	
2010–14	Mobile Suit Gundam Unicorn	Banagher Links	As Steve Cannon	
2011	Marvel Anime: X-Men	Takeo Sasaki		
2013	B-Daman CrossFire	Novu Moru	As Steve Cannon	
2013	K	Himori Akiyama	As Steve Cannon	
2014–15	Kill la Kill	Houka Inumuta	Also OVA as Steve Cannon	
2014–15	Rock Lee & His Ninja Pals	Neji Hyuga	As Steve Cannon	
2015	Sailor Moon	Rubeus	Viz dub as Steve Cannon	
2016	Sailor Moon Crystal	Rubeus	As Steve Cannon	
2016	Cyborg 009 VS Devilman	Cyborg 008	OVA series	
2016–17	Mobile Suit Gundam: Iron-Blooded Orphans	McGillis Fareed	As Steve Cannon	
2017	Berserk	Griffith/Femto	2016 series; as Steve Cannon	
2018	Sword Gai: The Animation	Issei Ariga	As Steve Cannon; Dialogue director	
2018	A.I.C.O -Incarnation-	Hori	Bang Zoom dub as Steve Cannon; Dialogue director	
2019	Gundam Build Divers	Kozy		
2019	Sword Art Online	Raios Antinous	Season 3; as Steve Cannon	
2019–23	Bungo Stray Dogs	Katai Tayama	As Steve Cannon	
2019	Pucca	Linguin, Fyah	As Steve Canden	
2021	Boruto: Naruto Next Generations	Neji Hyuga		
2022	The Prince of Tennis II U-17 World Cup	Rocky Meredith	As Steve Cannon	
2022–present	Bleach: Thousand-Year Blood War	Toshiro Hitsugaya, Shuhei Hisagi		

=== Animation ===
List of voice performances in animation
Year	Title	Role	Notes	Source
2011–14	Secret Millionaires Club	Jones		
2015	DC Super Friends	Riddler	Web series	
2020	Alien Xmas	Panicked Elf	TV Special	

=== Film English dubbing ===
List of English dubbing performances in direct-to-video and television films
Year	Title	Role	Notes	Source
2004	Mobile Suit Gundam F91	Seabook Arno		CA
2005	Digimon Tamers: Runaway Locomon	Ryo Akiyama		
2005	Digimon Frontier: Island of Lost Digimon	Koji Minamoto		
2006	Final Fantasy VII: Advent Children	Kadaj		
2012	Monster High: Ghouls Rule	Chad, Kid 1		
2019	Mobile Suit Gundam Narrative	Banagher Links		

=== Live action series English dubbing ===
List of English dubbing performances in live action series
Year	Title	Country	Dubbed from	Role	Live Actor	Source
2016	Marseille	France	French	Alain Costabone	Lionel Erdogan	

=== Video games ===
List of voice and English dubbing performances in video games
Year	Title	Role	Notes	Source
2002	The Lord of the Rings: The Fellowship of the Ring	Frodo Baggins, Celeborn		
2002	Whacked!	Otto		
2006–present	Naruto video games	Neji Hyuga	English dub	
2007–present	Bleach video games	Toshiro Hitsugaya	English dub	
2007	Blue Dragon	Jiro, Raging Kesu	English dub	
2007	Mass Effect	Officer Eddie Lang	English dub	
2013	Final Fantasy XIV	Papalymo	English dub	
2019	Kill la Kill the Game: IF	Houka Inumuta	English dub	
2025	Digimon Story: Time Stranger	Additional voices	English dub	

=== Live-action roles ===
List of acting performances in film and television
Year	Title	Role	Notes	Source
1998	Ringmaster	Additional Voices		
2003	Down With Love			
	Where in Time is Carmen Sandiego	Shadow Spider (role)		
