= Tōshirō Hitsugaya =

Fictional character from Bleach

- Bleach character
- Tōshirō Hitsugaya as drawn by Tite Kubo
- First appearance: Bleach chapter 81: "Twelve Tone Rendezvous" (2003)
- Created by: Tite Kubo
- Voiced by: Japanese: Romi Park; Yuki Kaji (adult form, anime); English: Steve Staley

In-universe information
- Species: Soul Reaper

Tōshirō Hitsugaya (Japanese: 日番谷 冬獅郎, Hepburn: Hitsugaya Tōshirō) is a fictional character in the manga and anime series Bleach, created by Tite Kubo. In the series, Hitsugaya is a captain of the 10th division or squad of the Gotei 13, a group of Soul Reapers who govern the flow of souls and protect Soul Society, an afterlife realm. Hitsugaya makes appearances in all Bleach's films, being the protagonist in Bleach: The Diamond Dust Rebellion, and in other media related to the series, including video games and original video animations.

Hitsugaya has been well received among both readers and reviewers. Amongst the Bleach reader base, he has been highly popular, placing high in several popularity polls. Several pieces of merchandise have been released in his likeness, including action figures, plush toys and key chains. Anime and manga publications have provided acclaim and criticism of Hitsugaya's character.

== Appearances ==
=== Manga and anime ===
Hitsugaya lived with his grandmother and with Momo Hinamori, whom he considers a very close friend. Hitsugaya excelled in the Soul Reaper academy, becoming the youngest captain in the history of Soul Society with command over Squad 10. Introduced to the Gotei 13, Hitsugaya suspected Squad 3 captain Gin Ichimaru of foul play as the circumstances surrounding the coming execution of Rukia Kuchiki become more complicated. When Hinamori is manipulated into thinking that Hitsugaya killed Sousuke Aizen, Hitsugaya attacks Gin on the notion that he tricked her. The fight is interrupted when Hitsugaya incapacitates Hinamori, only to be intercepted by his lieutenant Rangiku Matsumoto. Seeing how destructive Rukia's execution is becoming, Hitsugaya tries to stop it by appealing to the Chamber 46, only to discover all members were killed by Aizen, who faked his death. When Hitsugaya discovers Hinamori injured, Hitsugaya tries to kill Aizen but is defeated.

In a later arc, Hitsugaya leads a group of Soul Reapers assigned to defend Karakura Town against the Arrancar that Aizen has enlisted to his cause. He defeats Shawlong Qufang, and Luppi Antenor, and upon learning that Orihime Inoue has followed the Arrancars back to their home world, Hitsugaya returns to Soul Society to help in the preparation for the war against Aizen. At Karakura Town, he engages the Espada Tier Halibel before she is mortally wounded by Aizen. From there, Hitsugaya engages Aizen, and is tricked into stabs Momo in the chest with Aizen taking advantage of the youth's rage of being tricked to cut his left limbs off. After Aizen's defeat and healed, Hitsugaya resolves to train so that he can more freely use his strongest move as a Soul Reaper, bankai, to protect Hinamori.

When Kugo Ginjo takes all of Ichigo Kurosaki's Fullbring powers, Hitsugaya and several other high-ranking Soul Reapers appear in the human world. To help Ichigo regain his Soul Reaper powers and combat Ginjo, captain-commander Genryūsai Shigekuni Yamamoto orders the Soul Reapers to give Ichigo some of their spirit energy. Hitsugaya then engages the Fullbringer Yukio Hans Vorarlbena in a cat-and-mouse game, ending with Hitsugaya encasing Yukio in ice, threatening to end his life if he does not release his Fullbring. During the Wandenreich invasion of Soul Society, Hitsugaya loses his bankai to the organization's member Cang Du. But with the help of Kisuke Urahara, Hitsugaya retrieves his bankai from Cang Du and defeat him. However, Hitsugaya ends up as a zombie under the Sternritter Giselle Gewelle. Hitsugaya appears along with a zomified Rangiku, as they, Kensei and Rose fight Mayuri Kurotsuchi's group of revived Arrancars and Squad 11's Ikkaku and Yumichika. Eventually, Mayuri manages to take control of the zombified Soul Reapers with Hitsugaya and Rangiku restored to normal and healed, although their lifespans were shortened. Hitsugaya later joins Byakuya and other Soul Reapers against the sternritter, Gerard. During this battle, the ice petals of Hitsugaya's bankai dissolve. But instead of his bankai deactivating, revealing that the time limit was a sign that it was fully developed prior to the fight, Daiguren Hyōrinmaru's power reaches its full potential while Hitsugaya is transformed into a young adult to better utilize his improved weapon.

=== In other media ===
He appears in all four films in the series. He fights the Dark Ones with other Soul Reaper comrades in Bleach: Memories of Nobody. Toshiro appears in Bleach: The DiamondDust Rebellion, where he is accused of stealing the King's Seal, an ancient artifact, and stumbles across a dark secret concerning a long-dead Soul Reaper named Sōjirō Kusaka, who was his close friend and rival when he was younger. A one-shot manga chapter focusing on Histugaya's past was released to promote the film, revealing how Hitsugaya learned of his powers. Apparently, Kusaka uses the King's Seal to come back to life for revenge, but in the end is killed by Hitsugaya in a final rematch. He also appears in Bleach: Fade to Black, in which he loses his memories of Ichigo and Rukia, along with the other Soul Reapers. After losing his memories about Rukia's disappearance and Ichigo, Hitsugaya along with other captains try to stop Ichigo from entering the Soul Society. In Hell Verse, he appears to help fight off the Sinners in Karakura Town.

Hitsugaya is featured in the 30 minute original video animation, Sealed Sword Frenzy, in which he is part of the group of captains sent to the real world to seal away the escaped and notoriously dangerous shinigami criminal, Baishin. During their first encounter, he successfully fends off the criminal, though Baishin escapes. Hitsugaya is a common playable character in Bleach-related video game, including the Blade Battlers series and the Nintendo home consoles series. Special versions of the character such his bankai form is featured in some games such Soul Resurrección, and Hitsugaya in a school costume are unlockable in other games such as Bleach: Shattered Blade. He is also a playable character in the Nintendo DS game, Jump Ultimate Stars. He also appears in two Bleach Beat Collection albums aside. The first one was a compilation album with Hinamori and Matsumoto. The second one was also a compilation album, this time with Ichigo. A Hitsugaya and Hyōrinmaru's album was also released as part of Bleach Breathless Collection. He was initially portrayed by Takashi Nagayama in the Bleach rock musicals. Later, in Shinsei Rock Musical Bleach Reprise, Nagayama was replaced by Yūya Kido, who also was substituted; Takuya Kawaharada took the role.

== Reception ==
Hitsugaya has been highly popular in the Weekly Shōnen Jump's Bleach popularity polls ranking most of the times within the top ten. In early 2008, Hitsugaya was voted the most popular character in the series, replacing Ichigo, who had previously held the position. Hyōrinmaru was voted the most popular zanpakutō in the zanpakutō popularity poll of the series. In the 2007 Japanese Newtype magazine character polls, he was voted the 9th most popular male character in any anime. In the 28th Annual Animage Readers' Poll, Anime Grand Prix, Hitsugaya was voted as the eighth most popular male anime character. He has also been featured in similar Animage monthly polls. Hitsugaya ranked eighth in 2008 and third in 2009 in a survey titled "The Character I Want to Be My Groom" from the Japanese music distributor Recochoku. In order to promote the second film of Bleach, the trailer had the line "Execute Hitsugaya!". Kubo admitted that it was his own idea to make everybody be surprised, but he and Masakazu Morita, the voice actor of Ichigo, received a lot of letters from worried fans, causing Kubo to apologize in response. Various merchandise based on Hitsugaya's appearance has been created, including action figures, plush toys and key chains.

Various publications from manga, anime and other media have commented on Hitsugaya's character adding praise and criticism. He has been noted to be one of the most common "fan favorite" characters from the series. Carl Kimlinger from Anime News Network praised Steve Staley for giving an interesting variation of his voice rather than "integrity-destroying abominations". Also, he commented that Hitsugaya's unresolved personal issue is, along with the ones from others characters, a good part from the climax of the Soul Society story arc. He additionally praised the animation of Hitsugaya's bankai in the anime. Later, however, Kimlinger criticized it as "it makes him look like an arthritic blue crow". IGN's Ramsey Isler lamented the fact that his first fight against an Arrancar was not very entertaining and his character did not "get a chance to shine." Hitsugaya's early appearances were criticized by Isaac Hale from Pop Culture Shock who found Kubo was ignoring other characters and giving a lot of attention to him and Matsumoto's gags. However, in a later arc, Chris Beveridge of Mania Entertainment noted he "has a pretty good arc" and "shine[s] brightly" facing Aizen. His appearance in DiamondDust Rebellion were praised by Active Anime's Holly Ellingwood who found his motivations and back story "involving and intriguing". Similarly, Chris Beveridge from Mania Entertainment praised "how he stands as a man" on this film.
