= Yoruichi Shihōin =

- Bleach character
- Yoruichi Shihōin as illustrated by Tite Kubo
- First appearance: Bleach chapter 51: "DEATH 3" (2002)
- Created by: Tite Kubo
- Voiced by: English: Wendee Lee (human form; Episodes 41–366 and 390–present) Anairis Quiñones (Note: Quiñones was removed as Yoruichi in favor of returning original voice actor Wendee Lee) (human form; Episode 388 only) Terrence Stone (cat form); Japanese: Satsuki Yukino (human form) Shirō Saitō (cat form)

In-universe information
- Species: Soul Reaper; Werecat
- Gender: Female
- Title(s): Shihōin Clan Head (former); Goddess of Flash
- Occupation: 2nd Division Soul Reaper Captain (former); Commander of the Secret Mobile Corps; Corps Commander of the Executive Militia
- Family: Yūshirō Shihōin (younger brother)

Yoruichi Shihōin (Japanese: 四楓院 夜一, Hepburn: Shihōin Yoruichi) is a fictional character in the anime and manga series Bleach created by Tite Kubo. She served as captain of the 2nd Division of the Gotei 13 and as commander of the Onmitsukidō.

== Character outline ==
Yoruichi Shihōin is a woman who has the ability to transform into a black cat for long periods of time. She is intelligent and witty, and is intimately knowledgeable of Soul Society and its workings, as she was the former leader of the Stealth Forces and the 2nd division captain. Although of noble birth, she acts differently from other nobles. For instance, she instructed a young Soifon to call her by her first name instead of by her title, but reluctantly settled for being called "Yoruichi-sama" ("Lady Yoruichi" in the dub). Another note of her eccentricity is that she speaks in a dialect that elders use, such as identifying herself as 'washi' (a term that usually old men define themselves with) instead of more feminine terms like 'watashi' in both her human and animal forms (though specifically for the Japanese version).

Much like Kisuke Urahara, Yoruichi tends to avoid battles, preferring to help after a fight is over or even often observing situations from afar, but she will step in if she thinks her side cannot otherwise win. She was responsible for training Chad and Orihime prior to their entrance into Soul Society. She also supervised Ichigo Kurosaki's bankai training using the methods developed by Kisuke Urahara.

According to Tite Kubo, the author of Bleach, Yoruichi prefers to drink milk, which fits in with her practice of transforming into a cat, most of the time.

== Appearances ==
Yoruichi is the former captain of the 2nd Division, the former General Administrator Commander (総司令官, Sōshireikan) of the Stealth Forces (隠密機動, Onmitsukidō; literally "Hidden Secret Movements Organization"), and the former Corps Commander (軍団長, Gundanchō) of the Executive Militia (刑軍, Keigun), a sub-division of the Stealth Forces. She is also the first female and the 22nd generational head of the Shihōin family (天賜兵装番, tenshiheisōban), one of the four noble families, and earned much respect in Soul Society while she was there. While her age has not been revealed, she is older than Byakuya Kuchiki and refers to him as "Little Byakuya" since he was a kid. He called her "demon cat", and thought of himself as better than her in spite of her high status and rank; as a result, she was easily able to provoke him with her pranks. Yoruichi and Kisuke Urahara are best friends; as children, they played together every day under the Sōkyoku hill, in the training space that Urahara built when they were children, and later used the area to train together. Urahara also served under her command in 2nd Division as third seat before she recommended him for the position of the captain of 12th Division.

While Yoruichi was the stealth forces commander, she took in Soifon as a guard and became her mentor and friend. She taught Soifon most of the techniques she knew. As a result, Soifon succeeded her as head of the stealth forces after Yoruichi's escape from Soul Society. During her time in Soul Society, she created many techniques that involve flash steps, and taught some of them to Byakuya.

A century prior to the Bleach storyline, she helped Urahara, Tessai, and the Visoreds in their escape from Soul Society and abandoned her high status.

Yoruichi first appears in feline form to deliver a warning to Urahara about the Soul Society setting out to capture Rukia Kuchiki. After Rukia's capture, she helps train Orihime Inoue and Yasutora Sado to control their powers. She leads Ichigo's group into Soul Society when they attempt to save Rukia, and then to Kūkaku Shiba when they were unable to enter through the Seireitei gates. After being separated from the group, Yoruichi collected information on Rukia's execution. She also rescues Ichigo from being injured by Byakuya's shikai and claims that he cannot fight as he is; she works to teach Ichigo the bankai of his zanpakutō using a technique developed by Urahara. Later, Yoruichi battles with Soifon, although with some struggle in the beginning. When Yoruichi reveals that she also is able to use shunko, Soifon is overcome with rage, and soon defeated. She cries and asks Yoruichi why she left her behind. Though the explanation is not shown, the two are reconciled. After Aizen's treachery is revealed, Yoruichi and Soifon capture and restrain him, but he and his accomplices escape via negacion. Yoruichi returns to the human world with Ichigo and his friends.

Yoruichi, alongside Soifon, later actively begin to pursue the Bount once they learn of the Bount's plan to invade Soul Society, and also saves Ichigo when he is unable to defeat Jin Kariya. Yoruichi also rescued the Bount Koga Gō and took him to the home of Ran'tao, the Bount's creator, where he was nursed back to health.

Subsequently, Yoruichi and Urahara rescue Ichigo from death at the hands of the arrancar Yammy. Though she appears to easily defeat Yammy, it becomes apparent from her injuries afterward that her opponent was stronger than she expected due to his tough skin. She appears again to take Orihime to the training room under Urahara's shop to prevent Aizen from gaining interest in her abilities.

== Abilities ==
One of her unique abilities is that she can shapeshift into a black cat at will. In her cat form, Yoruichi can channel spiritual power and move with incredible speeds, though she is physically limited by the form. Her transformation also allows her a complete disguise in multiple ways; aside from the physical transformation, her voice as a cat is deep enough for most to assume that she is male.

Yoruichi is also highly skilled in the use of flash steps (瞬歩, shunpo), a high speed movement ability. Though this is by no means a unique skill, as most seated officers are capable of performing it to various degrees, Yoruichi holds the title Goddess of Flash (瞬神, shunshin; English: "Flash Master") because she has mastered this ability to such an extent that she can appear to be in several places at once and wipe out entire stealth forces squadrons in moments. The full extent of her abilities remain unclear, but she was able to outrun Byakuya while carrying an unconscious Ichigo over her shoulder. She was able to perform around 300 steps before feeling out of breath; she states that it must be the result of being out of practice after doing so.

Yoruichi is also skilled with flash release (瞬閧, shunkō), a technique that combines hand-to-hand combat and kidō. It concentrates high-pressure kidō energy around the body, allowing it to be fired at opponents.

Yoruichi also taught Byakuya some techniques of her own creation involving flash steps, including one called utsusemi (空蝉, lit. cicada, in reference to their molting) which allows a person to move out of harm's way by creating another image of themselves. Yoruichi used a similar technique in her short battle with Byakuya, creating an image of her which was sliced by Byakuya, but appearing a split second later unharmed.

Two of Yoruichi's unique items are accessories that allow the user the power of flight. One is a small wand with a skull atop it. By channeling spirit energy into the wand, it produces a tentacle that acts as a harness and a single, bat-shaped wing that acts as a one-handed hang glider. No skill or previous experience is required to use it. The other, known as a tentōken (天踏絢, lit. heavenly dancing figure), is a brown mantle with a large draw string closure at the collar and a large brooch displaying the Shihōin family crest. Like the wand, the tentōken seems to require no skill or previous experience to use. It also seems to be superior to the wand, since it allows one to hover in mid-air and doesn't immobilize one of the user's hands.

Another item, though not in Yoruichi's possession, is the device used by Jūshirō Ukitake and Shunsui Kyōraku to destroy the Sōkyoku. It is a large, shield-like item with the Shihōin family crest stamped on it and a long cord connected to it. When the cord is wrapped around Sōkyoku and two zanpakutō are stabbed into two vertical slots running from its top, their energy flows through the cord and destroys Sōkyoku. Jūshirō Ukitake had it in his possession under some sort of seal.

=== Zanpakutō ===
It is known that Yoruichi possesses a zanpakutō, but she relies nearly exclusively on hand-to-hand combat, shunkō and flash steps. However, although she never carries it during the main storyline, it is shown during a flashback when she tells Ichigo about Kisuke Urahara as the previous 12th division captain. She briefly uses a sword during the "Sealed Sword Frenzy" OVA to dispatch a hollow. She also uses it in the anime during Soifon's flashback about becoming Yoruichi's protégé, where it resembles a kodachi or wakizashi. In this scene, she is shown to have worn her zanpakutō horizontally down her back, in a similar fashion to how Soifon carries her own zanpakutō.

== Reception ==
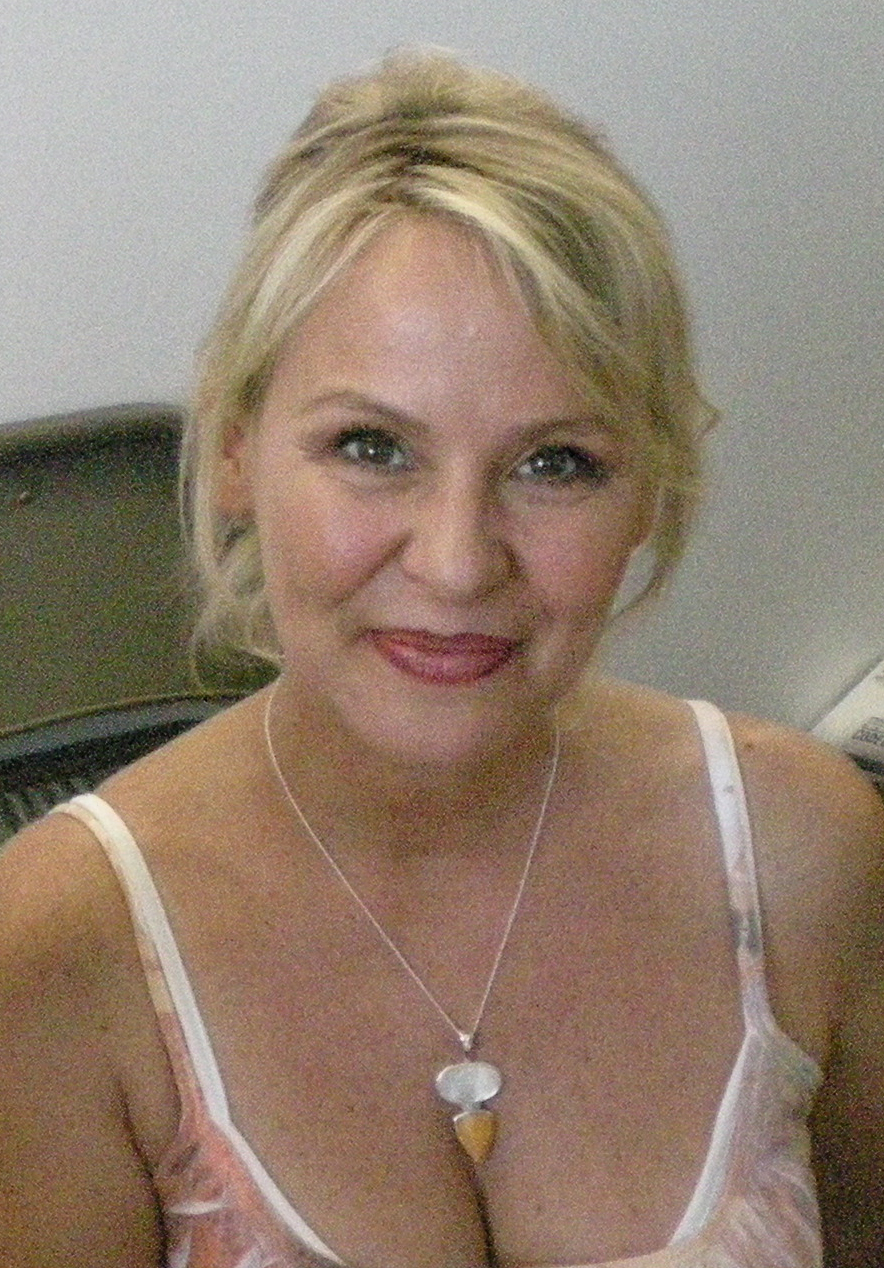
Wendee Lee voices Yoruichi in the anime's English dub.

=== Popularity ===
In the 3rd popularity poll for Bleach, Yoruichi had placed at 7th with 3,744 votes, behind Byakuya Kuchiki with 3,752, and surpassing Kisuke Urahara by 68 votes.

=== Critical response ===
Louis Kemner writing for Comic Book Resources described Yoruichi as Soul Society's "rogue hero", who cares about "doing the right thing, at any cost".

=== 2023 casting controversy ===
Following Bleach: Thousand-Year Blood War second cour's final dubbed episode on October 21, 2023, voice actress Anairis Quiñones confirmed that her role as Yoruichi Shihōin was recast, with Wendee Lee reprising the role instead. The recast had sparked uproar and debate on social media platforms about on one hand, Lee replacing Quiñones, an actress of color, in order to voice a person of color, and on the other hand, Lee getting replaced in the first place.

== Analysis ==
Cortés Reslie discussed Yoruichi in the context of gender in anime, noting that she transgresses gender boundaries and the border between humans and animals. Her ability to transform into a cat allows her to "escape sexual objectification in her animal form", while her "status as a fugitive and outlaw constructs her animalistic body as a site of rebellion against the patriarchal order of the Gotei 13". She also describes the relationship between Yoruichi and Suì Fēng as "the most richly described romantic (but not sexual) relationship in the series". Neither woman is portrayed as ethnically Japanese; Suì Fēng is Chinese whereas Yoruichi, despite having a Japanese name, has dark skin and golden eyes. However, Cortés Reslie also notes that their relationship, in which Suì Fēng is subservient to Yoruichi both on professional and personal level, "reflects real life global power dynamics between China and Japan".
