= Byakuya Kuchiki =

Fictional character from Bleach

- Bleach character
- Byakuya Kuchiki as depicted on the cover for Volume 7
- First appearance: Bleach chapter 51: "DEATH 3" (2002)
- Created by: Tite Kubo
- Portrayed by: Miyavi
- Voiced by: Japanese; Ryōtarō Okiayu; English; Dan Woren; Greg Chun (live-action film)

In-universe information
- Family: Soujun Kuchiki (father, deceased); Unnamed mother (deceased); Rukia Kuchiki (sister-in-law, adoptive sister)
- Spouses: Hisana Kuchiki (wife, deceased)
- Relatives: Ginrei Kuchiki (grandfather); Renji Abarai (brother-in-law); Ichika Abarai (niece)

Byakuya Kuchiki (Japanese: 朽木 白哉, Hepburn: Kuchiki Byakuya) is a fictional character in the anime and manga series Bleach created by Tite Kubo. He is the captain of the Sixth Division for Gotei 13 and Rukia's brother. His vice-captain is Renji Abarai.

== Character outline ==
Byakuya is the 28th head of the noble Kuchiki clan, one of the four great noble families in Soul Society. As such, he acts in an aristocratic manner — he seems always serene and apathetic towards other people, even when he is actually deeply conflicted. He is also extremely calm, even in battle, and is rarely surprised by even the most drastic of actions. At a young age, he is a little joyful, as noted by his grandfather, Ginrei.

He believes in law and order. As the head of one of the great noble families and as a captain in the Gotei 13, he always works hard for a peaceful society. He thinks that if someone in his position does not follow the rules as a good example, then no one will follow them. He believes that to maintain order, all law-breakers must be punished, even if that goes against his own wishes. Despite his icy and regal manner, Byakuya cares for and protects those important to him, even referring to Rukia, his adopted younger sister, as his "pride".

Byakuya is popular among female Soul Reapers and was voted number one in the "captain we desire to release a photo book for" poll taken by the Soul Reaper Women's Association. He likes Japanese cherry blossoms, night-time walks, spicy food, and bananas, but he dislikes sweets.

He wears the standard captain uniform along with a white headpiece called a kenseikan (symbolizing his noble rank as the head of the Kuchiki family) and a white scarf made by the master weaver, Tsujishirō Kuroemon III. The scarf is made from silver-white windflower light silk (ginpaku kazahana no uzuginu) and is a family heirloom handed down through the generations to the head of the Kuchiki family. Forty five houses can be built for the cost of just one such scarf.

Despite his extremely serious personality, Byakuya seems to have a funny side to himself. He not only attends the lieutenants' meeting when Renji is absent, but it is also implied that he attends the meetings of the Soul Reaper Women's Association when Rukia is absent. In the former's case, he reasons that "part of a captain's responsibilities is to make sure the lieutenant's responsibilities are taken care of;" When Renji asks him if he also goes to Rukia's meetings, Byakuya responds only by smiling. On other occasions, Byakuya has jokingly remarked that he uses Senbonzakura to cut his hair and has claimed that life in general is not supposed to be entertaining, and even makes up an idea for a game that is not meant to be amusing. His artistic talent is similar to Rukia's (that is, non-existent); it appears that only Rukia is impressed with his abilities and deeply admires his style. Byakuya prefers formality when he is addressed. He is referred to by title or his full name by everyone except family, his seniors on rare occasions and Ichigo. He initially protested Ichigo calling him by only his first name and has continued to pointedly refer to Ichigo formally as "Kurosaki Ichigo" since instead of reciprocating the casual first-name address.

== History ==
Little is known about his early history. When his grandfather, Ginrei, was still the captain of the 6th Division, the teenage Byakuya was training laboriously to succeed him as head of the clan, although Ginrei was worried about his rash and hotheaded attitude. During this time Yoruichi Shihouin would play pranks on him and goad him into games of tag using flash steps, which she won every time. Byakuya at this time would very easily lose his temper, and his grandfather believed he would become much stronger if he would learn to control himself. This aspect of his personality is reflected in Senbonzakura when he manifests in the Zanpakutou rebellion arc.

Over fifty years before the main storyline, Byakuya married Hisana, a commoner from Inuzuri, one of the poorest districts of Rukongai; in doing so, he broke the rules by accepting her into the noble Kuchiki family. Shortly before her death from illness, Hisana asked Byakuya to find, adopt, and protect her biological sister, Rukia, whom she had abandoned as a baby. She also made him promise that he would not tell Rukia about her real family. She believed that as she abandoned Rukia when she was younger she was not worthy to be called Rukia's sister, but asked Byakuya to allow her to call him 'brother'.

A year later, during Rukia's time at the academy, Byakuya found her and immediately adopted her into the Kuchiki clan. By adopting her, Byakuya respected his wife's last wish, but had broken the rules of his clan again. He later swore upon his parents' graves that he would never break the rules again, no matter what. As a result, he, though entirely apathetic on the surface, is actually deeply conflicted with the matter of Rukia's execution. Should he intervene, it would require breaking the promise to his parents and the rules again; but should he do nothing he would fail to fulfill the last promise he made to his dying wife to protect Rukia as his own sister.

It is implied that Byakuya became a captain of the 6th division about 50 years before the main Bleach storyline (shortly before Rukia had entered the Gotei 13). Gin Ichimaru became captain of the 3rd Division at the same time, and Gin would commonly start pointless conversations with Byakuya during times they crossed paths.

== Synopsis ==
Byakuya first appears on a mission with his lieutenant, Renji Abarai, to capture Rukia Kuchiki and kill Ichigo Kurosaki. They succeeded in retrieving Rukia, and spared Ichigo, if not for Rukia's intervention, pleading for Byakuya not to give the finishing blow. Byakuya later interrupts Ganju Shiba and Hanatarō Yamada's attempt to rescue Rukia and, later on, Renji's attempt to do the same. He then fights Ichigo for the third time. Following Ichigo's inner hollow's forced submission, both focus their remaining power into one final attack, resulting in a tie. At the end of the battle, Byakuya, through their conversation, realizes that what Ichigo has fought against is the law of Soul Society instead of Byakuya himself, after which he gives his word to protect Rukia. When Sousuke Aizen orders Gin Ichimaru to kill Rukia, Byakuya intervenes and is overwhelmed by Gin. While being treated, Byakuya tells Rukia why she was adopted, apologizes to her, and thanks Ichigo. Afterwards, Byakuya's attitude toward Rukia changes significantly. He is seen to care for Rukia in an indirect manner and displays a new view on the idea that the law is never perfect.

Byakuya reappears to retrieve Tōshirō Hitsugaya's team on General Yamamoto's order near the end of the Arrancar Arc, but he secretly assigns Rukia and Renji to rescue Orihime. He reasons that he was only ordered to bring them back to Soul Society and that what they chose to do afterwards was none of his concern, though Ichigo and Rukia suspect otherwise. Byakuya appears later in Hueco Mundo to save Rukia from the 7th Espada, Zommari Leroux. Afterwards, he appears with Kenpachi Zaraki to save Ichigo in his fight against the Cero Espada Yammy.

Seventeen months later, Byakuya and several other high-ranking Soul Reapers appear before Ichigo in the human world after Ichigo is robbed of his Fullbring. It is revealed that he and the accompanying Soul Reapers channeled their power into the blade that stabbed Ichigo to restore his lost Soul Reaper powers. Byakuya subsequently fights Shūkurō Tsukishima.

When the Wandenreich invades the Soul Society, Byakuya mourns Lieutenant Chōjirō Sasakibe. Byakuya assists Renji on fighting Stern Ritter F, Äs Nödt. Byakuya activates his Bankai, tells Renji to observe Äs and finds out a way to unseal it after it is sealed. However, Byakuya learns that his Bankai was not sealed, but stolen by the Quincy. Byakuya clashes with Äs, but is easily overwhelmed. Äs Nödt finishes Byakuya off by using his own Bankai against him and smashing him into a nearby wall. When Ichigo breaks free of his imprisonment in the Dangai and arrives at the spot where Byakuya lays wounded, Byakuya asks Ichigo to forgive him for his failure to defeat his enemy and begs him to protect the Soul Society as his dying wish. After the Wandenreich leave, the Royal Guard arrives in the Soul Society, bringing Byakuya with them so that he can be healed. He later returns to the Soul Society sufficiently healed with his strength increased, arriving during Rukia's battle with Äs Nödt. Acknowledging Rukia's growth, he dismisses Äs Nödt's assumption that Byakuya will fight him and instead encourages Rukia to finish Äs Nödt with her own new abilities. After defeating Äs Nödt with her Bankai, Byakuya praises her Bankai but warns her to return to her normal state slowly, commenting on the dangerous nature of her Bankai requiring her to turn her entire body into ice in the process. He subsequently joins Renji, Rukia, and other Soul Reapers to fight against the Wandenreich, tasked with preventing Ichigo from reaching the Soul King's palace. However, the Soul Reapers are overwhelmed by Wandenreich Schutzstaffel Gerard Valkyrie, who grows in size each time he is cut down by the power of "miracles." He orders Rukia and Renji to go join Ichigo at the Soul King's palace, while Byakuya, Toshiro Hitsugaya, and Kenpachi Zaraki continue to try and subdue Gerard Valkyrie.

Ten years later, Byakuya remains the captain of the Sixth Division ten years after Yhwach's apparent destruction and is present during Rukia's promotion as the new captain of the Thirteenth Division. Upon realizing that Yhwach's presence is still lingering in the Soul Society, he elects not to tell Rukia and Renji so that they can visit Ichigo in the human world, and decides to join Mayuri Kurotsuchi and Soifon in disposing of Yhwach's presence. However, they witness the presence abruptly disappear, unaware that Yhwach was dispelled when Yhwach's presence also appeared in the living world and came into contact with Kazui Kurosaki, the son of Ichigo and Orihime Inoue.

== Abilities ==
As a captain of the Gotei 13, Byakuya is extremely skilled in all forms of Soul Reaper combat. In keeping with his rank, Byakuya's abilities allow him to defeat opponents of captain-level ability without much effort. He holds the Advanced-Captain class within the Gotei 13.

Of particular note is Byakuya's speed: he is skilled in the use of shunpo (Flash steps), having trained with (but never surpassed) Yoruichi Shihōin. Yoruichi also taught Byakuya some techniques of her own creation that involved flash steps, including one called utsusemi (空蝉, lit. Cast-Off Cicada Shell, in reference to their molting), which allows Byakuya to move out of harm's way while leaving an after-image behind. One of Byakuya's favorite techniques, as described by Renji, is Senka (闪花, lit. Flash Blossom), a flash step combined with a spin to quickly move behind the enemy, followed by a combination of two quick thrusts to destroy the opponent's soul chain and soul sleep in one move, destroying the opponent's source of spiritual power. He manages to quickly dispatch Ichigo in their first encounter with this technique. In his battle with Zommari Leroux, he is able to maintain his composure and fight at full speed, despite being forced to cut the tendons in his left leg and arm to prevent Zommari from gaining control of them.

As Byakuya has displayed knowledge of high level kidō spells, and can cast spells up to number 81 without the incantation. He is adept at using them tactically, such as disrupting the movement of Renji's Bankai with a well-timed fire spell and damaging Ichigo's right arm by using a low-level lightning spell at point-blank range to burn a hole through his shoulder.

=== Senbonzakura ===
- Spirit: Voiced by: Daisuke Hirakawa (Japanese); Vic Mignogna (English)

Byakuya's zanpakutō is Senbonzakura (千本桜; literally "Thousand cherry blossoms"). Its Shikai is triggered by the command "scatter" (散れ, chire). In the English manga the phrase is translated incorrectly at the start of volume fourteen. It is translated as "die" (死ね shine), though later in the same volume "scatter" (the actual translation for chire) is used instead. When manifested in the anime Zanpakutō Unknown Tales arc, Senbonzakura resembles a masked man in samurai armor with a half-cherry blossom decoration on his helmet.

In its Shikai, Senbonzakura's blade separates into thousands of slender, petal-like blades. The release may be negated before it is complete, such as when Yoruichi Shihōin wrapped the blade in cloth during Byakuya's short battle with Ichigo. While the blades are too small to be seen by the naked eye, they reflect light in such a way as to appear as cherry blossom petals. He can control the blades at will, thereby allowing him to shred opponents at a distance and break through almost any defense. While Byakuya can control the blades with his mind alone, using his hands allows him to do so more effectively, making the blades move twice as fast.

The inside view (the upper image) and the outside view (the lower image) of Senbonzakura's Bankai, Senkei form

Byakuya's Bankai, named Senbonzakura Kageyoshi (千本桜景厳; literally "Vibrant Scape of a Thousand Cherry Blossoms"), is essentially a much larger version of Senbonzakura's Shikai. To activate it, Byakuya drops his sword. The sword passes through the ground and two rows of giant blades rise up from the ground. These then scatter into millions of tiny blades. The number of blades is great enough that Byakuya can use them for defense and offense at the same time. He commonly forms them into large masses of blades to crush opponents. As with his Shikai, its attack is triggered with the phrase "scatter".

His Bankai has several forms, achieved by arranging the blades in different patterns. They are activated by saying the name of the technique followed by the name of his Bankai. Each form presents a different advantage, such as increasing offense at the expense of defense.

To overwhelm the defense of an opponent, Byakuya can use lit."Pivotal Scape" (吭景, gōkei). This aligns every blade in a spherical formation around his opponent, which then collapses into them from every possible angle, leaving no blind spots and no chance to escape.

His attack form is "Annihilation Scape" (殲景, Senkei), which unites the scattered petals into complete swords that form rows of swords around Byakuya and his opponent. In this form, Byakuya abandons the defense potential of his many blades and concentrates on killing the enemy. While Byakuya can control these swords as he does his regular blades, he usually attacks with just one in hand. He remarks in his battle with Ichigo that he normally only shows Senkei to those he has sworn to "kill by his own hand", Ichigo being the second to see this. After immobilizing an opponent, he can call in the other blades to hit them while they are trapped. He can also use all the blades at once for one immensely powerful strike. He demonstrates that Senkei can also be used as a barrier to protect those inside from a barrage of Cero blasts. He also displays the ability to activate Kageyoshi from inside Senkei, shattering all rows of swords at once.

He also possesses a secret move known as "Annihilation Scape" (一咬千刃花, Ikka Senjinka) which sends all the blades of Senkei towards his enemy at once.

As a final attack he can use "Final Scape" (終景, Shūkei). This condenses every one of his blades into a single sword, drastically increasing its cutting power. The blade appears bright white, and its aura takes the form of a dragon, earning it the name lit."Sword of the White Emperor" (白帝剣, Hakuteiken). Byakuya also grows pure white wings and a halo-like circle in the back, both made of spiritual power.

== Reception ==
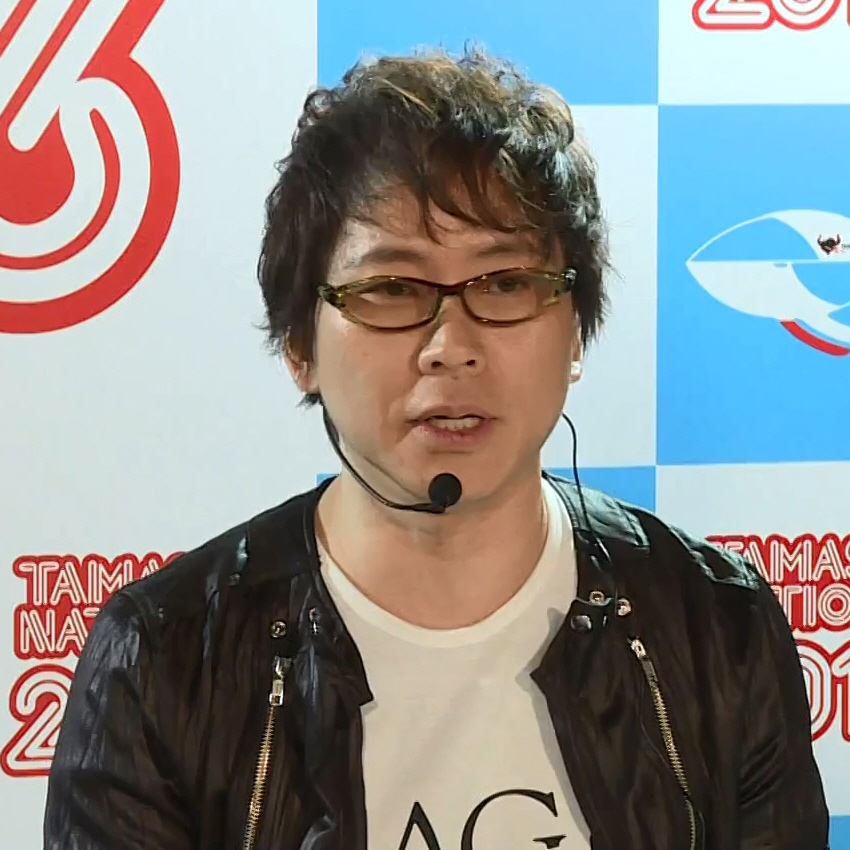
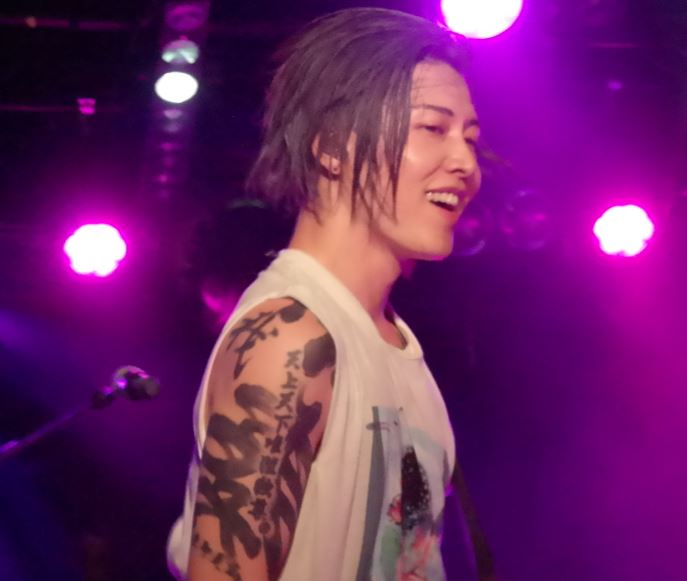
Ryōtarō Okiayu (left) voiced Byakuya in the Japanese version of the anime and Miyavi (right) portrays the character in the live-action film.

He was ranked 7th in the most recent popularity poll with 4,010 votes, edging out Orihime Inoue by 35 votes. In 2007, he was one of 4 Bleach characters to place in Newtype's top 100 anime character listing. Dan Woren, Byakuya's English voice actor, liked how his character is able to deal with anything while staying cool. He also noted his need to stick to the rules but found it tragic due to the fact he becomes determined to execute Rukia Kuchiki, his sister.

IGN praises his character's faults and contrasts with Ichigo shown during their climactic battle, stating that "his problem...is that he's arrogant." The battle was "made better by the fact that these two characters have such different personalities, and they really seem to be bringing the best out of each other." His lack of truly villainous characteristics as an antagonistic role was also praised; in the same review, IGN notes that Ichigo and Byakuya are both "just two people fighting for what they think is right. Ichigo for friendship, and Byakuya for honor and Soul Society pride. Instead of the usual evil vs. good battle, it becomes more about whether honor and rules should come first before saving a friend." At the end of the Soul Society arc, moments showing Byakuya's changes in character were heralded as being some of "the best in the episode"; IGN writes "while Byakuya has changed, he still enjoys some of the traditions of the Soul Society."
