= Chousei Kantai Sazer-X the Movie: Fight! Star Warriors =

Japanese name
- Kanji: 劇場版 超星艦隊セイザーX 戦え!星の戦士たち
Transcriptions
- Revised Hepburn: Gekijōban Chōsei Kantai Sazer X: Tatakae! Hoshi no Senshitachi)
- Directed by: Kazuki Ōmori
- Written by: Toshiyuki Tabe
- Starring: Oribito Kasahara; Hiromi Eguchi; Ryosuke Takahashi; Mami Matsuyama; Gaku Shindo; Ryosuke Miura; Tatsuya Isaka; Shiori Kanzaki; Isaka Shunya
- Production company: Toho Company Ltd.
- Distributed by: TV Tokyo
- Release date: December 17, 2005
- Running time: 70 minutes
- Country: Japan
- Language: Japanese

Chousei Kantai Sazer-X the Movie: Fight! Star Warriors (劇場版 超星艦隊セイザーX 戦え!星の戦士たち, Gekijōban Chōsei Kantai Sazer X: Tatakae! Hoshi no Senshitachi; English: Super Star Fleet Sazer-X the Movie: Fight! Star Warriors), also known as Sazer-X the Movie in English, is a 2005 tokusatsu superhero film by Toho Company Ltd. The film is based on all the warriors of the Chouseishin Series. It is directed by Kazuki Omori, known abroad for his contributions to the Godzilla series. Sazer-X the Movie was released on December 17, 2005, with a duration of 70 minutes. The DVD was released on May 26, 2006.

== Plot ==
The film starts with the Sazer-X playing basketball. Suddenly, a flash of lightning strikes Earth. They head towards it and discover a boy named Riki, who is the main character of the film. He was sent by the space pirates, but pretends to forget everything.

Remy informs the Sazer-X that a giant monster, 'Mecha Giant Beast Bulgario', had approached Earth and was destroying buildings. The Sazer-X defeats the monster anyway. Something flashes into their eyes, Takuto had mistaken it for a Cosmo Capsule. It was, in fact, a Bosquito that existed inside Bulgario, which was later explained by Professor Horiguchi.

The Bosquito absorb the JustiPowers on Sazer Island, reproduce and disguise themselves into Justirisers. Riki is sent by the Space Pirates to steal the Cosmo Capsules. Riki is convinced that the Earthlings were the Bosquito and were responsible for the elimination of their planet. Vengeance arises in his mind, so he accepts the proposal made by the Space Pirates.

Later, he realizes that humanity was not the Bosquito and the space pirates were the ones who deceived him in the hope of getting the Cosmo Capsules.

The Bosquito start killing thousands of people by absorbing them. The attires were the only thing left of the people and were all fallen on the ground. The real Justirisers could not believe this scenario. They try to transform, but it was in vain. National Defense make a space battleship – called 'Interception Battleship Gouten' – to invade the Bosquito. They also send 'Type-05 GS Assist Robot Yuuhi', but it was later destroyed. The Justirisers go to Sazer Island and find Mio Tendou lying senseless. All of them help get back the JustiPowers. Riki breaks G2 and the Sazer-X are incapable of transforming. Takuto is taken by the space pirates and is sent to the Phantom Ship, where he saves people from other planets (who were destroyed by the Bosquito), including Riki's mother and father.

Takuto's grandfather (Sojirou Ando) repairs G2, but Riki steals it. Riki then realizes the deception of the space pirates and so resolved not to handover the Cosmo Capsules to them. Rather, he keeps G2 with him and lets the Sazer-X transform again. Professor Horiguchi kept a Crystal Slab, which would react to the only one whose heart is full of love, courage and justice. Luckily that person is Riki, who helps the Gransazers to get back their powers. The Justirisers and Gransazers fight against thousands of Bosquito, and the Sazer-X come to help. They combine their powers and destroy many of the Bosquito. But quickly, the Phantom Ship crashes on Earth and absorbs all the powers of the other Bosquito on Earth and forms the Mammoth-Bosquito dragon, which is enormous in size.

With the assistance of Ryuuseishin Shark-Leaguer, The Mammoth-Bosquito was destroyed by Great-Lio using the final move, Howling Crush, in which the power of the Gransazers, Justirisers and Sazer-X combined into the finishing attack that destroyed the monster.

== Cast ==
- Oribito Kasahara as Riki
- Hiromi Eguchi as Mio Tendo
- Ryosuke Takahashi as Takuto Ando/Lio Sazer
- Mami Matsuyama as Remi Freedle
- Gaku Shindo as Ad/Eagle Sazer
- Ryosuke Miura as Kane/Beetle Sazer
- Tatsuya Isaka as Shouta Date/Riser Glen
- Shiori Kanzaki as Yuka Sanada/Riser Kageri
- Isaka Junya as Shinya Hiraga/Riser Gant
- Hiroshi Matsunaga as Commander Shark/Shark Sazer
- Katsumi Munakata as Sojirou Ando
- Shoichiro Akaboshi as Professor Ichiro Horiguchi
- Toru Minegishi as Jinguji
- Robert Baldwin as Gordo
- Makoto Yasumura as Ein (voice)
- Hiromi Ohtsuda as Zwein (voice)
- Yukari Tachibana as Riki's mother
- Futamura Ya Kou as Riki's father
- President Takada (cameo appearance) as President Takada
- Anne Joe admiral (cameo appearance) as Anne Joe admiral
- Yuji Shimada (cameo appearance) as Yuji Shimada

== Characters ==
Sazer X Character
- Lio-Sazer
- Eagle-Sazer
- Beetle-Sazer
- Twinsazer-Ein
- Twinsazer-Zwein

Gransazer Character

- Sazer-Tarious
- Sazer-Mithras
- Sazer-Remls
- Sazer-Velsou
- Sazer-Dail
- Sazer-Lion
- Sazer-Visuel
- Sazer-Tawlon
- Sazer-Tragos
- Sazer-Gorbion
- Sazer-Gans
- Sazer-Pisces

Justiriser Character

- Riser Glen
- Riser Kageri
- Riser Gant

Other Character include:Enemies or Allies from another series.

- New Bosquito
- Gig-Fighter
- Shark-Sazer
- Vizur (stock footage)
- Ruby (stock footage)
- Garba Alien (stock footage)

== Mecha, monster and other appearances ==
- Core-Braver or Core-Calibur
- Ryuuseishin Great-Lio
- Ryuuseishin Wind-Eagle
- Ryuuseishin Magna-Beet
- Ryuuseishin Shark-Leaguer
- Fusion Beast-King DaiSazer
- Genseishin Ken-Riser
- Genseishin Nin-Riser
- Genseishin Juu-Riser
- Seishinjuu Ryuto
- Interception Battleship Gouten (Gotengo)
- Type-05 GS Assist Robot Yuuhi
- Mammoth-Bosquito
- Phantom Ship
- Battleship Balgareon
- Mecha Giant Beast Bulgario
- Bosquito Egg

== Soundtrack ==
The soundtrack for the 2005 feature film that combines characters from the three Star God shows into a single storyline. One's reaction to the soundtrack itself will differ greatly, as most of the music is just extended themes from the Super Fleet Sazer-X show as opposed to a completely original score. Hiroshi Takagi did compose some unique music for the movie, but it is few and far between here. For all intents and purposes, the music also sounds like the same very limited size orchestra from the show was also used, as the music does not sound any more "grand" as one would have hoped for a feature film. Regardless, there are a couple of nice cues off this release, in particular "The Terrible Beast Appears!" which conveys an almost serial-like mentality to the monster appearing, befitting the show it comes from, along with "Large Pinch!" which is probably the most interesting cue from the show and that not too surprisingly goes for the movie as well.

The disc also features some recycled themes from previous Toho endeavors, such as the "Life Goes On" song from The Gransazers (2003) and the title song for The Justirisers (2004), both of which are present in their shorter versions instead of the extended tracks. Among the reoccurring music is Akira Ifukube's "Gotengo Theme," which is the one that plays when the ship flies off to face the Mu submarine in the original film Atragon (1963).

Track	Soundtrack
1	Opening
2	3 Generals Theme
3	Go Go Takuto!
4	X! Equip!!
5	The Terrible Beast Appears!
6	Great-Lio
7	Wind-Eagle
8	Magna-Beet
9	The Darkness That Lies Hidden in the Seabed
10	To Look at the Night Sky
11	Bosquito Revival
12	Secret
13	Defeat the Death Power!
14	Super Star Fleet: Sazer-X; By: Hiroki Takahashi
15	Dejection
16	The Shining Star
17	The Undersea Battleship Attacks; Composer: Akira Ifukube
18	The Beginning of the Giant Battle!
19	Approaching the Coming Enemy
20	Thoughts from Within
21	Confusion
22	Suspense of Time
23	Malicious Revival
24	Youhi Appears
25	Phantom Star God: Justirisers; By: Mitsuo Nakajima, Composer: Kenji Kojima
26	Pinch!
27	Scramble for Takeoff
28	Life Goes On (Short Version); By: U-Ya Asaoka, Composer: Eddy Blues
29	The Strongest Enemy
30	Large Pinch!
31	Super Star Fleet: Sazer-X Main Theme
32	Through Peace in the Stars
33	New Horizon: Fight! Star Soldier; By: King Kong Kajiwara, Composer: HAL
