= Hiroko Suzuki =

Japanese professional wrestler, valet and promoter (born 1974)

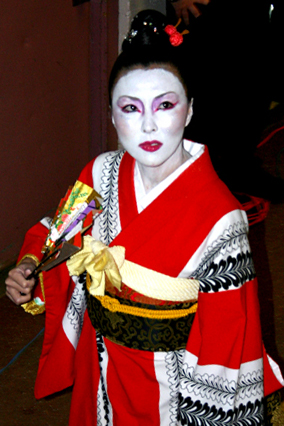

Personal information
- Born: Hiroko Mizuno; 1974 (age 51–52) Aichi, Japan
- Spouse: Kenzo Suzuki (m. 2003)
- Website: suzuki-hiroko.jp

Professional wrestling career
- Ring name: Hiroko
- Billed height: 5 ft 2 in (1.57 m)
- Billed weight: 110 lb (50 kg)
- Billed from: "The Land of the Rising Sun"
- Debut: 2004
- Retired: 2006

Hiroko Suzuki (鈴木 浩子, Suzuki Hiroko), née Mizuno (水野, Mizuno), (born February 14, 1975) is a Japanese politician, professional wrestling valet, occasional professional wrestler and professional wrestling promoter best known in the United States for her work with World Wrestling Entertainment on its SmackDown! brand under the ring name Hiroko. She graduated from Meiji University, and became an announcer of Fukushima Central Television. She is married to professional wrestler Kenzo Suzuki. Since 2015, she has served as a member of the Funabashi city council.

== Professional wrestling career ==
=== World Wrestling Entertainment (2004–2005) ===
On June 10, 2004, Hiroko made her debut as the geisha valet and translator for her real-life husband Kenzo Suzuki on World Wrestling Entertainment (WWE)'s SmackDown! brand. Her trademark phrase was "You cheer Kenzo Suzuki on to the victory!"

In November 2004, Hiroko began feuding with Torrie Wilson and numerous catfights took place between the two female wrestlers and Hiroko even wanted to fight her in a bra and panties match. The bra and panties match Hiroko wanted was later changed to a kimono match. In December 2004, backstage during a photo shooting, Torrie Wilson was given a bouquet of flowers from Kenzo. This angered Hiroko and stripped Torrie to her underwear, this made Torrie chase, and eventually caught up to, Hiroko and strip her to her underwear as well. On an episode of SmackDown! held in Japan airing February 10, 2005, The kimono match was then held. Hiroko lost and got stripped to her bra and panties during the match. Hiroko and Kenzo were traded to the RAW brand on June 30, 2005 at the end of the 2005 Draft Lottery. However, they were both released by the WWE on July 6, 2005 without ever appearing on RAW. The move was seen as cost-cutting since several other wrestlers were released at the same time, as well as over the course of several weeks.

=== Hustle (2005–2006) ===
Hiroko and her husband returned to Japan, where they competed for the off-beat Hustle promotion. In a match on December 25, 2005, both Hiroko & Kenzo were defeated by the team of Liosazer & Riser Glen (of Toho's Choseishin Series).

In late 2005, Hiroko Suzuki became the General Manager for HUSTLE. On March 5, 2006, during a match between Kenzo Suzuki and Toshiaki Kawada, Hiroko turned on Kenzo and slapped him in the face, causing him to lose the match, and turning face in the process.

=== Independent circuit (2024) ===
Hiroko made her first wrestling appearance since 2006, as a participant in the 2024 Southern Honor Wrestling (SHW) Rumblejack event in Canton, Georgia. She participated in the Rumblejack Match, where it was eventually won by Carlie Bravo.

== Political career ==
In 2015, Suzuki was elected to the Funabashi city council.

== Personal life ==
Suzuki is married to Kenzo Suzuki, whom she accompanied as his valet during his time with the WWE.
