= Mami Matsuyama =

Japanese idol, singer, and actress (born 1988)

- Born: December 19, 1988 (age 37); Aomori Prefecture, Japan
- Occupations: Actress; singer; model

Mami Matsuyama (松山 まみ, Matsuyama Mami; born December 19, 1988) is a Japanese idol, singer, and actress. She has released a number of DVDs. She is best known for her role as Remi Freedle in Chousei Kantai Sazer-X.

Matsuyama cosplayed as Mao Ran, a character in a video game titled Fighting Beauty Wulong.

In 2006, she portrayed Shiori in Gal Circle. In 2007, Matsuyama released her debut single entitled "Matataku Mami: Mitsumete Hoshii". She also starred in the television drama Body Conscious Cop in that year.

== Filmography ==
=== Television ===
- Chousei Kantai Sazer-X (2005–2006), Remi Freedle
- Gal Circle (2006), Shiori
- Body Conscious Cop (2007)

=== Films ===
- Chousei Kantai Sazer-X the Movie: Fight! Star Warriors (2005), Remi Freedle
- Kurosagi (2008)

== Discography ==
=== Singles ===
- "Matataku Mami: Mitsumete Hoshii" (2007)
