= Ryo Segawa =

Japanese actor

- 瀬川亮
- Born: October 19, 1978 (age 47); Kanagawa, Japan
- Occupation: Actor
- Years active: 2003–present
- Spouse: Saki Matsuda
- Website: thirdstage.com/segawa/

Ryo Segawa (瀬川 亮, Segawa Ryō; born October 19, 1978) is a Japanese actor.

== Filmography ==
=== Television ===
- ChouSeiShin GranSazer (TV Tokyo, 2003)
- Fight (NHK, 2005)
- Walkers (NHK, 2006)
- 3 Nen B Gumi Kinpachi Sensei 8 (TBS, 2007)
- Hitogata Nagashi (NHK, 2007)
- Fuurin Kazan (NHK, 2007)
- Natsu no Himitsu (Fuji TV, 2009)
- NEXT Koisuru Anri Suiri Naka (KTV, 2009)
- Deka Wanko (NTV, 2011, ep5)
- Segodon (NHK, 2018), Gotō Shōjirō

=== Film ===
- Sekai ha Tokidoki Utsukushii (2007)
