= Robert Baldwin (Canadian-Japanese actor) =

Canadian-Japanese actor (1965–2024)

Robert Baldwin (September 27, 1965 – December 26, 2024) was a Canadian-Japanese actor.

Baldwin appeared in many Japanese films, television series, advertisements, and music videos, and also worked in Japan as a translator, narrator, and copywriter.

== Life and career ==
Baldwin was born in Eba, Naka-ku, Hiroshima, Hiroshima Prefecture on September 27, 1965.

In 2005, he appeared in Chousei Kantai Sazer-X in the recurring role of Gordo, assistant to one of the heroes; in an interview with Tokusatsu Newtype, Baldwin stated that he was likely to appear in the fourth entry of the Chouseishin Series, unaware that it would not be continued following Sazer-X.

In 2013, Baldwin appeared in Zyuden Sentai Kyoryuger as Ramirez, a former member of the heroes from ancient times. He said he was interested in playing the same role in the Power Rangers counterpart. However, the New Zealand-shot series did not cast him.

Baldwin died from colon cancer on December 26, 2024, at the age of 59. His death was announced by his daughter via X on January 4, 2025.

== Filmography ==
- Sanma no Super Karakuri TV (1996)
- Shenmue II (2001)
- Sono toki rekishi ga ugoita (2001)
- Project X: Chôsensha tachi (2001)
- Miracle Experiences! Unbelievable (2001-2005)
- Eigo de shabera-night (2001-2003)
- Godzilla Against Mechagodzilla (2002)
- Muscle Heat (2002)
- Shiritsu tantei Hama Maiku (2002)
- Bakuryuu Sentai Abaranger Deluxe: Abare Summer Is Freezing Cold (2003)
- Spy Sorge (2003)
- Love Collage (2003)
- Mâbô dôfu no nyôbô (2003)
- Good Luck!! (2003)
- Godzilla: Final Wars (2004)
- Êsu o nerae! Kiseki e no chôsen (2004)
- Hakkutsu! Aruaru daijiten (2004)
- The World’s Astonishing News! (2003-2005)
- Boys Over Flowers (2005)
- Siberian Express 5 (2005)
- The Last Love Song on This Little Planet (2005)
- A Hardest Night!! (2005)
- Chôsei kantai seizâ X (2005)
- Purimadamu (2006)
- 428: Shibuya Scramble (2008)
- Antatchaburu no makimaki de yatte miyô!! (2008)
- Ohta Hikari no watashi ga souri daijin ni nattara… hisho tanaka (2008)
- The Waste Land (2009)
- Gaiji keisatsu (2009)
- Quiz Presen Variety: Q sama!! (2009)
- Experimental Detective Totori (2013)
- SPEC: Zero (2013)
- Forma (2013)
- Zyuden Sentai Kyoryuger: It’s Here! Armed on Midsummer Festival!! (2013)
- Onna to otoko no nettai (2013)
- Zyuden Sentai Kyoryuger (2013-2014)
- Thermae Romae II (2014)
- Doamayger-D (2015)
- Ansatsu Kyoushitsu 2nd Season (2016)
