= Guren Onna =

- Genre: Drama
- Based on: Kosupure Yūrei Guren Onna by Nobuyuki Jōkō
- Written by: Erika Tanaka
- Directed by: Yūichi Abe; Kento Kinouchi
- Starring: Ai Takabe; Gaku Shindo; Yuko Takayama; Nana Natsume
- Ending theme: "Kokoro ni Colorful" by Seira Kagami
- Country of origin: Japan
- Original language: Japanese
- No. of series: 1
- No. of episodes: 12

Production
- Producers: Shinji Okabe; Shō Morita

Original release
- Network: TV Tokyo
- Release: January 11 – March 28, 2008

Kosupure Yūrei Guren Onna (コスプレ幽霊 紅蓮女") is a 12-episode Japanese TV series released in 2008 starring Ai Takabe.

== Plot ==
A teacher, who is not happy with her job, pretends to be the ghost of a murder victim. Little did she know that she would meet the real ghost, the actual murderer and a heroine. She finds a man who chases her.

== Casts ==
Main

- Ai Takabe as Fumiyo Nabekura
- Gaku Shindo as Kogorō Kenzuka
- Yuko Takayama as Miyuki Nakagawa
- Nana Natsume as Rumi Ozaki

Guest

- Ryo Fukawa (Episode 1)
- Minami Minegishi (Episode 5)
- Hanawa (Episode 6)

Preceded by The Embalmer (5 October 2007 - 21 December 2007)	TV Tokyo Drama 24; Fridays 24:12 - 24:52 (JST)	Succeeded by Hisho no Kagami (11 April 2008 - 27 June 2008)
