= Muscle Heat =

- U.S. DVD cover
- Directed by: Ten Shimoyama
- Screenplay by: Kongoh; Tetsuya Oishi
- Story by: Ushio Higushi
- Produced by: Morihiro Kodama; Norihiko Tani; Kazuya Hamana; Toshiaki Nakazawa
- Starring: Kane Kosugi; Show Aikawa; Masaya Kato; Naoto Takenaka; Ikkei Watanabe
- Cinematography: Hideo Yamamoto
- Music by: Kōji Endō
- Production companies: Dentsu Productions, Ltd; Imagica Corp. Nihon Shuppan Hanbai; Sedic International; Tokyo Broadcasting System
- Distributed by: Toho
- Release date: October 26, 2002 (Japan)
- Running time: 92 minutes
- Country: Japan
- Languages: Japanese; Cantonese; English

Muscle Heat (Japanese: マッスルヒート, Hepburn: Massuruhīto) (Note: Released in North America as Blood Heat.) is a 2002 Japanese action film directed by Ten Shimoyama. The film stars Kane Kosugi, Show Aikawa, Masaya Kato, and Naoto Takenaka. In the film, an ex-Navy SEAL attempts to bring down a criminal organization that is benefitting from a dangerous drug called "Blood Heat." Muscle Heat was theatrically released in Japan on October 26, 2002.

== Plot ==
In the year 2009, CPO Joe Jinno (Kane Kosugi), a former U.S. Navy SEAL is sitting in a military jail cell in Roanoke, Virginia. Japanese detective Aguri Katsuragi (Show Aikawa) has gotten amnesty for Jinno, whose refusal to kill terrorists because the enemies he found were scared children had him court martialed. Two months later, Jinno was tasked by U.S. Secretary of Defense to join an undercover mission with Katsuragi to stop the circulation of Blood Heat, a new drug on the market that acts as a super steroid. The man in charge of the drug's circulation, Lai Kenjin (Masaya Kato), has set up the Muscle Dome, an underground fight ring where his champion, Lee Son-Min (Ken Lo), uses Blood Heat and goes through his opponents with ease.

At a local nightclub, a deal is about to be made between Kenjin and Russian drug dealers (Robert Baldwin). However, Joe and Aguri are able to stop the deal from happening. They are unable to stop Kenjin as he escapes and Aguri ends up kidnapped. That night, Joe looks at a big screen TV and finds Aguri in the Muscle Dome, where he is viciously beaten by Lee and is crucified. Lai gets a visit from his Chinese half-brother Lai Kenkyo, whom he hopes can make a merger to distribute Blood Heat. The next day, Joe finds Kenjin's place and begins to make his way through Kenjin's men. When Kenkyo refuses to help his brother, Kenjin murders his brother by impaling a chopstick through his mouth. Joe fights hard against Kenjin's men in the hallway leading to Kenjin's apartment. However, Kenjin escapes by helicopter and Joe is busted by female cop Ayane Katsuragi, Aguri's sister. While in custody, Joe makes his escape and even knocks out Ayane in the process.

The next day, Ayane finds Joe again but this time she is not alone. With the cops hot on his trail, Joe jumps off a bridge and lands on a cargo ship. Ayane is warned by her superior, Asakura, that Joe is a "walking weapon" and that he may be involved with the circulation of Blood Heat. Meanwhile, Joe rescues a young girl named Haruka, whose father turns out to be the creator of Blood Heat and was forced to continue making it by Kenjin. As Haruka and Joe make their way to escape, they find a reluctant group of youngsters underground. The youngsters are revealed to be orphans whose parents were victims of Kenjin, whether it was Blood Heat or losing major bets at the Muscle Dome. The leader of the "rats" is the mysterious Ken (Noboru Kaneko), who refuses to help Joe and Ayane, who learns of everything that has transpired and decides to help. However, when Joe is caught by Kenjin and refuses an offer to work for him, Joe finds himself in the Muscle Dome against Lee.

To give him motivation, the video of Aguri's death is played at the Muscle Dome. In a fit of rage, Joe begins to unleash his skills on Lee, eventually knocking him down. Lee takes Blood Heat and seems to get the upper hand. However, the fight is interrupted by Ken, who decided not only to help but had planted bombs within the confines of the Muscle Dome. Ken appears on the big screen in the dome and tells Kenjin of all he had done and makes various areas explode. However, despite the chaos, Lee continues to fight Joe until Joe finally is able to kill Lee. Ayane learns Asakura was also in cahoots with Kenjin and a scuffle resorts to Ayane gunning down Asakura. Meanwhile, Joe follows Kenjin to an abandoned parking garage, where Lee reveals he wanted Joe because he knows that anger is the driving force to kill someone. Joe and Lee, who has taken Blood Heat, begin to fight using sledge hammers but soon find themselves fighting bare-handed. The two stand off and lunge kick at each other, where just before the hit is made, we get a narration from Joe.

A dark figure walks out of the garage and it is revealed to be Joe as Kenjin is seen dead on the ground. Joe meets with the "rats" and Ayane as they celebrate the end of Blood Heat. When Ken asks Joe who he is, Joe, who had not smiled throughout the film, finally releases a smirk before the credits roll.

== Cast ==
- Kane Kosugi as Joe Jinno
- Show Aikawa as Aguri Katsuragi
- Masaya Kato as Lai Kenjin
- Misato Tachibana as Ayane Katsuragi
- Joe Lee as Lai Kenkyo
- Noboru Kaneko as Ken, leader of the "rats"
- Ken Lo as Lee Son-Min, the Muscle Dome Champion
- Ikkei Watanabe as Detective Asakura
- Shinya Hashimoto as Muscle Dome Wrestler
- Yoshihiro Takayama as Muscle Dome Wrestler
- Naoto Takenaka as Tajima, the Street Better
- Chan Man-Ching as Muscle Dome Fighter
- Robert Baldwin as Russian Drug Dealer

== Production ==
The story for the film was created by Ushio Higuchi, the creator of the popular show Sasuke, known to American audiences as Ninja Warrior. Higuchi had come up with the story with Kane Kosugi, who at the time was not only an actor, but a competitor in a few of the Sasuke competitions. Music video director Ten Shimoyama made his feature film directorial debut with this film. In an age where CGI would replace action, action director Sam Wong revealed at the press conference that he wanted to bring a new style of action for Kane Kosugi, who had become influenced with Hong Kong's style of action. The film would be shot mostly in English and Japanese, but have a few scenes in Cantonese with the appearances of Jackie Chan Stunt Team member Ken Lo and the late Hong Kong actor Joe Lee, who plays Kenjin's half-brother.

== Stunts ==
The action scenes were choreographed by two men from Jackie Chan's stunt team, Chan Man Ching (Rumble in the Bronx, Rush Hour), and Sam Wong (Thunderbolt, Supercop). Chan, who befriended Kane due to Kane's friendship with Jackie's godson Sammy Hung (the son of film legend Sammo Hung), loaned Chan and Wong out for the film along with fellow stunt team member Antonio Carpio, who served as assistant action director. A translator was assigned to both men. Kane Kosugi performed all of his own stunts.

== Reception/U.S. release ==
Despite not being released in North American theaters, the film received reviews from American critics. High Impact Reviews awarded the film a solid 4 stars out of 4, calling it a "MUST-SEE Japanese action-er!" Netflix.com called it an "Intense pulse pounding action film". Upon the film's release in the United States, it was re-titled Blood Heat, named after the drug constantly referenced in the movie. Some international DVDs also renamed the film Blood Heat upon release while others kept the film's original title.

== Soundtrack ==
The film was composed by Kōji Endō. The R&B band Full Of Harmony (F.O.H.) contributed their song Casino Drive to the film's ending credits.
