= Ai Takabe =

Japanese actress (born 1988

- 高部 あい
- Born: 中山 あい (Ai Nakayama); August 16, 1988 (age 38); Hachiōji, Tokyo, Japan
- Occupations: Actress; voice actress
- Years active: 2004–2015

Ai Takabe (高部 あい, Takabe Ai; born August 16, 1988) is a Japanese former actress and voice actress. She is best known for starring as Fumiyo Nabekura in television series Guren Onna and voicing Agiri Goshiki in anime television series Kill Me Baby.

== Career ==
Ai Takabe won the Gravure Award at the 10th Japan Bishōjo Contest in August 2004. The following month, she joined Bishōjo Club 31 (美少女クラブ31), an idol group composed of Japan Bishōjo Contest winners (8th through 10th). In May 2005, she won the Grand Prix award at the 1st Miss WPB Contest.

Takabe's first acting role was in the 2006 P&G Pantene Drama Special: True Love. She played a lacrosse player and acted alongside Yui Aragaki. She also played various minor roles in Gachi Baka, Teru Teru Ashita, Shimokita Sundays, and Kosodate no Tensai.

In October 2007, she played a supporting character in the television series Flight Panic. In 2008, Takabe played the leading role in Guren Onna, as a high school teacher who dresses up as the ghost of a murder victim.

Takabe was also affiliated with Oscar Promotion, until 2015.

== Personal life ==
Takabe graduated from Horikoshi High School in 2007. In 2017, Takabe married a well-respected attorney.

=== Arrest ===
On October 15, 2015, Ai Takabe was arrested for alleged cocaine possession, effectively ending her acting career.

On March 30, 2016, the Tokyo District Public Prosecutors Office (PPO) dropped the charges against her. The PPO reported that the exoneration was not "due to a lack of evidence or condolence," but to a "comprehensive consideration of the very small amount of narcotics in her possession, as well as the social sanctions she has already received."

== Filmography ==
Bold denotes leading roles.

=== Film ===
- Yoru no Picnic (2006) – Ryōko Uchibori
- Waruboro (2007) – Sayuki
- Gu-Gu Datte Neko de Aru (2008) – Kyoko
- Looking for Anne (2009)
- Liar Game: The Final Stage (2010)
- Joshikōsei Zombie (2010) – **Airin**
- Sue, Mai & Sawa: Righting the Girl Ship (2012) – Chigusa Maeda

=== Television ===
- True Love (2006) – Kana Suzuki
- Gachi Baka (2006) – Yūko Kageyama
- Teru Teru Ashita (2006) – Yoshiko Yamada
- Shimokita Sundays (2006) – Futaba Tadokoro
- Kosodate no Tensai (2007) – Miyū Kamiya
- Guren Onna (2008) – **Fumiyo Nabekura**
- Cat Street (2008) – Nako Sonoda
- Fukuoka Renai Hakusho Part 4 (2009) – **Maya Ebihara**
- Reset (2009) – Sachiko Akigusa
- Mirai wa Bokura no Te no Naka ni (2009) – Mika Higuchi
- Arienai! (2010) – Miwa Yamamoto
- The Legend of Yang Guifei (2010) – Yuriko Watanabe
- Freeter, Ie wo Kau (2010) – Michiru Toyonaka
- Ihin no Koe o Kiku Otoko 3 (2012) – Karin Sawaguchi
- Shirato Osamu no Jikenbo (2012) – Yumi Yanagisawa
- Yo Nimo Kimyō na Monogatari: Dressing Room (2012) – Maiko Kawai
- Renai Kentei (2012) – Kako Sekine
- Michinoku Mengui Kisha Miyazawa Kenichirō 2 (2013) – Umi Aoyama
- Tada's Do-It-All House (2013) – Saya Takeuchi
- Neo Ultra Q (2013) – Secretary
- Keishichō Minamidaira Han (2013) – Kyōko Shinjō
- Kakushōa (2013) – Sayaka Hiyama
- Depāto Shikake Hito! (2013) – Rina Hayama
- Sai Sōsa Keiji Yūsuke Kataoka (2014) – Minako Kurayoshi
- Black President (2014) – Misaki Tōyama
- Dekachō (2014) – Sakiko Inagaki
- Zeimu Chōsakan (2014) – Yū Tagami
- Yōjū Mameshiba Bōkyō Hen (2014)
- Hōigaku Kyōshitsu no Jiken File no Tōjō Jinbutsu (2014) – Chihiro Shimanuki
- Nishimura Kyōtarō Travel Mystery no Tōjō Jinbutsu (2015) – Miyuki Tsubaki
- Kyōto Ninjō Sōsa File (2015) – Kayo Hoshino
- Mito Kōmon Special (2015) – Okoi
- Konkatsu Keiji (2015) – Saori Shinohara

=== Anime ===
- Aoi Hana (2009) – **Fumi Manjoume**
- Hourou Musuko (2011) – Maiko
- Sacred Seven (2011)
- Kill Me Baby (2012) – **Agiri Goshiki**
- Kill Me Baby OVA (2013) – **Agiri Goshiki**
