= Chousei Kantai Sazer-X =

2005 Japanese TV series

- Genre: Tokusatsu; Superhero fiction Action/Adventure; Kaiju
- Created by: Toho
- Written by: Tamio Hayashi
- Directed by: Okihiro Yoneda
- Starring: Ryosuke Takahashi; Gaku Shindo; Ryosuke Miura; Hiroshi Matsunaga; Mami Matuyama; Yuu Asakura; Chinami Ishizaka
- Composer: Hiroshi Takagi
- Country of origin: Japan
- No. of episodes: 38

Production
- Running time: 25 minutes (per episode)

Original release
- Network: TV Tokyo
- Release: October 1, 2005 – June 24, 2006

Related
- Genseishin Justirisers

Chousei Kantai Sazer-X (超星艦隊セイザーX, Chōsei Kantai Seizā Ekkusu) translated as Super Star Fleet Sazer-X is a tokusatsu superhero TV series produced by Toho Company Ltd., and Konami. This series is the third in Toho's Seishin (Star God) series. The series lasted 38 episodes and was the last of the Chouseishin franchise. It deviates from its predecessors in several ways, in that it is more comedic in nature and is much more science fiction-orientated in contrast to fantasy.

== Synopsis ==
In the year 2500, Earth has been taken over and covered in darkness by a race known as the Neo-Descal. The remaining members of the human resistance send their trump card weapons, the three Meteor God warships to the past to try to change the future by stopping Neo-Descal in 2005, when their attacks began. Along with the Meteor God warships comes Ad, captain of the Adle Eagle squad and his right-hand man, Gordo, Kane, captain of the Beet-Vizor squad, and the twin Sazers Ein and Zwein, and Remy, who pilots Lio Carrier. Ad and Kane are joined by Takuto Ando, whose grandfather met Captain Shark, leader of the resistance, as a young man and was left with a Knuckle Cross to allow his grandson in 2005 to become the third member of the team known as Sazer X.

Sazer X fight the space pirates known as Descal, and later Neo-Descal when they arrive from the future after the defeat of their ancestors. Captain Shark, known as the Shark Sazer, arrives later from the future, along with his rival, Jackall, a mysterious Sazer-like being who holds one of Shark's greatest secrets.

== Characters ==
=== Sazer X ===
A team assembled in the year AD 2500 with the goal of traveling back in time 500 years and changing history by collecting the twelve Cosmo Capsules. Each member of the party is equipped with a Strage-Ring around their wrist that amplifies their elemental powers, and their own personal Knuckle-Cross, worn on the back of the opposite hand. When the Strage-Ring sparks the Knuckle-Cross, they can equip the high-powered suit of armour stored in their Knuckle-Cross and become Sazer-X. Their transformation call is X-Equip.

==== Lio-Sazer ====
In episode 38 (final), he became one of 12 warriors by Cosmo Capsules to make a glorious future with Remy and his younger sister (Yui Ando).

Takuto Ando (安藤 拓人, Andō Takuto) is the main character of the series, his grandfather met Captain Shark when he was stranded in the past, making a pact with him to allow his grandson to fight alongside Shark and his allies. He dreams of becoming an F1 racer and having his grandfather accept him as a man. Reckless and immature at first, Takuto grows and develops as a person throughout the course of the series into somewhat of a leader figure. Throughout the series, Takuto grows a fondness for Remy that eventually blossoms into love. Takuto also has a rivalry with the Fire Shogun Blaird, who he has a habit of forgetting his name. Much to his chagrin, those around him often call Takuto "Tak-kun", which is colloquial slang for the phrase "You've got to be kidding me".

As Lio-Sazer (ライオセイザー, Raio Seizā), his element is Fire and his personal weapon is the Lio-Breaker sword. When the Cosmo Capsule "Lio-1" is equipped in Lio-Breaker, he can perform his finishing move, "Lio Fire", unleashing a massive fiery lion from Lio Breaker which engulfs and totally annihilates the enemy.

Lio Sazer has destroyed more enemies with Lio-Fire than any other Sazer, and Lio-Fire happens to be the strongest of all Cosmo Capsule finishers.

==== Eagle-Sazer ====
In episode 38 (final), he became one of 12 warriors by Cosmo capsules and final time to shine then return to his home planet to make a glorious future.

Ad (アド, Ado) is the serious member of the group. He acts like he is the second-in-command of the Sazer-X. Takuto thought that he is the leader. Remy told him that they only have one leader, just Captain Shark. He initially does not take well to Takuto or any of the current era's Earth populace, accusing them of neglect in allowing themselves to be conquered by the Space Pirates in the past, leading to the eventual destruction of his home planet Biyodo. However, after finding out the painful truth that his people were the ones who initially stole the Cosmo Capsules from the Pirates and instigated Earth's invasion, he began to warm up and become more friendly with Takuto and the other people of Earth.

As Eagle-Sazer (イーグルセイザー, Īguru Seizā), his element is Wind and his personal weapon is the Eagle-Blaster gun. When the Cosmo Capsule "Eagle-2" is equipped in Eagle-Blaster, he can perform his finishing move, "Eagle Typhoon".

==== Beetle-Sazer ====
In episode 38 (final), he became one of 12 warriors by Cosmo Capsules and third time with twin Sazers Ein and Zwein return to his planet to make a glorious future.

Kane Lucano (ケイン・ルカーノ, Kein Rukāno) is the easygoing, happy-go-lucky member of the group. He usually goofs off when they are not fighting, and is especially fond of sightseeing. However, he is a strong believer that even if he has a relaxed attitude most of the time, he comes through when he is needed the most, which he has often proven true through his actions. He is the oldest of seven siblings, and hails from the planet Radei.

As Beetle-Sazer (ビートルセイザー, Bītoru Seizā), his element is Lightning and his personal weapon is the Beet-Hawk axe. When the Cosmo Capsule "Beetle-3" is equipped in Beet-Hawk, he can perform his finishing move, "Beetle Slash".

==== Shark-Sazer ====
In episode 38 (final), he is a mentor about Cosmo Capsules destined warriors to his comrades and return to future with all of mecha robot and transformation's sazer device.

Commander Shark (シャーク隊長, Shāku Taishō), the commanding officer and only leader of Sazer X. He does not travel back in time with Ad, Kane and Remy straight away, choosing to support the troops in the future before heading back himself. He eventually appears once the Neo Descal fleet arrives in the present day. He is also the adoptive father of Remy. His special Knuckle Cross is named Shark-Knuckle.

It is eventually revealed that he is half Space Pirate, which means that the success of the Sazer-X mission would cause him to be erased from history, having never been born. Despite this, he is resolute to carry out the mission to completion.

As Shark-Sazer (シャークセイザー, Shāku Seizā), his element is Water and his personal weapon is the Shark-Bash sword. When the Cosmo Capsule "Shark-4" is equipped in Shark-Bash, he can perform his finishing move, "Shark Crush".

=== Sazer Support Team ===
==== Remy Freede ====
In episode 38 (final), she was chosen by Cosmo Capsules to become one of 12 warriors with Takuto Ando and Yui Ando and to make a glorious future.

Remy Freede (レミー・フリーデ, Remī Furīde) is Takuto's support technician, who usually has to show him how to use the Sazer equipment. She acts like she is the third-in-command of the Sazer-X. She co-pilots Lio-Carrier with G2. Unlike the other members of the support team, she has no Sazer form. She was adopted by Shark and raised from the planet Roue, which was destroyed by the Neo-Descal. However, it is revealed that she actually was born during the 1960s, and was brought to the future by Shark to cure her terminal disease. It is very likely she has feelings for Takuto.

==== Capsazer G2 ====
A robot that co-pilots the Lio-Carrier with Remy who is G2's "mother". G2 is designed to safely store the retrieved Cosmo Capsules as well as the personal weapons of Sazer-X, and can teleport them upon command to the team.

==== Gordo ====
In episode 38 (final), he and his wife are chosen by Cosmo Capsules to become one of 12 warriors and second time to shine and return to his home planet with his wife to make a glorious future.

Gordo (ゴルド, Gorudo) is Ad's usually quiet (and lazy, always sleep) support tech who possesses immense strength, shoulder-length ragged blond hair, and is more than capable of fighting on his own. He co-pilots Adle-Eagle. In addition, he has a device which enables him to turn into a Sazer Form called "Sazer Gordo", which has partial armor and helmet, and an arm attachment which consists of a mace and axe.

==== Twin-Sazers Ein & Zwein ====
In episode 38 (final), they are chosen by Cosmo Capsules to become two of 12 warriors and third time to shine then to return to their planet with Kane to make a glorious future.

Kane's support team; The Twin Sazers (ツインセイザー) are a brother/sister team who assist Kane in battle, and co-pilot Beet-Vizor. The Brother is Ein (アイン, Ain) and the sister is Zwein (ツバイン, Tsubain). Like Kane, they too are inexperienced. They are almost always in Sazer Form, which led to speculation that they were robots. However, their true forms are shapeless pink and blue colored blobs which can leave their suits on command. They enjoy taking baths in the Ando household, due to their ship not having a bath.

==== Patora ====
In episode 38 (final), she and her husband are chosen by Cosmo Capsules to become one of 12 warriors and second time to shine and return to her home planet with her husband to make a glorious future.

Gordo's wife and a master of infiltration, Patora (パトラ) snuck aboard King Neo-Descal's ship in order to get to the present.

=== The Three Shoguns ===
In episode 38 (final), their Cosmo Capsules first shine and guide them to their home space pirates and they are chosen by Cosmo Capsules to become three of 12 warriors to make a glorious future.

=== The Three Shoguns ===
A legendary trio of Space Pirates who gained the nickname of "The Three Shoguns". The first enemies of Sazer-X, they came to Earth under the command of Captain Barder of the Space Pirate Descal fleet with the intent of taking over the Earth, which had once been populated by their ancestors. In the original timeline, they were successful in gathering the twelve Cosmo Capsules, and their wish to take over the Earth plunged it into eternal darkness. Thus, they are the ancestors of the future Space Pirates that rule over Earth.

==== Fire Shogun Blaird ====
The leader of the Three Shoguns, Fire Shogun Blaird (火将軍ブレアード, Hi Shōgun Bureādo) is the strongest fighter of the trio, but he is the least intelligent and tends to become riled up easily. He quickly develops a one-sided rivalry with Takato/Lio-Sazer, vowing to someday "settle the score" and defeat him. After Barder is revealed to be an android, he begins to question the mission of the Three Shogun on Earth. His rivalry with Takuto becomes a grudging friendship, and he joins forces with Sazer-X with the goal of reuniting the Three Shogun and returning to space.

He temporarily joins Jackall against Sazer-X and especially Shark-Sazer. Jackall's eventual death teaches Blaird the folly of a life consumed completely by revenge and combat, and he returns to the side of Sazer-X piloting Jackall's Drill-Angler.

==== Water Shogun Aqual ====
The female of the Three Shoguns, Water Shogun Aqual (水将軍アクアル, Mizu Shōgun Akuaru) likes to believe that she is the most intelligent of the Three Shogun, and while she is quite smart she is also extremely vain and prideful. She is the one most dedicated to the Three Shogun's original mission to take over Earth, mainly because she loves power and praise. As a result, she is the one that formally breaks up the Three Shogun by discarding Blaird from the group when he begins to question their mission.

When Neo Descal appears, they begin by flattering Aqual as their honored descendant to gain her trust, but this is simply because they cannot kill her without erasing themselves from history. As time goes on, she is relentlessly bullied and humiliated by Neo Descal- especially Grouza until Aqual snaps and attempts to assassinate both leaders. She fails in killing Grouza, and only manages to wound Garade. She is saved from a vengeful Garade by the arrival of King Neo Descal himself.

Aqual soon grows wise to the schemes of the new leaders, and how they have used Cyclead and herself to further their plans. However, she still has to fight against her own pride before she can accept the trust of Sazer-X and finally side with them. She is jealous at Thundera because of Blaird liking her. She is secretly in love with Blaird.

==== Wind Shogun Cyclead ====
The inventor of the Three Shoguns, Wind Shogun Cyclead (風将軍サイクリード, Kaze Shōgun Saikrīdo) is clearly the most intelligent of them, and invents many of the devices that they use in their plans. However, he is also the least dedicated to the plan to take over Earth.

After their original pirate ship is destroyed, he constantly advocates abandoning the whole plan and returning to space. However, he is bullied into staying by Aqual's forceful personality. Because of his inventing abilities, he constantly gets all the credit for the plans implemented by Neo Descal, because even if Aqual came up with the plan it is his machines that get the attention.

When Neo Descal himself arrives to the present, Cyclead is brainwashed with a more aggressive, sadistic personality in order to serve as a distraction while King Neo Descal's real plan is put into motion. He is eventually rescued by Sazer-X, and sides with them and the other two Shoguns.

=== Allies and Friends ===
==== Lightning Shogun Thundera ====
The fourth Shogun, Lightning Shogun Thundera (雷将軍サンダーラ, Rai Shōgun Sandāra ,25) is the direct descendant of the shoguns that chose to stay on Earth and live underground, as opposed to the shoguns that chose to flee to space. The door to the surface would only open every million years. A legend in her home stated that the first man she met on the surface world would be her destined man.

According to history, that man was supposed to be Fire Shogun Blaird. He would have obtained the last Cosmo Capsule from her, and that would have plunged the world into darkness. However, due to a mixup, the first man she saw was instead Takuto, and she instantly fell in love with him.

Though Takuto played along at first to obtain the Cosmo Capsule, he eventually confesses that he does not love her and can not live with her. Though she is heartbroken, Takuto apologizes and convinces her that he only had good intentions for his actions. Her heart is moved, and she gives him the last Cosmo Capsule before returning to the underground world.

==== Soujirou Ando ====
Grandfather of Takuto and Yui Ando. He knows about the Space Pirates and the Sazer-X because of his meeting with Captain Shark in the 1960s. He is a good friend of Commander Shark.

==== Haruko and Yui Ando ====
In Episode 38 (final), Yui Ando was chosen by Cosmo Capsules to become one of 12 warriors to make a glorious future.

Haruko Ando is a mother of Takuto and Yui is his younger sister. They make General Blaird as their housemaid and order him to wash the laundry. They also teach Blaird a good lesson about love and friendliness.

==== Riki ====
Appears in the movie, the crossover with JustiRisers and GranSazers. Riki comes from Borumusei of the third galaxy where it was conquered by the reviving Bosquito. He comes from a lightning shock and "loses" his memory (meaning the Space Pirates made him a spy to capture the remaining Cosmo Capsules). Ad sees him as an enemy but Takuto sees him also as a friend. Riki befriends Takuto and Capsazer G2. General Aqual wants him to give G2 to her but Gordo and the TwinSazers save him from Aqual and her grunts. He also brings fourth the GranSazers from the slab, due to the universe reacting to his love, justice and courage, to destroy the remaining Bosquitos. After the battle, Riki reunites his lost parents. At the end, Takuto and Remy bring Riki's family to their home planet.

==== Commander Jinguji ====
Appears in the movie, the crossover with JustiRisers and GranSazers. Jinguji is the commander of his forces, inventor and builder of Gouten, a submarine-like aircraft armed with a massive giant drill. He is Sojirou Ando's best friend. He helps the Sazer-X to destroy the fake JustiRisers (Bosquitos) on the Sazer Island where Mio Tendo fainted. After his aircraft regains its energy, he orders his comrades to freeze the Mammoth Bosquito (to lose the monster's shield which reveals to be its horn as its weakness) so that the Sazer-X, JustiRisers and GranSazers would able to destroy it.

==== JustiRisers and Mio Tendo ====
Appears in the movie, the crossover with JustiRisers and GranSazers. Mio Tendo meets Takuto, Ad and Kane playing their basketball game and then the four rescues Riki who is fainted by thundershock. Afterwards, Shouta, Shinya and Yuka, the original JustiRisers, witness the invasion of the revived Bosquitos, disguised as fake JustiRisers, getting energy from innocent lives. Before the invasion, Mio Tendo is in Sazer Island praying for more power of justice but instead the powers went to Bosquito and she faints. They are almost gets victimized until Sazer-X team saves them from Bosquito's attack and later goes into the meeting with Commander Jinguji, Sojirou and Professor Ichiro Horiguchi. The three are getting into Sazer Island and they wake Mio. She prays again for the power of justice and the three transforms into the Real JustiRisers to beat the remaining Bosquitos who lost their disguise. They help the GranSazers and Sazer-X to finish off Bosquitos and Mammoth Bosquito.

==== Professor Ichiro Horiguchi and GranSazers ====
Appears in the movie, the crossover with JustiRisers and GranSazers. Ichiro Horiguchi attends a meeting with Commander Jinguji concerning about the return of Bosquito who is swarming all over Japan. He meets Sojirou Ando, Shouta, Shinya, Yuka and Sazer-X team and he tells that the entire team of GranSazers are not in the meeting but their powers are in the ancient slab holding by him. He tries to summon the GranSazers with the ancient slab but Riki wants to try it and then GranSazers are successfully summoned to finish off the remaining Bosquitos.

=== Villains ===
==== Space Pirate Fleet Descal ====
- Captain Barder (formerly): Leader of the Descal Fleet, was eventually revealed to be a robot before his ship was destroyed in a battle with Sazer-X.
- Fire Shogun Blaird (formerly)
- Water Shogun Aqual (formerly)
- Wind Shogun Cyclead (formerly)

==== Future Space Pirate Fleet Neo Descal ====
Space Pirates from the future, who forced their way through the wormhole in order to back up Descal's Three Shoguns after Barder was destroyed and ensure that their plan to take over the Earth in the past was successful. Although they had open disdain for the Three Shoguns, they risk not killing them as it would erase themselves from history.

- King Neo Descal (ネオデスカル, Neo Desukaru): Neo Descal's ruler, he sent Garade and Grouza to the past to ensure the Neo Descal fleet's existence. But due to their failures, he personally travelled back in time to ensure a future of darkness. Instead of using the Cosmo Capsules to plunge the world into darkness as history dictated, he planned on constructing a massive machine on the Moon called the Dark-Alumer (Dark Armor in Filipino dubbed version) to accomplish this task. He transformed into Black Lio to battle against Lio-Sazer inside the giant monster. He was defeated by Lio-Sazer, however, his memory was still alive. Lio-Sazer, Eagle-Sazer, Beetle-Sazer, and Blaird destroyed the inside part of the monster (Neo Descal's memory) while Remy piloted Great Lio to use the finishing move "Howling Crush" to destroy Neo Descal's monster to make darkness disappear.
- Barreda (バレーダ, Barēda): Barreda was his loyal second-in-command. Her power is icy wind from her breath to freeze victims. She was killed by Neo Descal in Episode 37 when she was of no further use to him.
- Garade (ガレイド, Gareido): Garade was the commander of the fleet, and an extremely powerful, though grumpy warrior. He possessed the ability to split into three clones of himself, each equal in power to a member of Sazer-X. He is killed when King Neo Descal arrives from the future and kills Garade for his failures.
- Grouza (グローザ, Gurōza): Grouza was the technical genius of the fleet, with intelligence matching that of Cyclead. She is the descendant of Blaird when he met and married Thundra. However, this event was undone and resulted with Grorza erased from existence.

==== Jackall ====
A mercenary working for Neo Descal, Jackall (ジャッカル, Jakkaru) uses his position to get revenge on Commander Shark. Jackall being Commander Shark's archenemy because he believes that Shark, his one-time friend, betrayed him by leaving him behind in cold stasis, when in truth Shark had to do that to protect him from Neo Descal's wrath.

He possesses powers similar to that of Sazer-X, and is able to equip a high-powered suit of armor with the transformation call "Souchaku!" ("Equip!"). Despite working as part of Neo-Descal, he frequently disobeys orders in his quest for vengeance. He keeps losing against Shark but refuses to give up no matter how beaten up he is. He eventually dies from these prolonged injuries right in the middle of a battle, showing Blaird the futility of his strife and the consequences of hatred.

==== Pirates and Kaijin ====
- Lightning Pirate Raideg
- Water Pirate Agurag
- Wind Pirate Lezekka
- Wind Pirate Sandstorm
- Gadaru Alien
- Fire Pirate Bankein
- Kaijin Dolpick
- Kaijin Pierce
- Kaijin Rebolt
- Kaijin Zeoria
- Kaijin Aligod
- Kaijin Dagos
- Kaijin Gulnada
- Kaijin Ultimate
- Kaijin Devider

==== Space Giant Beast and Future Beast ====
- Space Giant Beast Reizaus (レイザースReizāsu)
- Space Giant Beast Winmiller (ウィンミラーWinmirā)
- Space Giant Beast Bardress (バードレスBādoresu)
- Giant Beast Big Stag (ビグスタッグBigusutaggu)
- Giant Beast Graptor (グラプターGuraputā)
- Future Beast Deathbaa (デスバーDesubā)
- Future Beast Neo Deathbaa (ネオデスバーNeodesubā)
- Future Beast Diros (ディロスDirosu)
- Combine Beast Reimirad (レイミラードReimirādo)
- Mecha Giant Beast Megarion (メガリオンMegarion)
- Darkness Beast Dark Geran (ダークゲランDākugeran)

==== Gig Fighter ====
Space Pirate's Combatants (Chouseishin Gransazer) Also appeared over. It has a weapon such as a knife, it is also possible to attack the enemy wrapped own body to green light ball.

== Cosmo Capsules ==
Cosmo Capsules are those that can equip the Sazers their power by inserting it into his weapon, while the Space Pirates use them to create monsters. If either of them can collect all of the Cosmo Capsules, they can wish for something.

- Lio-1 (Lio-Sazer)
  A Cosmo Capsule that was given to Takuto by his Grandpa.
  - Lio Fire
    When Lio-Sazer spins his weapon around, a lion will dash through the target/enemy and destroys it with a big explosion. The most powerful of all Cosmo Capsule attacks.
- Eagle-2 (Eagle-Sazer)
  This Cosmo Capsule is kept by Soujiro Ando
  - Eagle Typhoon
    Similar to Lio Fire, but destroys an enemy rapidly as an eagle flies through to the enemy and destroys it.
- Beetle-3 (Beetle-Sazer)
  This Cosmo Capsule is kept by Soujiro Ando
  - Beetle Slash
    This Cosmo Capsule creates a powerful lightning as a beetle flies through the enemy and destroys it.
- Shark-4 (Shark-Sazer)
  This Cosmo Capsule is found after a riddle, can be used only by Captain Shark
  - Shark Rush
    This Cosmo Capsule is similar also to Lio Fire but it creates a whirlpool as the shark shoots to the enemy.
- Wolf-5
  This Cosmo Capsule is found in a rock mountain (1st Episode)
  - Similar also to Lio-1, a wolf will dash through the target/enemy and destroys it with a big explosion.
  - If used by Kane, Wolf Dash
- Swan-6
  This Cosmo Capsule is found in 3rd Episode by Aqual
  - Swan-6 gives the Sazer Hyper speed. A swan will dash in a tornado through the target/enemy and destroys it. Commander Shark equips the Swan-6 with the ice attack Swan Blizzard(Episode 22).
- Stagbeetle-7
  This Cosmo Capsule is found in National Enterprise Company (2nd Episode)
  - Creates a powerful lightning from a stag beetle's horn. When Eagle-Sazer uses the Stagbeetle-7, a powerful lightning Stag Mistal blasts out from Eagle-Blaster to stun the enemy.
- Spearfish-8
  A Spearfish will dash with its drill-like horn through the enemy and destroys it with a splash.
- Ox-9
  This Cosmo Capsule is similar to Lio Fire, an ox dashes through toward the enemy and destroys it. The Ox can also serve as a shield, using its huge horns and great strength to impede incoming objects.
- Pigeon-10
  This Cosmo Capsule targets an enemy by Pigeon-Cutter attack.
- Mantis-11
  Healing people when inserted into the Eagle-Blaster with the Healing Mantis attack.
- Whale-12
  When inserted into Beet-Hawk it does the Whale Squall attack and when inserted to Eagle-Blaster it does the Whale Leap attack.

== Ryuuseishin ==
=== Core-Caliber ===
The center of the main three Sazer-X mecha formations. It is a humanoid black-and-white fighter (Core-Braver) which is stored upon Lio-Carrier. It is armed with various attacks such as "Core Lasers", 'Brave Shot' which involves firing missiles and its finishing move 'Core Buster'. When hit by an "Optimize Beam" from one of the three Sazer ships, the Core-Caliber can combine with that ship to form a new, more powerful mecha called a Ryuuseishin (Shooting Star God). The transformation/combination call is "X Formation!"

For most of the series, only one Core-Caliber exists. However, towards the end two more are created, allowing all four Ryuuseishin to be formed at the same time.

=== Ryuuseishin Great-Lio ===
Formed when the Lio-Carrier ship combines with the Core-Caliber. Piloted by Lio-Sazer and crewed by Capsazer G2 and Remy, Great-Lio specializes in close combat and grappling. Its weapon is the Lio-Cutter, a pair of longswords which can be combined to form the Lio-Javelin, a double-bladed spear.

Its powerful attack is Lio-Impact, where it fires devastating shockwaves from the lion's mouth on its chest.

Its finishing move is the massively powerful Howling Crush, where the Fire energy from the Lio-Javelin smashes into the enemy and obliterates it.

=== Ryuuseishin Wind-Eagle ===
Formed when the Adle-Eagle ship combines with the Core-Caliber. Piloted by Eagle-Sazer and crewed by Gordo, Wind-Eagle specializes in fast, mid-range attacks. Its weapon is the Eagle-Rifle and its finishing move is "Twister Shoot", a series of powered rapid-fire shots from the Eagle-Rifle.

=== Ryuuseishin Magna-Beet ===
Formed when the Beet-Vizor ship combines with the Core-Caliber. Piloted by Beetle-Sazer and crewed by Twin-Sazer Ein and Twin-Sazer Zwein, Magna-Beet specializes in powerful long range attacks.

Its many weapons include the Megaro-Cannon, the large power cannon on its head. Impact-Cannon, the series of blaster cannons that make up its fingers, Beet Cannon, a pair of larger cannons located on either side of its head, and Beet Missile, a set of missile launchers located on each arm.

Its finishing move is "Beet Buster", where it fires a continuous, charged burst of energy from the cannon on its navel.

=== Ryuuseishin Shark-Leaguer ===
Shark-Sazer's personal Ryuuseishin. Unlike the other members of Sazer-X, he does not need to combine his ship with a Core-Calibur in order to form a Ryuuseishin. Instead, the Shark Leaguer takes off from Commander Shark's ship, the Shark-Base, and undergoes a simple transformation into its Ryuuseishin form with the command "X Formation!". Its weapon is Sword-Pressure and its finishing move is "Hydro Slash".

=== Drill-Angler ===
The personal mecha of Jackall. Like the Shark-Leaguer, it functions both as a ship and as a combat mecha, undergoing a transformation activated by the call "Battle Formation!". Its specialty is close-range combat, and its main weapons are the massive, powerful drill mounted on its chest and the jagged cutters on its arms.

Fire Shogun Blaird inherits the machine after Jackall, using it to assist Sazer-X and their mecha.

== All Episodes ==
1. Takuto's on Fire! (拓人は燃えているか!, Takuto wa Moeteiruka!)
2. Burn up! Great-Lio (燃えろ! グレートライオ, Moero! Gurēto-Raio)
3. White Whirlwind! Wind-Eagle (白い旋風! ウインドイーグル!, Shiroi Senpu! Uindo-Īguru)
4. Blue Lighting! Magna-Beet (青い稲妻! マグナビート, Aoi Inazuma! Maguna-Bīto)
5. Explore! The Hidden Shark 4 (探検!シャーク4を探せ, Tanken! Shāku 4 o sagase)
6. Our Hero (ぼくたちのヒーロー, Bokutachi no Hīrō)
7. Recollection 1960 (追憶・1960, Tsuioku 1960)
8. Significant Cloth Holiday (由衣の休日, Yukoromo no Kyūjitsu)
9. History's 3 Worst Days (史上最悪の3日間, Shijō Saiaku no 3 Nichikan)
10. The Captain's True Form (船長の正体, Senchō no Shōtai)
11. Father, Returns (父、帰る, Chichi, Kaeru)
12. Decisive Battle at the Other Side's Sky (決戦は空の彼方で, Kessen wa Sora no Achirade)
13. Sacred Night (聖なる夜に, Seinaru Yoru ni)
14. Enemy From The Future, Neo Descal (未来からの敵、ネオデスカル, Mirai kara no Teki, Neodesukaru)
15. Close Call! Enter Shark-Sazer (危機一髪! シャークセイザー登場, Kiki Ippatsu! Shāku-Seizā Tōjō)
16. Super Flow! Shark-Sazer (超流! シャークリーガー, Chōryū! Shāku-Seizā)
17. A Pursuer, The Name is Jackal (追跡者、名はジャッカル, Tsuisekisha, Na wa Jakkaru)
18. Severe Earthquake! Drill Angler (激震! ドリルアングラー, Gekishin! Doriru Angurā)
19. Equipping Ad! Face The Future (装着アド! 未来に向かって, Souchaku Ado! Mirai ni Mukatte)
20. Kane, A Traitor's Scratch (ケイン、裏切りの刻!, Kein, Uragiri no Kiza)
21. A Free Kick Towards Victory (勝利へのフリーキック, Shouri e no Furīkikku)
22. The Threatening Transformation! Drill Angler (脅威の変形! ドリルアングラー, Kyōi no Henkei! Doriru Angurā)
23. Mission X! Save the Captain (ミッションX! 艦長を救え, Misshon X! Kanchō wo Sukue)
24. The Fourth Shogun (第四の将軍, Dai Yon no Shōgun)
25. The Recreated History (変わり始めた歴史, Kawari Hajimeta Rekishi)
26. Remy's Tears, G2's Heart (レミーの涙、G2の心, Remī no Namida, G2 no Kokoro)
27. X Day The End of the Battle (Ｘデー・戦いの果て)
28. Invasion! A New War Potential? (侵入!新たなる戦力？, Shinyū! Aratanaru Senryoku?)
29. Escape From the Strange Dimension (異空間からの脱出, Ikūkan no Dasshutsu)
30. The Inheriting Thoughts (受け継がれる思い, Uketsugareru Omoi)
31. Showdown! Blaird vs Cyclead (対決!ブレアードVSサイクリード, Taiketsu! Bureādo VS Saikrīdo)
32. Fierce Fight! Triple Core Braver (激闘!トリプル・コアブレイバー, Gekitou! Toripuru Koa Bureibā)
33. Friends Who Believe Together (信じあう仲間, Shinjiau Nakama)
34. The 12 Piece Gathering? Cosmo Capsule (12個集結？コスモカプセル, Jūnika Shūketsu? Kosumo Kapuseru)
35. The Brightening Remy's Past (明かされるレミーの過去, Akasareru Remī no Kako)
36. The Dark Corrosion, Dark Almer (闇の侵蝕、ダークアルマー, Yami no Shinshoku, Dāku Arumā)
37. Takuto, Into the Darkness (拓人、闇の中へ, Takuto, Yami no Naka e)
38. The Friendship Crosses Time... (友情は時空を越えて…, Yuujou wa Toki wo Koete...)

== Songs ==
Opening theme

- "Chousei Kantai Sazer-X" (超星艦隊セイザーX, Chōsei Kantai Seizā Ekkusu)
  - Lyrics: Hiroshi Yamada
  - Composition: Nao Asada
  - Arrangement: Tatsumi Yano
  - Artist: Hiroki Takahashi

Ending theme

- "Jump da! Bokura no Sazer-X!!" (ジャンプだ！僕らのセイザーX!!, Janpu da! Bokura no Seizā Ekkusu!!; "Jump! Our Sazer-X!!")
  - Lyrics: Hiroshi Yamada
  - Composition: Yasuo Kosugi
  - Arrangement: Tatsumi Yano
  - Artist: Hiroki Takahashi

Movie theme

- "New Horizon ~ Tatakae! Hoshi no Senshitachi" (New Horizon～戦え! 星の戦士たち; "New Horizon ~ Fight! Warriors of the Stars")
  - Artist: King Kong Kojiwara

== Cast ==
- Ryosuke Takahashi: Takuto Ando/Lio Sazer; Soujirou Ando (young)
- Mami Matsuyama: Remi Freedle
- Gaku Shindo: Ad/Eagle Sazer
- Ryosuke Miura: Kane/Beetle Sazer
- Hiroshi Matsunaga: Commander Shark/Shark Sazer
- Robert Baldwin: Gordo
- Makoto Yasumura: Ein (Voice)
- Hiromi Ohtsuda: Zwein (Voice)
- Chinami Ishizaka: Patora
- Kentarou Itou: Blaird (Voice)
- Yuu Asakura: Aqual
- Daisuke Kishino: Cyclead
- Masayo Kurata: Thundara
- Eizou Tsuda: Neo Descal
- Issei Futamata: Garade
- Mitsuki Ishikawa: Grorza
- Masa Sato: Barreda

Preceded by Genseishin Justirisers	Chouseishin Series; 2005 – 2006	Succeeded by none
