= Chouseishin Series =

Japanese TV superhero franchise

ChouSeiShin Series
- The official logo of the Chouseishin Series introduced in 2004/2005 during the run of Genseishin Justirisers
- Created by: Toho Company, Ltd. and Konami
- Years: 2003-2006

Films and television
- Film: Chousei Kantai Sazer-X the Movie: Fight! Star Warriors (2005)
- Television series: Chouseishin Gransazer (2003–2004); Genseishin Justirisers (2004–2005); Chousei Kantai Sazer-X (2005–2006)
- Television specials: Chouseishin Gransazer: Super Battle Memory (2005); Genseishin Justirisers: Super Battle Memory (2005)

Miscellaneous
- Type: Tokusatsu superhero TV franchise

The Chouseishin Series (Japanese: 超星神シリーズ, Hepburn: Chōseishin Shirīzu) is a tokusatsu superhero TV franchise which debuted in Japan from 2003 through 2006. The Chouseishin Series was produced by Toho Company, Ltd., in association with Konami, to emulate and partner the success of Toei's Super Sentai and Kamen Rider series.

== The Chouseishin Series ==
- Chouseishin Gransazer (超星神グランセイザー, Chōseishin Guranseizā) - 2003/2004
  The first of the Chouseishin series, the Gransazers involves a group of 12 ordinary people who have the power to transform and don the Gransazer battle suits, that were created by an ancient race of humans, before an alien alliance wiped them out millions of years ago for being a threat to the universe. The Gransazers are divided into four tribes: flame, wind, earth, and water. Each tribe has a mechanoid called a Chouseishin, which they can summon only when the three GranSazers of each tribe join together and use their Knuckle Risers. With their Chouseishin, the Cloud Dragon, and Guntras, the Gransazers combat alien threats from the alliance that intend to finish what they started. However, near the series finale, the GranSazers learn the truth of what occurred in the past and try to clear humanity of the charges placed against it by a devious member of the alliance.
- Genseishin Justirisers (幻星神ジャスティライザー, Genseishin Jasutiraizā) - 2004/2005
  The second of the Chouseishin series, the Justirisers involves a group of three people who were given the power to transform and don the Justiriser battle suits, powered by the Justicrystal which is sought by the forces of the Hadess Army under Kaiser Hadess. Eventually joined by their former enemy Demon Knight, the bearer of the Riser Stone, Riser-Shirogane defeats Kaiser Hadess and then the JustiRisers contend with Hadess older brother Majin Daruga who seeks both powers for his own use.
- Chousei Kantai Sazer-X (超星艦隊セイザーX, Chōsei Kantai Seizā Ekkusu) - 2005/2006
  The last of the Chouseishin series, it opens to Earth in the year 2500 when it has been taken over by a group of space pirates known as Neo-Descal. The remaining members of the human resistance send their trump card weapons, the three Ryuuseishin warships to the past to try and change the future by defeating Neo-Descal's ancestors, the Descal fleet, when they invade Earth in 2005. Along with the Ryuuseishin comes Ad, captain of the Adle-Eagle squad and his right-hand man, Gordo; Kane, captain of the Beet-Vizor squad; the twin Sazers Ein and Zwein; and Remy, who pilots Great Lio. Ad and Kane are joined by Takuto Andou, whose grandfather met Captain Shark, leader of the resistance, as a young man and was left with a Knuckle Cross to allow his grandson in 2005 to become the third member of the team known as Sazer-X.

== TV specials ==
- Chouseishin Gransazer: Super Battle Memory (2005)
- Genseishin Justirisers: Super Battle Memory (2005)

== Movie ==
- Chousei Kantai Sazer-X the Movie: Fight! Star Warriors - 2005

== Trademark themes ==
- "Souchaku" (meaning "Equip") is the series' trademark henshin call, yet in the Philippine and English dubs of Gransazers, they replaced it with "Transform" in Cartoon Network Philippines, GMA, and Hero. There were Gransazers VCDs in the Philippines dubbed in English with the style used in Cartoon Network Philippines, except episodes 37-40. In Justirisers, Filipino dubbers from Hero Channel and English dubbers from Cartoon Network Philippines used "Transform", while those from GMA had used both "Transform" and "Equip" for the whole series. Meanwhile, in Sazer-X, Filipino dubbers discontinued the use of "Transform" and replaced it with "Equip" in Hero and "Gear Up" in GMA, while the dubbers in Cartoon Network Philippines used "Power Up".
- "Dive In" is the series' trademark command for entering inside a particular Star God.
- In Justirisers, the Filipino dubbers of both Hero Channel and GMA used "Justiriser" instead of "Riser" to prefix the heroes' names so that Riser Glen was known as Justiriser Glen, Riser Kageri was known as Justiriser Kageri, and Riser Gant was known as Justiriser Gant, although they also used the prefix "Riser" in some episodes.

== References to Godzilla ==
- The Maser Cannons, usually seen in Godzilla films, are seen in the series.
- Several Toho daikaiju, many of them from the Godzilla franchise, are lampooned in the series, including monster designs and monster roars; similar to what Ultra Q did in the past.
- The Gotengo from the 1963 Toho film Atragon and the 2004 Toho film Godzilla: Final Wars appears in Sazer X the movie.

== Other media ==
- Riser Glen and Lio-Sazer featured in a professional wrestling match for HUSTLE with Kenzo Suzuki and Hiroko Suzuki, which they won.

== See also ==
- Super Sentai
- Dennou Keisatsu Cybercop
- Power Rangers
- Seven Star Fighting God Guyferd
- Choukou Senshi Changéríon
- Madan Senki Ryukendo
- Tomica Hero Series
