= Gaku Shindo =

Japanese actor and singer

- 進藤 学
- Born: Hironobu Ninagawa; January 7, 1980 (age 46); Tokyo, Japan
- Years active: 2005 - present
- Agent: Ohta Production

Gaku Shindo (進藤 学, Shindō Gaku; born Hironobu Ninagawa (蜷川 博信, Ninagawa Hironobu) on January 7, 1980, in Tokyo, Japan) is a Japanese actor and singer. His debut role was as the Eagle Sazer in the tokusatsu series Chousei Kantai Sazer-X, but he is most well known for playing Harukaze Kurobane in the Prince of Tennis musicals in 2006.

Before he debuted in showbiz, he was a tango dancer and instructor.

== Filmography ==
=== TV Series ===
- Onna rule as Jun (NTV, 2013)
- Shuchakueki Shirizu Ushio keiji VS jiken kisha Saeko 9-to (TV Asahi, 2012)
- Medical investigator Mr. Kazuichi Noguchi as Omiyama (Fuji TV, 2011)
- Kaizoku Sentai Gokaiger as Special Duty Officer Barizorg/Sid Bamick (TV Asahi, 2011)
- Majo Saiban (The Witch Trial) (Fuji TV, 2009)
- Oretachi wa Tenshi da! (TV Tokyo, 2009, ep 9)
- Gokusen 3 as Narita (NTV, 2008, ep 5)
- Tokyo Ghost Trip as 'Reaper' (Tokyo MX, 2008)
- Guren Onna as 'Kenduka Kogoro' (TV Tokyo, 2008)
- Four Lies as 'Sakamoto' (TV Asahi, July - December 2008)
- Fuma no Kojiro as 'Ryoma' (Tokyo MX, 2007)
- Sakurasho no Onnatachi (Women Police Sakura) as 'Yamato Sho' (TV Asahi, 2007)
- Happy Boys as 'Inada Gen/Silk' (TV Tokyo, 2007)
- Doyo Wide Gekijo (Saturday Wide Theater: in 'Disguise' 3) as 'Investigator Aso Yuki' (TV Asahi, 2006)
- Aru Ai no Uta (Love Story) (TBS, 2006)
- Chousei Kantai Sazer-X as 'Ad'/Eagle Sazer (TV Tokyo, Nov 2005 - June 2006)

=== Films ===
- Kaizoku Sentai Gokaiger the Movie: The Flying Ghost Ship as Special Duty Officer Barizorg (voice) (2011)
- Gokaiger Goseiger Super Sentai 199 Hero Great Battle as Special Duty Officer Barizorg (voice) (2011)
- Toricon!!! Triple Complex Returns as Esu/'Ace' (2008)
- Toricon!!! Triple Complex as Esu/'Ace' (2008)
- Chousei Kantai Sazer X - Tatakae! Hoshi no Senshitachi (Toho, 2005)

== TV Programs ==
- Today's Health (NHK, April 2006 - March 2007)
- Eight men & women entertainers desert island castaway Diary (TV Tokyo, 2006)
- Waratte Ii tomo! You're Laughing! (Fuji TV, 2006)

== Stage Performances ==
- Snow White (2011)
- La Corda d’oro as Kanazawa Hiroto (Kanayan) (2010)
- Murder Factory (2010)
- Knock Out Brother X (2009)
- Letter as 'Takeshi Shima' (2008)
- Fuma no Kojiro - the musical as 'Ryoma' (2007)
- PIPPIN - broadway musical (2007)
- Tennis no Ojisama Prince of Tennis as 'Kurobane Harukaze' (2006)

== Internet Radio ==
- MRW (March 2007 - May 2008)
- MRW-X (currently ongoing from April 2008)

== Discography ==
=== Album ===
- MRW Mini Album - Shindo Gaku, Kiriyama Ren & Chieko Higuchi (Feb 27, 2008)

=== Soundtracks & CDs ===
- Toricon!!! Triple Complex' original soundtrack (2008)
- 'Fuma no Kojiro' original soundtrack (Dec, 2007)
- 'Happy Boys' Image Collection 4 - Inada Gen (Shindo Gaku) (May, 2007)
- 'Prince of Tennis' musical best actor's series 006 - IRE as 'Amane Hikaru' & Shindo Gaku as 'Kurobane Harukaze' (Dec, 2006)

=== DVD ===
- 'Happy Boys' File. 1 - Kyoichi & Gen (Sept, 2007)
- Men's DVD series: R - Shindo Gaku (Feb, 2007)

=== Theme songs ===
- 'Beside on You' - Toricon!!! Triple Complex
- 'Shut it into the mirror' (Ryoma) - Fuma no Kojiro
- 'Tenshi no Namida' - Happy Boys

== Photobook ==
- Majestic (2007)

== Dance Performances ==
- TANGORIBERUTA (2003)
- Argentinian tango at a dinner party

He also appeared in other tango events as a professional dancer.
