= Chouseishin Gransazer =

2003 Japanese TV series

- Title card
- Genre: Tokusatsu; Superhero fiction Action/Adventure
- Created by: Eberechi Azu
- Developed by: Eberechi Azu
- Written by: Eberechi Azu
- Directed by: Eberechi Azu
- Starring: Ryou Segawa; Asuka Shimizu; Kouhei Takeda; Hideaki Serizawa; Maya Hoshino; Ren Matsuzawa; Tomohide Takahara; Sayaka Isoyama; Soji Masaki; Hideki Okada; Kumiko Ito; Takuma Sugawara; Soichiro Akaboshi; Shunsaku Kudo; Tomonori Yoshida; Shinnosuke Abe; Marie Sada
- Narrated by: Eberechi Azu, Cathy Azu, AGUIYI Azu
- Opening theme: "Life Goes On" by U-ya Asaoka
- Ending theme: "Kimi o Tsurete Iku" by Asami Abe
- Country of origin: Japan
- No. of episodes: 51

Production
- Executive producer: Eberechi Azu
- Camera setup: Multi
- Running time: 25 minutes (per episode)

Original release
- Network: TV Tokyo
- Release: October 4, 2003 – September 25, 2004

Related
- Genseishin Justirisers

Chouseishin Gransazer (Japanese: 超星神グランセイザー, Hepburn: Chōseishin Guranseizā; English: /tʃoʊseɪʃɪn ˈɡrænseɪzər/) (translated into English as Ultra Star God Gransazer or Super Star God Gransazer, also known simply as The Gransazers) is a Japanese drama produced by Toho Company Ltd. and Konami. The series aired on TV Tokyo from October 4, 2003, to September 25, 2004, with 51 half-hour episodes. This series is the first of Toho's "Seishin (Star God)" series.

The premise of this series is similar to both the Super Sentai series and the manga/anime series Saint Seiya: there are 12 heroes, divided into four tribes, and each tribe has a giant transforming robot. The events and characters are described below, using in-universe tone.

== Plot ==
Some 400,000,000 years after caveman was destroyed by aliens, 12 direct descendants of the civilization's warriors (called "Sazers") have their powers awakened and form four tribes: Flame, Wind, Earth, and Water. Each Sazer is based on a Zodiac sign represented in an animal totem or spirit representation. At first, the Gransazer tribes waged war against each other. However, after discovering the truth about their ancestry and the reason for their awakening, they united. Together, they worked to protect Earth from the Warp Monarch, an alliance of alien species, from extinguishing all life on the planet once again.

== The GranSazers ==
Descendants of the warriors from the ancient human civilization, they later learn that the GranSazers were created to protect Earth from the Bosquito. Each GranSazer is marked by a glowing symbol, corresponding to their astrological sign, on the back of their left hand. This symbol can turn into a Knuckle-Riser. By setting the Knuckle-Riser to "Transformation Mode", they can equip high-powered suits that transform them into GranSazers. Their transformation call is "Equip!" (装着, Sōchaku!)

GranSazer is composed by 12 members split amongst four elements. When three members of the same element have been awakened and gathered, a Tribe is formed. When three members gather and set their Knuckle-Risers to ChouSeiShin mode, they can summon a machine of incredible power called an Ultra Star God (超星神, Chōseishin). Once a Tribe's respective ChouSeiShin has been summoned, one member can set their Knuckle-Riser to "Boarding Mode" to "Dive-In" and board their ChouSeiShin. The one who is on their ChouSeiShin can change into a giant folding robot. The other two GranSazers would later pilot jetfighters called Gran Vehicles.

Each GranSazer also has their own unique weapon, which can be summoned by setting their Knuckle-Riser to "Arms Mode". When piloting their respective ChouSeiShin, they can equip the ChouSeiShin with a large version of their personal weapon by setting their Knuckle-Riser to "Sazer-Gear Mode". They can also communicate with other Sazers by setting the Knuckle-Riser to "Communication Mode".

The GranSazers can also perform a combination attack called "Formation Zero". The attack involves Sazer-Tarious, Sazer-Mithras, Sazer-Lion, Sazer-Dail, Sazer-Tragos and Sazer-Pisces all performing a sandwich jump kick on the enemy.

=== Flame Tribe ===
The Flame Tribe or Fire Tribe (炎のトライブ, Honō no Toraibu) are the first tribe to recognize the alien threat and the second to be fully assembled. From the very beginning, they were assisted by Professor Horiguchi, who helped them realize their duty as Gransazers. The Flame warriors are carrying bird-shaped armour with red-based colours and they pilot the Flame-Driver Grand Vehicles. This tribe is also the one and only tribe which has two members (Tarious and Lion) that can equip Garuda with a large version of their personal weapon by setting their Knuckle-Riser to "Sazer Gear Mode" rather than other tribes which only their leader (Remls, Tawlon and Gorbion) can use this mode on their ChouSeiShin.

==== Sazer Tarious ====
Tenma Kudou (弓道 天馬, Kudō Tenma), born on December 14, 1983, is a rash postman, usually going in head first. Within his temper, Tenma transformed for the first time after being harassed by Sazer-Velsou. Immediately afterwards, he defeated Velsou. Often locking horns with Mika and the others, he doesn't quite like being made the leader, but he accepts the role. Tenma cares a lot about his comrades as well as about the world he lives. Despite frequently bickering with Mika, Tenma developed a serious crush on her as the show progresses.

With his Knuckle Riser, Tenma transforms into Sazer Tarious (セイザータリアス, Seizā Tariasu), the Flame warrior under the sign of Sagittarius, his red armour is shaped after a falcon. Sazer Tarious is the leader of Flame Tribe and also the leader of all 12 Gransazers as well.

Sazer-Tarious' main weapon is the Falcon Bow, a bow and arrow set situated on the left wrist (in place of the Knuckle Riser). It can fire Flame-powered shots and even a continuous stream of fiery arrows. Its finishing attack called "Burning Falcon", which involves the shooting of a giant fiery arrow from the Falcon Bow. His second attack is the "Cosmo Punch", in which Sazer-Tarious jumps up, then spins towards his adversary before striking with a flaming outstretched fist.

==== Sazer Mithras ====
Mika Shidou (獅堂 未加, Shidō Mika), born April 6, 1983, is the tomboyish elder sister of Ken and the wise member of the Flame Tribe. Having helped Professor Horiguchi with his research, she was the first Sazer to be awakened. Her cool and reserved attitude often clashes with the bright personality of Tenma, but when push comes to shove she proves to be a true friend and is fond of him as well.

With her Knuckle Riser, Mika transforms into Sazer Mithras (セイザーミトラス, Seizā Mitorasu), the flame warrior under the sign of Aries; her white and red armour is shaped after a swan. Her main weapons are the Swan Sector, a pair of fans. Its finishing attack, known as the "Brand Tornado", resembles a blast from a flamethrower tornado.

Mika later makes a cameo appearance in Justirisers Episode 35, when she injured Shouta because she thought that he was a stalker. When asked by Yuka, she said that she had such skills because she used them in what she used to do, being a 'friend of justice'.

==== Sazer Lion ====
Ken Shidou (獅堂 剣, Shidō Ken), born August 3, 1986, is Mika's younger brother by three years. Ken is the last member of Flame Tribe to be awakened; this happened when he wants to save his sister from being defeated by Ryoko and Jin and at the same time, Akira attacks the unactivated Garuda with Dolcrus. He is the calm-and-collected pole of the tribe, a shy but caring and compassionate person who deeply loves his sister. After meeting Ran, he developed a crush on her but did not admit it.

With his Knuckle Riser, Ken transforms into Sazer Lion (セイザーリオン, Seizā Rion), the flame warrior under the sign of Leo, his armour is shaped after a swallow in dark red colour with his arms coloured in black. His main weapons are the Double Crescent, a pair of swords. Its finishing attack, called "Hien Zan" (Flying Swallow Slash), resembles a large wave of fire.

=== Wind Tribe ===
The Wind Tribe (風のトライブ, Kaze no Toraibu) is the first tribe to be fully assembled, deceived by Akelon who disguised as Saeki Karin to attack the other GranSazers, especially Flame Tribe. After they realized that they were deceived, they turned against Karin and allied with the other GranSazers to defeat her. The Wind Tribe armoured suits are all insect-shaped with purple-based colours and pilot the Wind-Driver Grand Vehicles.

==== Sazer Remls ====
Back when he first met Karin, Akira Dentsuin (伝通院 洸, Dentsuin Akira), born May 24, 1975, was awakened as Sazer Remls, tricked by the Akelon into fighting the Flame Tribe. Akira, who works as a doctor was the one who stood by Karin's side the longest, fighting with Ryoko and Jin while still believing her. He may seem distant and cold but he is actually loyal and compassionate and if required, he can be a fierce fighter. He is the oldest GranSazer. Akira fell in love with Ai (Sazer-Pisces).

With his Knuckle Riser, Akira transforms into Sazer Remls (セイザーレムルズ, Seizā Remuruzu), the wind warrior under the sign of Gemini; his indigo armour is shaped after a Japanese rhinoceros beetle. Sazer-Remls is also the leader of Wind Tribe. Sazer-Remls' main weapon is the Iron Gale, a rifle cannon. Its finishing attack is called "Final Judgement", which is a concentrated ball of air. His second attack is the "Remls Tornado", a strong tornado blast from Remls' palm.

Dentsuin later makes a cameo appearance in Justirisers Episode 30, as the doctor who assessed Mio's condition.

==== Sazer Velsou ====
Recruited and recited by Karin as well, Ryouko Amamiya (雨宮 涼子, Amamiya Ryōko), born January 23, 1979, is the ambitious social worker of the Wind Tribe, aware of her unknown skills and with a dislike towards weaklings. Along with that, she is also rather calculating and intelligent. After realized that Mika did not kill her after being defeated in one-by-one battle, Ryoko started to doubt the motivations of Karin and became the first to leave the evil scientist, to be joined by Jin soon after. Under her personal training, Tappei has now become a freedom fighter. She fell in love with Naoto (Sazer-Tawlon) and they were finally married in the end of series.

With her Knuckle Riser, Ryouko transforms into Sazer Velsou (セイザーヴェルソー, Seizā Verusō), the wind warrior under the sign of Aquarius; her magenta-coloured armour is shaped after a butterfly. Sazer-Velsou's main weapons are the Sel Cross, a pair of bucklers. Its finishing attack is called "Full Moon Slash", which is a vertical slash of magenta-tinted air that charges at the target. Sazer-Velsou's second attack is the "Velsou Illusion", a psychokinetic attack that disables her enemies.

==== Sazer Dail ====
The final member of the Wind Tribe, Jin Hakariya (秤谷 仁, Hakariya Jin), born September 25, 1978, was bad books by Karin and joined them looking for fun rather than being devoted to his mission at first. He enjoys having his powers and playing around with them, always up for a challenge. Despite that, he enjoys teamwork and thus was soon convinced by Ryoko that the Sazers have to work as one big team. He often shows up just in time to level the odds.

With his Knuckle Riser, Jin transforms into Sazer Dail (セイザーダイル, Seizā Dairu), the wind warrior under the sign of Libra; his purple armor is shaped after a stag beetle. Sazer-Dail's main weapon are the Axe Tagger, axe-shaped tonfas. Its finishing attack is called "Dai Senpuu Haa" (Great Whirlwind Slash), which is a horizontal tornado blast.

=== Earth Tribe ===
The Earth Tribe (大地のトライブ, Daichi no Toraibu) is the third tribe to fully awaken. This tribe is the most divided one because each of the three members have conflicting personalities. Karin tried to enlist the Earth Tribe into her group, but failed, causing the Earth Tribe to fight together with the Flame Tribe. Their armored suits are shaped after four-legged mammals with yellow and orange-based colors, piloting the Earth-Driver Grand Vehicles.

==== Sazer Tawlon ====
Naoto Matsuzaka (松坂 直人, Matsuzaka Naoto), born May 5, 1977, was once a famous and highly prized fighter who is now mostly retired from the spotlight, going back to teaching young talents the ways of self-defense. When Naoto saw the battle between Garuda and Dolcrus, a lightning power from the sky transforms his body, thus awakens him as an Earth warrior. Often he is not to be found, for Naoto trains almost constantly. He fell in love with Ryoko (Sazer-Velsou) and they were finally married in the last episode.

With his Knuckle Riser, Naoto transforms into Sazer Tawlon (セイザータウロン, Seizā Tauron), the ground warrior under the sign of Taurus; his armor is shaped after a bull in yellow colour. Sazer-Tawlon is the leader of the Earth Tribe. Sazer-Tawlon's main weapon is the Bull Cannon, a pair of shoulder cannons. Its finishing attack is called "Matador Burst", which is a charged shot.

==== Sazer Tragos ====
The second member of the Earth Tribe is Gou Kamiya (神谷 豪, Kamiya Gō), born January 3, 1978. Gou is a serious, dedicated, and faithful policeman with a strong sense of justice. Gou suddenly transformed for the first time when he was attacked by Akaki Junya, a man that was believed to be the culprit of a robbery who was also Ran's friend. After Gou realizes that he is awakened as Earth warrior, he immediately aligns with the Flame Tribe and fights some duels with Jin. He fell in love with Professor Aya Stacy, an 18-year-old scientist.

With his Knuckle Riser, Gou transforms into Sazer Tragos (セイザートラゴス, Seizā Toragosu), the ground warrior under the sign of Capricorn; his amber-coloured armour is shaped after a horned goat. Sazer Tragos' main weapon is the Spiral Horn, a drill arm. Its finishing attack is called "Penetrate Thunder", which is a thunder-like drill attack that requires him to jump on the air and dive immediately to attack the enemy.

==== Sazer Visuel ====
The last member of Earth Tribe to be awakened, Ran Saotome (早乙女 蘭, Saotome Ran), born September 22, 1983, is a quirky and college student who met the Sazers when her childhood friend was accused of a crime which Gou and his policeman partner, Nanami were investigating. She was abducted by Karin and the Wind Tribe to be their ally, but she eventually fled. To protect Gou from a trigger-happy criminal named Ryuji Naito, she transformed into Sazer-Visuel for the first time.

With her Knuckle Riser, Ran transforms into Sazer Visuel (セイザーヴィジュエル, Seizā Visjueru), the ground warrior under the sign of Virgo; her orange armour is shaped after a female leopard. Sazer Visuel's main weapons are the Lady Claws, a pair of long and sharp claws. Its finishing attack is called "Night Scratch".

=== Water Tribe ===
The Water Tribe (水のトライブ, Mizu no Toraibu) was the last tribe to be fully assembled. Led by the strict and mistrusting war photographer Makoto, this tribe fought a while on their own. After they were fully assembled and awakened their ChouSeiShin, Leviathan, they joined the other Sazers. The armoured suits of Water Tribe are all shaped with sea animals with blue-based colours, piloting the Aqua-Driver Grand Vehicles.

==== Sazer Gorbion ====
Makoto Sorimachi (反町 誠, Sorimachi Makoto), born November 3, 1979, is Sazer-Gorbion the leader of the Water Tribe. His past as a war photographer made him grow cautious and mistrusting other tribes. Makoto makes his debut as a Sazer when Leviathan becomes endangered due to Radia's presence and motives and promptly saves Tarious from impending death. He refused to work in the big team for a while longer, and his generally high dedication to what he thinks is right is often, but not always, a blessing to the other Sazers.

With his Knuckle Riser, Makoto transforms into Sazer Gorbion (セイザーゴルビオン, Seizā Gorubion), the water warrior under the sign of Scorpio. His armour is shaped after a shark in royal blue. Sazer-Gorbion's main weapon is the Blast Saw, a serrated broadsword. Its finishing attack is called "Death Storm", which calls forth a small tsunami. Sazer-Gorbion's second attack is known as "Aqua Slasher".

==== Sazer Pisces ====
Ai Uozumi (魚住 愛, Uozumi Ai), born February 26, 1986, is a nurse working at the same hospital as Akira. Right after their first encounter, Ai fell in love with him. Later that day, she and her long-time friend Tappei were attacked by Lucia, and Ai had to transform to protect herself. Just in time, she was saved by Akira (Sazer-Remls). Eventually she found out that Professor Wakui, her biological father, was kidnapped by Logia.

With her Knuckle Riser, Ai transforms into Sazer Pisces (セイザーパイシーズ, Seizā Paishīzu), the water warrior under the sign of Pisces; her cyan armour is shaped after a whale. Sazer-Pisces' main weapon is the Aqua Blitz, a small gun. Its finishing attack is called "Blink Shot", which is a strong blast.

==== Sazer Gans ====
The last Sazer to be awakened, Tappei Mikami (三上 辰平, Mikami Tappei), born June 30, 1983, takes care of dolphins at an ocean theme park. His difficulty in transforming himself forced him to undergo training with Ryoko (Sazer-Velsou). The opportunity finally came, he managed to transform himself and join his tribe members, making the Water Tribe fully assembled.

With his Knuckle Riser, Tappei transforms into Sazer Gans (セイザーギャンズ, Seizā Gyanzu), the water warrior under the sign of Cancer, his sky blue armour is shaped after a manta ray. Sazer-Gans' main weapon is the Karnikos (Greek; Great Victor), a double blade halberd. Its finishing attack is called "Taikai Shousetsudan (Ocean Roar Cut)", which shoots a stream of water.

== Allies ==
=== Professor Ichiro Horiguchi ===
Professor Ichiro Horiguchi (堀口 一郎博士, Horiguchi Ichirō Hakase) is a space archaeologist who has become famous for his scientific studies. His analysis of some ancient crystals lead him to discovering the secret of the Gransazers, the Chou Seishin, and the Gransazer War. Many have sought this knowledge. His assistant, Mika, was awakened as Sazer Mithras. Her new partners, Ken and Tenma, were awakened as Gransazers later. He guides the Sazers by giving them information and leads.

=== Atsushi Misonogi ===
Although Atsushi Misonogi (御園木 篤司, Misonogi Atsushi) is a bureaucrat, he is also very mysterious benefactor to Dr. Horiguchi's Gransazer research. Eventually, Misonogi reveals himself to be head of the Department of National Defense, using Horiguchi to track down the Gransazers for his country's gain. After seeing the severity of the alien threat, however, Misonogi decides to support the Gransazers in any way he can.

=== Masaki Wakui ===
Masaki Wakui (和久井 正樹, Wakui Masaki) is Ai Uozumi's long lost father, who throughout Ai's childhood, he's only known by the name Dr. Bear (ドクター・ベア, Dokutā Bea). He led the team which repaired the Guntroller.

=== Souichiro Okita ===
Souichiro Okita (沖田 総一郎, Okita Sōichirō) leads the strike team which assists the Sazers during battle. He also commands the robot Yuuhi using a special head piece.

=== Jado ===
Jado (ジャド, Jado) belongs to the Stonian race of Planet Stone (ストーン, Sutōn), who were chosen by Warp Monarch to attack Earth using the Mad Stone, a bomb-like rock of plutonium that the Stonians left on Earth ages ago. Refusing to let Earth be destroyed, Jado went to Earth to obtain the Mad Stone, taking over the body of Takumi Kawashima (川島 巧, Kawashima Takumi), an old friend of Ryouko from her college who died on his way to Tokyo after returning from Africa. But as a result of being forced to keep his host alive, Jado is weakening to the point that he would eventually die. Once Ryouko gives him the Mad Stone, the Stonian assigned to destroy Earth attacked him to regain the Mad Stone. Soon after, Takumi regained control over his body long enough before he and Jado leave Earth with the Mad Stone, detonating it in deep space and instantly vaporized.

=== Freedo ===
Freedo (フリード, Furīdo) is an Intergalactic cop from Planet Ajante (アジャンテ, Ajante) sent to kill Kriminal for his partner's sake. Fatally wounded, Freedo entered the body of Jin's friend Shinji Nakao (中尾 真司, Nakao Shinji) to continue pursuit with Jin forced to partner with the alien to ensure Shinji's safety and help. Once Kriminal is dead, Freedo leaves Shinji's body and departs into the afterlife.

=== Luka ===
Being of Planet Marius (マリウス, Mariusu), with the power to give her lifeforce to others, Luka (ルカ, Ruka; 42–43) was sent to Earth by Belzeus to unknowingly unseal the Bosquito, summoning Gig Fighters to hold the monster off until Tarius arrives. After seeing that the Gransazers were nothing like the Bosquito and Tarious' resolve to protect the Earth, Luka questions her actions, and Tenma convinces her to leave Warp Monarch. However, in the end, Luka sacrifices herself to save Tenma's life.

== Warp Monarch ==
The Cosmic Alliance Warp Monarch (宇宙連合ウオフ・マナフ, Uchū Rengō Uofu Manafu) are an interstellar monarchy with various planets under them. The reason for Warp Monarch destroying the Earth's ancient civilization some 400 million ago was because of Bosquito running rampant on it. However, Belzeus, claiming that the humans are descended from the Bosquito, uses the Gransazers to encourage the Warp Monarch to finish the global genocide they started long ago.

=== Akelon ===
The Akelon (アケロン人, Akeron-jin) race were the first alien menace to battle the Gransazers, their abilities include stretching arms, super speed, and shooting blasts of lightning. But their greatest strength is the Crystal Lens, a technology that can either heal/revive an Akelon or turn it into a Akelon Nova-Beast (アケロン大星獣, Akeron Daiseijū).

==== Karin Saeki ====
An Akelon who impersonated the deceased physicist Karin Saeki (佐伯 カリン, Saeki Karin) (1-12, 46) upon her arrival on Earth, two decades ago, to survive within Earth's atmosphere. Acting as a guide to the Wind Tribe, she convinced them that the other Sazers were a threat to the planet and must be destroyed. Subtly, she built a relationship with Akira that ensured his loyalty to even further tie him to her. Once Ryouko and Jin leave her, Karin reveals her true Akelon identity to kill them until Tenma, Mika, and Gou arrives in time to fight her off. While overseeing Remls attacking his teammates, Karin fights Tarius until the Wind Tribe notice the explosion of their fight, with Akira seeing Karin for as she really is, revealing she fell in love with the human and offered to spare his life. But in spite of his own love for her, Remls is forced to kill her to save Tarious, knocking her off the building to her death.

However, she came to life before her body could be autopsied by the national defense group. Making her way to Ryujin Mountain, Karin summoned her UFO to heal her injuries before going after Sazer Tawlon and severely wounding him to call out the Gransazers. After being manhandled by the Fire Tribe, Karin assumes her Nova-Beast form and destroys the city, as Garuda and Dolcruz are summoned to fight her. Though she had the upper hand against the two Chouseishin, Karin retreats to the valley hill to heal her burn injuries by Garuda, taking Akira into the beast for one last chance to join her before she resumes her attack. After Remls breaks free from her body, the assembled Gransazers managed to destroy Karin's UFO before she herself is destroyed by the three Chouseishin.

==== Clo-Akelon ====
From the remains of Karin, Tsubaki of the JSDF science division begins to secretly mass-produce stronger Clo-Akelon (クローンアケロン人, Kurōn Akeron-jin) (28-29) that would serve as bio-weapons to ensure Japan would be a greater world power. Test Subject One was sent after Shiroi Kuga to reclaim the Crystal Lens when confronted by Tarius and was later destroyed. But once the Crystal Lens is back in Tsubaki's grasp, Test Subject Two turns on his creators upon being exposed to the Crystal Lens, stealing it while killing any soldier in his way of escape. But once losing the Crystal Lens, the Fire Tribe Gransazers arrive in time to drive the clone off with Tsubaki's platoon in pursuit. However, the Akelon Clone manages to reclaim the Crystal Lens and transforms into Clo-Akelon Nova-Beast (クローンアケロン大星獣, Kurōn Akeron Daiseijū) form. The monster was slowed down by Youhei, as it destroys the monster's crystal lens. The Chouseishin arrive, and Daisazer finishes the clone off.

==== Ruby ====
Though an agent of Warp Monarch, Ruby (ルビー, Rubī) (46-51) intended to stop Belzeus' scheme by heading to Earth to find Ran. Though thought as an enemy because of Karin's actions, Ruby reveals she's on the Gransazers' side when she saves Ran. Wounded while protecting Ran from Algol, Ruby is taken the JSDF. Once healed, she help Ran awaken as the Communicator to become the vessel of communication between Earth and the Warp Monarch high council.

=== The Impactors ===
After Karin's death, the Impactors (インパクター, Inpakutā) from Planet Impactor are entrusted with the mission to destroy Earth at all costs. The Impactors' culture is centered on honor and combat, using cards to switch between human form and fighting form. In the first part, Lucia and Radia were sent to use a meteor to wipe out Shinkujira Island, to destroy the final Chouseishin Leviathan before going after the other Chousishin. However, the meteor was hindered by Cloud Dragon and the fragments unearthed Leviathan instead. After the Water Tribe reveal themselves and awaken Levithan to kill Radia, Logia reveals himself. But after the plan with Guntras fails, the Impactors are ordered by the Warp Monarch to cease their attack on Earth.

==== Logia ====
Impactor Logia (インパクターロギア, Inpakutā Rogia) (16-51) is the lead commander of the Impactors, entrusted with the mission to destroy Earth at all costs, following his kind's code of honor, and armed with the Hiro-Sniper gun. Assuming the guise of Shuichi Hoshiyama (星山 秀一, Hoshiyama Shūichi), he posed as Wakui's assistant to get the Guntroller to use Guntras in his Solar Annilation, using the giant robot's oxygen supply to make the sun go supernova and kill everyone. But Lucia was wounded in episode 21, and Logia saved her as he has feelings for her as well. However, the Guntroller has fallen into the Gransazer's hand, the mission ends an absolute failure and ordered to fall back by his superior. However, Logia summons DaiLogian to Earth and use it to destroy the Gransazers once and for all for the sake of his fallen comrades, taking out Tawlon, Remls, before going after Gorbion in a plan to upset Tarious. But the Pisces and Gans' interference saved their leader as he decides to wait for the Flame Tribe for a match between Garuda and DaiLogia before the others arrive to form DaiSazer. But when defeated by Tarius, Logia turns himself into a suicide bomber to taking the Sazer with him as they leave Earth's orbit. However, Logia drops Tenma at the last second once realizing this action would go against his pride as an Impactor. The bomb however, went off and Logia went to Hell.

However, he survived his suicide and resurfaces upon regaining Dailogian and his Hiro-Sniper from the JDSF's Scientific Research Lab, beginning his vendetta against the Gransazers by kidnapping Ryouko and Ran and capturing Tappei, leaving them at the mercy of a time-bomb while he goes after Tarius to personally kill him. But when the plan goes array, Logia summons DaiLogian to crush Tarius as the Yuuhi arrives to hold him at bay under reinforcements arrive in the GranVehicles and drive him off. Logia later resumes his attack at the JD Weapon Institute to get Okito and Yuuhi under his control to hold Daisazer while weakened. But the plan fails and Logia goes to hell again after Dailogian is damaged by Daisazer, found by Belzeus who offers him another chance by increasing his power and reviving Logia in return for the Crystal Slab by taking Mika and Professor Horiguchi as hostages to force Tenma to hand deliver it to him alone.

Once he smashes the Crystal Slab, unaware that it's a fake, Logia fight Tenma to his heart's content until the other Gransazers arrive to free Mika as the Professor Horiguchi as they even the odds and force Logia to use DaiLogian to fight Daisazer until Belzeus is tired of Logia's arrogance, forcing him out of DaiLogian as it leaves under Belzeus control. Refusing to give up, Logia abducts Mika who tends to his wounds before he lets her go as he goes to hunt down the Belzeus-controlled DaiLogian and reclaim it as he and Tarious settle things in a one-on-one fist fight. But the fight ends in a draw as a satisfied Logia leaves, later returning to aid them in fighting Belzeus, though he still sees Tenma as an eternal rival. After that Logia realize that he was betrayed by Belzeus, he supports the rest of the Gransazers in their final battle before arresting Belzeus. At the end, and bids farewell to Tenma.

==== Lucia ====
Impactor Lucia (インパクタールシア, Inpakutā Rusia) (13-22), who came to earth along with Radia, is a swift and cunning fighter who assumes the form of a woman in her twenties with a red streak in her hair, wearing a green leotard and a cape. In her black-armored form, Lucia uses the V-Sword as both a boomerang and as a sword. She also loves Logia and would do anything for him. After Radia dies, Lucia swears to kill the Gransazers in spite of Logia ordering her not to act. She attacks Samura while he was tracking her, fighting Tenma and Gou. After getting scarred by Ai, Lucia attempts to get revenge on her, both Ran and Mika arrive to Ai's aid and defeat Lucia, mortally wounding her and taking her to the hospital in hopes of healing her. But as her body is beyond human medicine, Lucia would eventually die were it not for Logia saving her after she learns that he has feelings for her as well. After being healed, Lucia learns that she is no longer to continue the mission. However, going against the order, she use Accelerator to increase her power, turning into a giant version of herself in spite that that Accelerator's long-term effect would make her into a mindless monster and eventually kill her. Though she over-powered the Chouseishin with her cloaking and clone abilities before enlarging herself even more, Lucia is outmatched by Daisazer with its pilots stopping it in time before it kills her. However, Lucia succumbs to the Accelerator's effect as dies, leaving behind her card for Logia to find.

==== Radia ====
Impactor Radia (インパクターラディア, Inpakutā Radia) (13-15), who came to earth along with Lucia, is a hot-headed and fierce fighter who assumes the guise of a blond haired man in silvery attire. He has romantic feelings for Lucia, though having ill feelings towards Logia in spite of his forced-respect for him. In his silver-armored fighting form, Radia uses the enormous Mega Axe in his armor. He presented an interest in the Gransazers, deeming them too weak to stand a chance against him in one-on-one fights. But Gorbion's interference forces Radia to escape, swearing a vendetta on Gorbion since. But when Lucia is wounded, Radia decides to complete the mission on his own, fighting Gorbion and Pisces until he enlarges into a giant as Gans arrives and the gathered Water Tribe awaken Leviathan. But Radia's pride is his undoing when he refuses to retreat from the fight and is killed by Leviathan.

=== Bisil ===
The underhanded Bisilians (ビズル星人, Bizuru Seijin) (26-27) are sent to destroy Earth, sending an operative and a spy to test the first Stage in their dimensional transport system, using it to bring humans where they eventually disintegrate instantly. After the Gransazers learn of this plot, the Bisilians kill their operative before retreating to begin Stage Two. Once learning the location of the Dimensional Transport Machine, the others go to fight the Bisil Soldiers while Tarius activates the machine's self-destruct. Soon after, Garuda engages the Bisilian mothership in an aerial dogfight and destroys it.

==== Asami Yoshioka ====
A Bislian spy who assumed the guise of Asami Yoshioka (吉岡 麻美, Yoshioka Asami) (26-27), a girl who died a six months ago of illness. She was said to hinder the Gransazers. From being with Ken and befriending him, Ayumi realizes that Earth shouldn't be destroyed though she is force. After Ran, Asami apologizes for deceiving him and is mortally wounded by a Bizal Soldier for betraying her race, revealing the location of the Dimensional Transport system as she thanks Ken with her dying breath, reduced to wisps of light.

=== Omega ===
A Warp Monarch android created in the Omega Project, Omega (オメガ, Omega) (38-39) as anti-Gransazer weapon hidden within Earth after the battle eons ago in case the Gransazers resurface with a fail-safe built into him that would activate after seeing all twelve to self-destruct. Uncovered from a Croatian tomb and brought to the JSDF Weapons Institute, Omega whirled to life and when Mika touched him, having no memory of his past. He later began to explore Tokyo in search for Mika so she can help him gather data of the present-day society. By the time he meets Ran, Omega regains his memories of the past and is compelled to fight Mithras, unable to kill her. Confused, Omega decides to report to Warp Monarch, ordered to gather all the Gransazers after his AI is reprogramed without feeling and at full power. After getting the JSDF's secrets, Omega battles the Flame Tribe, Dail, Tragos, and Visuel before assuming a giant monster form to destroy Yuuhi. Mithras fights Omega in Garuda until the other Chousienshin are summon and Daisazer is formed and heavily damages Omega, restoring his AI as he apologizes to Mika and runs off as the entire Gransazer team runs to him as an act of redemption.

=== Garbans ===
From planet Garba, the Garbans (ガルバ星人, Garuba Seijin; 46–51) are the final alien menace the Gransazers battle with.

==== Belzeus ====
Belzeus (ベルゼウス, Beruzeusu) (40-51) is a member of the Warp Monarch council and leader of both the Garban and the Earth Invasion Force, the one who set up the war after making his fellow member believe the human race descend from the Bosquito race. In truth he wanted to take over Earth to gain a vital place in conquering the universe. To that end, he creates supports to his claim by having using Logia to destroy Crystal Slab to hide the truth and Luka to resurrect the last Bosquito to give Warp Monarch to attack Earth in full fury. When both failed, Belzeus decides to capture Ran and kill her before her abilities as the Communicator fully manifest, sending his Garba soldiers to exterminate both her and Ruby. Belzeus then arrives on Earth to personally kill Ran, defeating Pisces, Velsou, and Tragos. But when Ran's power as the Communication are finally invoked and contacted to Warp Monarch's will, Belzeus' plans are revealed as Warp Monarch allows the Gransazers to destroy both Cabryon and the Garban mothership. With his plans ruined, Belzeus is knocked out by Logia as he takes the Garban to be brought before the Warp Monarch council to face judgement.

==== Brighton ====
A Garban Emissary sent to Earth during a 3-day ceasefire, Brighton (ブライトン, Burigton) (46-48) fakes sympathy for Earth's safety by asking the JSDF to let him investigate the Gransazers, finding Ran as Communicator and claiming her to have Bosquito DNA so that he would give them reason to let him take her, thus leaving Earth with a Communicator to contact Warp Monarch. When ordered by Belzeus to kill Ran before her power can awaken, Brighton summons Algol to carry out the task. But when Algol fails, Brighton reveals his true colors as Troius sneak attacks the city. Later, while the others destroy Algol, Tarious goes after Brighton as the Garban pretends to beg for his life so he can kill Tarious with his guard down, only to be killed by Logia.

==== Algol ====
Serving under Brighton, Algol (アルゴウル, Arugōru) (46-48), is sent to kill Ran, though Ruby stops him when he overpowers Tarius and the Earth Tribe. After Brighton brings Ran to Algol, Tenma saves Ran as he battles Agol. When Ran finds Agol to have him kill her when Ruby interferes again as Tarious and Lion arrive to save the two. Algol later attacks the JSDF as the Gransazers arrive and kill him.

=== Gorgion ===
Sent by Belzeus to exterminate Ruby before she could awaken Ran's power, Gorgion (ゴーギャン, Gōgyan) (49-50) attacks the JSDF before being hindered in his mission by Dail, who manages to defeat before injuring Velsou. But Tarious arrives to hold him off with aid from Gorbion and Relms as Mithras takes Ryouko and Ruby away. However, Logia turns the tables as he and Tarius double-team Gorgion and the Impactor about to kill him when Tarious' intervened, allowing Gorgion to escape. He is given one last chance to redeem himself by using Cabryon as a distraction to keep the Gransazers off his back while he kills Ruby without interference. After finding Ruby, Gorgion is halted by the Flame Tribe. But after an attempt to use Mithras as a shield, activates the bomb on his person to complete his mission.

=== Gig Fighters ===
The foot soldiers of the Warp Monarch, the Gig Fighters (ギグファイター, Gigu Faitā) spawned from special devices often carried by its high-ranking members. They are often used to hassle the protagonists, or other duties such as supervise prisoners.

=== Other aliens ===
- Sturcus (ステュークス, Styūkusu) (25): From Planet Shuor (シュオール, Shuōru), he has the power to enter peoples' bodies. He attempted to use the body of professor Hijikata to have Horiguchi leave the Gransazers. But the failed and Sturcus decides to possess the professor and destroy the team from the inside-out, only retreat after being hit by the Gransazers' Formation Zero attack.
- Kilardoian (キラード星人, Kirādo Seijin) (31): A robotic alien from planet Kilardo, he assumes the form of a man in black and is sent to destroy the crystal recorder in the possession of Professor Aya Stacey, the eighteen-year-old Nobel-Prize winner. Once he succeeds, he tries to kill Aya and Gou when Tarious and Dail intervene before Tragos delivers the deathblow on the alien robot with Tarius finishing the Kilardoian off.
- Fedora (フェドラ, Fedōra) (32): The ghost of an alien soldier who died during Warp Monarch's war against Earth. Filled with undying rage towards humans and unaware that he died, Fedora possessed the body of Henry Wakasugi to continue the orders he received ages ago. It was once his identity is revealed, Tarious uses the crystal slab to make Fedora realized that he's dead, leaving Henry's body to finally rest.
- Gadaruian (ガダル星人, Gadaru Seijin) (35): An alien from planet Gadaru armed with the Dead Spear, he was a scientist sent by Warp Monarch to convert humans into mindless slaves, using Ran's friends as test specimens in his research. But Ran's friends are freed from the Gadaruian's control as Tarious battles the alien and kills him with Visuel's aid.
- Kriminel (クリミナル, Kurimuineru) (36): An alien felon with no relation to Warp Monarch, he escaped to Earth to feed on the energy there. Armed with a pistol he stole from Freedo's partner, Kriminel can absorb any heat-based energy source to heal himself and increase his power, firing stored energy from the orbs on his chest. After losing to Dail, Kriminel attracts the Fire Tribe's attention as Tenma and Mika fight him and worsen the matter. But once Dail breaks Kriminel's barrier, Freedo delivers the death-shot.
- Gorfinian (ゴルフィン星人, Gorufin Seijin) (37): A Warp Monarch agent from planet Gorfin, he enters the body of Mick the dolphin at the Sea Paradise aquarium to influence the other dolphins with his hyper frequency to attack humans with sound waves. But thanks to Mayu, Mick exorcises the Gorfinian as Gans fights before Tarious and Gorbion arrive and the dolphins use their own hyper frequency to weaken the alien as Gans finishes him off.
- Troius (トロイアス, Toroiasu) (47-48): A giant alien monster sent from the Fleet to attack the Earth once the ceasefire ended. Dolcruz and Leviathan battle the beast with aid of the GranVehicles and Yuuhi. But the fight ends with Dolcruz heavily damaged, Yuuhi dismantled, and Tappei wounded. After Garuda got damaged as well, Guntras and Cloud Dragon intervene and destroy Troius.
- Cabyron (キャブレオン, Kyabureon) (50-51): Arriving in a fireball, Cabryon is used by Gorgion to attack the JSDF to draw the Gransazers out into the open to complete his mission. Carbion succeeds in damaging Guntras to keep the Gransazers from forming DaiSazer and wrecks the other Chouseishin while appearing to kill Tenma. But once Warp Monarch acknowledges the truth about Earth, the Chouseishin are restored and form DaiSazer to kill Cabyron.

== Bosquito ==
The Bosquito (ボスキート, Bosukîto) (42-45) is an alien construct that absorbs any lifeform in its grasp, for nourishment, into order to reproduce asexually, and able to assimilate the energy of its clone spawn when they die. It is feared across the universe, as Warp Monarch couldn't control the Bosqutio when it came to Earth, resulting in the birth of the Gransazers to counter it and the War that destroyed ancient human civilization along with the propaganda set up to link the Bosquito to Earth's people. Though nearly wiped out, the Bosquito was sealed away, within the Kabuto Mountain, until Luka revived it on Belzeus' order, with no idea who she was reviving, until it was too late. Being able to use any attack used by the Gransazers, the Bosquito overpowers the Flame Tribe and later attacks a village, feeding on the people there, before using the TV to find ideal locations to feed on next. After evading the Wind Tribe, the Bosquito reproduces a child before fighting the Gransazers and is killed by them. The surviving child began to feed when Makoto and Jin arrive and were attacked as Tauron arrives to support them before the Bosquito multiplies itself as the Flame Tribe arrive to counter the second Bosquito until Yuuhi blasts it. Absorbing its clone, the Bosquito takes the controls for Yuuhi and uses it against the Gransazers, stealing Garuda when the Flame Tribe summons it. Levithan and Gunceasar are summoned to weaken Garuda so eject the Bosquito, who starts to absorb the floral life energy to regain its strength and create two clones of itself. After the others destroy the clones, the orbs they left behind are reabsorbed into the original Bosquito as it evolves into a giant monster. After Tarius uses one of Lion's Crescents to take the ruby on its chest, the source of its power, the Bosquito is destroyed by DaiSazer.

However, as revealed in the Seishin crossover (Chousei Kantai Sazer-X: The Movie), another Bosquito existed within the monster Bulgario, released when the monster was destroyed at sea, absorbing the JustiPower in Sazer Island, so it can duplicate itself and can disguise themselves as impostor Justirisers. They are all destroyed by Gransazers, Justirisers and Sazer-X but quickly absorbed into the phantom ship so that it would form into Mammoth-Bosquito dragon. The Mammoth-Bosquito is destroyed by Great-Lio (piloted by Lio-Sazer) using the final move, Howling Crush, which the power of Gransazers, Justirisers and Sazer-X combined into the finishing attack to destroy the monster.

== ChouSeiShin ==
The ChouSeiShin (Ultra Star Gods or Super Star Gods) are the most powerful weapons of the ancient Earth Civilization. They remained dormant on Earth until the GranSazers were awakened, and reactivated the long-lost relics.

Each Tribe possesses one of the four ChouSeiShin, which can be summoned by setting all of their Knuckle-Risers to "ChouSeiShin Mode". One member of the Tribe can then "Dive In" and board the machine by setting their Knuckle-Riser to "Boarding Mode". Furthermore, by setting their Knuckle-Riser to "Sazer Gear Mode" the pilot can equip their ChouSeiShin with a large version of their personal weapon.

Each ChouSeiShin has two modes, which can be switched between with a simple transformation. In "Live Mode", they resemble animals and possess incredible maneuverability. In Warrior Mode, they resemble bipedal mecha, losing most of their speed, but gaining immense attacking power.

=== ChouSeiShin Garuda ===
ChouSeiShin Garuda (超星神ガルーダ, Chōseishin Garūda) is the Flame Tribe's ChouSeiShin, the second to be awaken from its slumber in Hōō Mountain. In Live Mode, Garuda is shaped after a phoenix and attacks with his guns located under its wings where its legs are, firing lasers and energy beams. Garuda can also tackle enemies after engulfing himself in flames. In Warrior Mode, Garuda mostly relies on the 'Garu Claw', which are his talons on the back of his fists, for close-range combat. He performs his finishing move "Fire Bird Slash" with them. Garuda can also summon a sword called Burning Saber for armed melee combat. Tarious' Sazer Gear equips Garuda with a giant version of the Falcon Bow, and Lion's Sazer Gear equips Garuda with giant versions of the Double Crescents.

=== ChouSeiShin Dorcrus ===
ChouSeiShin Dorcrus (超星神ドルクルス, Chōseishin Dorukurusu) also known as Dorcrus or Dorcrus is the Wind Tribe's ChouSeiShin, the first to be awakened from its slumber in Kabuto Mountain. In Live Mode, Dorcrus is shaped after a European rhinoceros beetle and attacks with his multitude of cannons as well as with full tackles. In Warrior Mode, Dorcrus uses his large array of cannons and blasters to perform various attacks. His finishing move, "Herakles Hurricane", fires his entire arsenal of cannons and blasters simultaneously. Remls' Sazer Gear equips Dorcrus with a giant version of the Iron Gale on his head, since Dolcruz does not have proper hands to hold objects (in theory).

=== ChouSeiShin GunCaesar ===
ChouSeiShin GunCaesar (超星神ガンシーサー, Chōseishin Ganshīsā) is the Earth Tribe's ChouSeiShin, the third to be awaken from its slumber in the Shishioh Desert. In Live Mode, GunCaesar is shaped after a liger and attacks with his cannons as well as with his claws. In Warrior Mode, GunCaesar uses his cannons, the Liger Riots, as hand blasters. He performs his finishing move, "Gravity Burst", with them. Tawlon's Sazer Gear equips GunCaesar with a giant version of the Bull Cannon.

=== ChouSeiShin Leviathan ===
ChouSeiShin Leviathan (超星神リヴァイアサン, Chōseishin Rivaiasan) Whale is the Water Tribe's ChouSeiShin, the last to be awaken from its slumber in Shinkujira Island Water when the Impactors arrive on Earth. In Live Mode, Leviathan has a whale-like shape and uses his fins for ramming attacks, as well as firing his two cannons at the fins. In Warrior Mode, Leviathan is armed with the Maelstrom Blades which can be used for his finishing move "High Tide Break". Furthermore, he is equipped with the Ocean Shield which can be used for his another move "Mirage Shield" which can multiply for defence purposes. Gorbion's Sazer Gear equips Leviathan with a giant version of the Blast Saw.

=== ChouSeiShin Guntras ===
ChouSeiShin Guntras (超星神ガントラス, Chōseishin Gantorasu) is controlled by an advanced AI, superior to the other ChouSeiShin to have a will of his own. Initially hidden away in the Andes, referred as the "Great Shadow" in Peruvian legend, Guntras resurfaced when his Guntroller is repaired and Logia controls him, planning to use Guntras' oxygen fuel supply to collide with the Sun and trigger a nova strong enough to evaporate Earth, after killing the GranSazers first. Tenma eventually got the Guntroller and freed Guntras, who joined up with Cloud Dragon as an ally to the Sazers. Later Guntras is revealed to be created to combine the four ChouSeiShin into one giant super robot (DaiSazer). Guntras is armed with an array of deadly weapons, among them a laser battery on his chest, a cannon on his forehead and missile launchers on his body. He can fire and immediately replace his fists in his Twin Crusher attack, and his powerful feet can create devastating shockwaves in his Land Shake attack.

=== Fusion Beast-King DaiSazer ===
Fusion Beast-King DaiSazer (合神獣王ダイセイザー, Gasshinjūō Daiseizā) Dragon/Megalosaurus is the assembled form of the four Tribes' ChouSeishin, along with ChouSeishin Guntras. Guntras forms the main body, head and feet; Garuda for chest, cranium, and back; Dorcrus for the legs; GunCaesar for the right arm and the shoulder cannons; and Leviathan for the left arm and the tail. Combined, DaiSazer has a very aggressive and archaic mind of its own. All four pilots have to focus to control DaiSazer. DaiSazer is a very deadly creature and it is armed with a deflector as well as a laser array on its chest, but DaiSazer mostly relies on brute force to deal with its opponents.

Its attacks include: 'Rapid Sazer', which fires the shoulder cannons on its back; 'Blast Pressure', unleashing a blast of fire from Guncaesar's mouth on its right arm; 'God Sphere', firing energy beams from its eyes. Its finishing move is 'Hyper Burst', which unleashes the full power of Guntras and the 4 ChouSeiShin combined through the laser array on its chest.

=== ChouSeiJuuren Cloud Dragon ===
ChouSeiJuuren Cloud Dragon (超星獣連クラウドドラゴン, Chôseijûren Kuraudo Doragon), translated into English as Ultra Star Beast Carrier Cloud Dragon, is as old as the ChouSeiShin, another remnant of the ancient civilization and residing within the ozone layer of the Earth to protect it from alien invaders, implanted with a DNA of humanity to start back up the human race and an AI modeled after a woman from ancient civilization. She only descends from the ozone layer if the ChouSeiShin are summoned or are in need of her help for repairs. The Cloud Dragon is designed for combat support and repairs the ChouSeishin after they suffered battle damage and rendered immobile as a result, in which a sky whirlpool is created to collect the damaged ChouSeiShin and loads them onto one of the 4 storage pads (for the ChouSeiShin of each Tribe in the order of Flame (Garuda), Wind (Dorcrus), Earth (GunCaesar) and Water (Leviathan) respectively) on its body for repairs and restoration in outer space (the first such repairs is done onto the Flame ChouSeiShin Garuda by restoring its damaged left wing), upon which they can be launched straight from the colossal Dragon's storage pads once fully repaired and when the Gransazers summon them. Prior to the final battle, Cloud Dragon formally introduces herself to the GranSazers before telling them they have the answer to stop the attack on Earth. The Cloud Dragon's attack is the Galactica Prominence Cannon, a devastating blaster capable of blowing an entire asteroid into pieces. Inside cloud dragon there are GranVehicle which is one for each tribe's member. GranVehicle of flame tribe is flame driver, wind tribe's vehicle is wind driver, earth tribe's is earth driver, and the water tribe's is aqua driver, which is one for each gransazer. With gransazers knuckle riser there is GranVehicle mode. The Sazers who dives in they on's their GranVehicle mode and says GranVehicle launch and dives in. on the cloud dragon the place where these GranVehicles launch is where Guntras stands in front is place where GranVehicles launch which is one for everyone. Cloud Dragon's Zodiac sign is unofficial 13th sign, Ophiuchus.

== Other mecha ==
=== DaiLogian ===
Dailogian is Logia's personal mecha. It is a black humanoid robot patterned after a wolf and its power is almost equal to Daisazer's. Unlike his subordinates, Lucia and Radia, Logia cannot grow into a giant; instead, he summons his mecha, which is always on standby in outer space, and which Logia alone can summon. It can absorb beam attacks through its chest and redirect them back to the opponents. It first fought with Daisazer and was defeated when Daisazer ripped off its arm. The second time was when Logia and Tenma fought one on one in their respective mechas with Tenma barely securing the victory. After DaiLogian was defeated, it was taken by the Japan Self-Defense Force for study. It reactivated, then busted out of the Japan Self-Defense Force holding area, when Logia returned to Earth to seek vengeance against the Sazers. Afterwards, Logia used it as a mode of transport.

=== Yuuhi ===
The Type-05 GS Assist Robot Yuuhi (五式支援機士ユウヒ, Goshiki Shienkishi Yûhi) (28-48)was the result of the JSDF reverse engineering DaiLogian so they can support the Gransazers' Chouseishin. Remote controlled by a voice-command headgear, the Yuuhi is launched from an underground bunker. It can access numerous weapons, a 120-mm dual cannon as well as two arrays of six missile launchers each. Prior to the final battle, Yuuhi was broken into pieces after fighting Troius.

=== Type-05 GS Assist Tank "Asahi" ===
Asahi is Yuuhi's support mecha. It vaguely resembles an M4 Sherman.

== Episodes ==
1. Awaken! The Warrior of the Stars (目覚めよ!星の戦士, Mezame yo! Hoshi no Senshi)
2. Activate! Dolcruz (発動!ドルクルス, Hatsudō! Dorukurusu)
3. Assemble! The Flame Tribe (結成!炎のトライブ, Kessei! Honō no Toraibu)
4. Death! The Warrior of the Earth (死闘!大地の戦士, Shitō! Daichi no Senshi)
5. Burn! The Policeman's Soul (燃えろ!警官魂, Moero! Keikan Tamashii)
6. Clash! Wind, Fire and Earth (激突!風と炎と大地, Gekitotsu! Kaze to Honō to Daichi)
7. Run! To Save a Life (走れ!命を救うため, Hashire! Inochi o Sukū Tame)
8. Descent! The Heavenly Dragon (降臨!天空の龍, Kōrin! Tenkū no Ryū)
9. Tremble With Fear! Karin's True Form (戦慄!かりんの正体, Senritsu! Karin no Shōtai)
10. Invasion! Akelon's Trap (侵略!アケロンの罠, Shinryaku! Akeron no Wana)
11. All Together! The 9 Sazers (結集!9人のセイザー, Kesshū! Kyūnin no Seizā)
12. climactic battle! The Ultra Star Gods VS the Giant Star Beast (決戦!超星神対大星獣, Kessen! Chōseishin tai Daiseijū)
13. Attack! The Impactors (襲撃!インパクター, Shūgeki! Inpakutā)
14. Awaken! The Water Warriors (覚醒せよ!水の戦士, Kakusei seyo! Mizu no Senshi)
15. Rise! The Ultra Star God of the Water (伊達!水の超星神, Date! Mizu no Chōseishin)
16. Emergency! Commander Logia (非常!司令官ロギア, Hijō! Shireikan Rogia)
17. Crisis! The Mankind Extermination Plan (危機!人類抹殺計画, Kiki! Jinrui Massatsu Keikaku)
18. The Strongest Enemy! Guntras (最強の敵!ガントラス, Saikyō no Teki! Gantorasu)
19. Sortie! Guncesar (出撃!ガンシーサー, Shutsugeki! Ganshīsā)
20. Fierce Fighting! Battle Ladies (激闘!バトルレディ, Gekitō! Battoru Redi)
21. It's Coming! Earth's Final Day (迫る!地球最後の日, Semaru! Chikyū Saigo no Hi)
22. Look! The Combined Ultra Star God (見よう!合体超星神, Miyō! Gattai Chōseishin)
23. Revenge! Logia's Challenge (復讐!ロギアの挑戦, Fukushū! Rogia no Chōsen)
24. Menace! Dailogian (脅威!ダイロギアン, Kyōi! Dairogian)
25. Secret Maneuver! A New Enemy (暗躍!新たなる敵, Anyaku! Aratanaru Teki)
26. Different Dimension Prisoners (異次元の囚人, Ijigen no Shūjin)
27. Get Mad! The Flaming Certain-Death Swords (怒れ!炎の必殺剣, Okore! Honō no Hissatsu Ken!)
28. The Beautiful Fugitive (美しき逃亡者, Utsukushiki Tōbōsha)
29. Mobilize! Type-05 GS Assist Robot (出動!五式支援機, Shutsudō! Goshiki Shienkishi)
30. Velsou Out Of Control! (ヴェルソー,暴走!, Verusō, Bōsō!)
31. The Pompous Princess Indanger! (王女様,危機一髪!, Ojō-sama, Kiki Ippatsu!)
32. The Nightmare on the Spaceship (宇宙飛行士の悪夢, Uchū Hikōshi no Akumu)
33. The Vengeful Demon, Logia Again (復讐の鬼,ロギア再び, Fukushū no Oni, Rogia Futatabi)
34. Defeat, Dailogian! (倒せ,ダイロギアン, Taose, Dairogian!)
35. Dancing Dream (ダンシングドリーム, Danshingu Dorīmu)
36. Farewell Partner! (然らば相棒!, Saraba Aibō!)
37. The Dolphins' Day (海豚の日, Iruka no Hi)
38. The Visitor from Ancient Times (迢古代からの来訪者, Chōkodai kara no Raihōsha)
39. Project Omega (プロジェクトオメガ, Purojekuto Omega)
40. Revenge! Jet Black Soldier (逆襲!漆黒の戦士, Gyakushū! Shikkoku no Senshi)
41. Showdown! (対決, Taiketsu!)
42. Rebirth! The Ancient Life (甦得る!古代生命, Yomigae Eru! Kodai Seimei)
43. Bosquito The Destroyer (絶滅者ボスキート, Zetsumetsusha Bosukīto)
44. Unraveled! The Enigmatic Ancient War (解明!迢古代戦争の謎, Kaimei! Chōkodai Sensō no Nazo)
45. Bosquito's Final Battle (ボスキート最終決戦, Bosukīto Saishū Kessen)
46. The Beginning of the End (終末の始まり, Shūmatsu no Hajimari)
47. The Destruction's Prelude (滅亡の序曲, Metsubō no Jokyoku)
48. The Dragon's Memory, The Sacred Purpose (龍の記憶,天の意志, Ryū no Kioku, Ten no Ishi)
49. The Cosmic Alliance Army Begins Its Advance! (宇宙連合軍進撃開始!, Uchūrengōgun Shingeki Kaishi!)
50. Tenma Dies! (天馬、死す!, Tenma, Shisu!)
51. The Day of Resurrection (復活の日, Fukkatsu no Hi)

=== TV special and film ===
- Chouseishin Gransazer: Super Battle Memory
- Gransazer Official Super Mecha DVD Battle! Super Star God's Decisive Battle in Tokyo
- Chousei Kantai Sazer-X the Movie: Fight! Star Warriors (Gekijōban Chōsei Kantai Sazer X: Tatakae! Hoshi no Senshitachi) (a Seishin team-up with the Justirisers and the Sazer-X)

== Songs ==
Opening theme

- "Life Goes On"
  - Lyrics: U-ya Asaoka
  - Composition: Eddy Blues
  - Arrangement: Kōichi Sawazaki
  - Artist: U-ya Asaoka (Field of View)
  - Label: Tokuma Japan Communications Co., Ltd.

Ending theme

- "Kimi o Tsureteiku" (きみをつれていく; "You Bring Along")
  - Lyrics: 326 (Mitsuru Nakamura)
  - Composition: Kyōhei Tsutsumi
  - Arrangement: Yoshimasa Inoue
  - Artist: Asami Abe
  - Label: Universal Music KK

== Cast ==
Gransazer Main Leader

- Tenma Kudou / Sazer Tarious: Ryou Segawa

Flame Tribes (Garuda)

Leader

- Tenma Kudou / Sazer Tarious: Ryou Segawa

Members

- Mika Shidou / Sazer Mithras: Asuka Shimizu
- Ken Shidou / Sazer Lion: Kohei Takeda

Wind Tribes (Dorhtus)

Leader

- Akira Dentsuin/Sazer Remls: Hideaki Serizawa

Members

- Ryoko Amemiya/Sazer Velsou: Maya Hoshino
- Jin Hakariya/Sazer Dail: Ren Matsuzawa

Earth Tribes (Gun Caesar)

Leader

- Naoto Matsuzaka/Sazer Tawlon: Tomohide Takahara

Members

- Ran Saotome/Sazer Visuel: Sayaka Isoyama
- Go Kamiya/Sazer Tragos: Soji Masaki

Water Tribes (Leviathan)

Leader

- Makoto Sorimachi/Sazer Gorbion: Hideki Okada

Members

- Ai Uozumi/Sazer Pisces: Kumiko Ito
- Tappei Mikami/Sazer Gans: Takuma Sugawara

Allies

- Ichiro Horiguchi: Shoichiro Akaboshi
- Atsushi Misonogi: Shunsaku Kudō
- Soichiro Okita: Tomonori Yoshida

Villains

- Karin Saeki: Mika Chiba
- Impactor Logia: Shinnosuke Abe
- Impactor Lucia: Chisun
- Impactor Radia: Ryuji Takaoka

=== Guest stars ===
Allies or Villains are in each Episodes storyline event

- Junya Akaki (5–6): Gyo Miyamoto
- Officer Narumi (5–6): Kota Harukaze
- Professor Chujo (9): Hiroshi Koizumi
- Masaki Wakui (14–18): Masayuki Yui
- Detective Samura (16): Tom Saeba
- Ai's Mother: Momoko Haruna
- Kenta Sakaki (19): Seigo Kuwabara
- Professor Satoko Hijitaka (25): Shoko Ikeda
- Asami Yoshoka (26–27): Asari
- Seiji Tsubaki (28–29): Shota Yamaguchi
- Shiori Kuga (28–29): Satoko Takemoto
- Kojiro Kanuma/Ramon (30): Hiroshi Izawa
- Takumi Kawashima/Jado (30): Ryo Koseki
- Aya Stacy (31): Kumi Imura
- Lisa Wakasugi (32): Chika Kumagai
- Henry Wakasugi/Fedora (32): Houka Kinoshita
- Yuji Kaga (33–34, 51): Kentaro Nakamura
- Shinji Nakao/Freedo (36): Hirofumi Taga
- Mayu (37): Yu Shinzaki
- Omega (38–39): Haruhiko Sato
- Luka (42–43): Eri Otoguro
- Brighton (46–48): Taichi Kuwabara
- Ruby (46–51): Marie Sada

=== Voice actors ===
Villains voice

- Belzeus: Takashi Taniguchi
- Algol/Gorfinian: Ryuta Izumi
- Impactor's Superior: Tadashi Wakabayashi
- Bosquito/Kriminel: Sei Haga
- Gorgion: Hitoshi Yamano
- Kiladorian: Shuya Yoshimoto
- Gadaruian: Masaya Kato

Allies voice

- Freedo: Mark Okita
- Cloud Dragon: Marie Sada
- Narration: Soichro Tanaka (ep. 1), Yu Motomura (eps. 2–34), Daisuke Kiri (eps. 35–51)

=== Stunts ===
- Sazer Tarious: Hiromi Shinjo
- Sazer Mithras: Misako Nagashima
- Sazer Lion/Impactor Radia/Youhi: Koji Shirahama
- Sazer Remls/Impactor Logia: Wataru Fukuda
- Sazer Velsou/Impactor Lucia: Emiko Saito
- Sazer Dail: Yuji Kitahara
- Sazer Tawlon/Belzeus: Daisuke Terai
- Sazer Visuel/Akelon: Sakiko Akiyoshi
- Sazer Tragos: Kazuhiko Tai
- Sazer Gorbion: Hiyoyuki Matsusue
- Sazer Pisces: Ami Sakai
- Sazer Gans: Hideyoshi Iwata
- Garuda/DaiSazer: Koichi Tsunoda
- Dolcross: Naoki Ogura, Seisuke Ida
- GunCaesar: Koji Shirayama, Kyoichi Shiga
- Leviathan: Kyoichi Shiga
- Guntras/Dai Logian: Nobuhiko Tanabe
- Cabryon/Kyodai Teki: Shinya Iwasaki
- Monster Akelon: Tomohiro Nagata
- Bosquito: Hiromi Shinjo, Kazuhiko Tai

Preceded by N/A	Chouseishin Series; 2003–2004	Succeeded by Genseishin Justirisers
