= Renji Abarai =

Fictional character from Bleach

- Bleach character
- Renji Abarai as depicted on the cover for Volume 11
- First appearance: Bleach chapter 51: "DEATH 3" (2002)
- Created by: Tite Kubo
- Portrayed by: Taichi Saotome
- Voiced by: Japanese; Kentarō Itō; Reiko Kiuchi (kid); English; Wally Wingert; Yuri Lowenthal (kid); Richard Cansino (live-action film)

In-universe information
- Species: Soul Reaper
- Spouse: Rukia Kuchiki (wife)
- Children: Ichika Abarai (daughter)
- Relatives: Hisana Kuchiki (sister-in-law, deceased); Byakuya Kuchiki (brother-in-law); Soujun Kuchiki (adoptive father-in-law, deceased); Unnamed adoptive mother-in-law (deceased)

Renji Abarai (Japanese: 阿散井 恋次, Hepburn: Abarai Renji) is a fictional character in the Japanese anime and manga series Bleach created by Tite Kubo. In the series, he initially challenges Ichigo Kurosaki, the protagonist of the series, but he later joins forces with him to help rescue Rukia Kuchiki halfway through the Soul Society arc. He has since become a major character and one of Ichigo's main allies. His weapon is Zabimaru.

== Appearances ==
=== Manga and anime ===
Renji and his captain, Byakuya Kuchiki, are sent to the human world to send Rukia Kuchiki back to the Soul Society. Before they can do so, Ichigo Kurosaki arrives to save Rukia. Renji and Ichigo briefly fight, Ichigo easily gains the upper hand after a sudden release of reiatsu, which was actually random bursts of resolve. Byakuya steps in and easily defeats Ichigo. After they return to the Soul Society and Rukia is imprisoned, Renji periodically checks up on her, trying to keep her spirits high despite her impending execution. It is revealed that Renji is a childhood friend of Rukia's. Their relationship was strained by Rukia's adoption into the Kuchiki family and Renji had striven to prove himself as a shinigami in order to match Rukia's new social standing and to be acknowledged by Rukia's adoptive brother, Byakuya.

Ichigo arrives at the Soul Society to find Rukia. Renji, feeling Ichigo is to blame for Rukia's sentence, goes to fight him. Despite his best efforts, Renji is defeated and subsequently imprisoned for his failure. Before Ichigo leaves, Renji pleads for Ichigo to save Rukia. Once he recovers, Renji escapes from his confinement and begins training to achieve bankai of his zanpakutō. After completing his training, Renji sets out to free Rukia. Before he can do so, however, he is stopped by Byakuya. The two clash with their respective bankai. Byakuya's mastery of bankai and Renji's inexperience result in Byakuya's victory. Following this battle, Renji goes to the site of Rukia's execution in a last attempt to save her despite his extensive injuries. Ichigo, having beaten him there, entrusts Rukia's safety to Renji and the two try to escape. Along the way they are met by Kaname Tōsen, who teleports them back to the execution site. Upon learning that Tōsen and Sousuke Aizen are traitors intending to kill Rukia, Renji fights to defend her, but is overwhelmed by Aizen. Rukia is ultimately saved by Byakuya, though Aizen leaves the Soul Society.

As Aizen's arrancars begin to threaten the human world, Renji is one of a group of Soul Reapers sent to help defend against the arrancar attacks. During the second arrancar invasion, Renji fights against Ilfort Grantz, whom he manages to defeat once his power limit is lifted. After the battle, Renji is recruited by Kisuke Urahara to help train Yasutora Sado. When Aizen kidnaps Orihime Inoue, the other Soul Reapers return to the Soul Society. Renji, Rukia, Ichigo, Chad and Uryū Ishida go to Hueco Mundo. After the group splits up, Renji is joined by Dondochakka Bilstin while traveling through the arrancar base Las Noches. They eventually encounter the Octava Espada, Szayel Aporro Grantz. Upon being drawn into battle with the Espada, Renji discovers that Szayelaporro has nullified all of his abilities as a result of Szayelaporro's earlier research. Uryū soon arrives to lend assistance, though his attacks are also rendered inert by Szayelaporro. No longer able to attack, Renji and Uryū are left at Szayelaporro's mercy until Mayuri Kurotsuchi arrives to save and heal them. He, Rukia, and Chad, are then attacked by a furious Yammy, who is revealed as the strongest of the Espada.

Seventeen months after Aizen's defeat, Renji heads to Karakura with many other high level shinigami, observing the restoration of Ichigo shinigami abilities and his battle with Kugo Ginjo. Renji meets the Fullbringer Jackie Tristan in combat, and easily defeats her, revealing that he had trained the same time is too powerful enough to fight Aizen.

After attending Sasakibe's funeral with Byakuya, the two face off against Stern Ritter F, Äs Nödt, after the Wandenreich invade the Soul Society. Byakuya's bankai is stolen and is used by Äs Nödt which almost kills him. Renji attempts to avenge Byakuya by activating his own bankai, but is blindsided by a kick from another Stern Ritter and is knocked across the Seireitei. After the invasion, Shinji Hirako heals both Renji and Rukia and are taken along with Ichigo and a still-breathing Byakuya to the Royal Palace by the Royal Guard. Upon being healed by Tenjiro Kirinji's healing techniques, Renji regains consciousness and accompanies Ichigo (and Kon) to the next palace. After finishing his training with the Royal Guard (and perfecting his Bankai), Renji and Rukia return to the Soul Society, and arrive just after Sternritter "S", Mask de Masculine, has killed several Captains and Lieutenants. Renji fights him and defeats him by using his perfected Bankai for the first time. After Ichigo defeats Yhwach, Renji and Rukia had a daughter, Ichika.

== Zabimaru ==
Hihiō Zabimaru.

Renji's Zanpaktou is Zabimaru (蛇尾丸, Zabimaru; lit "snake tail"), whose spirit form is normally a Nue. In Released form, Zabimaru's blades are attached on bellows-can be used as a sword when all attached, stretch and cut, or scatter all blades as a finisher. For most of the series, Renji's Bankai was believed to be Hihiō Zabimaru (狒々王 蛇尾丸; lit. 'Baboon King Snake Tail'), the blade turned into a giant skeletal snake that fires beams while its owner dons a baboon pelt. But the weapon's form is revealed to be an imperfect bankai as Renji later reveals his weapon's true bankai: Sōō Zabimaru (双王蛇尾丸; lit. 'Twin King Snake Tail'). Compared to Hihiō Zabimaru, Sōō Zabimaru is more practical as Renji gains use of his arm-like weapon Hihiō (狒々王; lit. 'Baboon King') while his blade becomes the hand-mounted "Orochiō" (Serpent King).

== In other media ==
Renji appears outside of the Bleach anime and manga. He fights the Dark Ones with various Soul Reaper in Bleach: Memories of Nobody and help in the search for Tōshirō Hitsugaya in Bleach: The DiamondDust Rebellion. In Bleach: Fade to Black Renji and other Soul Reapers lose their memories of Rukia and Ichigo, and ends confronting them later. He appeared in Bleach: Hell Verse. He is also present in the original video animations The Sealed Sword Frenzy combating the rogue Soul Reaper Baishin. In the Bleach video games, Renji is a playable character in most games with shikai and bankai states.

== Reception ==
Renji has ranked relatively high in the Shōnen Jump popularity votes, once ranking 4th place. IGN called Renji's debut into the anime "stylish and cool" and added that the short battle between Ichigo and Renji was "nicely done," noting that from the moment he was introduced, his style and weapon made him a character "[they] want to see more of." They later added in another review about Renji's change in character saying: "...It's nice to see a nicer Renji compared to the jerkish character we were introduced to. Renji's determination to save Rukia is admirable; really makes him a much more likeable character..." By the end of the Soul Society arc, Renji was "still cocky, but we've at least gotten to see that he has weaknesses just like everyone else," having "totally changed since he attacked Ichigo in the very first season." Animeondvd.com also praised Renji's development in the story praising Tite Kubo's way of telling his background making the readers change their ideas of the character. Wally Wingert, Renji's English voice actor, has found Renji to be the "coolest" part of the series he ever had, having liked his design and skills. He also liked his development in the series, such as his friendship with Rukia.
