= List of Hollows in Bleach =

Group of fictional characters

In the fictional Bleach manga/anime universe, a Hollow (虚(ホロウ), Horō) is a type of monstrous lost soul who can harm both ghosts and humans. Many of the series' antagonists are hollows. Some hollows possess characteristics that are similar to those of a Soul Reaper (a death-related entity), these Hollows are called Arrancars (破面(アランカル), Arankaru; from Spanish arrancar "to tear off," kanji translates as "broken mask") . One of the series' main storylines has Sousuke Aizen (the primary antagonist for the majority of the series) and his arrancar (particularly the ten strongest Espadas) as the force opposing the protagonists.

The creator of the series, Tite Kubo, used many Spanish motifs for the series' hollow-related elements. The fictional creatures have been praised by reviewers for the early hollows' strong emotional ties to their victims and the "interesting" concept of the arrancar. The visual appearance of the characters has also been commented on.

== Overview of hollow ==
The Hollow "Shrieker", as portrayed by anime character designer Masashi Kudō. Note the hole through the torso and the masked face, the two invariant traits of hollow character design.

In the Bleach universe, a hollow is a monstrous soul-eating spirit that results when a deceased soul is consumed by negative emotions or is forcibly converted by other hollows. All hollows have masks attached to their faces and a hollow hole somewhere on their bodies; they also have a tendency to attack those who were close to them in their human lives, which they superficially have no recollection of. Hollows possess individual reishi and intensify it through devouring any soul they come across. The 2018 film elaborates that the hollows had played a role in the concepts of the mythological creatures like Yokai.

An arrancar is a hollow which has gained Soul Reaper-like characteristics through the removal of its mask, thus resulting in an increased combat versatility and more humanoid appearance. The transformation of a hollow into an arrancar can occur either naturally or artificially, but there is little information on process that occurs. The arrancar affiliated with Aizen wear distinctive white uniforms. They retain the Mexican aesthetic borne by hollows, and according to Tite Kubo, many of them are named after real life architects and designers. The arrancars (except the ten Espadas) are given individual numbers which are based on the order of their birth (starting at the number 11); most arrancars are labeled as part of the Números (数字持ち(ヌメロス), Numerosu; Spanish for "Numbers", Japanese translates as "Number Holders").

Soul Reapers, including protagonist Ichigo Kurosaki, have two primary duties: Purify any hollows they encounter to protect other souls from being devoured, and perform the soul burial (魂葬(こんそう), konsō) ritual to lay ghosts to rest before they become hollows. When either of these duties is fulfilled, the soul goes to the Soul Society to live as an ordinary human until eventually reincarnated back to earth. But a hollow who committed grave sins in life is dragged into Hell for punishment. Hollow intrusions into Ichigo's hometown are the driving plot force for Bleach's first arc, at the end of which Ichigo leaves earth for Soul Society in order to rescue one of his friends.

Arrancar are introduced into Bleach following Ichigo's return from Soul Society, serving as major antagonists until their collective defeat in the Fake Karakura Arc. Most of the arrancar antagonists served Sousuke Aizen, who used an item called the hōgyoku to artificially create more arrancar. While more conscious than their original hollow selves, some arrancars are either sadistic psychopaths or display honor or compassion which resulted in some befriending the heroes. The arrancar are first shown scouting Ichigo's hometown by ones and twos, which escalates into sorties, and eventually a battle on earth and in Hueco Mundo between the most powerful arrancar and Soul Reapers. Following Aizen's defeat, the arrancar survivors attempted to become their society before they conquered by the Quincy extremists known as the Wandenreich, with those captured either drafted as expandable foot soldiers or executed as monsters.

The Hollows and arrancar inhabit a dimension called Hueco Mundo (虚圏(ウェコムンド), Weko Mundo; Spanish for "Hollow World," kanji translates as "Hollow Domain"), a vast barren desert with quartz "trees" which any hollow can access, leave and return to by tearing a hole in space called a Garganta. While in Hueco Mundo, most hollows can sate their hunger simply by breathing the reishi-rich air, and are threatened only by other hollows who have turned to cannibalism, conquest for power and sport, or both. Hueco Mundo is initially portrayed as impossible to access by non-hollows, but techniques for traveling there are eventually revealed, and Hueco Mundo was entered by outsiders, first by protagonist Ichigo Kurosaki and his allies, then later by Quincy conquerors. An enormous white domed palace called Las Noches (虚夜宮(ラス・ノーチェス), Rasu Nōchesu; Spanish for "The Nights," kanji translates as "Hollow Night Palace") in Hueco Mundo, initially ruins, was used by Aizen to garrison his troops.

== Powers and abilities of hollows ==
Like all spirit beings, hollows are invisible to humans with no reishi. All hollows can use their reishi to increase their strength, speed, and regeneration. Furthermore, some hollows have evolved their own unique capabilities, which are all fueled by their reishi.

Hollows become stronger by eating other souls with the most successful who avoid being slain able to eventually evolve into formidable foes known as Menos (メノス, Menosu; Spanish for "minus") which are classified and divided into three succeeding stages. The first stage, the Gillian (最下大虚(ギリアン), Girian; kanji translates as "Least of the Great Hollows") also called Menos Grandes (大虚(メノスグランデ), Menosu Gurande; Spanish for "less big/not as big", kanji translates as "Great Hollow"), are the result of numerous hollows engaging in a cannibalistic feeding frenzy that merges them into mindless black conglomerate giants, regarded as foot soldiers by Soul Reapers. But a Gillian will sometimes develop a personality from one of the component Hollows, causing it to eventually shrink into the animalistic Adjuchas (中級大虚(アジューカス), Ajūkasu; kanji translates as "Intermediate Great Hollow"). An Adjuchas is normally compelled to feed on other hollows to prevent it from regressing back to a Gillian, though losing a chunk of itself to another Adjuchas would allow it to permanently remain in its form. The Adjuchas that succeed become the semi-humanoid Vasto Lorde (最上大虚(ヴァストローデ), Vasuto Rōde; kanji translates as "Great King of the Hollows"), whose numbers are very few. While the first two stages demand the involvement of stronger Soul Reaper officers to dispatch them, Vasto Lordes pose an existential threat to the entire Soul Society. All Menos are capable of using Cero (虚閃(セロ), Sero; Spanish for "Zero", kanji translates as "Hollow Flash", sometimes called "Doom Blast" in the Viz manga), a powerful blast of spirit energy depicted as a sphere or beam of colored light.

Arrancar possess many of the abilities of their original hollows selves, with the Menos-based arrancar possessing their own unique cero variations. The abilities arrancar have include: sonido (響転(ソニード), sonīdo; Spanish for "sound," kanji translates as "moving sound"), which momentarily boosts their speed, bala (虚弾(バラ), bara; Spanish for "bullet", kanji translates as "hollow bullet") a glowing colored projectile made of solidified reiatsu that is described as being weaker than cero but is twenty times faster, and hierro (鋼皮(イエロ), iero; Spanish for "iron," kanji translates as "steel skin") a defensive technique which hardens their skin to the point that they can catch blades bare-handed. While possessing their zanpakutō (斬魄刀; lit. "soul-cutting sword") like Soul Reapers, arrancar zanpakutōs are meant to contain their full power with some manifesting in other forms besides swords. When an arrancar uses Resurrección (帰刃(レスレクシオン), Resurekushion; Spanish for "resurrection", kanji translates as "returning blade") to absorb its zanpakutō to use its full power, it transforms into a form reminiscent of its original hollow with all previous injuries healed.

== Known Hollows ==
The majority of named hollows appearing in Bleach are monsters of the week used during Bleach's first arc. After Ichigo's return from Soul Society, the hollow-based characters known as arrancar are introduced, with the basic hollows having lesser roles and rarely used as villains except in the anime side-story episodes.

Fishbone D (フィッシュボーン D, Fisshubōn Dī)
Voiced by: Yutaka Aoyama (Japanese); Michael Sorich (English)
Fishbone D is a fish-like humanoid Hollow that Rukia Kuchiki was hunting before he attacked the Kurosaki Clinic, resulting in the events that set up the story premise by wounding Rukia who is forced to transfer her powers to Ichigo Kurosaki who kills the Hollow in her stead. Rukia was unable to accurately detect Fishbone D due to Ichigo's very high reishi.

Hexapodus (ヘキサポダス, Hekisapodasu)
Voiced by: Takehito Koyasa (Japanese); Grant George (English)
A six-legged insect-like Hollow with a human-like mask who chased after a 5 year old ghost boy. Purified by Ichigo.

Acidwire (アシッドワイヤー, Ashiddowaiyā)
Voiced by: Yuji Ueda (Japanese); Liam O'Brien (English)
In life, Sora Inoue (井上昊, Inoue Sora) was Orihime's older brother and guardian before he died three years before the events of the series. However, Sora remained in the Land of the Living and watched over Orihime as he eventually begins to feel lonely while resenting the friends she has made as she begins to pray less for him. This, along with being dragged to Hueco Mundo by a Hollow at the behest of Grand Fisher in the anime, causes Sora to transform into the Nāga-like Hollow Acidwire as he proceeds to attack Orihime's friends while separating her soul from her body. During the battle, Acidwire regains his humanity after his mask is shattered in battle with Ichigo, using the Soul Reaper's Zanpakutō to voluntarily purify himself before he could lose his mind again.

Shrieker (シュリーカー, Shurīkā)
Voiced by: Hisao Egawa (Japanese); JB Blanc (English)
Shrieker is a frog/bat-like Hollow with the ability to summon numerous explosive minions. Shrieker was a serial killer in life who died when a boy Yūichi Shibata attempted to save his mother from the murderer. After becoming a Hollow, Shrieker gets revenge on Yūichi by placing his soul in a cockatiel and lying that he can revive the boy's mother if he evades him for three months. However, Shrieker only started the game to gain more victims for those Yūichi such as two Soul Reapers who tried to save the boy. Shrieker attacks Yasutora "Chad" Sado when he adopted Yūichi, leading to his death. But as Shrieker committed evil acts while human, he is dragged into Hell. In an episode a tie-in to the Bleach: Hell Verse, still possessing his Hollow powers, a vengeful Shrieker returns to the Land of the Living as a Sinner to attack Rukia. Though Shrieker is forced to escape back to hell after being defeated by Renji Abarai, it turned out Shriker was a pawn in Gunjō's experiment and was disposed of once he served his purpose.

Grand Fisher (グランドフィッシャー, Gurando Fisshā)
Voiced by: Chafurin (Japanese); Paul St. Peter (English)
Introduced as the first major antagonist in the series, Grand Fisher is a fur-covered hollow who gain notoriety for eluding the Soul Reapers for over 54 years and can have the anglerfish lure protruding from his forehead assume the form of a human girl or whoever he chooses after viewing his prey's memories. Years before the events of the series, Grand Fisher attempted to lure a nine-year Ichigo and ended up killing the boy's mother Masaki. Ichigo fights Grand Fisher on the anniversary of Masaki's death, defeating the Hollow but unable to prevent him from fleeing when his lure transforms into his mother. Grand Fisher then retreats to Hueco Mundo, allying himself with Aizen's faction with Aisslinger Wernarr causing his transition into an Arrancar. Once a complete Arrancar of unknown number rank, Grand Fisher attempted to hunt down Ichigo, only to end up chasing down Kon in Ichigo's body before being killed by Masaki's husband Isshin Kurosaki. Ichigo later learns that Grand Fisher was only able to kill Masaki as a result of her being affected by Yhwach's Auswählen.

Demi-Hollow (半虚 (デミ・ホロウ), Demi-Horō)
Voiced by: Susumu Chiba (Japanese); Wally Wingert (English)
A frog-faced Hollow that was created when the chain of a Jabakurei at the hospital was broken. Defeated by Ichigo Kurosaki.

Bulbous G (バルバス G, Barubasu Jī)
Voiced by: Hisao Egawa (Japanese); John DeMita (English)
A muscular bipedal Hollow with a Chinese guardian lion-like mask. Destroyed by Yasutora Sado's Fullbring attack.

Numb Chandelier (ナム シャンデリア, Namu Shanderia)
Voiced by: Yōko Soumi (Japanese); Barbara Goodson (English)
An jellyfish-masked Hollow with twelve tentacles. Destroyed by Orihime Inoue's Koten Zanshun attack.

Metastacia (メタスタシア, Metasutashia)
Voiced by: Hōchū Ōtsuka (Japanese); Kyle Hebert (English)
Metastacia is a quadrupedal hollow with many tentacles growing from his back, introduced in a flashback establishing Rukia Kuchiki's past. As one of Sousuke Aizen's creations, Metastacia specializes in hunting Soul Reapers as his tentacles have the ability to shatter Zanpakutō while he can merge into the body of a Soul Reaper, possessing the host permanently. When his lair in Soul Society is attacked by the Soul Reapers, Metastacia possesses Kaien Shiba after having assimilated his wife prior, forcing Rukia Kuchiki to defeat him by impaling Kaien's body. He is at that point believed dead, but it is later revealed that Metastacia survives long enough to return to Hueco Mundo, where Aaroniero Arruruerie devours him and indirectly gains Kaien's powers.

Bawabawa (バワバワ)
Voiced by: Hiroki Yasumoto (Japanese); Phineas Willow (English)
Bawabawa is an eel-like worm Hollow who acts as both pet and transportation for Nel Tu and her companions. He can be summond from within Dondochakka.

Runuganga (ルヌガンガ, Runuganga)
Voiced by: Taketora (Japanese); Lex Lang (English)
A large sand-based Hollow and Guardian of the White Sand who can control sand. Destroyed by Rukia Kuchiki's Hakuren.

Hooleer (フーラー, Fūrā)
A large bulbous Hollow working for Sosuke Aizen. It was first seen assisting the Gillian in rescuing Aizen and his followers. Destroyed by Mashiro Kuna.

White (ホワイト, Howaito)
Another of Aizen's early experiments in blending hollow and Soul Reaper abilities, created from Soul Reaper souls, White is a black-colored, horned, humanoid hollow. Years before the events of the series, White hunts Soul Reapers until he is defeated by the combined efforts of Isshin Shiba and Masaki Kurosaki. However, it is revealed that Aizen created White with the ability to infect his victims with a fragment of his spirit to induce hollowification. While Aizen intended White to infect a Soul Reaper, the hollow infected Masaki instead. The circumstances of the event results with Isshin sacrificing his Soul Reaper powers and live with Masaki to allow her to live a normal life as they eventually married. The infection is transmitted to their son Ichigo Kurosaki at birth and served in the formation of Ichigo's own inner hollow.

Teres Holcan (テレスホルカン, Teresuhorukan)
Voiced by: Takaya Kuroda (Japanese); David Vincent (English)
An Adjuchas-class Hollow with a snapping turtle-shaped mask who is one of the Guardians of the Forest of Menos. Defeated by Rukia Kuchiki and Ashido Kanō.

Aromazon (アロマゾン, Aromazon)
Voiced by: Ryō Sugisaki
An Adjuchas-class Hollow with a green body and a gorilla-shaped mask who is one of the Guardians of the Forest of Menos. Defeated by Ashido Kanō.

Becunes (ベキュネス, Bekunesu)
Voiced by: Masahito Yabe
An extremely tall Adjuchas-class Hollow with a bulbous pig-like mask who is one of the Guardians of the Forest of Menos. Defeated by Rukia Kuchiki.

Parateraul (パラテラウル, Paraterauru)
Voiced by: Yuichi Nakamura
An Adjuchas-class Hollow with a jackal/anteater-like mask. While defeated by Ichigo Kurosaki, Parateraul was last seen falling off a cliff when Ichigo's group were fleeing the Forest of Menos.

Zonzain (ゾンザイン, Zonzain)
Voiced by: Hiroki Yasumoto (Japanese); Pete Sepenuk (English)
A large sunflower/worm-like Hollow. He was destroyed by Kon's Karakura-Raizer form.

Battikaroa (バティカろあ, Batikaroa)
Voiced by: Daisuke Matsuoka (Japanese); Paul St. Peter (English)
A giant sand-based Hollow and "Sand Guardian" of Los Noches. Destroyed by Renji Abarai.

Michel (ミシェル, Misheru)
Voiced by: Taketoshi Kawano (Japanese); Matthew Mercer (English)
A greyish brown-furred dog-like Hollow who assisted the Unnamed Female Arrancar in attacking Karakura Town. Destroyed by Kon.

== Arrancar ==
The Arrancar are more humanoid Hollows who were the results of them removing their Hollow masks.

=== Espada ===
The Espadas. Top row from left to right: Nnoitra, Barragan, Grimmjow, Aaroniero, Halibel. Bottom row from left to right: Yammy, Stark, Ulquiorra, Szayelaporro, Zommari.

The Espadas (十刃(エスパーダ), Esupāda; Spanish for "sword", kanji translates as "ten blades") are an order of ten Arrancar who are the strongest and most powerful in Sousuke Aizen's army; each member represents an aspect of death (according to Bleach lore). They are ranked from 10 to 1 based on reiatsu density (not necessarily battle skill or prowess), with 10 the weakest and 1 the strongest. However, the Espadas are also ranked from 9 to 0, since Yammy Llargo, basically the weakest Espada, can become the strongest when certain conditions are met. Espadas ranked 4 to 0 are forbidden from using Resurrección within the confines of Las Noches due to their immense destructive potential, which could be enough to destroy the fortress. Espadas may be demoted when they are maimed, replaced by a more powerful arrancar, or have violated Aizen's orders. The Espadas are also allowed to personally choose any two-digit arrancar as their direct subordinate, referred to as their Fracción (従属官(フラシオン), Furashion; Spanish for "fraction," kanji translates as "Subordinate Official"). Each Espada also possesses a Caja de Negación (反膜の匪(カハ・デ・ネガシオン), Kaha de Negashion; Spanish for "Negation Box", kanji translates as "Negativization of Movements"), a cube-like item whose apparent function is to temporarily seal away any one Fracción as a punishment, but may also be used on Espada arrancar.

==== Yammy Riyalgo ====
Yammy Riyalgo (ヤミー・リヤルゴ, Yamī Riyarugo; romanized as Yammy Llargo in the Japanese media), as signified by the "10" tattooed to his left shoulder, is the Decimo Espada, but only when he is not in his Resurrección form. The aspect of death he represents is rage. Yammy is also "Espada Number 0", as the "1" on his tattoo flakes off through his Resurrección, and thus the most powerful Espada. Yammy primarily uses his brute strength, along with bala and Cero blasts, in battle, taking little interest in using his sword unless he is overwhelmed.

He has three unique abilities: the first is called Gonzui (魂吸(ゴンズイ); kanji translates as "soul suction"), which allows him to suck souls from living humans en masse within a wide area, except those with reishi, which allows them to resist the technique. The second is to conserve reiatsu through much eating and rest. The third is to gain additional spiritual pressure from his rage. The name of his Zanpakutō is Ira (憤獸(イーラ), Īra; Spanish for "Anger," kanji translates as "Angry Beast"). When released, all the reiatsu he has conserved beforehand will be unleashed, granting him the rank 0 (assuming he has conserved enough reiatsu), causing Yammy's size and power to increase dramatically as he takes on the form of an incredibly gigantic, multi-legged Ankylosaurus-like centaur. In this form, Yammy can easily crush Soul Reapers with one of his huge hands, create extremely massive ceros, and boasts being stronger than Ulqiuorra, Nnoitra, and Grimmjow combined. Furthermore, Yammy may gain additional sequential transformations whenever his rage becomes high enough, these forms resembling different animals, with each form much more powerful and titanic than the one before it.

Yammy is one of the first arrancars to be introduced, appearing alongside Ulquiorra when they arrive in the human world to find Ichigo Kurosaki. Soon after they arrive, Ichigo and his friends appear, and a battle occurs between them, during which Yammy loses an arm to Ichigo before they retreat. Later, an arrancar surgeon reattaches Yammy's arm and he accompanies Luppi, Grimmjow, and Wonderweiss to attack the Soul Reapers in the human world. He shortly loses to Kisuke before he and his allies fall back to Hueco Mundo. There, he rests and eats as much as he can, later appearing during Ichigo's battle with Ulquiorra. He fights Uryu (who was protecting Orihime), which ends with Yammy falling to the bottom of the palace due to Uryu's anti-arrancar land mines. He later interrupts Rukia, Renji, and Sado's battle against Rudbornn Chelute, accidentally smashing the subdued arrancar. Yammy enters resurreccion and defeats Rukia, Chad, and Renji. As he is about to kill Rukia, Ichigo saves her and takes over the battle. Though Ichigo is also overwhelmed, Byakuya Kuchiki and Kenpachi Zaraki intervene and engage Yammy so that Ichigo can proceed to the human world to deal with Aizen. While Byakuya and Kenpachi manage to disable Yammy, he undergoes a second, much larger transformation. He is eventually defeated by two Soul Reapers offscreen.

He is voiced by Kenji Nomura in the original Japanese version of the anime and by Paul St. Peter in the English dub.

==== Coyote Stark & Lilinette Gingerbuck ====
Coyote Stark (コヨーテ・スターク, Koyōte Sutāku; romanized as Coyote Starrk in the Japanese media) is the Primera Espada, signified by the "1" tattooed on the back of his left hand. The aspect of death he represents is solitude. His sole Fracción is Lilinette Gingerbuck (リリネット・ジンジャーバック, Ririnetto Jinjābakku; romanized as Lilynette Gingerbuck in the Japanese media), who is actually a part of him. Naturally created Arrancars, Stark and Lilynette were created from a single hollow that split its soul into two out of loneliness caused by its vast spiritual pressure being too deadly for weaker hollows and lesser beings to be around. Though Starrk does not remember their original hollow form, the fact he had a counterpart for company was comforting. The two encountered Aizen sometime after coming into being and allied with him as they saw him to be someone who can stay with them without dying. Lilynette typically shows the concern that Starrk does not, giving him incentive. Their personalities are foils of a sort: Starrk appears to be lazy and uninterested in fighting, often not fighting at his full power, and Lilinette is apparently aggressive and vicious.

Starrk has a somewhat implied extremely fine visual acuity. Although Lilinette is essentially Starrk's zanpakutō, he has a reiatsu sword which he uses to fight before his release. The Ceros he fires are larger than those of the other Espadas (potentially except those of the Resurrección Yammy). Lilynette, while aggressive, is weaker and her Cero is described as less powerful than that of a Gillian. Due to their nature, Starrk has to absorb Lilynette back into him in order to assume his Resurrección. Upon releasing Los Lobos (群狼(ロス・ロボス), Rosu Robosu; Spanish for "The Wolves," kanji translates as "Wolf Pack"), Starrk's and Lilynette's reiatsu swords disappear, and Starrk transforms to resemble a gunslinger, gaining a fur-lined suit, a pair of bandoliers, and a left eyepiece resembling Lilynette's mask fragment. Starrk takes on some of Lilynette's personality quirks, becoming more vocal and short tempered. He wields two ornamental guns that fire off ceros in rapid succession, one of the guns being Lilynette with whom he is able to converse. With his right pistol, Starrk can use a cero variety called Cero Metralleta (無限装弾虚閃(セロ・メトラジェッタ), Sero Metorajetta; Spanish for "Sub-Machine Gun Zero," kanji translates as "Infinite Ammunition Hollow Flash"), which is a cero that is split into myriads of explosives, with each piece as powerful as his regular cero, and these pieces are fired thousands at a time. However, Starrk's and Lilinette's true ability is to splinter portions of their spirit to create an army of powerful spirit energy wolves that obey their creator's commands and detonate at will. These wolves can also teleport, and they bite Starrk's targets to keep them from escaping. Once they explode or are hit by an attack, they instantly reform, and therefore they are virtually indestructible; however, in the anime, they can be destroyed only by Kyōraku (one of the Soul Reaper characters)'s bushogoma technique. Though Starrk's guns are sacrificed for him to use their true ability, with most of Lilynette's soul being mixed in the wolves, Starrk can conjure swords for close combat.

During the battle at the fake Karakura town, Starrk is engaged into a duel by Shunsui Kyoraku, to whom he suggests that they pretend to fight until everyone else is done. Lilynette attempts to fight Jushiro Ukitake, who easily disarms her. When Starrk sees the bankai of the other captains, he calls Lilynette and he releases, partly to bribe Shunsui into activating his bankai. Starrk later finds himself also fighting against Ukitake, who views the fight as a two-on-two battle. Later, Wonderweiss arrives and stabs Ukitake, and Starrk fires a Point blank Cero on Kyoraku, temporarily placing him out of the battle. The Visoreds arrive, and Starrk finds himself against the Visoreds Love and Rose. Later, Baraggan is defeated, and Starrk takes great offense to his death; this, along with Lilynette's egging him on, causes Starrk to unleash their true ability on the Visoreds, allowing them to overcome Love and Rose. Before Starrk could deliver the finishing blow, however, he receives a stab from behind coming from Shunsui Kyoraku. He and Starrk fight. In the anime, Lilynette's being is extinguished once Kyōraku takes out all of Stark's wolves; a scene not present in the original manga. The battle ends with Stark fatally wounded by Kyōraku, apologizing to Aizen not repaying him as he crashes to the ground below. In his final moments, Starrk realizes he was never alone due to Lilynette and the other Espadas.

Tite Kubo admitted at one point in an interview that Starrk had a second release like Ulquiorra did, but never used it for some reason.

Starrk and Lilynette are voiced by Rikiya Koyama and Kiyomi Asai respectively in the original Japanese version of the anime and by Keith Silverstein and Kate Higgins respectively in the English dub.

==== Baraggan Louisenbairn ====
Baraggan Louisenbairn (バラガン・ルイゼンバーン, Baragan Ruizenbān; romanized as Barragán Louisenburn in the Japanese media) is the Segunda Espada. His name references Mexican architect Luis Barragán, on whose minimalistic architectural style the design of Hueco Mundo's castles was based. Before becoming an Espada, Barragan was a warlord in Hueco Mundo, ruling from a roofless castle as the self-titled "God of Hueco Mundo", boasting that his palace does not need an actual roof because all the skies of Hueco Mundo are his roof. Aizen, in preparation to defect from the Soul Society, offered Baraggan greater power if he would ally with him. Though he refused the offer, Baraggan was forced to submit after Aizen easily killed many of his followers and bore a grudge against the Soul Reaper through his entire career as an Espada.

As an Espada, Baraggan's representation of death is senescence, the death brought on by age. He has the unique ability to control entropy, weakening and slowing down the bodies of enemies who come near to him as if they had become elderly; thus, he can easily avoid the attacks of his opponents. His touch can make the body parts of his enemies age to the point of becoming immovable and useless. His zanpakutō is Arrogante (髑髏大帝(アロガンテ), Arogante; Spanish for "Arrogant," kanji translates as "Great Skull Emperor"), a giant battle-axe which he stores inside his throne of skulls. When released, Baraggan returns to his original hollow form: a hovering crowned lich, and manifests his original hollow form's weapon, a larger axe named Gran Caída (滅亡の斧(グラン･カイダ), Guran Kaida; Spanish for "Great Fall," kanji translates as "Downfallen Axe"). In this form, Baraggan's aging powers are intensified to the point where everything around him is continuously rotting away and being totally destroyed (because of this, almost no attacks ever touch him), and he can exhale Respira (死の息吹(レスピラ), Resupira; Spanish for "breathe", kanji translates as "Breath of Death"), a mist that erodes whatever it touches. This ranges from decaying both living and non-living things into dust to deteriorating magical barriers and weapons. Respira is double-edged, but Baraggan is usually unaffected as his exterior is covered with something that helps protect his body from his own attack's effect.

After all of his Fracciones are killed, Baraggan engages Soi Fon and Omaeda personally, temporarily gaining the upperhand, until the intervention of the Visoreds. By creating multiple barriers of kido, the Visored Hachigen is able to contain Baraggan's aging abilities to the point that Soifon is able to wound the Espada with her bankai. Enraged, Baraggan releases his Respira at full force, eventually decaying Hachigen's right arm. Before the aging can spread, however, Hachigen uses his kido to teleport it and the Respira affecting it inside Barragan's stomach. Baraggan's own ability dissolves him from the inside out and he makes one last unsuccessful attempt on Aizen's life before dying. His crown later fell to the ground and shattered.

Baraggan is voiced by Shōzō Iizuka in the original Japanese version of the anime. In the English dub, he is voiced first by Steve Kramer in the Hueco Mundo arc and then by Michael McConnohie in the Fake Karakura Town arc.

==== Tier Halibel ====
Tier Halibel (ティア・ハリベル, Tia Hariberu; romanized as Tier Harribel in the Japanese media) is the Tercera Espada, signified by the "3" tattooed on the left side of her right breast. She is also the only female Espada. The aspect of death she represents is sacrifice. She appears calm and rarely speaks; when she does, it is fairly serious. In contrast to the majority of her fellow Espada, Halibel prefers not to engage in combat, much less commit acts of unnecessary slaughter; she is content with silently observing the battle between Soul Reapers and Arrancars until it reaches its conclusion and refuses to fight unless she or her Fracciones are challenged or ordered by her superiors. The only reason she wants power is to protect those who she cares about such as her Fracciones.

In the anime, Halibel's backstory as a shark-like Vasto Lorde, in which she gathers female Menos to work together against more aggressive male Menos that consider them easy prey, is revealed. After saving the three Adjuchas named Emilou Apacci, Franceska Mila Rose, and Cyan Sung-Sun, who joined her campaign, Halibel becomes at odds with Baraggan for defying him and made an enemy out of a Hammerhead hollow who attacked her group once becoming an arrancar. Only able to survive because of Aizen's intervention, touched by his speech of not wanting needless sacrifice, Halibel joins his group with her three comrades becoming her Fracciónes: the Tres Bestias.

Her Zanpakutō is named Tiburón (皇鮫后(ティブロン), Tiburon; Spanish for "Shark", kanji translates as "Imperial Shark Empress"). She carries it horizontally behind her shoulders; the sword itself is notably broad and short compared to those of other Espada, and the inner portion is hollow, with only the "outline" of the sword. The sword can create 'ribbons' of energy from the empty inner portion named Ola Azul (波蒼砲(オーラ・アズール), Ōra Azūru; Spanish for "Blue Wave", kanji translate as "Blue Wave Gun") to be used in combat. When released, she loses the portion of the hollow mask that covers her face and gains markings on each side of her face, as well as two wing-like protrusions on her back, an armored skirt, and armor that covers her arms, shoulders and legs. She also carries a massive pata, which resembles an elongated shark tooth. Her strength and speed are increased in this state, evident by the charge and blow she delivers to Tōshirō Hitsugaya, severing a large portion of his upper-body before he could even react (though this was later revealed to be a clone of Hitsugaya made of ice). She is able to conjure and control large amounts of water to perform attacks in this form.

Her battle with Tōshirō starts off in her favor, but soon levels to a draw as their powers are opposites. However, as she attempts to avenge her Fracciónes' apparent deaths by Yamamoto, Tōshirō reveals that his Zanpakutō Hyōrinmaru can control the weather. He then proceeds to trap her in an ice prison with his newly learned Hyōten Hyakkasō technique, leaving her to die. However, Wonderweiss arrives and frees her by just yelling. Halibel then engages Tōshirō and the Visards Hiyori and Lisa, maintaining her ground despite being outnumbered. After witnessing the deaths of Stark and Barragan, Aizen interrupts Halibel's battle and slashes her with his sword, stating that she "is not strong enough to fight for him anymore." Halibel recalls her past and, after an unsuccessful attempt to kill him, Aizen cuts Halibel down as she is disillusioned that their ideals on sacrifice are vastly different. Though her injury was fatal, Orihime heals Halibel's wounds at the battle's conclusion, allowing her and the Tres Bestias to return to Hueco Mundo, where Halibel was convinced and reluctantly became the land's ruler by default, in order to restore order upon the Hollows and rebuild. This was due to Hollows lacking a strong central figure to follow, with the death of their former King Barragan and Aizen's betrayal left Hueco Mundo in chaos.

Seventeen months later, Halibel is defeated by the Wandenreich leader, Yhwach, and is imprisoned while her captors conquer Hueco Mundo. It is later revealed Halibel was rescued by Nelliel and Grimmjow near the end of the Thousand Year Blood War arc, and was reinstated as Ruler of Hueco Mundo after Yhwach's defeat.

She is voiced by Megumi Ogata in the original Japanese version of the anime and by Laura Bailey in the English dub and by Jeannie Tirado in the Thousand-Year Blood War arc.

==== Nelliel Tu Odelschwanck ====
Nelliel Tu Odelschwanck (ネリエル・トゥ・オーデルシュヴァンク, Nerieru Tu Ōderushuvanku), commonly known as Nel Tu (ネル・トゥ, Neru Tu) or "Nel" for short, is a good-natured, childlike arrancar when first introduced and has a habit of saying the opposite of what she actually meant. The remains of her hollow mask make up a cartoonish skull on the top of her head. She is really the former 3rd Espada, resembling a full-grown woman with a ram-horned version of her hollow mask and bearing a large "3" tattooed on her back. Compared to the other Espadas, having empathy for the least fortunate hollows that remain as feral monsters, Nelliel has a sense of honor and respect for her opponents who she sees as warriors and only kills with good reason. This ideology results with her being attacked by Nnoitra Gilga from behind as part of the Espada's revenge scheme with the help of Szayelaporro's device, managing to crack her mask and tossing her unconscious body out of Las Noches before enough of her spirit energy leaked out to shrink her into current form. But as the resulting amnesia freed her of the sorrow that plagued her, Nel was able to live a carefree life with her two Fracciones bent on protecting her from the dangers of Hueco Mundo while making sure she does not remember.

By the time she is introduced in the series, Nel and her companions encounter Ichigo Kurosaki's group and help them as their guides in Hueco Mundo, though were originally afraid of Soul Reapers as they saw them to be the bad guys. But Nel develops an attachment to Ichigo and starts following him around after her introduction. As a result, when she encounters Nnoitra as he begins to torture Ichigo, Nel assumes her true form with her memories restored. Though considerably more mature than her child form, Nelliel retains her childlike voice and affection for Ichigo, as she comically hugs him without realizing that her strength is causing him personal injury. As she is about to defeat Nnoitra after assuming her released form, Nelliel reverts to her child form and was knocked unconscious before she came to as a witness to Nnoitra's death.

Seventeen months after Aizen's defeat and sometime later after Ichigo regains his Soul Reaper powers, Nel arrives in Karakura Town and tells Ichigo about the Wandenreich, who have taken over Hueco Mundo. Both she and Pesche also inform him that Dondochakka was captured. After Kisuke gives her an armband that allows her to consciously assume her adult form, Nelliel later appears alongside Grimmjow to help Ichigo's team in the fight against Yhwach.

In her child-state, Nel's vomit (though she claims it to be saliva) acts as a rather weak but useful healing agent. In both her child and adult form, she can swallow Cero attacks and fire them back. In her adult form, she can also add her own Cero to this blast, doubling its power, aptly named a Cero Doble (重奏虚閃(セロ・ドーブル), Sero Dōburu; Spanish for "Double Zero", kanji translates as "Heavy Performance Hollow Flash").

Nelliel's Zanpakutō, which manifests when she transforms, is named Gamuza (羚騎士(ガミューサ), Gamyūsa; Spanish for suede, kanji translates as "Antelope Knight"). Her released form is that of an ibex-like centaur with longer curved horns, a thick tail, and armor over her shoulders and hands. Her sword transforms into a double-ended white lance, giving her the appearance of a medieval knight or a jouster. One of her attacks in this form is called Lanzador Verde (翠の射槍(ランサドール・ヴェルデ), Ransadōru Verude; Spanish for "Green Lancer", kanji translates as "Green Javelin"), in which she throws her lance directly at her opponent. The lance moves at high speed and rotates extremely fast, drilling through anything it hits.

Nelliel is voiced by Tomoko Kaneda in the original Japanese version of the anime while the role of her adult form is taken over by Arisa Kiyoto in the Thousand-Year Blood War. In the English dub, she is by Colleen O'Shaughnessey (except in the English dub of Bleach: Soul Resurrección where she was voiced by Stephanie Sheh).

==== Ulquiorra Cifer ====
Ulquiorra Cifer (ウルキオラ・シファー, Urukiora Shifā; romanized as Ulquiorra Schiffer in the Japanese media) is the Cuarta Espada, signified by the "4" tattooed to his chest. His name is believed to either come from a furniture designer named Patricia Urquiola or a variation of "the one who cries" in Spanish which is El Que Llora.

As an albino hollow ostracized by other dark-colored hollows, Ulquiorra is revealed in side stories to have come into being as a Vasto Lorde ages ago before the balance of life and death was established where hollows manifested from the chaotic influx rather than from human souls. As an Espada member who represents the aspect of death of Emptiness, Ulquiorra is emotionless with an inability to comprehend the meaning of "heart" and supports his firm belief that what his eye cannot see does not exist. Bent on completing tasks set to him by Sousuke Aizen, Ulquiorra has no qualms about attacking his own allies if they impede his intent and deems anyone he finds not to be of particular interest to be "trash," and therefore expendable. The remainder of Ulquiorra's hollow mask, partially destroyed before his conversion, forms a broken helmet with a curved horn and covers the left half of his head. His hollow hole has moved since his first appearance; when first introduced it is at the base of his neck, but in later appearances, it is centered just below his collarbone.

Grimmjow Jaegerjaquez notes that Ulquiorra tends to stab opponents in the same location as his hollow hole whenever he is particularly interested in a battle, though it is unclear if Ulquiorra is conscious of this habit. Ulquiorra is very analytical: he almost accurately theorizes the means behind Orihime Inoue's abilities, and recognizes that Ichigo Kurosaki's power constantly fluctuates between very weak to greater than his own strength. He also refrains from killing a person unless necessary, twice sparing Ichigo and proclaiming he would not harm Orihime because he had not been ordered to. He can replay events he has seen to others by removing and crushing his left eye, which turns into dust and flows around those to whom Ulquiorra is relaying information. While other hollows traded defensive abilities for raw strength upon becoming arrancars, Ulquiorra maintained his high-speed regeneration abilities with only his brain and internal organs unregenerable.

When released, his zanpakutō, Murciélago (黒翼大魔(ムルシエラゴ), Murushierago; Spanish for "Bat," kanji translates as "Giant Black-winged Demon") creates two large black bat-like wings on his back. His hollow helmet is complete and sports two large horns, while his arrancar uniform appears more form-fitting at the top, becoming robe-like towards the bottom. His release gives him extremely high speed, with Ichigo Kurosaki, a character who uses super speed himself, being unable to keep up with Ulquiorra's attacks. In this form, Ulquiorra can create "lances" of spiritual energy which he uses for both long-ranged and melee attacks; he can also use a stronger Cero variety called Cero Oscuras (黒虚閃(セロ・オスキュラス), Sero Osukyurasu; Spanish for "Dark Zero", kanji translates as "Black Hollow Flash"); Ulquiorra claimed that all Espadas can supposedly use it upon release, but he is the only one who ever used it. Additionally, Ulquiorra is unique among the Espadas in that he has a second release, Resurrección Segunda Etapa (刀剣解放第二階層(レスレクシオン・セグンダ・エターパ), Resurekushion Segunda Etāpa; Spanish for "Resurrection Second Stage", kanji translates as "Sword's Release: Second Level"). He becomes demonic and black-furred with clawed hands and feet, his espada number completely disappears from his skin, his sclera turn green, he grows a long thin prehensile tail, and gains markings similar to blood flowing freely from his hollow hole where his heart would be. Ulquiorra's second release is said to be secret to everybody, even from Aizen thus making him the strongest Espada. In this new form, his reiatsu lances develop flame-like tips, these are dubbed as Lanza del Relámpago (雷霆の槍(ラソサ・デル・レランパーゴ), Ransa deru Reranpāgo; Spanish for "Spear of Lightning"), and when thrown, explode upon impact; these detonations are immense enough to dwarf even the massive Las Noches, which is apparently bigger and much taller than a large city; this technique is the most destructive out of all the Espadas. While his second release makes his lances much more powerful, Ulquiorra notes that they also become difficult to control, as seen when he misses Ichigo with his first one.

Ulquiorra is one of the first arrancars to be introduced, appearing alongside Yammy Riyalgo in the real world on Aizen's orders to seek out Ichigo. The pair leaves without killing him when Ulquiorra sees Ichigo's current strength as no threat to Aizen. He does, however, remark that he is concerned over Ichigo's growth potential, stating that if he should pose a threat, then he would kill Ichigo himself. He later kidnaps Orihime for Aizen, serving as her jailer and forcing her to remain alive for Aizen's use. When Ichigo leads his group to Las Noches, Ulquiorra confronts Ichigo and provokes him into fighting. He easily withstands and defeats Ichigo's hollow form, then leaves Ichigo for dead. Much later, after escaping imprisonment by the Espada Grimmjow's Caja de Negación, Ulquiorra engages Ichigo in another battle before taking Orihime to Aizen. Entrusted to guard Las Noches while Aizen and his forces engage the Soul Reapers in the Fake Karakura Town, Ulquiorra engages Ichigo in a final battle that leads him to take their conflict above Las Noches to fight at his full power. However, thinking that he killed him, Ulquiorra unknowingly finds himself facing a semi-hollowified Ichigo with his internal organs heavily damaged. Mortally wounded, managing to get him back to normal, Ulquiorra asks Ichigo to finish him off before he dissolves and the battle between them remains unresolved. But Ichigo, not intending the fight to result in this manner refuses to. As he dies, Ulquiorra comes to understand the meaning of "heart" when an unafraid Orihime reaches out to him as his body dissolves into the wind.

He is voiced by Daisuke Namikawa in the original Japanese version of the anime. In the English dub, he is voiced by Tony Oliver (except in the English dub of Bleach: Shattered Blade where he was voiced by Steve Blum).

==== Nnoitra Gilga ====
Nnoitra Gilga (ノイトラ・ジルガ, Noitora Jiruga) is the Quinta Espada, signified by the "5" tattooed to his tongue, and previously held the Octavo Espada rank. The aspect of death he represents is despair; this is shown through his opponents losing hope because of being unable to make injuries on his body. He fights for Aizen so that he can find death in battle against a powerful opponent, and claims that the only time he feels truly alive is when he is gurgling on his own blood. He is a misogynist and hates the idea of a woman being stronger than or outranking a man, particularly himself. Despite wanting the honor of dying a "warrior's death" and being accepted and treated as an opponent's equal in battle, he is not above using unfair methods to claim victory and will even torture and kill opponents who are already exhausted from a previous battle. He has a single fracción Tesla Lindocruz (テスラ・リンドクルズ, Tesura Rindokuruzu; romanized as Tesra Lindocruz in the Japanese media), a younger man who idolizes him, and a long-standing and vicious rivalry with former espada Nelliel Tu Oderschvank. Nnoitra wears a large eye-patch that covers most of the left side of his face, where the remnants of his hollow mask (a small set of jawbones and teeth) and his hollow hole are located.

Nnoitra has the strongest hierro of any Espada, dense enough that most attacks have little effect on him, and this makes him the most durable Espada (except for the released Yammy). His zanpakutō Santa Teresa (聖哭螳螂(サンタテレサ); Spanish for "Saint Theresa" but used as "Mantis", kanji translates as "Sacred Crying Mantis") takes the form of a giant polearm bearing two crescent blades fused together at their backs. It is shown via several flashbacks that it used to only have one crescent. In his released state, Nnoitra gains two additional pairs of insectoid arms, and each of his hands gains an identical scythe-like weapon. Nnoitra can regenerate these extra arms.

Although initially ordered to remain on standby, Nnoitra seeks out Ichigo and his friends in hopes of looking for a good fight. After easily defeating Chad, Nnoitra goes to the site of the battle between Ichigo Kurosaki and Grimmjow Jaegerjaquez, where he intrudes on the two at the moment of Ichigo's victory. He defeats and tortures the exhausted combatants, but is prevented from murdering them by Nelliel, who, it is revealed, he had long ago dishonorably defeated and ejected from the Espada because he hated her for being ranked above him. Nelliel and Nnoitra fight, and Nelliel holds the advantage for a time, but fails to defeat Nnoitra when she reverts to her child form on the verge of triumph. Kenpachi Zaraki then arrives on the scene and the two duel, both finding great enjoyment in the fact that they can survive each other's attacks. After a long and destructive battle, Nnoitra is defeated and granted his "warrior's death" by Kenpachi, losing consciousness a split second before his body hits the ground.

Nnoitra is voiced by Nobutoshi Canna in the original Japanese version of the anime and by Michael Sinterniklaas in the English dub.

==== Grimmjow Jaggerjack ====
Grimmjow Jaggerjack (グリムジョー・ジャガージャック, Gurimujō Jagājakku; romanized as Grimmjaw Jägerjacques in the Japanese media) is the Sexta Espada, signified by the "6" tattooed to his back. His name comes from European architect Nicholas Grimshaw and the German word for hunter. Grimmjow has a defiant, punk attitude towards authority, and can be cowed only by Sousuke Aizen. Despite his personality, Grimmjow has a sense of honor, repays those he feels indebted to, and is unwilling to battle handicapped opponents. Motivated by his dream to become a hollow king, Grimmjow was originally a panther-like Adjuchas Hollow who led a close-knit gang of five other Adjuchas who all became his fracciónes after their transition into arrancars. Grimmjow dresses in a vest over bare skin and loose pants, and sports blue hair in a style popularized by Billy Idol. A still-articulated right jawbone is all that remains of Grimmjow's hollow mask, and his hollow hole is located on his abdomen.

The aspect of death Grimmjow represents is destruction, a trait he embodies through his savage combat style and violent lust for battle. Grimmjow is a highly skilled fighter, able to temporarily imprison the more powerful Ulquiorra in his Caja de Negación by exploiting surprise. When his Zanpakutō Pantera (豹王(パンテラ); Spanish for "Panther," kanji translates as "Panther King") is released he gains the physical traits of a panther, with prominent jagged teeth, feline ears, clawed hands and feet, an armored hide, and a tail that can be used as a powerful whip. His released state augments his speed and power, allows him to fire destructive darts from his elbows, and protrude immense energy claws called Desgarrón (豹王の爪(デスガロン), Desugaron; Spanish for "Laceration," kanji translates as "Panther King's Claw") that end at his fingertips. Grimmjow can use the most powerful Cero variety out of any Espada, the Gran Rey Cero (王虚の閃光(グラン・レイ・セロ), Guran Rei Sero; Spanish for "Grand King Zero", kanji translates as "Royal Hollow Flash"); Grimmjow and Ulquiorra claim that all Espadas can use it, but only Grimmjow did in the original manga and anime. This Cero variant is banned in Las Noches because it is so destructive that its power threatens to destroy the palace.

Grimmjow enters the story early in the Arrancar Arc, the third Espada shown but the first to be introduced as such. He and his fracciónes impulsively attack Ichigo Kurosaki's hometown after learning of Ichigo's power, but are defeated by the Soul Reapers stationed there, with only Grimmjow returning alive after an aborted battle with Ichigo. He is demoted and maimed for this insolence and failure, but is later healed by Orihime Inoue, and regains his rank immediately by murdering his replacement, Luppi Antenor. After his initial battle with Ichigo, the pair form a competitive rivalry as their drive each other to grow stronger until Grimmjow is decisively defeated by Ichigo in Hueco Mundo.

Grimmjow survives this defeat and then Quincy invasion of Hueco Mundo, becoming a reluctant ally of the protagonists so he can settle things with Ichigo once Yhwach is dealt with. While Ichigo, Chad and Orihime move on, Grimmjow helps Urahara in taking out the Schutzstaffel Askin Nakk Le Vaar by ripping out his heart. They are subsequently trapped in the dying Quincey's "Gift Ball Deluxe" ability before being saved by Neliel.

Grimmjow is voiced by Junichi Suwabe in the original Japanese version of the anime and by David Vincent in the English dub.

==== Luppi Antenor ====
Luppi Antenor (ルピ・アンテノール, Rupi Antenōru) temporarily replaces Grimmjow Jaegerjaquez as the Sexta Espada, and has a "6" tattooed to his right hip. He has a youthful, androgynous appearance, and a condescending attitude, particularly towards his enemies and Grimmjow. The remains of his hollow mask (a top row of teeth) rest on the left side of his head, where they resemble a tiara.

Luppi's zanpakutō is Trepadora (蔦嬢(トレパドーラ), Torepadōra; Spanish for "Vine," kanji translates as "Ivy Girl"). In his released state, eight tendrils erupt from a carapace mounted on Luppi's back, which he can control independently to fight multiple opponents. The tentacles can also grow spikes to cause additional damage.

Luppi is introduced midway through the Arrancar Arc, and serves as a minor villain and character foil to Grimmjow. He replaces the disgraced Grimmjow as 6th Espada, and along with Grimmjow, Yammy, and Wonderweiss, is sent to attack Karakura Town. Luppi fights the Soul Reapers there, and holds the upper hand until he is frozen solid by Tōshirō Hitsugaya, at which point he is forced to retreat to Hueco Mundo. On his return, Luppi is shocked to learn that his assault was merely a distraction from the abduction of Orihime Inoue. Orihime then demonstrates her healing powers to the gathered arrancars by restoring Grimmjow Jaegerjaquez's amputated arm, and Grimmjow murders Luppi to regain his Espada rank.

During the second Wandenreich invasion months later, Luppi is revived by Mayuri to assist him in his fight against Giselle.

Luppi is voiced by Daisuke Kishio in the original Japanese version and by Michael Sinterniklaas in the English dub.

==== Zommari Leroux ====
Zommari Leroux (ゾマリ・ルルー, Zomari Rurū; romanized as Zommari Rureaux in the Japanese media) is the Séptima Espada. He is a quiet, reverent, and pragmatic figure that despises Soul Reapers for judging hollows as evil. The aspect of death Zommari represents is intoxication, shown in his worship of Sousuke Aizen. The remnants of his hollow mask take the form of a necklace made out of teeth and a ridge of spikes running down the center of his forehead, and his hollow hole is located on his right breast.

Zommari has the fastest sonido among the Espada, with its fastest version called Gemelos Sonido (双児響転(ヘメロス・ソニード), Hemerosu Sonīdo; Spanish for "Sound Twins"); this is so fast that it rips his body through space, resulting in a clone. Zommari can use this to keep on producing extra bodies with a limit of a total of five bodies (including his original) at a time, thus, he has the fighting strength of up to five people, allowing him to perform tactics and techniques which can only be performed by a group, and use some of his extra bodies as decoys and replace those bodies with new ones. His zanpakutō is Brujería (呪眼僧伽(ブルヘリア), Buruheria; Spanish for "Witchcraft," kanji translates as "Sangha of Bewitching Eyes"), which replaces his legs with a hardened lotus-like structure that he can hide within as a defensive measure. In his released state, his body is covered in eyes, each of which allows him to magically control objects or body parts using the technique Amor (愛(アモール), Amōru; Spanish for "Love"). This technique is described by the character Byakuya Kuchiki as being similar to kidō and can be completely blocked by casting a kidō barrier.

Zommari is introduced during Ichigo's assault on Hueco Mundo, in which he is a minor villain. He obediently holds back from battle until after Rukia Kuchiki defeats Aaroniero Arruruerie. Zommari then takes the field in order to finish off the unconscious Rukia, but is prevented from doing so by Byakuya Kuchiki. The two fight, at first relying on their super-speed but then turning to their zanpakutō releases. Using his Amor, Zommari attempts to dominate Byakuya's body, but is unsuccessful when Byakuya cripples his own limbs to prevent them being used against him. Zommari is then assaulted by Byakuya's bankai, which he is incapable of dominating due to its hundreds of pieces. Zommari remained safe by hiding in his defense, and attempts to use Amor on Byakuya, but Byakuya had observed the technique's resemblance to kidō, and creates magical wall to render it ineffective. Zommari, despite knowing it is already useless, impatiently and desperately uses Amor on Byakuya, who uses Shunpo to instantly move to the location behind Zommari. As Byakuya raises his sword to deliver the finishing blow, Zommari heartfully shouts his final praise to Aizen before meeting his death.

Zommari is voiced by Taiten Kusunoki in the original Japanese version of anime. In the English dub, he is voiced by Greg Eagles up until episode 195 and then by Neil Kaplan thereafter.

==== Szayelaporro Grantz ====
Szayelaporro Grantz (ザエル・アポロ・グランツ, Zaeru Aporo Gurantsu; romanized as Szayel Apollo Granz in the Japanese media) is the Octava Espada, the remains of his hollow mask take the form of rectangular-framed glasses with his hollow hole is located in his groin. The aspect of death he represents is madness, being an arrogant and quite sadistic scientist who views others as research material. He has a variety of methods for analyzing an opponent's abilities, using the data to render himself virtually immune to their attacks. In addition, Szayelaporro has a large number of Fracciones which were originally hollows whom he experimented on and personally modified so that he can heal his wounds by eating them. The light novel side story The Spirits are Forever With You reveals Szayelaporro was originally an alchemist in life before he and his older brother Ilfort Grantz were devoured by a Menos that manifested from the souls of those the brothers had killed. Szayelaporro retained his sense of self and became the Hollow's core as he eventually evolved in a Vasto Lorde serving under Baraggan. He offered himself to Aizen to become the first Zero Espada before deciding to purge Ilfort from his body to perfect himself, gradually rebuilding his strength after losing much of his power in the process. This forced him to aid Nnoitora in his scheme of eliminating Nelliel to regain his membership.

His Zanpakutō is called Fornicarás (邪淫妃(フォルニカラス), Forunikarasu; Spanish for "You will fornicate," kanji translates as "Lewd Princess"); La Lujuriosa in the English dub (Spanish for "The Lustful"), and in his released state he grows two pairs of long tentacles on his back; twelve teardrop-shaped sacs dangle from each tentacle like fruits. He can shoot a shower of purple liquids from his body and with each droplet that comes into contact with an opponent a doppelganger of that enemy is created; each clone has the same abilities as the original, but they are extremely weak and can be instantly defeated by the real one, however each clone splits into more clones upon destruction, and will disappear when Szayelaporro is killed or when Szayelaporro willingly cancels the ability. By using his tentacles to drain nutrients from his opponents, Szayelaporro can create voodoo dolls of them. Each doll can open up to reveal toys which represent internal organs, the destruction of which would do major debilitating damage to the victim from the inside. The ability he prides the most, Gabriel (受胎告知(ガブリエール), Gaburiēru; kanji translates as "the Annunciation"), allows him to be reborn if he is injured beyond repair by impregnating an enemy and absorbing their spirit particles, turning them into his own and killing the victim in the process while his previous body, if devoured, breaks down into cells that fuse into the eater's nervous system, allowing him to gain complete control.

Prior to his introduction, Szayelaporro sends Rudobone to bring him any defeated arrancars in order to analyze the abilities of those who defeated them. Szayelaporro later engages Renji Abarai, introducing himself as Ilfort's brother while revealing to have used the insects he laced on his brother counter Renji's abilities before unleashing his Fracción Medazeppi on him before Uryū Ishida intervenes. Szayelaporro eventually nullifies Uryū's abilities from studying Cirucci's corpse, playing with his opponents before deciding to personally kill them after his domain is destroyed in the fight despite Pesche and Dondochakka's attempted surprise attack.

But Kurotsuchi intervenes and counters each of Szayelaporro's abilities before killing him with his bankai, only for Szayelaporro to momentarily turn the zakupakto on Mayuri while using his Gabriel ability to reconstitute himself through Nemu Kurotsuchi. This allowed him to ingest a large dosage of the experimental "Superhuman Potion" stored inside Nemu's body, increasing his reaction time to the point where one second seems like a century to him. With his physical body unable to compensate for his over-enhanced mental state, Szayelaporro is effectively paralyzed and left to suffer an agonizing death from his perspective by Mayuri shortly after.

In both the anime exclusive prequel to Bleach: Hell Verse and the No Breathes From Hell one shot, Szayelaporro ended up in Hell and became a Gallows of Hell (地獄の獄吏, Jigoku no Gokuri).

He is voiced by Kōsuke Toriumi in the original Japanese version of the anime. In the English dub, he is voiced by Hank Matthews in the earlier appearances of the English dub (Ep. 145-175) and later by Benjamin Diskin.

==== Aaroniero Arruruerie ====
Aaroniero Arruruerie (アーロニーロ・アルルエリ, Āronīro Arurueri) is the Novena Espada, signified by the "9" tattooed on his two faces. The aspect of death he represents is greed. In place of a head, Aaroniero has a pair of infantile skull-like creatures which float inside a glass capsule filled with red liquid, which is usually covered with a tall white mask. The two skulls speak alternately (the top skull speaks with a deep voice, whereas the bottom one speaks with a childlike voice), often finishing each other's sentences, and refer to themselves as "we", suggesting that Aaroniero is, to some degree, two separate beings.

Aaroniero is introduced as one of the last first-generation Espadas as well as the only Gillian member of the current Espadas. But in spite of being a Gillian, Aaroniero is made an Espada due to his unique talent of devouring other Hollows through his tendril-like Zanpakutō, Glotonería (喰虚(グロトネリア), Gurotoneria; Spanish for "Gluttony," kanji translates as "Eating Hollow"), a deformed mouthed appendage in place of his left arm which he usually covers with his robes and a glove. Compared to regular Gillians, Aaroniero can completely incorporate those he consumes into himself, giving him access to their memories and special abilities and even allowing him to shapeshift into their physical form if he so desires. Exposure to sunlight, however, nullifies his powers and forces him back into his original form if he was shapeshifted.

At the time of his appearance, Aaroniero claims to have absorbed 33,650 hollows. Although the full range of his acquired abilities is never shown, they include "synchronized awareness", an ability to project any information and thoughts to his allies' minds, and (through a series of events which culminated with the consumption of the hollow Metastacia) the powers, memories and form of Soul Reaper Kaien Shiba. Furthermore, his zanpakutō release transforms his lower body into a purple, house-sized octopus/blob-like mass with dozens of tentacles and cartoonish mouth-like mask pieces. With Glotonería released, Aaroniero can access the full range of his acquired abilities at will.

After Ichigo and his friends break into Hueco Mundo, Aaroniero seeks out Rukia and, in the guise of Kaien Shiba, attempts to use Rukia's guilt at Kaien's death to trick her first into allowing him to kill her. However, when he almost attempts to trick her into killing her friends, Rukia senses something is amiss and engages him. Though eventually unmasked, Aaroniero reveals that he was not merely shapeshifted, but actually in control of Kaien's spirit body. As she believes that she had freed Kaien Shiba by killing him those many years before, Aaroniero's revelation shatters Rukia's resolve, enabling Aaroniero to overpower and wound her with his own released zanpakutō. Before he can kill her, however, Rukia, spurred on by memories of Kaien, retaliates by stabbing Aaroniero through his upper skull, shattering his glass capsule and reducing the rest of his body to liquid. As he dies, broadcasting his final moments to his allies, Aaroniero's lower skull screams for Aizen's help while the upper skull merely curses Rukia, refusing to accept his defeat, before splitting in half and then dissolving into a purple fluid.

In both the anime exclusive prequel to Bleach: Hell Verse and the No Breathes From Hell one shot, Aaroniero ended up in Hell and became a Gallows of Hell (地獄の獄吏, Jigoku no Gokuri).

In the original Japanese version of the anime, Toshihiko Seki voices Aaroniero's guise as Kaien Shiba while Ryūzaburō Ōtomo voices the top skull and Mayumi Yamaguchi voices the bottom skull. In the English dub, Keith Silverstein voices the top skull and Wendee Lee voices the bottom skull while Dave Mallow voices Aaroniero's guise as Kaien Shiba.

=== Privaron Espada ===
The Privaron Espadas (十刃落ち(プリバロン・エスパーダ), Puribaron Esupāda; Spanish for "Deprived Sword," kanji translates as "Fallen from the Ten Blades") are arrancars that were once Espadas yet were demoted out of either being a disgrace to the group or replaced by the artificially-created arrancars Aizen created with the Hōgyoku. They have received a three-digit number in order to separate them from the regular arrancars since their power is still far above average.

==== Dordoni Alessandro Del Socaccio ====
Arrancar 103 Dordoni Alessandro Del Socaccio (ドルドーニ・アレッサンドロ・デル・ソカッチオ, Dorudōni Aressandoro Deru Sokatchio) is goofier when compared to other Espadas; however, he is much more serious in battle. During his battle with Ichigo Kurosaki, Dordoni tries to goad Ichigo into using his Bankai and hollow mask, hoping to earn his former position back by defeating Ichigo at full power. He is defeated once Ichigo complies, and thanks Ichigo for the favor by fighting against the Exequias to buy Ichigo time to escape, dying by their hands with his final thoughts that Ichigo should discard his kindness while fighting future opponents. His death was later reported to Aizen to be the work of the intruders.

During the second Wandenreich invasion months later, Dordoni is revived by Mayuri to assist him in his fight against Giselle. It is unknown what happened to him afterwards.

Dordoni's zanpakutō is Giralda (暴風男爵(ヒラルダ), Hiraruda; kanji translates as "Storm Baron"), and in his released state, Dordoni grows armor that starts at his feet, wraps around his calves, and juts out at his waist with two more spikes. While released, two enormous cyclones come from exhaust spouts on the armor covering his legs, which keeps him hovering in the air and add extra force to his kicks. In addition, two beak-like extensions jut out from these cyclones, which are used to execute long-range strikes, though Dordoni is also capable of manifesting many more if the need arises.

He is voiced by Kōji Ishii in the original Japanese version of the anime and by Neil Kaplan in the English dub.

==== Cirucci Sanderwicci ====
Arrancar 105 Cirucci Sanderwicci (チルッチ・サンダーウィッチ, Chirutchi Sandāwitchi) has an appearance similar to a gothic lolita; her outfit consists of a frilly dress, large, round sleeves that cut off at her shoulder, short purple-colored hair, teardrop markings on each cheek, and knee-high boots. The remains of her hollow mask are positioned in her hair right above the left side of her forehead and resemble a spiked hairpin. Despite her rather odd appearance, she has no qualms about pointing out when others have similar fashion, as she does to Uryū Ishida. She also follows a soldier-like ideology.

Cirucci's zanpakutō, Golondrina (車輪鉄燕(ゴロンドリーナ), Gorondorīna; Spanish for "Swallow," kanji translates as "Wheeled Steel Swallow"), takes the form of a whip with a large, spinning, Yo-Yo like disk looped into it. When released, Cirucci's arms become longer with claws at the end as she sprouts large wings with ten moon-shaped blades in place of feathers. These blades vibrate at a high frequency, making an audible humming noise in the anime. Cirucci can remove these blades and fire them through the air or summon them back at her own will.

Her released state rapidly consumes her spiritual energy, which Uryū took advantage of before she discarded her released state arms and wings, focusing her spirit energy into a luminous pink blade at the tip of her head crest's tail. But Uryū still defeats her, sealing away her power. Even though letting her live may come as an insult to Cirucci, Uryū spares her life with the inability to get revenge on him. But no sooner did he leave than the Exequias arrive and kill her, taking her corpse to Szayelaporro for research.

During the second Wandenreich invasion months later, Cirucci is revealed to have been revived by Mayuri, as she assists him in his fight against Giselle. She later overhears Mayuri talk about inserting a drug inside of her and says nothing, it is unknown what happened to her afterwards.

She is voiced by Hōko Kuwashima in the original Japanese version of the anime and by Tricia Pierce in the English dub.

==== Gantenbainne Mosqueda ====
Arrancar 107 Gantenbainne Mosqueda (ガンテンバイン・モスケーダ, Gantenbain Mosukēda) has an afro-style haircut with thick sideburns and a goatee. The remains of his hollow mask are a sunglasses-shaped plate on his forehead with four teeth coming out above each eye.

Gantenbainne's Zanpakutō, Dragra (龍拳(ドラグラ), Doragura; kanji translates as "Dragon Fist"), takes the form of a pair of two-pronged punching daggers attached to Gantenbainne's wrists by hinges. In its released state, Gantenbainne's arms grow longer and become covered in dome-shaped armor plates, and the punching daggers come to resemble dragon heads. Similar plates also extend down his back and form a tail. He pulls his mask fragment over his eyes at certain points in combat. When attacking, he can shoot various blasts from his fists.

After Yasutora Sado defeats him, Gantenbainne is spared in thanks for fighting at his full strength while risking defeat. As Chad leaves, Nnoitora Gilga appears wanting to fight the first person to make it out of the domain of the Privaron Espadas. Gantenbainne tells Chad to escape, but Chad attacks Nnoitora and is defeated with a single blow. After Nnoitora senses Ichigo and leaves, the unconscious Chad and Gantenbainne are found by the Exequias. Retsu Unohana intervenes before they can be killed, and heals Chad and Mosqueda's wounds after Rudobone decides to leave and not attack any of them. Gatenbainne's current fate is unknown, but he is most likely still alive.

He is voiced by Masato Funaki in the original Japanese version of the anime and by Greg Eagles in the English dub.

=== Fracciónes ===
The following are known Fracciónes who are associated with the Espadas and are listed in order by their number ranks:

==== Shawlong Koufang ====
Arrancar 11 Shawlong Koufang (シャウロン・クーファン, Shauron Kūfan; romanized as Shawlong Quofang in the Japanese media) is one of Grimmjow's five Fraccións. In his early life, Shawlong was an Adjuchas-class Menos with a knight-like mask who was the apparent leader of a small group of Menos consisting of himself, Edorad Leones, Nakeem Grindina, Yylfordt Grantz, and Di Roy Rinker. He and his group met Grimmjow one day and took him into his group as their "king." Shawlong and his Menos allies hunted other Hollows in an attempt to become Vasto-Lorde Hollows. When nothing happened after each hunt, Shawlong and the others had Grimmjow eat a part of them to maintain their current forms. Many years later, Shawlong and those that were associated became Fraccións of Grimmjow when Sousuke Aizen took over Hueco Mundo. Shawlong and the others accompanied Grimmjow to Karakura Town. Shawlong and Nakeem ended up fighting Tōshirō Hitsugaya and Rangiku Matsumoto with Shawlong fighting the captain.

His Zanpakutō is Tijereta (五鋏蟲(ティヘレタ), Tihereta; Spanish for "Earwig", Japanese for "Five-Pincered Insect") which looks like a standard katana with a guard shaped like to oval with a gap going down the middle and hollow corners. When released, Shawlong grows armor that covers his arms and upper chest, while his hands transform into long claws and his mask extends down to cover the left side of his face, while the part of his mask fragment, extending out to his right, becomes a claw-tipped tail. Upon releasing his limiter, Tōshirō Hitsugaya manages to freeze Shawlong in ice which then shatters.

Shawlong is voiced by Hideyuki Tanaka in the original Japanese version of the anime and by Michael McConnohie in the English dub.

==== Edorad Leones ====
Arrancar 13 Edorad Leones (エドラド・リオネス, Edorado Rionesu; romanized as Edrad Liones in the Japanese media) is one of Grimmjow's five Fraccións. In his early life, Edorad was an Adjuchas-class Menos who was the apparent leader of a small group of Menos under Shawlong Koufang before they met Grimmjow one day and accept him as their "king." Edorad and his Menos allies hunted other Hollows in an attempt to become Vasto-Lorde Hollows. When nothing happened after each hunt, Edorad and the others had Grimmjow eat a part of them to maintain their current forms. Many years later, Edorad and those that were associated became Fraccións of Grimmjow when Sousuke Aizen took over Hueco Mundo. Shawlong and the others accompanied Grimmjow to Karakura Town. Edorad encountered Ikkaku Madarame and Yumichika Ayasegawa. Before fighting him, he sensed that Di Roy Linker was killed.

His Zanpakutō is Volcánica (火山獣(ボルカニカ), Borukanika; Spanish for "Volcanic", Japanese for "Volcanic Beast") which looks like a regular katana, but with a hexagonal-shaped guard and a slightly-longer hilt. When released, his mask reforms into wings on both sides of his head while his arms become gigantic with his shoulders growing large extensions. He also has the ability to use fire attacks. Edorad later falls in battle against Ikkaku Madarame and states that he is glad to know Ikkaku's name.

Edorad is voiced by Taiten Kusunoki in the original Japanese version of the anime and by Beau Billingslea in the English dub.

==== Nakeem Grindina ====
Arrancar 14 Nakeem Grindina (ナキーム・グリンディーナ, Nakīmu Gurindīna) is one of Grimmjow's five Fracción. In his early life, Nakeem was an Gillian-class Menos who was a member of Shawlong Koufang's group before they met Grimmjow and took him as their "king". Nakeem and his Menos allies hunted other Hollows in an attempt to become Vasto-Lorde Hollows. When nothing happened after each hunt, Nakeem and the others had Grimmjow eat a part of them to maintain their current forms. Many years later, Nakeem and those that were associated became Fraccións of Grimmjow when Sousuke Aizen took over Hueco Mundo. Nakeem and the others accompanied Grimmjow to Karakura Town. Shawlong and Nakeem ended up fighting Tōshirō Hitsugaya and Rangiku Matsumoto with Shawlong fighting Rangiku. Upon releasing her limiter, Rangiku manages to kill Nakeem.

The name and abilities of his Zanpakutō are unknown.

Nakeem is voiced by Taketora in the original Japanese version of the anime and by J.B. Blanc in the English dub.

==== Ilfort Grantz ====
Arrcancar 15 Ilfort Grantz (イールフォルト・グランツ, Īruforuto Gurantsu; romanized as Yylfordt Granz in the Japanese media) is a member of Grimmjow's fracciónes and the older brother of Szayelaporro Granz. The light novel side story The Spirits are Forever With You reveals Ilfort was originally a general in life who provided Szayelaporro with victims to experiment on before they were devoured by a Menos that manifested from the souls of their victims. Szayelaporro became the dominant personality of the Menos and later extracted Ilfort from his body, with Ilfort reconstituted as a bull-like Adjucha Hollow who ended up serving under Grimmjow. Ilfort accompanied Grimmjow to Karakura Town, facing Renji Abarai and Urahara's group before being obliterated by the former. Szayelaporro would later reveal that he placed insects on Ilfort's body prior to provide him data on Renji's abilities.

Ilfort's zanpakutō is Del Toro (蒼角王子(デルトロ), Derutoro; Spanish for "Of the Bull," kanji translates as "Pale-Horned Prince"). In his Minotaur-like released state, he can walk on four legs and skewer opponents with his horns.

He is voiced by Kōichi Tōchika in the original Japanese version of the anime and by Ezra Weisz in the English dub.

==== Di Roy Rinker ====
Arrancar 16 Di Roy Rinker (ディ・ロイ・リンカー, Di Roi Rinkā) is one of Grimmjow's five Fraccións and is the weakest of the five. In his early life, Di Roy was a worm-type Adjuchas-class Menos with a hammerhead shark-shaped head who was a member the small group of Menos under Shawlong Koufang before they met Grimmjow, Di Roy's attempt to kill the Hollow resulting with a piece of himself devoured and forced to remain in his current state as he continues to aid his Menos allies in hunting other Hollows. Many years later, Di Roy and those that were associated became Fraccións of Grimmjow when Sousuke Aizen took over Hueco Mundo. Di Roy and the others accompanied Grimmjow to Karakura Town. He ended up fighting Rukia Kuchiki. The name and abilities of his Zanpakutō are unknown as he was killed by Rukia before he could activate it.

He is voiced by Takashi Kondō in the original Japanese version of the anime and by Spike Spencer in the English dub.

==== Charlotte Chuhlhourne ====
Charlotte Chuhlhourne (シャルロッテ・クールホーン, Sharurotte Kūruhōn), Arrancar 20, is one of Baraggan's Fracciónes who is a muscular and vain drag queen. Accompanying Baraggan to the fake Karakura Town, Charlotte developed a rivalry with Yumichika Ayasegawa as he overpowered the Soul Reaper in their fight until removing them from view enabled Yumichika to use his Ruri'iro Kujaku to kill the Arrancar. Charlotte expresses respect to Yumechika after learning the Soul Reaper's reasons of not using his zanpakutō in its true form.

During the Wandereich invasion, Charlotte is revived as one of Mayuri's arrancar enforcers during the fight against Giselle Gewelle and her zombified Soul Reaper army before he is defeated by Hitsugaya with Mayuri punishing the arrancar for his arrogance by leaving him half-dead.

A majority of Charlotte's attacks have extremely long names to them and his zanpakutō is a flowerly katana called Reina De Rosas (宮廷薔薇園ノ美女王(レイーナ・デ・ロサス); Reīna de Rosasu; Spanish for "Queen of Roses", Japanese for "Beautiful Queen of the Palace Rose Garden"; Viz "Queen of the Roses"). When released, referring to his state as a "princess", Charlotte becomes a scantily clad version of himself with his ultimate attack being Rosa Blanca (白薔薇ノ刑(ロサ･ブランカ), Rosa Buranka; Spanish for "White Rose", Japanese for "White Rose Punishment") where he complete obscures himself and his opponent within a massive, dark, thorny bush, inside of which a large white rose blooms at the very top.

Charlotte is voiced by Kenta Miyake in the original Japanese version of the anime and by Travis Willingham in English version of the anime and later by Bill Butts in the Thousand-Year Blood War English dub.

==== Abirama Redder ====
Arrancar 22 Abirama Redder (アビラマ・レッダー, Abirama Reddā) is one of Baraggan Louisenbairn's six Fracción and the most violent of the six. When in the fake Karakura Town, Baraggan sends Abirama to target one of the pillars, where he ends up fighting Izuru Kira.

His Zanpakutō is Águila (空戦鷲(アギラ), Agira; Spanish for "Eagle", Japanese for "Sky Battle Eagle"), which resembles a standard-sized red katana with an oval-shaped guard and a protrusion on each of the four sides of the guard. When released, Abirama transforms into a red humanoid eagle. Abirama had the upper hand in this form as it gave him the ability to fly. Kira managed to spring a trap by hitting him with Wabisuke, which makes Abirama too heavy to fly. Kira then proceeds to behead Abirama.

He is voiced by Kazunari Tanaka in the original Japanese version and by Benjamin Diskin in the English dub.

==== Findorr Calius ====
Arrancar 24 Findorr Calius (フィンドール・キャリアス, Findōru Kyariasu) is one of Baraggan Louisenbairn's six Fracción. When in the fake Karakura Town, Baraggan sends Findorr to target one of the pillars. He ends up fighting Shūhei Hisagi. During the battle, Findorr chisels parts of his mask off to increase his power.

His Zanpakutō is Pinza Aguda (蟄刀流断(ピンサグーダ), Pinsagūda; Spanish for "Sharp Pincer", Japanese for "Crab Sword Cutting Current"), which resembles a standard-sized katana with a pink handle and a guard that resembles a Spanish épée or rapier. When released, Findorr transforms into a humanoid crab. After a fierce battle, Findorr is killed by Hisagi.

He is voiced by Takashi Kondō in the original Japanese version and by Travis Willingham in the English dub.

==== Choe Neng Pow ====
Arrancar 25 Choe Neng Poww (チーノン・ポウ, Chīnon Pō; romanized as Choe Neng Pow in the Japanese media) is the largest of Baraggan Louisenbairn's six Fracción. Like the others, Choe Neng Poww is loyal to Baraggan and treats him as his god. When in the fake Karakura Town, Baraggan sends Choe to target one of the pillars. He ends up fighting Madarame Ikkaku, succeeds in defeating him and destroys the pillar. Before Choe Neng Poww can finish off Ikkaku, Sajin Komamura takes over the fight while Tetsuzaemon places some poles on the ground to keep the real Karakura Town from materializing.

His Zanpakutō is Calderón (巨腕鯨(カルデロン), Karuderon; Spanish for "Pilot Whale", Japanese for "Giant-Armed Whale"), which resembles a wakizashi (resembling more to a pocket knife in proportion to the massive Arrancar) and is stored up his sleeve. When released, Choe's entire body swells up into a giant with whale-like features going from his chin to his chest. Sajin Komamura unleashes his Bankai, which he uses to crush Choe.

He is voiced by Hiroshi Shirokuma in the original Japanese version and by Jamieson Price in the English dub.

==== Ggio Vega ====
Arrancar 26 Ggio Vega (ジオ・ヴェガ, Jio Vega) is the shortest of Baraggan Louisenbairn's six Fracción. Following the death of Charlotte Chuhlhourne, Abirama Redder, Findorr Calius, and Choe Neng Poww, Ggio Vega and Nirgge Parduoc end up fighting Suì-Fēng and Marechiyo Omaeda, with Ggio fighting Soi Fon.

His Zanpakutō is Tigre Estoque (虎牙迅風(ティグレストーク), Tiguresutōku; Spanish for "Tiger Rapier", Japanese for "Tiger Fang Swift Wind"). Its hilt resembles a normal katana with a light yellow handle and silver oval-shaped guard with slits going down the middle of both ends. When released, Ggio Vega becomes more tiger-like. Before he can do anything in his Tigre Estoque El Sable (虎牙迅風(ティグレストーク)・大劍(エルサブル), Tiguresutōku Erusaburu; Spanish for "Tiger Rapier, The Saber", Japanese for "Tiger Fang Swift Wind Great Sword") form, he is killed by Soi Fon with Suzumebachi's (her Zanpakutō) Death in Two Steps ability.

He is voiced by Tetsuya Kakihara in the original Japanese version and by Tony Oliver in the English dub.

==== Nirgge Parduoc ====
Arrancar 27 Nirgge Parduoc (ニルゲ・パルドゥック, Niruge Parudukku) is one of Baraggan Louisenbairn's six Fracción. Following the deaths of Charlotte Chuhlhourne, Abirama Redder, Findorr Calius, and Choe Neng Poww, Nirgge Parduoc and Ggio Vega ended up fighting Soi Fon and Marechiyo Omaeda with Nirgge fighting Omaeda.

His Zanpakutō is Mamut (巨象兵(マムート), Mamūto; Spanish for "Mammoth", Japanese for "Giant Elephant Soldier"). It resembles an average katana with a silver oval-like guard and a light-green handle. When released, Nirgge resembles a green humanoid woolly mammoth with enhanced strength and an extendable trunk. Omaeda manages to knock out Nirgge with his Zanpakutō. When Omaeda celebrates his assumed victory, Nirgge wraps his trunk around him and gets knocked out by a rock that fell when Soi Fon was thrown into a nearby building.

He is voiced by Daisuke Matsuoka in the original Japanese version and by Kyle Hebert in the English dub.

==== Tesla Lindocruz ====
Nnoitora's sole Fracción is Arrancar 50 Tesla Lindocruz (テスラ・リンドクルズ, Tesura Rindokuruzu; romanized as Tesra Lindocruz in the Japanese media) who idolizes Nnoitora and models himself in Nnoitora's image despite Nnoitora's regular abuse toward him. Tesla first appeared where he accompanied Nnoitora into attacking Yasutora Sado. When Nnoitora attacked a weakened Ichigo and Grimmjow, Tesla seized Orihime and told her not to interfere or he will break her hair clips. Tesla also manages to find where Nelliel was hiding subsequently attacking the spot where she was and revealing her presence to Nnoitora.

Tesla's Zanpakutō is Verruga (牙鎧士(ベルーガ), Berūga; Spanish for "Wart," Japanese for "Tusked Armored Warrior") which takes the form of a rapier with a chakram embedded into the blade just above the hilt, and spikes on the hilt rim. When it is released, Tesla becomes a large warthog-like creature with enhanced strength. In this form, Tesla managed to knock down Ichigo and was cut down by Kenpachi Zaraki before he can finish Ichigo off. Tesla was later seen crying when Nnoitra is killed by Kenpachi.

Tesla is voiced by Yuichi Nakamura in the original Japanese version and by Keith Silverstein in the English dub.

==== Tres Bestias ====
The Tres Bestias (3獣神(トレス・ベスティア), Toresu Besutia; Spanish for "Three Beasts", kanji translate as "Three Beast Goddesses") is a trio of female arrancars who serve as Tier Halibel's Fracciónes. It is composed of the deer-themed Arrancar 54 Emilou Apacci (エミルー・アパッチ, Emirū Apatchi), the lion-themed Arrancar 55 Francheska Mila Rose (フランチェスカ・ミラ・ローズ, Furanchesuka Mira Rōzu), and the snake-themed arrancar 56 Cyan Sung-Sun (シィアン・スンスン, Shīan Sunsun; romanized as Cyan Seong-Seong in the Japanese media). Although the three are loyal to Halibel and dangerous as a group, their relationship with each other is dysfunctional with occasional insults and death threats. They were Adjuchas in their early lives when saved by Halibel, the three joining her cause to protect themselves from male hollows that prey on them. Some time after Halibel's audience with Baraggan, the Tres Bestias tried to help Halibel when her base was attacked by a hammerhead arrancar who wanted to kill their leader for her act against him when he was a hollow in Baraggan's court. Though the Tres Bestias were easily defeated, they were saved by Sousuke Aizen.

Apacci's Zanpakutō is Cierva (碧鹿闘女(シエルバ), Shieruba; Spanish for "Doe," Japanese for "Blue Deer Battle Girl"), which is actually the collars she wears over her wrists. When released, Apacci becomes more deer-like with brown fur, antlers, and hooves in the place of her feet. Mila Rose's Zanpakutō is Leona (金獅子将(レオーナ), Reōna; Spanish for "Lioness", Japanese for "Gold Lion General"), which resembles a broad sword instead of the regular katana. When released, Mila Rose resembles an armored Amazon warrior with lion-shaped fangs and a lion-like mane. Sung-Sun's Zanpakutō is Anaconda (白蛇姫(アナコンダ), Anakonda; Spanish for "Anaconda", Japanese for "White Snake Princess"), which resembles a sai that is concealed in her sleeve. When released, Sung-Sun resembles a Nāga. The Tres Bestias can also utilize their rarely used ability Quimera Parca, sacrificing their arms as materials to create the chimeric hollow Ayon.

After watching Ichigo's fight with Grimmjow, the Tres Bestias accompany Halibel to fake Karakura Town, where they end up fighting Rangiku Matsumoto until Momo Hinamori arrives to help her. Seeing the battle turn against them, they resort to summoning Ayon to defeat the Soul Reapers and most of the lieutenants who come to their aid. After Ayon is slain by Genryūsai Shigekuni Yamamoto, who refuses to kill the Tres Bestias out of respect, they are knocked out and severely wounded by Yamamoto's flame when they make an attempt on his life. After the battle, Orihime heals their wounds as they and Halibel are allowed to return to Hueco Mundo where the Tres Bestias become enforcers of the new order of Hueco Mundo founded by their leader. But after Wandenreich took over Hueco Mundo and imprison Halibel, the Tres Bestias refuse to submit to the invaders and remained adamant about their resolve while fighting Kirge Opie as he defeated them. Their attempt to rejoin the fight by summoning Ayon during Ichigo Kurosaki's fight with Kirge backfires when the Quincy asborbs the creature and stabs Apacci with Mila Rose and Sung-Sun getting her to safety. Before Quilge can kill them, Sado and Orihime, Ichigo stops him and they continue their battle.

Apacci is voiced by Kumi Sakuma in the original Japanese version of the anime and by Megan Hollingshead in the English dub.

Mila Rose is voiced by Sayori Ishizuka in the original Japanese version of the anime. In the English dub, she is voiced by Erin Fitzgerald in earlier seasons and by Shara Kirby in Bleach: Thousand-Year Blood War.

Sung-Sun is voiced by Ayumi Sena in the original Japanese version of the anime and by Karen Strassman in the English dub.

===== Ayon =====
Ayon (アヨン) is a Chimera Hollow being created by the Tres Bestias via the technique Quimera Parca (混獣神(キメラ・パルカ), Kimera Paruka; Spanish for "Sparing Chimera", Japanese for "Mixed-Beast God") by combining their severed left arms (which turn into energy in the anime) to create a hollow-like being that combines all of their physical attributes. Its appearance gives it a humanoid appearance, deer's hooves and skull-like mask, a lion's mane, and a snake tail complete with a large mouth hidden in the mane under the skull-like mask. Ayon has an ability called "El Martillo" (怪槌(エル・マルティージョ), Eru Marutījo; Spanish for "The Hammer", Japanese for "Spectral Hammer"), where Ayon's size and strength increase with his anger. Though acting on his own volition, Ayon expresses concern for his creators. First summoned to the Fake Karakura Town, Ayon easily takes out Rangiku Matsumoto, Momo Hinamori, Tetsuzaemon Iba, and Shūhei Hisagi single handed, until Captain Yamamoto joins the fray to use his Shikai to destroy the beast.

Another Ayon is later summoned to fight Kirge Opie after he defeated the Tres Bestias alone, landing a blow on the Quincy as he was fighting Ichigo. Although Ayon pummels Kirge mercilessly, Kirge shrugs off the injuries and absorbs Ayon soon after.

Ayon's vocal effects are provided by Jōji Nakata in the original Japanese version of the anime and by Matthew Mercer in the English dub.

==== Pesche Guatiche ====
Pesche Guatiche (ペッシェ・ガティーシェ, Pesshe Gatīshe), Arrancar 41, is a seemingly harmless, humanoid Arrancar whose body is covered in a sort of light armor, complete with a mask resembling an insectoid head with a large pair of mandibles. His hollow hole is positioned near his stomach. He was once Nelliel's Fracción, He accompanied the amnesiac Nel in exile after his original mask fragment was forcibly removed by Nnoitra Gilga, intend on keeping her safe. Years later, when Nel accompanies Ichigo into Las Noches, Pesche follows her but loses her. Attempting to find Nel, Pesche ends up following Uryū Ishida, having mistaken him for Ichigo Kurosaki (and later on uses it just to irritate him), which upsets him because Uryū's appearance leads him to believe that he is the weakest of the group. Pesche possesses an ability he calls "Infinite Slick" (無限の滑走(インフィナイト・スリック), Infinaito Surikku), in which he sprays his saliva at an object, severely reducing its friction. Contrary to its name, it is of limited supply. He carries an energy sword he calls Ultima (究極(ウルティマ), Urutima; Spanish for "Final," kanji translates as "Ultimate") inside his loincloth, but it is unclear if it is his zanpakutō. He and Dondochakka are capable of combining their Cero attacks together to create an even more powerful attack they have named Cero Sincrético (融合虚閃(セロ・シンクレティコ), Sero Shinkuretiko). The only time it has been shown, Szayelaporro Grantz renders the attack ineffective, making the full extent of its power unclear.

Pesche is voiced by Takehito Koyasu in the original Japanese version of the anime and by Michael P. Greco in the English dub.

==== Dondochakka Bilstin ====
Dondochakka Bilstin (ドンドチャッカ・ビルスタン, Dondochakka Birusutan; romanized as Dondachacka Birstanne in the Japanese media), Arrancar 42, is a large, spotted, humanoid arrancar with a tiki-style mask and compound eyes. Despite his menacing appearance, he is prone to tearful outbursts at the slightest provocation, usually when he is worried about something. Speaking in a stereotypical Bronx accent in the English version, he frequently inserts the phrase "You know what I'm saying?" (ヤンス, yansu) in his speech. He was once Nelliel's Fracción, He accompanied the amnesiac Nel in exile after his original mask fragment was forcibly removed by Nnoitra Gilga, intend on keeping her safe. Years later, when Nel accompanies Ichigo Kurosaki and his friends, Dondochakka follows her into Las Noches where he loses her. Attempting to find Nel, Dondochakka ends up following Renji Abarai, whom he frequently irritates with his clumsiness and emotional outbursts. Dondochakka possesses numerous insect spirits within his stomach and he can spit these spirits out at will as allies in combat. In addition, he carries a kanabō inside his stomach, but it is unclear if this is his zanpakutō. Seventeen months after Ichigo defeats Aizen, Dondochakka is captured by the Wandenreich after they took over Hueco Mundo.

Dondochakka is voiced by Daisuke Gōri in the original Japanese version of the anime and by Pete Sepenuk in the English dub.

==== Lumina and Verona ====
Lumina (ルミーナ, Rumīna) and Verona (ベローナ, Berōna) are two short and obese Arrancars of unknown number ranks who are one of Szayelaporro's Fracción. They first appeared to notify Szayelaporro of Aaroniero Arruruerie's death. After Szayelaporro was heavily injured from Renji and Uryu's attacks, Szayelaporro devoured Lumina to heal himself while telling a saddened Vernoa that he will make her another Lumina. Verona's current status alongside Szayelaporro's other Fracción are unknown.

Lumina and Verona are voiced by Kōzō Shioya in the original Japanese version of the anime and by Derek Stephen Prince and Wendee Lee in the English dub.

==== Medazeppi ====
Medazeppi (メダゼピ, Medazepi) is one of Szayelaporro's Fracción of an unknown number rank and the largest of his servants. When Szayelaporro becomes bored with Renji, he sends in Medazeppi to finish the job. When Renji gets stuck in the debris, Medazeppi plans to finish him off only to be killed by Uryu.

Medazeppi is voiced by Daisuke Matsuoka in the original Japanese version of the anime and by Richard Epcar in the English dub.

=== Other Arrancars ===
The following arrancars have never received a position as, and are not direct subordinates of, an Espada. They are listed in order of their number ranks:

==== Iceringer Wernarl ====
Iceringer Wernarl (アイスリンガー・ウェルナール, Aisuringā Werunāru; romanized as Aisslinger Wernarr in the Japanese media) is the 17th Arrancar in Sousuke Aizen's army and one of the gatekeepers of Las Noches.

The name of his Zanpakutō is unknown, but Aisslinger always has it in his released state. In this form, he has four arms protruding from underneath his cloak. He and Demoura Zodd ended up fighting Ichigo Kurosaki, Yasutora Sado, and Uryu Ishida when they were on a mission to rescue Orihime. He is defeated by Uryu Ishida. He and Demoura are killed when the room they are in collapses.

He is voiced by Eiji Takemoto in the original Japanese version of the anime and by Travis Willingham in the English dub.

==== Demoura Zodd ====
Demoura Zodd (デモウラ・ゾッド, Demōra Zoddo) is the 18th Arrancar in Sousuke Aizen army and one of the gatekeepers of Las Noches. He and Aisslinger ended up fighting Ichigo Kurosaki, Yasutora Sado, and Uryu Ishida when they were on a mission to rescue Orihime. He was defeated by Yasutora Sado. Demoura and Aisslinger are killed when the room they are in collapses.

He is voiced by Hajime Iijima in the original Japanese version of the anime and by J.B. Blanc in the English dub.

==== Loly Aivirrne & Menoly Mallia ====
Loly Aivirrne (ロリ・アイヴァーン, Rori Aivān) and Menoly Mallia (メノリ・マリア, Menori Maria) are a pair of female arrancars, Arrancar 33 and 34 respectively, that antagonize Orihime Inoue during the "Hueco Mundo" and "Fake Karakura Town" arcs. Loly, who hates Orihime out of both envy and later fearful prejudice, appears as an arrogant young woman with black hair tied in pigtails, a short schoolgirl-themed skirt, and the remains of her mask surround her left eye socket. The remains of Menoly's mask surrounds her right eye socket, and she appears to be more reasonable and willing to cope with her jealousy than to risk her life by making trouble.

Loly's Zanpakutō is Escolopendra (百刺毒娼(エスコロペンドラ), Esukoropendora; Spanish for "Centipede," kanji translates as "Hundred Poisonous Stings") which takes the form of a small dagger with a curved guard. When released, Loly gains centipede-like appendages on her arms which erode everything they touch. The name and abilities of Menoly's Zanpakutō are unknown.

Serving Sousuke Aizen personally, Loly and Menoly were assigned to guard the room Orihime was placed in, the two expressing jealousy of his interest in Orihime. Taking advantage of her rescuers' distraction, Loly and Menoly use the moment to put Orihime in her place. However, when Orihime stood up to them, Loly took it personally and was about to kill her when Grimmjow arrived and mortally wounded Menoly while beating Loly to an inch of her life. However, Orihime used her power to heal the two with Loly's jealousy becoming fearful prejudice. Though Menoly was reluctant to go through with it once Aizen revealed the girl outlived her usefulness, Loli was bent on killing Orihime in the most tormenting way possible during Ichigo's fight with Ulquiorra. However, the sudden arrival of Yammy, who is denied from teaming up with Ulquiorra, results in Menoly being knocked into a pillar. After being healed again by Orihime, deciding to fight Yammy so not to feel obligated, Loly releases her Zanpakutō with the intent to kill him and Ulquiorra. However, Loly is defeated and thrown through the tower wall while being saved by one of Uryū's arrows.

Following the Wandenreich's conquest of Hueco Mundo, Loly and Menoly allowed themselves to be captured so they can take a shot at Kirge Opie. But the assassination plot failed and the two are brutally beaten by Kirge's subordinates with orders for them not to be killed. However, though Loly was mortified by it, she and Menoly were placed in Orihime's care.

Loly and Menoly are voiced respectively by Hana Takeda and Hitomi Harada in the original Japanese version of the anime and by Colleen O'Shaughnessey and Wendee Lee in the English dub.

==== Rudbornn Chelute ====
Arrancar 61 Rudbornn Chelute (ルドボーン, Rudobōn) is the bull-masked leader of the Exequias (葬討部隊(エクセキアス), Ekusekiasu; Spanish for "Funeral Rites", kanji translates as "Funerary Attacking Force"), a group responsible for dealing with rebels and intruders in Las Noches. Unlike most arrancars, his face is completely hidden by his mask. He and his subordinates clean up after each battle, collecting data for Szayelaporro Grantz before killing any survivors. He was revealed in the light novels as a former subordinate of Baraggan who aspired to remake Hueco Mundo into a stable nation.

He carries a Zanpakutō with the name Arbol (髑髏樹(アルボラ), Arubora; Spanish for "Tree," kanji translates as "Skull Tree"), which in his released state grants him tree limbs that twist around his body, adorned with skulls at the tips. Rudbornn is capable of balancing on top of these tree limbs. From these branches, Rudbornn gains the ability to generate full-bodied minions with skulls for masks, which he refers to as his Calaveras (カラベラス, Karaberasu; Spanish for "Skull"). These calaveras apparently comprise the entirety of the Exequias, thereby making Rudbornn the only real Exequias member. Rudbornn has expressed disappointment and regret that he was unable to achieve the role of Espada, despite his powerful ability. Regardless, he expresses great pride and confidence in the Espadas that Aizen has chosen and his own ability to create an endless army of soldiers.

Rudbornn carries out his duties for Szayelaporro by killing off two of the Privaron Espadas after they lose their respective fights and was forced to withdraw from killing the third when Retsu Unohana appears. Later, he and his Calaveras attempt to prevent Ichigo Kurosaki from reaching Orihime Inoue and Ulquiorra Schiffer, only to find himself fighting Rukia Kuchiki. Despite overwhelming her with his Calaveras, Rudbornn is subsequently defeated when the distraction by Yasutora Sado and Renji Abarai allowed Rukia to use her shikai to encase him in ice before being punched by an enraged Yammy.

The light novels reveal Rudbornn survived Yammy's punch as he later sees his dreams of Hueco Mundo realized through Tier.

Rudbornn is voiced by Taro Yamaguchi in the original Japanese version of the anime. In the English dub, he is voiced by Michael Lindsay in episode 153, Doug Erholtz in episode 157, Benjamin Diskin in episode 195, and Dan Woren in episode 196 onwards.

==== Wonderweiss Mergera ====
Arrancar 77 Wonderweiss Mergera (ワンダーワイス・マルジェラ, Wandāwaisu Marujera; romanized as Wonderweiß Margela in the Japanese media) is a modified arrancar with reiatsu density comparable to the current Espadas. The remains of his hollow mask resembles a small crown on his head. Modified by Aizen using the Hōgyoku as a weapon to render Yamamoto's Zanpakutō completely useless, the process removed all forms of Wonderweiss' rationality, his memory retention, speech, and intelligence. As a result, despite being all-powerful, Wonderweiss is intellectually disabled. He possesses a level of hostility, firing a bala towards Kisuke Urahara during their battle, but quickly reverts to his regular state after doing so. Kaname Tōsen states that Wonderweiss (like himself) is a pure being, but wonders whether he is pure good or evil. He follows Tōsen everywhere when possible and is hostile to what he perceives as Tōsen's enemies.

Wonderweiss' own zanpakutō Extinguir (滅火皇子(エスティンギル), Esutingiru; Spanish for "To Extinguish," kanji translates as "Prince of Extinguished Flames") resembles a purple-colored claymore or zweihander. In his released form, Wonderweiss appears to have giant shoulders and thighs, skinny limbs, and a large crown-like headpiece. Upon contact he instantly extinguishes and absorbs Ryūjin Jakka's flames into his body. Furthermore, his strength is highly augmented, he is capable of instant-regeneration, and can produce numerous arms from his shoulders and back that can extend to great lengths.

Shortly after his creation, Wonderweiss is sent to the human world with the Espadas Grimmjow, Luppi, and Yammy to engage and distract the Soul Reapers while Ulquiorra captures Orihime. He later appears during Aizen's assault on Karakura Town leading a massive hollow called Hooler, impaling Jushiro Ukitake with his bare hands, and then freeing Halibel from Tōshirō Hitsugaya's ice prison with a sonic scream. Despite engaging Kensei in battle after eventually overwhelming Mashiro when she killed Hooler, Wonderweiss reappears to save Aizen from Yamamoto's suicide attempt and engages the Captain-Commander in a hand-to-hand battle. He is ultimately killed and shattered to pieces by Yamamoto's Sōkotsu technique; however, having sealed all Ryūjin Jakka's flames into his body prior to their fight, Wonderweiss' corpse explodes and Yamamoto is forced to throw himself onto Wonderweiss' body to prevent the release of the absorbed flames from incinerating the entire town.

Wonderweiss is voiced by Hisayoshi Suganuma in the original Japanese version of the anime. In the English dub, he is voiced by Christopher Corey Smith until episode 278 and by Michael Sinterniklaas in later episodes.

==== Cien Granz ====
Arrancar 100 Cien Granz (シエンㆍグランツ, Shien Gurantsu), the number tattooed on his eye, is an Arrancar that appears in the light novels as the main antagonist of the side story "Spirits Are Forever With You". He was created by an Arrancar medic named Roka Paramia as a clone of Szayelaporro Granz prior to him purging Ilfort Grantz's essence from his body, making Cien more violent in personality. He is also an "Espada Number 0", the "10" of his tattoo flakes off through his Resurrección. Cien sought to absorb all trace remains of Syazelaporo and exact revenge on the Soul Society.

Like Syazelaporo, he uses the Zanpakutō Fornicarás (邪淫妃(フォルニカラス), Forunikarasu; Spanish for "You will fornicate," kanji translates as "Lewd Princess") and possesses all of Syazelaporo's abilities. When released and possessing butterfly-like wings, his full reiatsu is unleashed to the point of being nearly unstoppable in battle.

Cien Granz is voiced by Kōsuke Toriumi in the original Japanese version.

==== Patros ====
Patros (パトラス, Patorasu) is a Números of unknown number rank who is exclusive to the anime. He planned to become the King of all Hollows by stealing the Hogyoku only to be intercepted by Ulquiorra Cifer. Patros tries to convince him to join him, but Ulqiorra shows no interest. Upon calling his allies Menis and Aldegor, Patros took down Ulqiorra (which was actually Aizen's Zanpakutō in disguise). Patros makes his way to Kisuke Urahara's shop only to find that Kisuke Urahara wasn't there. Instead, he found Jinta Hanakari, Ururu Tsumgiya, Ririn, Noba, and Kurōdo who ended up engaging him. After Patros dispatches them, he ends up fighting Renji Abarai. Renji releases his limited and then releases his Bankai. Patros releases his Resurrección and their fight gets fierce. With help from Ririn, Noba, and Kurōdo, Renji manages to destroy Patros.

His Zanpakutō Gerifalte (ヘリファルテ, Herifarute; Spanish for "Gyrfalcon") resembles a normal katana with a diamond-shaped guard when sealed. Patro's Gerifalte is like no ordinary Zanpakutō since it is not used like a normal sword in combat. Instead, Patros can fire energy blasts from long range by quickly drawing and resheathing the sword with each attack getting stronger. In its released state, Patros gains body armor, his mask grows all over except for the right side of his head, his right arm turns into a hinge-like copy of his sealed Zanpakutō, and his left arm is the same and opens at the middle to generate yellowish energy blasts.

Patros is voiced by Tetsuo Kanao in the original Japanese version of the anime and by J.B. Blanc in the English dub.

==== Menis ====
Menis (メニス, Menisu) is a Números of unknown number rank who is exclusive to the anime. He and Aldegor worked with Patros in a plot to overthrow Sousuke Aizen. After joining Patros and Aldegor into attacking Ulqiorra Cifer, Menis joins them into heading to Karakura Town. Menis ended up engaging Tōshirō Hitsugaya and Rangiku Matsumoto. After losing the battle, he meets up with Patros before he is frozen and ends up shattering.

His Zanpakutō Erizo (エリッソ, Erisso; Spanish for "Hedgehog") had a green handle with a guard that had a half circle on both sides. When released, Menis grows three segmented tail-like appendages which he attacks with and the remains of his Hollow mask end up covering his face.

He is voiced by Hisafumi Oda in the original Japanese version of the anime and by Michael Sinterniklaas in the English dub.

==== Aldegor ====
Aldegor (アルデゴル, Arudegoru) is a Números of unknown number rank who is exclusive to the anime. He and Menis worked with Patros in a plot to overthrow Sousuke Aizen. After joining Patros and Aldegor into attacking Ulqiorra Cifer, Aldegor joins them into heading to Karakura Town. Aldegor ends up engaging Ikkaku Madarame and Yumichika Ayasegawa. After losing the battle, he meets up with Patros where he dies from his injures.

His Zanpakutō Jabalí (ハバリー, Habarī; Spanish for "Boar") resembles a normal katana but with a long pink handle and a flower patterned guard. When released, Aldegor gains six hinged appendages from his back which are used for attacks and defenses. He can also roll up into a ball to attack at high speeds.

He is voiced by Kenta Miyake in the original Japanese version of the anime and by Phineas Willow in the English dub.

==== Cloning Arrancar ====
The Cloning Arrancar is an anime-exclusive Arrancar of unknown number rank whose consuming of the deceased soul of Yui Toyokawa enables him to create make clones of his original armadillo-like Hollow form that can assume the forms of those he or his clones devour. He first appeared as an Arrancar when he targets the deceased soul of Yui's brother Shōta Toyokawa. The Arrancar gives Tōshirō Hitsugaya's group a hard time before the music of Yui's ocarina allows Hitsugaya to pinpoint the Hollow's location. Though entering his Resurrección state, the Arrancar is knocked into the river prior to being frozen. Rangiku and Shota took the opportunity to kill the Cloning Arrancar. Once the Cloning Arrancar dies, his clones follow suit as Yui and the other consumed souls are freed.

The Cloning Arrancar's Zanpakutō Dientes (ディエンティス, deienteisu; Spanish for "Teeth") is small in comparison to its side. When released, the Cloning Arrancar's arms turn into spike-covered club-like extensions and gains a snake-like creature above him which can act remotely.

He is voiced by Masuo Amada in the Japanese version of the anime and by David Lodge in the English version.

==== Unnamed Female Arrancar ====
The unnamed female Arrancar runs the Giant Hollow Fortress when attacking Karakura Town twice. She fought the Karakura-Raizer team twice. The first time was when the female Arrancar retreated upon being defeated by Chizuru. The second time had her creating Michel to help her. When Michel was slain, she threw her Zanpakutō towards the TV screen which caused damages to her Giant Hollow Fortress.

The unnamed female Arrancar is voiced by Ayumi Fujimura in the original Japanese version and by Colleen O'Shaughnessey in the English dub.

==== Asguiaro Ebern ====
Asguiaro Ebern (アズギアロ・イーバーン, Azugiaro Ībān) is one of the Wandenreich's Arrancar soldiers. Though an Arrancar, Ebern possesses the same abilities as a Quincy with a medallion that can steal the Bankai of a Soul Reaper. After confronting Ichigo with the medallion not having effect, Ebern returns to the Wandenreich's base of operation where he ended up in an argument with Luders Friegen. After killing Luders, the Wandenreich's leader Yhwach kills him for having served his purpose while declaring him as only a foundation stone for their goals.

He is voiced by Wataru Komada in the original Japanese version of anime and by Andreas Beckett in the English dub.

==== Luders Friegen ====
Luders Friegen (リューダス・フリーゲン, Ryūdasu Furīgen) is one of the Wandenreich's Arrancar soldiers. Though an Arrancar, he possed the same abilities of a Quincy. Luders led six Wandenreich soldiers into invading the Seireitei. Before retreating, Luders tells Yamamoto that the Soul Society will be destroyed in five days by the Wandenreich. Upon returning to the Wandenreich base, Luders argues with Ebern until the Wandenreich's leader Yhwach arrives and severs Luders' arm stating that he doesn't like conflict. After a conversation, and Luders having served his purpose, Yhwach kills him.

He is voiced by Daiki Hamano in the original Japanese version of anime and by Mick Lauer in the English dub.

== Reception ==
The hollows of Bleach have received praise from several publications for anime, manga, and other media. Anime News Network praised Kubo's "grasp of character and storytelling" in his creation of hollows who are not "the average monster of the week", but have "strong emotional ties" to their victims. Meanwhile, the later introduced arrancars are described as conceptually interesting.

Of the hollow characters, the Espada character Grimmjow has garnered the most attention, with ActiveAnime describing him as "the most psycho of them all". Additionally, IGN commented that "it's very difficult to take a book seriously when one of its main characters is named "Grimmjow Jeager-Jacques" [sic] but damned if this book doesn't pull it off". In contrast, Anime News Network lamented that the first battle between Ichigo and Grimmjow was "a lumbering, inelegant mess". Grimmjow is also the most popular hollow character with readers of Weekly Shōnen Jump, placing fourth in its fourth Bleach Popularity contest. Ulquiorra, another arrancar character, was voted into tenth place in the same poll, though he had also appeared in the previous poll in twentieth place.

The visual appearances of the hollows in the anime and manga have also received notice from reviewers. The Los Angeles Times compared the early hollows to "the misshapen fossils of unsuccessful dinosaurs". Of the arrancar characters, Yammy is described as a "stereotypical, muscle-bound anime villain", while Ulquiorra is likened to "L from Death Note, with a bone hat and some tear makeup".
