= Bleach (2018 film) =

2018 film by Shinsuke Sato

- Theatrical release poster
- Directed by: Shinsuke Sato
- Written by: Shinsuke Sato; Daisuke Habara
- Based on: Bleach by Tite Kubo
- Produced by: Kazutoshi Wadakura
- Starring: Sota Fukushi; Hana Sugisaki; Ryo Yoshizawa; Erina Mano; Yu Koyanagi; Taichi Saotome; Miyavi; Seiichi Tanabe; Masami Nagasawa; Yōsuke Eguchi
- Music by: Yutaka Yamada
- Production companies: Warner Bros. Pictures Japan; Cine Bazar
- Distributed by: Warner Bros. Pictures (Japan); Netflix (Worldwide)
- Release dates: July 20, 2018 (Japan); July 28, 2018 (US); September 14, 2018 (Worldwide)
- Running time: 108 minutes
- Country: Japan
- Language: Japanese
- Box office: ¥493,052,600 ($3,114,357)

Bleach (also known onscreen as Bleach: The Soul Reaper Agent Arc) is a 2018 Japanese urban fantasy action film directed by Shinsuke Sato, and based on Tite Kubo's manga series Bleach. The film stars Sota Fukushi as the main protagonist, Ichigo Kurosaki. It was released in Japan on July 20, 2018. The film had its American premiere on July 28, 2018, at the New York Japan Cuts Festival in New York City. The film was released worldwide on Netflix on September 14, 2018.

== Plot ==
Ichigo Kurosaki is a fifteen-year-old high school student who lives in Karakura Town with his father, Isshin, and younger twin sisters, Karin and Yuzu. He also has the ability to see ghosts, a talent that attracts the attention of a katana-wielding young woman in a black kimono. She introduces herself as Rukia Kuchiki while explaining to Ichigo that she is a Soul Reaper, a psychopomp who guides the departed to the Soul Society and purify those who remained among the living and transformed into monstrous beings called Hollows. At that time, a Hollow that Rukia was hunting named Fishbone D attacks Ichigo's home after sensing his high spiritual energy. Rukia is wounded in the attempt to protect the Kurosaki family and forced to transfer her powers into a desperate Ichigo so he can defeat the Hollow as a Soul Reaper. After discovering Rukia has enrolled in his class the following day, Ichigo learns that she has lost her power and he must serve as her substitute until he amassed enough Reiyoku energy from defeating Hollows to transfer Rukia's powers back to her.

Meanwhile, Soul Reaper captain Byakuya Kuchiki, Rukia's older brother, sends his lieutenant Renji Abarai to retrieve her. A brief altercation between Ichigo and Renji occurs before the latter is driven off by arrows fired by Ichigo's classmate Uryū Ishida. Uryū reveals himself to be of a tribe of spiritually aware humans called Quincies, who were nearly wiped out by the Soul Reapers as they obliterate Hollows rather than purify them. Uryū declares himself an enemy of all Soul Reapers as he challenges Ichigo to a Hollow hunting competition, having deliberately summoned the monsters to Karakura Town.

While Ichigo and Rukia are fighting a Hollow, Hexapodus, they are confronted by Renji and Byakuya. After Renji defeats Ichigo, Byakuya scolds Rukia for having broken the Soul Society's laws by giving Ichigo her powers while giving her an ultimatum: either extract her Reiryoku from Ichigo or return to the Soul Society to be trialed and punished accordingly. As the former choice would result in Ichigo's death since he had not amassed the ideal amount for his survival, Rukia resigns herself for punishment. But Ichigo stops her at the last minute and makes a deal with Byakuya, to purify the infamous Hollow Grand Fisher to gain enough Reiryoku for a non-fatal transfer.

As Ichigo vigorously training for the confrontation catches the interest of his classmates Yasutora Sado and Orihime Inoue, he learns that Grand Fisher was the being who killed his mother Masaki Kurosaki when he was a child. While visiting Masaki's grave, Karin and Yuzu are attacked by Grand Fisher. Ichigo is able to free his sisters before taking Grand Fisher on in a highly destructive fight and defeating him with Uryū's support, only for the two to be ambushed and Uryū injured by Renji, who with Byakuya decided to renege on their deal. Though Ichigo manages to overpower Renji, Byakuya steps in and defeats Ichigo with overwhelming pace. Rukia intervenes, convincing Byakuya to spare Ichigo as she extracts her Reiryoku while parting ways with him. The next day, due to the Soul Society's influence, everyone in Karakura Town has forgotten Rukia and everyone thinks the damage to the town from the battle with Grand Fisher was caused by a tornado. However, Ichigo sees a note Rukia had left in his book and seemingly regains his memories.

== Cast ==
- Sota Fukushi as Ichigo Kurosaki, A high school student who becomes a Soul Reaper after receiving powers from an injured Soul Reaper.
- Hana Sugisaki as Rukia Kuchiki, A Soul Reaper who is forced to forfeit her powers after being injured while hunting the Hollow, Fishbone D.
- Erina Mano as Orihime Inoue, Ichigo's classmate who has a crush on him.
- Ryo Yoshizawa as Uryū Ishida, A Quincy who is Ichigo's classmate.
- Yu Koyanagi as Yasutora "Chad" Sado, Ichigo's classmate.
- Taichi Saotome as Renji Abarai, A Soul Reaper lieutenant who is sent to retrieve Rukia.
- Miyavi as Byakuya Kuchiki, A Soul Reaper who is Rukia's older brother and a Captain of 6th Division in the Soul Reapers.
- Seiichi Tanabe as Kisuke Urahara, The mysterious owner of Urahara Shop.
- Yōsuke Eguchi as Isshin Kurosaki, Ichigo's father.
- Masami Nagasawa as Masaki Kurosaki, Ichigo's mother who was killed years prior by the Hollow, Grand Fisher.
- Miyu Ando as Karin Kurosaki, one of the twin daughters of Isshin and Masaki Kurosaki and Ichigo's younger twin sister
- Kokoro Hirasawa as Yuzu Kurosaki, one of the twin daughters of Isshin and Masaki Kurosaki and Ichigo's younger twin sister

=== English Dubbed Cast ===
- Johnny Yong Bosch as Ichigo Kurosaki
- Cassandra Lee Morris as Rukia Kuchiki
- Stephanie Sheh as Orihime Inoue
- Derek Stephen Prince as Uryū Ishida
- Kaiji Tang as Yasutora "Chad" Sado
- Richard Cansino as Renji Abarai
- Greg Chun as Byakuya Kuchiki
- Doug Erholtz as Kisuke Urahara
- Keith Silverstein as Isshin Kurosaki
- Ellyn Stern as Masaki Kurosaki
- Janice Kawaye as Karin Kurosaki and Yuzu Kurosaki

== Production ==
=== Development ===
In 2008, Tite Kubo stated that he wished to make Bleach an experience that can be found only by reading manga, dismissing ideas of creating any live-action film adaptations of the series. When the film adaptation was announced, however, Kubo decided to be involved with its production to ensure its faithfulness to the manga and anime, so that both old and new fans may enjoy it. He also stated that his only concern was the color of Ichigo's hair, which in the manga and anime is a bright shade of orange. He said, "If that color is in the live-action movie, it'd be strange, so I wonder what they're going to do!" Regarding what fans could expect in the live-action adaptation, Sota Fukushi, who portrayed Ichigo, stated that the film would feature "the monstrous Hollows, otherworldly Soul Society, and destructive Zanpakuto sword-fighting techniques".

The 10th issue of the 2018 Weekly Shōnen Jump magazine released the visual for Rukia Kuchiki, revealing that Hana Sugisaki would portray the character. In March 2018, the film's official Twitter account revealed that Uryū Ishida, Renji Abarai and Byakuya Kuchiki would be portrayed by Ryo Yoshizawa, Taichi Saotome and Miyavi respectively. In May 2018, the film's official Twitter account revealed an additional cast that included Erina Mano, Yu Koyanagi, Seiichi Tanabe, Yōsuke Eguchi and Masami Nagasawa, portraying Orihime Inoue, Yasutora "Chad" Sado, Kisuke Urahara, Isshin Kurosaki and Masaki Kurosaki respectively.

On October 7, 2018, Johnny Yong Bosch, voice actor for the anime revealed that there was an English dub produced for the film, and that he would be reprising his role as Ichigo Kurosaki.

== Music ==
The film's score was written by composer Yutaka Yamada. The film also features songs by Alexandros, "Mosquito Bite" and "Milk". The soundtrack was distributed by Crown Tokuma Music Distribution on July 25, 2018.

Bleach (Original Motion Picture Soundtrack)
No.	Title	Length
1.	"序 -BLEACH-"
2.	"魂 -KONPAKU-"
3.	"虚 -HOLLOW-"
4.	"骸 -GIGAI-"
5.	"橙 -ORANGE-"
6.	"修 -TRAINING-"
7.	"斬 -ZANPAKUTO- / David Vives"
8.	"友 -NAKAMA-"
9.	"威 -BYAKUYA-"
10.	"界 -SOCIETY- / Castro Satoshi"
11.	"想 -MASAKI-"
12.	"心 -ISSHIN-"
13.	"掟 -OKITE-"
14.	"志 -KOKOROZASHI-"
15.	"刀 -FORCE-"
16.	"護 -ICHIGO-"
17.	"絆 -RUKIA-"
18.	"書 -TEGAMI-"
19.	"命 -BLEACH-"

== Release ==
=== Marketing ===
After months of speculation from fans and critics, paired with months of silence from Warner Bros. Japan, a teaser trailer was released online on July 6, 2017, also revealing a poster for the movie in the process. On January 1, 2018, to hype the movie's release in Summer of 2018, to commemorate the beginning of the new year and to thank the support of the fans of the anime and movie project, a short message was shared via the movie's official Twitter account.

On February 5, 2018, it was revealed that the movie would premiere on July 20, 2018, in Japan. A teaser trailer was released on February 21, 2018, which was praised for its faithful adaptation of the series' first chapter. In April 2018, the first official trailer was released, which also revealed the film's theme song by Alexandros, titled "Mosquito Bite". In June 2018, Warner Bros. Japan released the final trailer for the film, which confirmed that the film's main antagonist is the Hollow Grand Fisher.

=== Home media ===
Bleach was released on Netflix on September 14, 2018.

== Reception ==
=== Box office ===
As of August 7, 2018, Bleach has grossed ¥448,895,200 ($2,835,438) in Japan. The filmed opened at #4 on its opening weekend and grossed ¥135 million from Friday to Sunday. On the second weekend, it fell into #5 and grossed an additional ¥64,199,600. In the third weekend, Bleach dropped off the top 10 and earned ¥23,459,400. Overseas, the film grossed $482,325 in China.

=== Critical reception ===
According to the review aggregator website Rotten Tomatoes, 67% of critics have given the film a positive review based on six reviews, with an average rating of 6.1/10. Justine Smith for SciFiNow gave it a positive review with a consensus that "While clearly made for a dedicated fanbase, unlike some more recent anime live-action adaptations, one of the greatest assets of Bleach is how cohesively it outlines its mythology for the uninitiated." Additionally, Mark Schilling reviewed the film for The Japan Times and gave it a 3 star rating. He concluded that the film faithfully follows the mythology of the source material for the dedicated fans, but also simplifies it for casual viewers to understand.

Conversely, Rob Hunter from the Film School Rejects criticized the narrative of the story, especially when the female lead character, Rukia played by Hana Sugisaki, had to be reduced into a supporting-type character for the male lead character, Ichigo played by Sota Fukushi. He further praised Sugisaki's performances and lamented the fact that the actress was given weak materials for the film.
