= Yasutora Sado =

Fictional character from Bleach

Yasutora "Chad" Sado
- Bleach character
- Chad as illustrated by Tite Kubo
- First appearance: Bleach chapter 7: "The Pink Cheeked Parakeet" (2001)
- Created by: Tite Kubo
- Portrayed by: Yu Koyanagi
- Voiced by: Japanese; Hiroki Yasumoto; English; Marc Worden (Episode 2–85); Jamieson Price (Episode 86–366 and animated films); Kaiji Tang (live-action film); Alain Mesa (Episode 367–present)

In-universe information
- Nickname: Chad
- Nationality: Japanese-Mexican
- Weapon: Brazo Derecho de Gigante; Brazo Izquierdo del Diablo

Yasutora Sado (Japanese: 茶渡 泰虎, Hepburn: Sado Yasutora) is a fictional character in the Japanese manga and anime series Bleach created by Tite Kubo. He is also one of Ichigo Kurosaki's friends. Because Ichigo first read Yasutora's name off a nametag, he pronounced his family name as Chad (チャド, Chado) due to the variable pronunciations of kanji, and Ichigo continues to call him this throughout the story.

== Conception and development ==
Kubo stated that he began creating the characters "from their faces." According to Kubo, Chad "looked like he was of Mexican heritage" so he decided to make him half-Japanese and half-Mexican.

== Character outline ==
=== Personality ===
Chad is a tall teenager of Japanese and Mexican descent, and appears to be older than he really is. He has a tattoo on his left shoulder that consists of a winged heart and a snake, with a ribbon that reads 'Amore e Morte' ("love and death" in Italian) and has a very big mouth. During his early years, Chad was extremely violent. Exploiting his advantage in size, he intimidated and hit any child who annoyed him. Oscar Joaquin de la Rosa, his grandfather, 'Abuelo' inspired Chad to be gentle. Afterwards, Oscar gave Chad an old Mexican coin, which he treasured after Oscar's death. Since then, Chad vowed that he would never fight unless it was to protect others, as instructed — even if his own life was in danger. However, because of his constant involvement with gangs, Chad gained a reputation as a ruthless gangster.

Chad is a quiet person with a very kind heart and is sometimes the subject of jokes or bullies because he never fights back, against ordinary humans, or often hollows and Soul Reapers until necessary. Nonetheless, he is treated equally within his group of friends in Karakura (Ichigo, Keigo and Mizuiro). As he and Ichigo have a longtime relationship, having met each other while fighting off a group of bullies. Since then both decided to fight together, Chad becomes determined to train and get stronger in order to aid Ichigo in his fights as Ichigo and his enemies start becoming much stronger than Chad along the series. Chad also has a weakness for cute things, like small animals and Kon, and is one of the few characters that actually treats Kon with any dignity but for the most part ignores him. In a recent omake, when Orihime is trying to catch Nozomi with a plush cat, she captures Chad instead, who begins to cuddle with it. Besides his physical strength being able to lift 400 kg with ease, Chad has also shown to be very intelligent; he ranked 11th out of 322 in school, while Ichigo is ranked 23rd.

=== Abilities ===
Chad's armored arms.

When first introduced, Chad had no special powers aside from his unusual strength and endurance. After his encounter with the cockateel containing the soul of Yūichi Shibata, he starts to detect the approximate locations of spirits and hollows, but cannot fully see them. Only after saving Karin Kurosaki from a hollow, during the hollow-slaying match between Uryū and Ichigo, does Chad begin to fully see spirits. This also awakens what Chad later learns to be his latent powers as a Fullbringer, a human who manipulates the soul of an object to its full potential as the result of absorbing residual spirit pressure from a Hollow while unborn. Having been raised by his grandfather to take pride in his skin and Mexican heritage, Chad's Fullbring manifests on his body in the form of armor on his right arm called the Brazo Derecho [sic] del Gigante (巨人の右腕(ブラソ・デレチャ・デ・ヒガンテ), Buraso Derecha Del Higante; Spanish for "right arm of the giant". Japanese for "giant's right arm"). Chad's armor increases his strength beyond its already impressive level, and enables him to fire powerful energy blasts from his fist. After training with Renji, Chad gains an improved version of his armored arm. He also gains a new special attack called El Directo (巨人の一撃(エル・ディレクト), Eru Direkuto; Spanish for "the direct", also a Spanish boxing term for 'jab'. Japanese for "giant's strike".) To perform it, the flanges on Chad's arm open up and he punches the enemy.

While in Hueco Mundo, stating that his powers are closer to that of a hollow, Chad's Fullbring is strengthened by the environment to the point of manifesting armor on both arms instead of just his right. In addition, he also gains the ability to move at high speeds in a manner similar to flash steps and sonido. Chad's full-powered right arm is still called the Brazo Derecha de Gigante but is now used for defense instead of offense (though it's still more powerful offensively than his original arm). Brazo Derecha de Gigante becomes a shield that extends from his hand to some distance beyond his forearm with the same intricate pattern as before. Chad's armored left arm, used for attack, is known as the Brazo Izquierda [sic] del Diablo (悪魔の左腕(ブラソ・イスキエルダ・デル・ディアボロ), Buraso Isukieruda Deru Diaboro; Spanish for "left arm of the devil". Japanese for "Devil's left arm"). With this arm, Chad gains a special attack known as La Muerte (魔人の一撃(ラ・ムエルテ), Ra Muerute; Spanish for "the death," Japanese for "devil's strike"), a powerful fist containing energy from all his fingers.

== Plot overview ==
A few days after Ichigo becomes a Soul Reaper, Chad accepts a cursed cockatiel whose previous owners have all died horrible deaths. The bird is in fact the container for the spirit of a dead child, Yuichi Shibata, placed there by a hollow who uses him as bait. Chad is forced to fight the hollow despite not being able to see it, assisted by Rukia Kuchiki. Ichigo defeats the hollow then performs Konso on Yuichi. Later on, when Uryū Ishida's duel with Ichigo unleashes a multitude of hollows upon the town, Chad is pressed into battle with another hollow. It is this event that awakens his spiritual powers, which manifest as armor on his right arm.

After Rukia is taken back to Soul Society, Chad and Orihime Inoue are trained by Yoruichi Shihouin to consciously call upon their powers when needed. After a week, Chad leaves for Soul Society with Orihime, Uryū, Yoruichi, and Ichigo. When the group is separated once entering Seireitei, Chad ends up alone. Chad meets his match in Shunsui Kyōraku, captain of the 8th Division in the Gotei 13. Kyōraku easily beats Chad, leaving him heavily injured but alive. After being freed by Kenpachi Zaraki of the 11th Division and Rukia is rescued, Uryū, Chad, Ichigo and Orihime depart for the living world. In Karakura Town, Ichigo, Chad and Orihime are attacked by Ulquiorra Schiffer and Yammy Riyalgo, two of the first arrancars to invade Karakura Town. When the second invasion led by the Espada Grimmjow Jeagerjaques commences, Chad is attacked by an arrancar but is saved by Ichigo. Noting that he is unable to fight alongside Ichigo, Chad turns to Kisuke Urahara for help, asking for training.

After Orihime is captured by Sousuke Aizen, Chad joins Ichigo and his friends to rescue her from Hueco Mundo. After making their way to Las Noches and the group splits up, Chad runs into the Privaron Espada Gantenbainne Mosqueda. His victory is short-lived, however, as the 5th Espada, Nnoitora Jiruga, severely wounds him and leaves him for dead. Chad and Gantenbainne are eventually found by the Exequias, who plan to finish them off, but Retsu Unohana and Isane Kotetsu interrupt, and the former heals him. He later appears with Rukia and Renji to aid Ichigo and fight off the Exequias, but is defeated by the Cero Espada Yammy.

Seventeen months later, Chad appears as an ally of Xcution, a group of humans with supernatural powers called Fullbring. Having learned that he is a Fullbringer himself, Chad agrees to help restore Ichigo's Soul Reaper abilities for Xcution's needs. However, unaware that Xcution was using him for their plan to attack the Soul Society, Chad is attacked by Shūkurō Tsukishima and falls under the influence of his Fullbring to serve as an enforcer. But when he and Orihime experience a mental breakdown after Tsukishima attempts to "add" more details to their fake memories, Chad is knocked out by Urahara and Isshin before his mind is restored after Tsukishima's eventual death. Not too long afterwards, Chad accompanies his friends (sans Uryu) to Hueco Mundo in order to save the Arrancars from the Wandenreich. When Ichigo departs to assist the Soul Society against the Wandenreich invasion, Chad, Orihime and Urahara are grievously injured by Quilge Opie and fall to his arrows. They are then saved when Opie is killed by Grimmjow, whom they later join forces with.

Ten years later, Chad is now a professional boxer and challenger to the WBO World Heavyweight Title.

== Reception ==
Readers from the manga have liked Chad's character, with him appearing in the characters popularity polls from Bleach. In the first poll he ranked 6th with 2,109 votes. However, in following polls he did not appear in the top ten, being replaced by other characters. His character has also been featured in several types of merchandising from Bleach such as action figures, key chains and plush.

Various publications from manga, anime and other media have commented on Chad's character, adding praise and criticism. Popcultureshock.com writer Carlos Alexandre praised his character as, like each character, he is very convincing and particularly liked his pacifist attitude despite his appearance. Carlo Santos from Anime News Network (ANN) agreed on this although he found his visual design to be stereotypical, but his personality was unique. Jarred Pine from Mania Entertainment found Chad's reveal of spiritual powers as his favourite from volume 5 of the manga, additionally noting that it does not drag out the story. He also praised how Chad teams up with Ichigo's sister, Karin, in order to fight an attacking Hollow. However, Carl Kimlinger from ANN noted this not to be very surprising for viewers if they have watched other series based on manga from Weekly Shōnen Jump as it is common theme in those series. Bryce Coulter from Mania praised Chad's fight against Shunsui Kyoraku, noting his pacifist attitude along with Shunsui's as well as his flashback which intensifies his friendship with Ichigo. Jian DeLeon of Complex magazine named him tenth on a list of "The 25 Most Stylish Anime Characters," and stated, "Sado gets this spot because of his amazing burgundy motorcycle jacket. He's also not afraid to rock cream-colored pants, nor does he stray from patterned shirts."

== See also ==
- List of Bleach characters
