= Orihime Inoue =

Fictional character from Bleach

- Bleach character
- Orihime Inoue as illustrated by Tite Kubo
- First appearance: Bleach chapter 2: "Starter" (2001)
- Created by: Tite Kubo
- Portrayed by: Erina Mano
- Voiced by: Japanese; Yuki Matsuoka; English; Stephanie Sheh

In-universe information
- Gender: Female
- Family: Sora Inoue (older brother, deceased)
- Spouse: Ichigo Kurosaki
- Children: Kazui Kurosaki (son)
- Relatives: Isshin Kurosaki (father-in-law); Masaki Kurosaki (mother-in-law, deceased); Yuzu Kurosaki (sister-in-law); Karin Kurosaki (sister-in-law)
- Nationality: Japanese

Orihime Inoue (Note: Japanese: 井上 織姫, Hepburn: Inoue Orihime) is a fictional character of the manga series Bleach and its adaptations created by Tite Kubo. She is one of Ichigo Kurosaki's friends. Like the many other characters in the series, she quickly develops powers of her own after Ichigo becomes a Soul Reaper. Throughout the series, Orihime learns about Ichigo's duty as a Soul Reaper and accompanies him when they go to the Soul Society to save Rukia Kuchiki, and is depicted as Ichigo's wife in the epilogue.

Besides the manga series, Orihime appears in other media, including the anime series, anime films, video games and rock musicals. She has been fairly popular among readers of the manga since her introduction, having ranked within the top 10 or the top 20 in all of the characters popularity polls of the series. Additionally, Orihime has gained additional popularity via the Loituma Girl internet meme, and various pieces of merchandising have been developed based on her appearance such as figurines and key chains. Publications from manga, anime and other media have also commented on her character with most praising her traits and development.

In the anime adaptation, Orihime is voiced by Yuki Matsuoka in Japanese. In the English dub, she is voiced by Stephanie Sheh. In the 2018 live-action film Bleach, she is portrayed by Japanese actress and singer Erina Mano.

== Concept and creation ==
Along with Ichigo, Orihime has the hardest face to draw according to Kubo. Due to her importance in the manga, Kubo wanted more practice drawing her so that it would be easier to do so. When Kubo was asked to make a cover with a female character during Christmas, Kubo initially thought of using Rukia Kuchiki; However, he later changed to use Orihime as he thought she was more suitable for such a role. She becomes the true female lead for the rest of the Bleach franchise after the second anime season/manga arc, which was recognized when her character depth and importance raised drastically after she came back from the Soul Society and started to become a prominent plot device for Ichigo's character development and for the story itself, consequently Orihime was featured along with female leads from other Weekly Shōnen Jump series on a special Shonen Jump cover. Stephanie Sheh, Orihime's English voice actress, found her to be a "tricky" character as she noted a challenge to find a balance with her voice as although she sometimes seems ditzy, in other times she is very strong.

In Bleach JET interview, Kubo initially have Orihime's power revolve around horn and tail, taken appearance of a dragons.

== Character outline ==
Orihime is politely kind. She comes off as naïve and rather clueless, which is at odds with her exceptionally high marks in school. Her cooking style can be described as very bad, disgusting, or more often strange to the point that aside from Rangiku Matsumoto, no one would think it delectable, and is one of the running jokes in the series. Orihime has a tendency to rush into situations without thinking, sometimes leading to embarrassing or even dangerous consequences. She tends to have an overactive imagination and gets carried away thinking of implausible scenarios, such as initially fantasizing a date with Ichigo, later ending into her becoming a boxing champion prior to being shot. Her hair is worn long in honor of the promise Tatsuki Arisawa once made to protect her.

Orihime experiences most feelings, which leads her to be jealous of the relationship that Ichigo and Rukia Kuchiki share despite her friendship and admiration of both of them. Through her expanding role in the manga, Orihime was happier and goofier at the start of the series, but later arcs deal with her feelings of inadequacy and inner turmoils. Orihime lives by herself in Karakura Town, where the story takes place, and is supported by her distant aunt provided that she continuously obtain good marks in school, which she does. She and her brother Sora were raised by parents who treated them poorly. When Sora turned eighteen, he ran away with Orihime, who was three years old, and raised her since. For nine years, the siblings lived in harmony, until Sora died in a car accident, leaving Orihime an orphan.

== Appearances ==
=== In Bleach ===
Orihime first appears in Bleach pilot chapter that Kubo submitted to Weekly Shōnen Jump. She is a teenager who attends Karakura High School and Ichigo's friend. After Ichigo gains the powers of a Soul Reaper, his interactions with Orihime begin to have unforeseen side effects. Orihime become spiritually aware after being saved by Ichigo from Acidwire, her late brother turned into a hollow. The hollow attacks Karakura High School, but Orihime uses her own power Shun Shun Rikka to save Tatsuki Arisawa. After Rukia Kuchiki is taken back to the Soul Society to be executed, Orihime joins Ichigo with Uryū Ishida, Yasutora Sado and Yoruichi Shihōin, in an effort to save her. Upon arriving there, their group is split up, and Orihime wanders the city with Uryū. Later on, Orihime is captured by Makizō Aramaki, a Soul Reaper of the 11th division, but is later freed by captain Kenpachi Zaraki. After Rukia is saved by Ichigo, the group returns to the human world.

Orihime joins the others when they deal with the Bount in anime-only episodes. Afterwards, arrancar begin to invade Karakura Town. During a battle with the Espada Yammy, the attack component of Orihime's Shun Shun Rikka is destroyed, making her not helping in the next battles. After sitting on the sidelines for the second arrancar invasion, Orihime has Tsubaki restored by Hachigen Ushōda, and Orihime goes to the Soul Society to train for the next attack. While traveling between the two realms, she meets Ulquiorra Cifer, who threatens to kill Ichigo and her friends, unless she agrees to go to Hueco Mundo. Orihime leaves and heads to Hueco Mundo. There, Orihime meets Sousuke Aizen, a former Soul Reaper and current leader of the Arrancar. Aizen explains that he intends to use Orihime's Shun Shun Rikka to restore the Hōgyoku (崩玉; "breakdown sphere"), though she decides to use her powers to destroy the Orb instead. Before she can act on her plans, Ichigo and a group of others arrive in Hueco Mundo to save her. When Ichigo is defeated while facing Ulquiorra, Grimmjow Jeagerjaques, wanting to battle Ichigo at full strength, frees Orihime from her confinements so that she can heal him. Ichigo battles with Grimmjow and ultimately claims victory. They are then attacked by Nnoitora Jiruga, but after Nnoitora's death at the hands of Kenpachi, Orihime is captured once again. Ichigo rushes to her location, and engages Ulquiorra in battle, but is once again defeated. During the aftermath, she discovers that Ichigo is transformed into a new hollow and he mortally hurts Ulquiorra. Ulquiorra starts to turn into ashes as he asks Orihime if she is afraid of him. Orihime, after saying that he is not frightening, tries to reach his hand but Ulquiorra finally disappears. As Ichigo returns to the world of the living, Orihime remains behind to heal Uryū.

After Aizen's defeat, Orihime spends her normal life, until Uryū is attacked by a human with supernatural powers. It turns out that Tsukishima attacked Uryū, and his subordinate Shishigawara, and Tsukishima stabs her with his Fullbring before leaving. Later, it is revealed that Tsukishima's power has altered her memories. Later, Orihime and her friends went to Hueco Mundo to fight off the Wandenreich, a group of Quincys seeking to destroy the Soul Society led by their leader Yhwach. Orihime and the others fight them off and liberate Hueco Mundo from one of the Wandenreich's high-ranked officers Quilge Opie. Later, Ichigo finds out that the Wandenreich are attacking the Soul Society. When Ichigo gets overwhelmed, Orihime saves him. Ten years after the war, Orihime marries Ichigo and has a son, Kazui Kurosaki.

=== In other media ===
Her character has gained additional popularity even among non-fans thanks to a short looped animation of Orihime twirling a leek (specifically, a negi, or Welsh onion) played to "Ievan Polkka". Known as the Loituma Girl, the five frames used in the flash cartoon were taken from the second episode in the anime. Orihime appears in the Bleach: Memories of Nobody, Bleach: The DiamondDust Rebellion and Bleach: Hell Verse, albeit in a minor role. She also appears in the Bleach video games such as Heat the Soul as a playable character. Orihime also stars alongside Rukia Kuchiki in the Bleach Beat Collection Season 2 with solo song "La La La" and duet song "Holy Fight." In the 2018 live-action film Bleach, Orihime is played by Japanese actress and singer Erina Mano.

== Reception ==
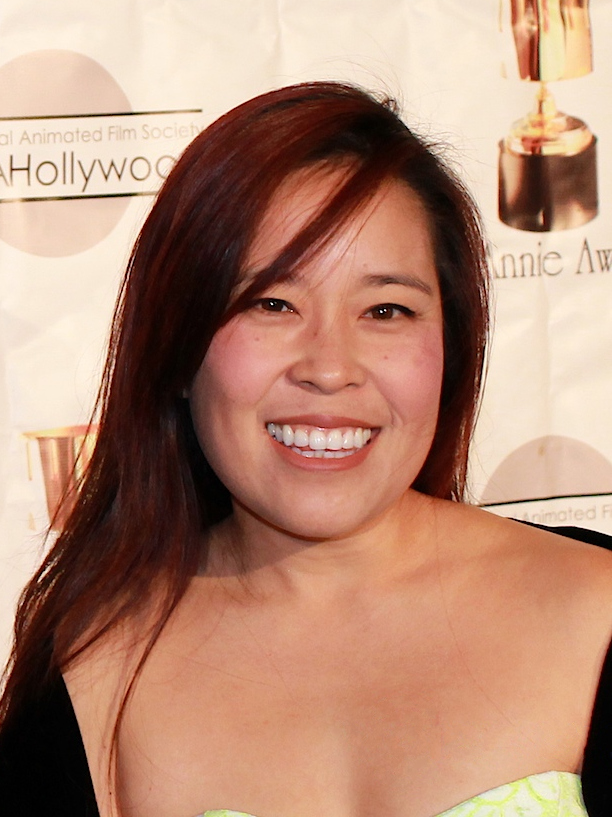
Stephanie Sheh provides the voice of Orihime in the English dub.

=== Popularity ===
At the first Seiyu Awards in March 2007, Yuki Matsuoka was one of the winners in the category "Best Actresses in supporting roles" for her role as Orihime. The character of Orihime has been well received by readers from the manga, appearing at No. 5 in the first characters popularity poll. She did not appear in the top ten from the second (having ranked 12th), but returned in the two followings; in the 3rd poll she ranked 10th, and was 8th in the most recent, surpassing Izuru Kira by 123 votes. Various types of merchandising have been released based on Orihime's character such as plush, key chains and figurines. Pins based on her hair clips have also been released for cosplaying.

=== Critical response ===
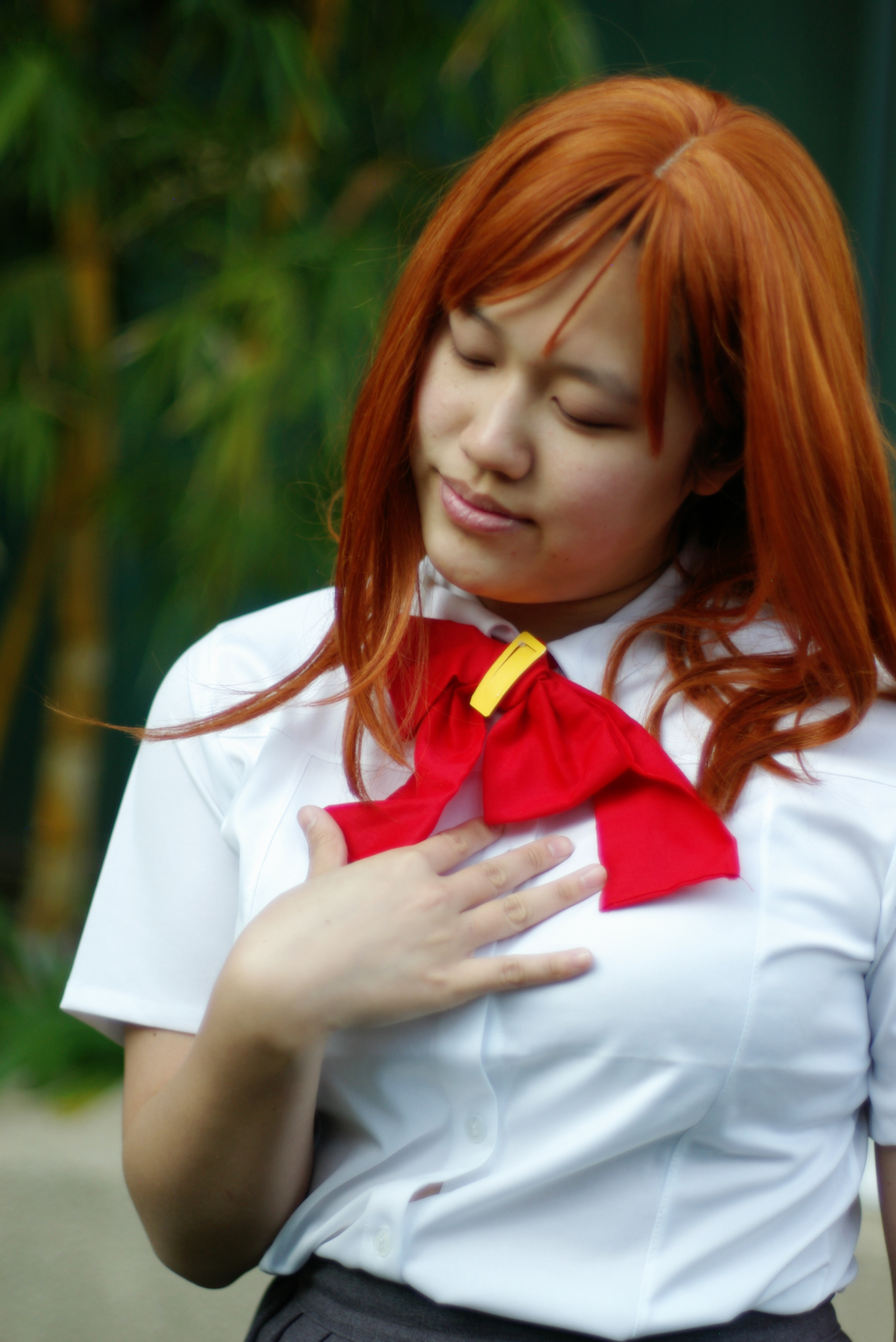
An Orihime cosplayer

Various publications for manga, anime and other media have commented on Orihime's character, adding praise to her traits and development. Mania Entertainment writer Jarred Pine liked Orihime's development in the first volume of the manga as her encounter with the hollow from her brother added "more dimension" to her character rather than her portray of a "big-breasted bimbo" in which she was initially introduced. Although Carlo Santos from Anime News Network (ANN) found her character to be stereotypical due to the way she uses her powers, he noted that (like each character) she was very interesting due to the personality she has. D. F. Smith from IGN complained on Orihime's appearances when she joins her friends to rescue Rukia Kuchiki since most of them were only comical and they were very repetitive. Stephanie Sheh was praised as one of the best voice actors from Viz Media's dub by Carl Kimlinger from ANN. Carlos Alexandre from popcultureshock.com also praised Sheh's work, noting that she makes a good interpretation from Orihime's character. In an Anime News Network poll, Orihime was voted as the fourth worst cook in anime.

== See also ==
- List of Bleach characters
