= List of Bleach chapters (188–423) =

Cover of the 22nd tankōbon volume, released in Japan by Shueisha on May 2, 2006

The chapters 188–423 of the Bleach manga series, written and illustrated by Tite Kubo, comprise the "Arrancar arc" (破面篇, Arankaru Hen). The plot follows the Substitute Soul Reaper Ichigo Kurosaki who is in charge of slaying Hollows, evil spirits that attack people. He also encounters former Soul Reaper Sousuke Aizen, who created an army of powerful Hollows called Arrancars to destroy the Soul Reapers' organization, Soul Society. In the arc, Ichigo and his allies enter Hueco Mundo to find Orihime.

Bleach was published in individual chapters by Shueisha in Weekly Shonen Jump magazine and was later collected in tankōbon (book) format. In addition to the main series chapters, some chapters are published with a negative chapter number; they are side stories and consist of events that precede the start of the series. The 188th chapter was published on August 8, 2005, while chapter 423 was released on October 11, 2010. The volumes that include the arc are 22 to 48; the former was published on May 2, 2006, and the latter was released on December 3, 2010.

An anime adaptation, produced by Studio Pierrot and TV Tokyo, was broadcast by TV Tokyo. The arc was adapted into episodes from several different seasons intersped with filler episodes and arcs; season 6's episode 110, aired on January 10, 2007, starts the story concluded in season 14's episode 310, broadcast on February 22, 2011.

North American licensor Viz Media serialized the individual chapters in Shonen Jump starting from November 2007 in the United States. Viz Media released the 22nd volume on February 5, 2008, and volume 48 was published on October 2, 2012. A box set containing volumes 22–48 was released on July 7, 2015, along with the Bleach pilot and a poster. The company also re-released the series under the label of "3-in-1 Edition"; the books containing volumes 22 and 48 were released on May 6, 2014, and on August 2, 2016, respectively.

== Volumes ==
No.	Title	Original release date	English release date
22	Conquistadores	May 2, 2006; 978-4-08-874049-2	February 5, 2008; 978-1-4215-1179-5
188. "CRUSH THE WORLD DOWN"; 189. "RESOLVE"; 190. "Conquistadores"; 191. "Conquistadores 2 (Screaming Symphony)"; 192. "Conquistadores 3 (Hounded Priestess)"; 193. "Conquistadores 4 (Ebony & Ivory)"; 194. "Conquistadores 5 (La Basura)"; 195. "Death & Strawberry (Reprise)"; 196. "PUNCH DOWN THE STONE CIRCLE"; 197. "The Approaching Danger"
After defeating Grand Fisher, Isshin is found by Urahara as he explains that there are more Arrancars and that they are serving the rogue Soul Reaper Sousuke Aizen and that the Hôgyoku will take a year to be fully awaken. Shinji attempts to recruit Ichigo into the Visoreds, only to be refused despite telling Ichigo that his inner hollow would overpower him if he does not. As Chad and Orihime try to ask Shinji what happened to Ichigo, only be meet Shinji's fellow Visored ally Hiyori Sarugaki. The following day a pair of Arrancars named Ulquiorra Schiffer and Yammy Riyalgo are dispatched to by Aizen to Karakura town where they are to investigate someone with latter consuming all human souls within the area. Coming to Orihime and Chad's aid when they are overpowered by Yammy (who is revealed to be the one the Arrancars were sent to observe), Ichigo is easily defeated when his inner hollow interferes. Luckily, Urahara and Yoruichi Shihōin arrive, and Yammy is easily beaten before he and Ulquiorra fall back to Hueco Mundo. Later, Ichigo learns that Rukia Kuchiki has been dispatched from the Soul Society, alongside Tōshirō Hitsugaya, Renji Abarai, Rangiku Matsumoto, Ikkaku Madarame and Yumichika Ayasegawa.
23	¡Mala Suerte!	August 4, 2006; 978-4-08-874140-6	June 3, 2008; 978-1-4215-1541-0
198. "The Icecold Discord"; 199. "Ugly"; 200. "Night of Sledgehammer"; 201. "Wind & Snowbound"; 202. "¡Mala Suerte!"; 203. "¡Mala Suerte! 2 (El Monstruo)"; 204. "¡Mala Suerte! 3 (Monstruo Sangrienta)"; 205. "¡Mala Suerte! 4 (Tempestad de La Lucha)" (Note: When released in tankōbon 23, chapter 205 was renamed from "¡Mala Suerte! 4 (Monstruo Monstruoso)" to "¡Mala Suerte! 4 (Tempestad de La Lucha)".); 0. "side-A the sand"; 0. "side-B the rotator"
After Ulquiorra and Yammy are debrief their mission to Aizen and his inner circle, including other high-ranked Arrancars known as Espada, the impulsive Sexta Espada Grimmjow Jaegerjaquez decides to invade Karakura Town to kill any spiritual powered human with his fracción subordinates: Arrancar 12 Shawlong Qufang, Arrancar 13 Edorad Leones, Arrancar 14 Ilfort Grantz, Arrancar 15 Nakim Greendina and Arrancar 16 D-Roy Linker. Chad is attacked by D-Roy, who is defeated by Rukia with her restored Soul Reaper powers and her zanpakutō "Sode no Shirayuki". Grimmjow arrives and injures Rukia, before Ichigo takes over the fight. Meanwhile, Ichigo's classmate Keigo Asano ends up witnessing Ikkaku's fight against Edorad as the confident and self-determined Soul Reaper is forced to use his Bankai: Ryūmon Hōzukimaru.
24	Immanent God Blues	October 4, 2006; 978-4-08-874262-5	September 2, 2008; 978-1-4215-1603-5
206. "¡Mala Suerte! 5 [LUCKY]"; 207. "Mode: Genocide"; 208. "The Scissors"; 209. "Lift the Limit"; 210. "Turn the True Power On" (Note: When released in tankōbon 24, chapter 210 was renamed from "Don't Call Me Niño" to "Turn the True Power On".); 211. "Stroke of Sanity"; 212. "You Don't Hear My Name Anymore"; 213. "trifle"; 214. "Immanent God Blues"
Collapsing after defeating Edorad, Ikkaku comes to while reminiscing how he joined Squad Eleven and that he kept his bankai out of respect towards his captain, Kenpachi Zaraki. Meanwhile, as Shawlong explains the number ranking structure of an Arrancars' power to Hitsugaya, the Soul Reaper captain, Rangiku and Renji have problems fighting their Arrancar opponents. Luckily, Rangiku receives confirmation from the Soul Society that they have been granted permission to lift their power limits, allowing the Soul Reapers to defeat their opponents at full power. Meanwhile, Ichigo is overpowered by Grimmjow while contending once more with his inner hollow. Before Grimmjow can release his zanpakutō, Kaname Tōsen arrives to take the Espada back to Hueco Mundo for acting against Aizen's orders. As Grimmjow is demoted with his arm sliced by Tōsen, Ichigo looks for the Visards as his inner hollow has become too powerful to control. Meanwhile, Ishida trains with his father under the Karakura Hospital while Chad requests Urahara to train him.
25	No Shaking Throne	December 4, 2006; 978-4-08-874289-2	December 2, 2008; 978-1-4215-1796-4
215. "Tug Your God Out"; 216. "The Suppression of Darkness"; 217. "Hole in My Heart"; 218. "Dark Side of Universe 3"; 219. "Black & White 3"; 220. "King & His Horse"; 221. "Let Eat the World's End"; 222. "NO SHAKING THRONE"; 223. "The Scarlet Creation"
Ichigo tells Shinji that he has only come to them because he wants to learn to control the hollow inside him, and Hiyori dons her hollow mask to fight Ichigo. As Ichigo was about to be defeated or being unwilling to use either his hollow mask or his bankai, his inner hollow surfaces and the other Vizards restrain him before he can harm Hiyori. After giving Ichigo an exercise to assess his spirit energy, Shinji explains that Ichigo need to confront his inner hollow in his inner world. Hirako renders Ichigo unconscious as his body undergoes hollowification. In his inner world, Ichigo battles his inner hollow who introduces himself as Zangetsu while explaining he has no desire to serve someone with no instinct for battle. As the Vizards restrain his body and halt the hollowification, Ichigo manages to defeat his inner hollow and return to normal. Elsewhere, Genryūsai Shigekuni Yamamoto speaks with Hitsugaya concerning Aizen's objective: using the Hōgyoku to product a dimensional key called the Ōken from the souls in Karakura Town. Yamamoto concludes that Aizen's goal is to assassinate the hidden ruler of the Soul Society, the Soul King, and that Aizen will make his move in within four months.
26	The Mascaron Drive	February 2, 2007; 978-4-08-874315-8	March 3, 2009; 978-1-4215-2384-2
224. "Imitated Gaiety"; 225. "Slip into My Barrier"; 226. "Right of My Heart" (Note: When released in tankōbon 26, chapter 226 was renamed from "The Right of The Heart" to "Right of My Heart".); 227. "The Swordless Soldier"; 228. "Don't Look Back"; 229. "The Howling Tempest"; 230. "Dead White Invasion" (Note: When released in tankōbon 26, chapter 230 was renamed from "The White Invasion" to "Dead White Invasion".); 231. "The Mascaron Drive"; 232. "The Mascaron Drive 2"; 233. "El Violador"
Urahara manages to ask Renji to help train Chad, so he can fight the Arrancars, convincing Orihime not to participate after having lost her attack spirit Tsubaki heavily damaged during the encounter by Yammy. After Tsubaki is repaired by the Vizard Hachigen Ushōda, Orihime is found by Rukia as she decides to train her at the Soul Society. Later, as Ichigo is able to wear his hollow mask for eleven seconds from his training, Aizen tasks Ulquiorra to lead a mission with a group consisting of Yammy, revealed to be Espada Ten, the newly created Arrancar 77 Wonderweiss Margera, Grimmjow, and the new Sexta Espada Luppi Antenor. Though Ichigo overpowers Grimmjow, the former Espada has the advantage after Ichigo's mask shattered after eleven seconds. Meanwhile, after telling Yammy to stand aside, Luppi overpowers all the Soul Reapers present by entering his Resurrección state to capture them in his tentacles from his back. But Urahara evens the odds as he battles Yammy. In Soul Society, as Orihime crosses into the real world, she is confronted by Ulquiorra.
27	Goodbye, Halcyon Days	April 4, 2007; 978-4-08-874339-4	June 2, 2009; 978-1-4215-2385-9
234. "Not Negotiation"; 235. "The Frozen Clutch"; 236. "The Sun Already Gone Down"; 237. "goodbye, halcyon days."; 238. "Eagle Without Wings"; 239. "WINGED EAGLES"; 240. "regeneration."; 241. "Silverflame."; 242. "TWO MEN ARE BURNING"
Under orders from Aizen, Ulquiorra demands Orihime to leave with him or he would kill all her friends. She is forced to comply and is given twelve hours to say goodbye to one person while wearing a bracelet that makes her invisible. Meanwhile, Hitsugaya defeats Luppi while Ichigo is overwhelmed by Grimmjow after being unable to use his hollow powers completely. Grimmjow nearly kills Ichigo, but is saved by Rukia as Shinji Hirako comes to her aid and takes over fighting Grimmjow. The fight soon when ends when Ulquiorra orders all the arrancars to fall back as they achieved their mission. Finding Ichigo recovering from his injuries, she confesses her feelings for him and heals him before leaving with Ulquiorra. The next day, Ichigo and his friends learn of Orihime's disappearance is gone and that the Soul Society has no intention of saving her. But Ichigo, unwilling to abandon Orihime, turns to Urahara for a means to enter the hollows' world of Hueco Mundo, joined by Uryū and Chad. After arriving in Hueco Mundo, the group find themselves facing the Arrancars Demōra and Iceringer. Meanwhile, Orihime is brought before Aizen and is asked demonstrate her power by restoring Grimmjow's arm. Grimmjow then asks Orihime to restore his tattoo before killing Luppi to regain his rank among the Espadas.
28	Baron's Lecture Full-Course	June 4, 2007; 978-4-08-874365-3	September 1, 2009; 978-1-4215-2386-6
243. "The Knuckle & The Arrow"; 244. "Born From The Fear"; 245. "THE WAY WITHOUT ENEMIES"; 246. "The Great Desert Bros."; 247. "United On The Desert"; 248. "Alive and Back Here Once Again" (再び生きて この場所へ, "Futatabi Ikite, Kono Basho e"); 249. "Back to the Innocence" (Note: When released in tankōbon 28, chapter 249 was renamed from "Back to The Innocent" to "Back to The Innocence".); 250. "Five Ways To Three Figures"; 251. "Baron's Lecture 1st Period"
Using their new fighting skills, Uryū and Chad easily defeat Demōra and Iceringer before they and Ichigo escape the collapsing building. Upon seeing Las Noches, the castle Aizen is located at, they begin running across the desert of Hueco Mundo which is impeded by various natural hazards. In the desert, they encounter three hollows in pursuit of small child, and go to her defense. But they learn the child is an arrancar named Nel and the hollows are her mutually adopted brothers Pesche Guatiche and Dondochakka Bilstin and their pet Bawabawa. Nel and her family, despite initially distrustful toward Ichigo, guide him to Las Noches before Rukia and Renji arrive to save them from the sand-based hollow Runuganga. After breaking into Las Noches and finding themselves at a five-way fork, Ichigo's group splits up and each takes one path. When Nel chases after Ichigo, Pesche and Dondochakka forget the direction she took and travel down different paths. Ichigo, Uryū, and Chad soon each encounter a Privaron Espada, Espada who have been demoted in favor of stronger replacements.
29	The Slashing Opera	August 3, 2007; 978-4-08-874398-1	December 1, 2009; 978-1-4215-2387-3
252. "REBUT TO THE BARON'S LECTURE"; 253. "Don't Call Me Niño"; 254. "Leave the Chocolate Here" ("Deja Chocolate Aquí"); 255. "DON'T BREATHE IN THE BUSH"; 256. "Infinite Slick"; 257. "The Slashing Opera" (Note: When released in tankōbon 29, chapter 257 was renamed from "The BirdHunter" to "The Slashing Opera".); 258. "Seeleschneider"; 259. "Flicker Flames"; 260. "RIGHTARM OF THE GIANT2"; Special: "Bleach on the Beach"
Ichigo begins to battle Privaron Espada 103 Dordoni Alessandro Del Socaccio, deciding to use his hollow powers as Nell gets hurt as the battle escalates. Explaining his hope of regaining his Espada status by facing Ichigo at his full power, Dordonii is defeated and thanks Ichigo for not holding back by holding off the Exequias of Arrancar 61 Rudbornn Chelute that were sent by the Octava Espada Szayelaporro Grantz. Meanwhile, Uryū and Pesche find themselves fighting for their lives against Privaron Espada 105 Cirucci Sanderwicci before Uryū defeats her in the matter that lives her powerless to come after them later. Meanwhile, Chad is at a disadvantage against Privaron Espada 107 Gantenbainne Mosqueda. After absorbing several blows, Chad realizes how to access his full power, and transforms his right arm.
30	There Is No Heart Without You	October 4, 2007; 978-4-08-874423-0	March 2, 2010; 978-1-4215-2388-0
261. "LEFT ARM OF THE DEMON ("Left Arm of The Devil"); 262. "Unblendable"; 263. "Unexpected"; 264. "Don't Say That Name Again"; 265. "Bang the Bore"; 266. "Hide Away From the Sun"; 267. "Legions of the Regrets" ("Legions of The Reglets"); 268. "You Are Forbidden to Die" (君 死にたもうこと勿れ, "Kimi Shinitamō Koto Nakare"); 269. "The End Is Near"
With his new Brazo Derecho del Gigante ability, Chad is able to defeat Gantenbainne before being attacked by the Quinto Espada Nnoitora Gilga. Meanwhile, Rukia encounters who she believed was Kaien Shiba, who explains the hollow that fused into his being allowed him to survive and he ended serving Aizen. Though willing to let him kill her for atonement while asking to save Orihime first, Rukia learns "Kaien" is an impostor when he asks her to slaughter her friends. Overpowered, Rukia releases her opponent is avoiding the sunlight and uses a kidō to blasts a hole in the wall. The artificial sunlight exposes the impostor to be the Noveno Espada Aaroniero Arruruerie, who reveals that he indirectly assimilated Kaien to Rukia's horror. After Aaroniero assumes his released state, to use the full powers of the countless hollows he devoured, Aaroniero impales Rukia. But recalling Kaien's words of how a person's heart passes to those they are close to, Rukia regains her resolve and impales Aaroniero's top skull while destroying his opponent's body with Kaien's soul now able to rest. As Aaroniero's disembodied skulls die, Rukia collapses from her injuries and is assumed dead. As Renji and Dondochakka Bilstin are confronted by Szayelaporro, who is revealed to be Espada Eight, Ichigo runs into Ulquiorra who reveals to be the one who abducted Orihime.
31	Don't Kill My Volupture	December 4, 2007; 978-4-08-874444-5	June 1, 2010; 978-1-4215-2809-0
270. "WARning"; 271. "If You Rise From the Ashes"; 272. "Don't Kill My Volupture"; 273. "DOG eat DOG"; 274. "The Monster"; 275. "The United Front 2 (Red & White)"; 276. "Blockin' Beast" (Note: When released in tankōbon 31, chapter 276 was renamed from "Blookin' Beast" to "Blockin' Beast".); 277. "Corrosion of Conformity"; 278. "Heal for The Crash"
A furious Ichigo uses his bankai in addition to his hollow powers, but is unable to defeat Ulquiorra. Ichigo refuses to give up, however, believing Ulquiorra to be the top-ranked Espada and that his defeat would end this war. But Ulquiorra explains he actually Espada Four and stabs Ichigo in the chest while telling him his only choices are to either escape from Hueco Mundo or die. Meanwhile, Orihime is confronted by Loly Aivirrne and Menoly Mallia, two female arrancars decide to put the girl for winning Aizen's favor. But Grimmjow defeats the two female arrancars and takes Orihime with him after she heals the girls to Loly's disdain. In Renji's fight with Szayelaporro, Uryū arrives to aid him. Despite joining forces to maneuvers him into a trap, Renji and Uryū find that Szayelaporro survived as he eats one of his Fracciones to completely heals himself. Szayelaporro then leaves to replace his damaged clothing while giving Renji and Uryū time to formulate a new plan. Elsewhere, Grimmjow brings Orihime to Ichigo, and asks Orihime to heal Ichigo so he can fight him again. Ulquiorra intervenes, but Grimmjow isolates him in another dimension.
32	Howling	February 4, 2008; 978-4-08-874473-5	September 7, 2010; 978-1-4215-2810-6
279. "Jugulators"; 280. "Jugulators 2"; 281. "THE VULGARIAN NOISE"; 282. "THE PRIMAL FEAR"; 283. "You don't hurt anymore"; 284. "Historia del Pantera y sus Sombras"; 285. "Devour the Flesh, Alone" (肉喰みて, ひとり, "Shishi Hamite, Hitori") (Note: When released in tankōbon 32, chapter 285 was renamed from "Devour the Flesh, Alone - Solitude of the King" (肉喰みて、ひとりー王の孤独, "Shishi Hamite, Hitori — Ō no Kodoku") to "Devour the Flesh, Alone" (肉喰みて, ひとり, "Shishi Hamite, Hitori").); 286. "Guillotine You Standing" (Note: When released in tankōbon 32, chapter 286 was renamed from "Tooth and Nail" to "Guillotine You Standing".); -16. "Death on the Ice Field" (氷原に死す, "Hyōgen ni Shisu") (Note: When released in tankōbon 32, chapter -15 was renumbered to -16.)
Orihime finishes healing Ichigo, and Ichigo begins to fight Grimmjow. Even after using his bankai, Ichigo finds himself outmatched against Grimmjow. But Ichigo dons his hollow mask, which he can now use for longer stints as Grimmjow responds by releases his zanpakutō, their fight observed by the Espada Tier Halibel and her three Fracciones. Though Ichigo is slowly worn down by Grimmjow, Orihime musters the courage to cheer for him and he manages to deal a blow across Grimmjow's chest. Grimmjow, despite being wounded, refuses to give up as he uses his strongest attack on Ichigo. But Ichigo overcomes it and deals a final blow, leaving Grimmjow on the ground while preparing to take Orihime away from Las Noches. However, Grimmjow refuses to end the fight there before he is suddenly attacked by Nnoitora. The last chapter is focused on Hitsugaya's backstory, showing how he discovered his Soul Reaper powers and met Rangiku.
33	The Bad Joke	April 4, 2008; 978-4-08-874494-0	December 7, 2010; 978-1-4215-2811-3
287. "Don't Forget Till You Die"; 288. "The Bad Joke"; 289. "The Scarmask"; 290. "Unleash The Beast" (Note: When released in tankōbon 33, chapter 290 was renamed from "The Broken Mask" to "Unleash The Beast".); 291. "Thank You For Defending Me" ("Thank You For Defend Me"); 292. "Rupture My Replica"; 293. "Urge to Unite" ("Urge for Unite"); 294. "If You Call Me a Beast, I'll Kill You Like a Tempest" ("If You Call Me Beast, Kill You Like Tempest"); 295. "The Last Mission"
Revealed to be Quinto Espada, Nnoitora battles an exhausted Ichigo when he comes to an injured Grimmjow's aid. Meanwhile, Renji and Uryū face Szayelapororo as he returns and assumes his released state. After his Fraccion Tesla Lindocruz captures Orihime, Nnoitora recognizes the terrified Nel and reveals that she is actually the former Espada Three Nelliel Tu Oderschvanck. Ichigo still attempts to protect Nel, but is pinned to the ground. As Nnoitora prepares to break Ichigo's arm, the intensity of Nel's emotions causes her to assume her original adult form. As it revealed that Nelliel's exile was caused by Nnoitora damaging her hollow mask for her moral code, she assumes her Resurrección state to settle things with her opponent. At the same time, after Uryū and Renji manage to destroy their clones, Szayelapororo creates voodoo dolls to injure them while Dondochakka and Pesche, revealed to be Nelliel's Fracciones, attempt to aid their Soul Reaper allies.
34	King of The Kill	July 4, 2008; 978-4-08-874541-1	March 1, 2011; 978-1-4215-2812-0
296. "Changed Again And Again"; 297. "King of the Kill"; 298. "INTRUDERZ 3"; 299. "The Verbal Warfare"; 300. "Curse Named Love"; 301. "Nothing Like Equal" (Note: When released in tankōbon 34, chapter 301 was renamed from "Shut Up & Die" to "Nothing Like Equal".); 302. "Pride on the Blade"; 303. "Dumdum-Dummy-Dumbstruck"; 304. "Battle of Barbarians"; 305. "The Rising Phoenix"
When Neliel attempts to finish off Nnoitora, she transforms back into her child form. Ichigo tries to help Nel, but almost killed by Tesla when Kenpachi Zaraki intervenes. Telling Ichigo not to interfere in his fight against Nnoitora, Kenpachi reveals that Urahara made the entrance into Hueco Mundo stable enough for the captains to enter: Retsu Unohana saves Chad and Gantenbainne from the Exequias. Byakuya reaches Rukia as she was about to be killed by Séptima Espada Zommari Rureaux, who he kills when the Espada whose Rukia's body like a puppet to fight him. Renji, Uryū and Nel's Fracciones are saved by Mayuri, who stops Szayel's techniques. Mayuri initially seems unable to fight back against Szayelaporro, but he reveals that placed a bacteria in Uryū that allow him to learn of the voodoo dolls and counter them. Mayuri then activates his bankai and has it swallow Szayelaporro. Though Szayelaporro resurrect himself by absorbing Nemu's spiritual particles through his Gabriel technique while turning Mayuri's bankai against him. However, Szayelaporro learns too late that he ingested a "superhuman" drug inside Nemu's body that increases his senses to the point where his body cannot respond to the overstimulation, leaving him at Mayuri's mercy as he stabs the immobilizes Espada in the heart.
35	Higher Than The Moon	October 3, 2008; 978-4-08-874575-6	June 7, 2011; 978-1-4215-3312-4
306. "Not Perfect is GOoD"; 307. "Bite it, Slash it"; 308. "SATAN FROM ORBIT"; 309. "Pray For the Mantis"; 310. "FOUR ARMS TO KILLING YOU"; 311. "The Undead 4"; 312. "Higher Than The Moon" (Note: When released in tankōbon 35, chapter 312 was renamed from "Fervorous - Ferocious" to "Higher Than The Moon".); 313. "TO CLOSE YOUR WORLD"; 314. "Night Side of Abduction"; 315. "MARCH OF THE DEATH"
Mayuri stabs Szayelaporro, who perceives the slow pain to be an eternity from his perspective, through his hand and heart. Mayuri denounces Szayelaporro as a scientist for his vainglory as breaks the blade and proceeds to help himself to the Espada's research. Meanwhile, Kenpachi has difficulty fighting Nnoitra before he assumes his released form. Kenpachi eventually reveals he is on the verge of death and uses resorts to using kendo to severely injures Nnoitra. Kenpachi attempts to leave before Nnoitra, reminded of how Neliel spared him for his weakness, insists to finish their battle. Kenpachi accepts and inflicts the finishing blow at this charging opponent. Soon after, Orihime is spirited off by the Primera Espada Coyote Stark as she is brought before Aizen. Using Tōsen's kidō to contact everyone present, Aizen reveals that the abduction of Orihime, which everyone though was to increase the Hōgyoku's power, was actually a means to weakened the Soul Society's forces. Leaving Ulquiorra to oversee Las Noches in his absence as he places the fortress in shutdown, Aizen departs for Karakura Town with Gin, Tōsen, and the Espadas Stark, Halibel, Baraggan Louisenbairn and their Fracciones. But the group are met by the remaining captains of the Thirteen Court Guard Squads and their lieutenants in what is revealed to be a fake Karakura Town as Ichigo races to Las Noches to save Orihime.
36	Turn Back The Pendulum	December 4, 2008; 978-4-08-874603-6	September 6, 2011; 978-1-4215-3313-1
-108. "Turn Back the Pendulum"; -107. "Turn Back the Pendulum 2"; -106. "Turn Back the Pendulum 3"; -105. "Turn Back the Pendulum 4"; -104. "Turn Back the Pendulum 5"; -103. "Turn Back the Pendulum 6"; -102. "Turn Back the Pendulum 7"; -101. "Turn Back the Pendulum 8"; -100. "Turn Back the Pendulum 9"
A century and ten years before the start of the series, the Visards were originally Soul Reapers in the Soul Society. A Squad Five lieutenant at the time, Aizen learns from his captain Shinji Hirako that Kisuke Urahara will be a Squad Twelve Captain with the support of Squad Two Captain Yoruichi Shihōin. Despite the animosity towards him by his lieutenant Hiyori Sarugaki, Kisuke manages to win her respect, as he recruits an imprisoned Mayuri Kurotsuchi to help turn Squad Twelve into the science-based division it currently is. A few years later, several Soul Reapers began to disappear and Squad Nine, including Captain Kensei Muguruma and his lieutenant Mashiro Kuna. Soon after, a group consisting of Shinji, Soul Reaper captains Rōjūrō "Rose" Otoribashi and Love Aikawa, Squad Eight lieutenant Yadomaru Lisa, and Hachigen Ushōda of Kidō Corps, are dispatched. Despite Yamamoto refusing his request to visit the site, Urahara sends Hiyori to investigate in his stead. However, Shinji's group find Hiyori attacked by a hollowified Kensei and Mashiro. They subdue the Hollows, including Hiyori, but are suddenly incapacitated by Tōsen, except Shinji.
37	Beauty Is So Solitary	February 4, 2009; 978-4-08-874628-9	December 6, 2011; 978-1-4215-3314-8
-99. "Turn Back the Pendulum 10"; -98. "Turn Back the Pendulum 11"; -97. "Let Stop the Pendulum"; 316. "Swang the Edge Down"; 317. "Six Hearts Will Beat As One"; 318. "Five Towers/Four Pillars"; 319. "Ants And Dragons"; 320. "Beauty is So Solitary"; 321. "Black Briers and Brambles"; 322. "Oath Under the Rose"
Aizen reveals that he was behind the Soul Reaper disappearances and tells Shinji that his distrust made it easy for Aizen to place his captain under the effects of zanpakutō to make it seem like he was following Shinji the whole time. Holding to himself as the others start to hollowfy, Shinji was about to be killed by Aizen, but Urahara arrives with Tessai Tsukabishi of the Kidō Corps. After Aizen flees, Urahara and Tessai send Shinji and the others to his lab, where he fails to use the Hōgyoku and save them. Aizen uses Central Room #46 to arrest Urahara and Tessai for his crimes, while sentencing the Visards to death. However, Yoruichi frees Urahara and Tessai, as they and the Vizards decide to escape into the world of the living. In the present day, Ichigo reaches Orihime and Ulquiorra, with his friends holding off Rudbornn. At the fake Karakura Town, Yamamoto traps Aizen, Gin and Tōsen in a fire prison so his forces can focus on the Arrancars. The Espada Baraggan Louisenbairn takes over the invasion as he sends his four of his loyal Fracciones to destroy the four pillars protecting Karakura Town. But it leads to a fight with Izuzu Kira facing Avirama Redder, Ikkaku Madarame battling Choe Neng Poww, and Squad Nine lieutenant Shūhei Hisagi dealing with Findor Calius. Yumichika finds himself in a person battle with Charlotte Chuhlhourne, only managing by defeating his opponent by being able to use the true form of his Zanpakutō without compromising himself as a member of Squad Eleven.
38	Fear for Fight	April 3, 2009; 978-4-08-874649-4	February 7, 2012; 978-1-4215-3597-5
323. "Gloomy, Ghastly and Full of Despair" (Note: Before it was released in tankōbon 38, chapter 323 had no title.); 324. "The Reaper" (Note: When released in tankōbon 38, chapter 324 was renamed from "The Claws" to "The Reaper".); 325. "Fear For Fight" (Note: When released in tankōbon 38, chapter 325 was renamed from "Fear For The Fight'" to "Fear For Fight".); 326. "Knockdown Monster"; 327. "Knockdown Monsters"; 328. "The Knuckle Debate"; 329. "RAGING RAMPAGE"; 330. "CROSSING SWORDS"; 331. "Don't Believe the Hide"
Kira and Hisagi successfully defeat their opponents, Ikkaku's pride of not showing his bankai in public leads to his defeat as Choe Neng Poww destroys one of the four pillars protecting Karakura Town with Squad Seven lieutenant Tetsuzaemon Iba managing to stop the town from returning. Before Ikkaku is killed, Komamura confronts Poww and easily defeats him with his bankai. With the four Arrancars attacking Karakura dead, the top three Espada and their Fracciones confront the Soul Reaper captains and their lieutenants. While Rangiku faces Harribel's three Fracciones, Hitsugaya confronts Harribel herself. Meanwhile Captain Soi-Fong and her lieutenant Marechiyo Ōmaeda fight Baraggan's remaining two Fracciones Ggio Vega and Nirgge Parduoc with Ōmaeda managing to knock out his opponent.
39	El Verdugo	June 4, 2009; 978-4-08-874674-6	April 3, 2012; 978-1-4215-3598-2
332. "Stingy Stinger" (Note: When released in tankōbon 39, chapter 332 was renamed from "Fang & Sting" to "Stingy Stinger".); 333. "Ash & Salamander"; 334. "Dregs of Hypnosis"; 335. "chimaera chord"; 336. "El Verdugo"; 337. "Hall in Your Inferno"; 338. "Fall into My Inferno"; 339. "The Deathbringer Numbers"; 340. "The Antagonizer"
After receiving some unneeded help from Ōmaeda, Soi-Fong defeats Baraggan's last Fracción with Baraggan now joining the fray while revealing himself as Espada Two. Rangiku is initially overwhelm by Tier Halibel's three dysfunctional Fracciónes Emilou Apacci, Franceska Mila Rose, and Cyan Sung-Sun. Momo arrives to aid Rangiku, determine to fight her former captain Aizen. But Halibel's Fracciónes retaliate by sacrificing their left arms to conjure their "pet" Ayon to overwhelm the Soul Reapers before it was incinerated by Yamamoto. Witnessing Yamamoto knock out her subordinates, Harribel takes her frustrations for her comrades' defeat on Histugaya while revealing herself to be Espada Three. Elsewhere, leaving Jūshirō to reluctantly deal with the Espada's child-like Fracción Lilinette Gingerback, Kyōraku play battles Stark as he reveals himself to Espada One. Back in Hueco Mundo, Ichigo's battle with Ulquiorra properly gets underway with the two of them being more or less evenly matched.
40	The Lust	August 4, 2009; 978-4-08-874712-5	June 5, 2012; 978-1-4215-4137-2
341. "The Envy"; 342. "The Gluttony"; 343. "The Greed"; 344. "The Pride"; 345. "The Sloth"; 346. "The Wrath"; 347. "The Lust"; 348. "The Lust 2"; 349. "The Lust 3"
Orihime shields Ichigo from one of Ulquiorra's attacks, but Ichigo requests her to let him fight alone. While the battle continues, Loly Aivirrne and Menoly Mallia approach Orhime with the former intending to harm Orihime. But Yammy Riyalgo suddenly arrives, taking out Menoly and injuring Loly when Ulquiorra refuses to let him fight Ichigo. After being healed by Orihime again, Loly releases her zanpakutō to fight Yammy before he punches her through the wall and lets her fall, seemingly to her death. Yammy was about to attack Orihime when Uryū arrives and uses the mines he had got from Mayuri to drop Yammy all the way to ground level. With Uryū protecting Orihime, Ichigo uses his Hollow powers to confront Ulquiorra. However, after taking their fight to the top of Las Noches to activate his released form, Ulquiorra reveals his Resurrección Segunda Etapa before blowing a hole in Ichigo's chest. A horrified Orihime rushes to Ichigo's lifeless body, only to be blocked by Ulquiorra. Uryū intervenes and attempts a sneak attack yet fails, but he decides to buy Orihime time to heal Ichigo's wounds. Ulquiorra quickly overwhelms him while a distraught Orihime cries out for Ichigo. Orihime's lament breakdown unexpectedly triggers Ichigo to undergo a new transformation.
41	Heart	October 2, 2009; 978-4-08-874734-7	June 5, 2012; 978-1-4215-4138-9
350. "The Lust 4"; 351. "The Lust 5"; 352. "The Lust 6"; 353. "The Ash"; 354. "heart"; 355. "Azul-Blood Splash"; 356. "Tyrant of Skulls"; 357. "The Colossus of Fear"; 358. "King of the Clouds"
Now turned into a berserker Hollow, Ichigo attacks Ulquiorra until he is stopped by Uryū just before delivering the final blow. However, Ichigo sees his friends as enemies and stabs Uryū with his zanpakutō. Ulquiorra awakes and interrupts Ichigo from using his cero on Uryū, causing it to backfire on Ichigo and reverting him back to his normal self. Although Ulquiorra demands to have a rematch with Ichigo as he dying from overexerting himself, Ichigo felt such a victory to empty. While his body turns to ash, Ulquiorra remembers his conversations with Orihime and realizes he has grown a heart within himself. Ulquiorra asks Orihime if she is afraid of him, and she replies that she is not. Satisfied with her answer, Ulquiorra dissolves and fades into the winds. At the same time, Chad and Renji enable Rukia to defeat Rudbornn before they find themselves facing a furious Yammy as they learn, despite the 10 tattooe, that he is actually Espada Zero and thus the most powerful of the Espada. Meanwhile, in the fake Karakura Town, Suì-Fēng and Ōmaeda confront Baraggan with the former forced to sacrifice her arm when it was exposed to their opponent's decaying Respira mist after he entered his released state. Hitsugaya is also surpassed by Harribel's released state, and is forced to use the full power from his bankai to counterattack.
42	Shock of the Queen	December 4, 2009; 978-4-08-874762-0	July 3, 2012; 978-1-4215-4139-6
359. "The Frozen Obelisk"; 360. "Shock of the Queen"; 361. "I Hate Loneliness, But It Loves Me"; 362. "Howling Wolves"; 363. "Superchunky from Hell"; 364. "Grinning Revengers"; 365. "Whose Side Are We On"; 366. "The Revenger's High"; 367. "YOUR ENEMY IS MY ENEMY"
With their bankai, Hitsugaya freezes Harribel while Soi-Fong appears to have overpower Baraggan. Stark, interested to see Shunsui's bankai, Starrk releases his Zanpakutō Los Lobos by absorbing Lilynette, who is revealed to be part of his being. Jūshirō aids Shunsui against their opponent and his gunslinging fighting style. But things worsen when Wonderweiss arrives with a gigantic hollow named Hooleer. After stabbing Jūshirō while Stark shoots Kyōraku with a cero, Wonderweiss frees Harribel from her confinement while Hooler blows away the flames holding Aizen, Gin, and Tōsen. But the Vizards make an unsuspected arrival at the fake Karakura Town, Shinji explaining to Yamamoto that they are here only as enemies of Aizen before split up to each assist in each of the fights: Mashiro taking out Hooler before facing Wonderweiss, Lisa and Hiyori assisting Hitsugaya against Harribel, Hachi joining Soi-Fong and Ōmaeda against Baraggan, and Love and "Rose" taking on Starrk. Shinji attempts to face Aizen while Komamura faces Tōsen alongside Shūhei.
43	Kingdom of Hollows	February 4, 2010; 978-4-08-874794-1	July 3, 2012; 978-1-4215-4296-6
368. "The Fearless Child"; 369. "Spit on Your Own God"; 370. "Discussing Life from God's Perspective" (神の視座にて 命を論ず, Kami no Shiza nite Inochi o Ronzu); 371. "Kingdom of Hollows"; 372. "The Metal Cudgel Flinger"; 373. "Wolves Ain't Howl Alone"; 374. "Gray Wolf, Red Blood, Black Cloth, White Bone" (灰狼・赤血・黒衣・白骨, Kairō, Sekketsu, Kokui, Hakkotsu); 375. "EXecution, EXtinction"; 376. "EXecution, EXtinction 2"; 377. "Shout at the Dark"
Despite Suì-Fēng's reluctant for his help, Hachi makes a deal to trap Kisuke in a barrier for a month if she helps him by using her bankai to hit Baraggan. Baraggan survives, but furious that half of his face has been destroyed as he unleashes his Respira as it comes in contact with Hachi's right hand. However, in a gambit on the nature of their opponent's defense, Hachi removes his hand using a barrier and transports it inside Baraggan's body where the Espada begins to suffer his own power. In his final moments, remembering how he was once the ruler of Hueco Mundo until dethroned by Aizen, Baraggan makes a final attempt on Aizen. Though Stark's victory seems assured as Baraggan's death stirred him to take the fight seriously, Stark is unexpectedly killed by Shunsui. Meanwhile, Wonderweiss gets the upper hand against Mashiro before Kensei steps in to save her and takes her place. In a turn of events, having deeming the Espadas are too weak to serve him after witnessing Stark and Baraggan's deaths, Aizen decides to join the battle after dispatching Halibel and leaving her for dead. Despite Shinji's warning not to let Aizen's words get to them, Hiyori loses it and finds herself badly injured by Gin when she made an impulsive rushes towards Aizen.
44	Vice It	April 2, 2010; 978-4-08-870020-5	August 7, 2012; 978-1-4215-4297-3
378. "Eyes of the Victor"; 379. "Falta de Armonía" (Note: Before it was released in tankōbon 44, chapter 379 had no title.); 380. "Devil, Devil, Devil, Devil"; 381. "Words Just Don't Like You"; 382. "The United Front (Discordeque Mix)"; 383. "TOO EARLY TO TRUST"; 384. "Can't Fear Your Own Sword"; 385. "Vice It"; 386. "Bells Are Blue" (Note: When released in tankōbon 44, chapter 386 was renamed from "The Bestial" to "Bells Are Blue".)
Ichigo manages to reach where Rukia, Chad, and Renji were after Rukia was thrown by Yammy. Ichigo fins himself outmatched against Yammy as Byakuya and Kenpachi arrive and hold off the Espada while Ichigo is instructed to return to the world of the living through alongside Unohana to face Aizen. But as Kenpachi and Byakuya argue over which of them is stronger, a furious Yammy reveals his ability to increase his power through his rage. While heading for the world of the living through the Garganta opened by Mayuri, Ichigo learns from Unohana that he is the Soul Society's trump against Aizen as he is the only combatant who is not under the effect of Aizen's zanpakutō. In the meantime, after Gin had injured Hiyori, Shinji starts fighting Aizen in a battle of sensory manipulation. At the same time, Tōsen reveals he deliberately underwent Hollowfication with a disheartened Komamura using his bankai which is revealed to be a weakness. Tōsen then explains his warped ideals for justice as he eventually uses a resurrección to assume an insect hollow form. Though he overpowers Komamura, Tōsen's excitement of seeing leaves him open to Hisagi, who releases his zanpakutō and slices his former captain through the neck.
45	The Burnout Inferno	June 4, 2010; 978-4-08-870046-5	August 7, 2012; 978-1-4215-4298-0
387. "Ignited"; 388. "Eagle Without Wings 2 (EXTREME BATTLEMASTERS MIX)"; 389. "WINGED EAGLES 2"; 390. "BEYOND THE DEATH UNDERSTANDING"; 391. "The Blazing Glaciers"; 392. "The Breaking Glaciers"; 393. "The Burnout Inferno"; 394. "The Burnout Inferno 2"; 395. "The Burnout Inferno 3"
His humanity restored, the defeated Tōsen comes to his senses and requests to see Hisagi's face one last time. However, Tōsen dies when Aizen causes an internal impact that destroys his defeated ally's body. By that time, Ichigo and Unohana arrive to the fake Karakura Town. Ichigo's first attempt to kill Aizen fails, but the remaining captains and Visoreds jump to his defense, attempting to keep Ichigo from failing under Aizen's spell while giving him an opening that will finish the fight. But the plan falls apart when Aizen provokes Histugaya to attack him, allowing him to defeat the Soul Reapers and Visards single-handedly. This forces Yamamoto to join the fray, allowing Aizen to stab him so he can hold the opponent while preparing to incinerate both of them. But Wonderweiss appears and extinguishes Yamamoto's flames, Aizen revealing he created the Arrancar for the purpose to nullify Ryūjin Jakka. Yamamoto manages to shatter Wonderweiss's body, only to be forced to risk his life to contain the explosion from his flames bursting from the remains. However, Yamamoto manages to catch Aizen off-guard and wound him. As Aizen manages to get away relatively unscathed, Ichigo attacks him.
46	Back From Blind	August 4, 2010; 978-4-08-870085-4	September 4, 2012; 978-1-4215-4299-7
396. "THE BITE"; 397. "Edge of the Silence"; 398. "BACK FROM BLIND"; 399. "DEICIDE"; 400. "DEICIDE 2"; 401. "DEICIDE 3"; 402. "DEICIDE 4"; 403. "DEICIDE 5"; 404. "DEICIDE 6"
Although Ichigo's attack wounds him, Aizen reveals that he fused the Hōgyoku into his body as it heals his injuries. Aizen then presents a revelation that all of Ichigo's fights since meeting Rukia have all been arranged by him that he had known long before he was born. But before Aizen could reveal Ichigo's true nature, Isshin intervenes. After putting some distance along with Ichigo from Aizen, Isshin tries to tell his son that he will reveal what Aizen was about to tell him, but Ichigo tells him that there is no need for that. As Ichigo deals with Gin and his bankai Kamishini no Yari, Isshin faces Aizen as the latter begins to transform while explaining that the Hōgyoku's true power is granting the wish of its possessor. Even with Urahara and Yoruichi joining Isshin, their efforts are ineffective as Aizen continues to slowly evolve. Meanwhile, a wounded Rangiku is running towards Gin.
47	End of the Chrysalis Age	October 4, 2010; 978-4-08-870110-3	September 4, 2012; 978-1-4215-4300-0
405. "DEICIDE 7"; 406. "DEICIDE 8 end of the Chrysalis Age"; 407. "DEICIDE 9"; 408. "DEICIDE 10"; 409. "DEICIDE 11"; 410. "DEICIDE 12"; 411. "DEICIDE 13"; 412. "DEICIDE 14"; 413. "DEICIDE 15"
After the Hōgyoku completes his evolution, Aizen defeats his opponents before leaving with Gin to the real Karakura. Isshin takes Ichigo to the Dangai dimensional route between the Soul Society and the world of the living where time is slower. After realizing Aizen had destroyed the Dangai's cleaner, Isshin decides to teach Ichigo the means to obtain the Final Getsuga Tenshō by using the dimension's time for a three-month training that will last an hour outside the Dangai. To begin the training, Ichigo goes into his inner world to learn the ultimate technique from Zangetsu. But dealing with Zangetsu in his younger Tensa Zangetsu state, Ichigo finds himself also facing his inner Hollow's bankai state as the two entities combine into their true form as the personification of Ichigo's full power. In the real Karakura, Aizen goes after Ichigo's friends to kill them before creating the Ōken while Rangiku confronts Gin overs his reasons for betraying the Soul Society. But Gin seemingly stabs Rangiku before returning to Aizen's side.
48	God Is Dead	December 3, 2010; 978-4-08-870144-8	October 2, 2012; 978-1-4215-4301-7
414. "DEICIDE 16"; 415. "DEICIDE 17"; 416. "DEICIDE 18 (THE END)"; 417. "DEICIDE 19"; 418. "DEICIDE 20"; 419. "DEICIDE 21 (Transcendent God Rock)"; 420. "DEICIDE 22"; 421. "DEICIDE 23"; 422. "the silent victory"; 423. "Bleach My Soul" (Note: When released in tankōbon 48, chapter 423 was renamed from "Farewell Swords" to "Bleach My Soul".)
Revealing that he feigned loyalty to Aizen, having vowed to kill him for nearly killing Rangiku ages ago, Gin reveals that he waited for years to understand how to counter Aizen's zanpakutō while also misleading him on how his own bankai works and leaves him for dead while taking the Hōgyoku. However, still bounded to the Hōgyoku, Aizen evolves into a new form as he easily cuts Gin down. Seeing Ichigo a different person now, Gin dies in peace while content with what he had done. Although Ichigo easily overpowers Aizen as they take their fight outside Karakura, having discarded his spirit pressure for physical strength, Aizen evolves into a hollow-like creature. Although Aizen renders Ichigo's left arm useless, Ichigo uses the last resort technique that he learned from Tensa Zangetsu: The Final Getsuga Tenshō. Ichigo uses the Mugetsu with the knowledge that its use will cost him his Soul Reaper powers as he defeats Aizen. Though Aizen survived and was about to kill the weakened Ichigo, he finds himself reverted to his human form by the Hōgyoku no longer acknowledging him while engulfed in a specially made kidō "Seal" that Urahara planted on him. Ten days later, after Aizen has been sentenced to Muken for 20 millennia, Ichigo gradually begins to lose his Soul Reaper powers. Before being unable to see Rukia, Ichigo says his goodbyes and thanks to her.
