= Bleach season 8 =

Season of television series

Bleach
- Season 8
- The cover of the fourth DVD compilation released by Aniplex of The Arrancar: The Fierce Fight arc, featuring Grimmjow Jaegerjaquez
- No. of episodes: 16

Release
- Original network: TV Tokyo
- Original release: December 12, 2007 – April 16, 2008

Season chronology
- ← Previous; Season 7 Next → Season 9

The eighth season of the Bleach anime series is named the Arrancar: The Fierce Fight arc (破面・激闘篇, Arankaru Gekitō Hen). The episodes are directed by Noriyuki Abe, and produced by TV Tokyo, Dentsu, and Studio Pierrot. The season adapts Tite Kubo's Bleach manga series from the 29th volume to the 32nd volume (chapters 252–286). The season follows Ichigo Kurosaki reuniting with Orihime Inoue, while his friends fight the Espadas, the strongest version of the Arrancar sent by Sousuke Aizen.

The season aired from December 2007 to April 2008. The English adaptation of the Bleach anime is licensed by Viz Media, and the season aired on Cartoon Network's Adult Swim from September to November 2009. Four DVD compilations, each containing four episodes of the season, were released by Aniplex between May 28 and August 27, 2008. Viz Media released the season in two separate DVD boxes on June 21 and September 6, 2011, respectively. The first box, however, also contains episodes from the previous season.

The episodes use three pieces of theme music: one opening theme and two closing themes. The opening theme is "After Dark" by Asian Kung-Fu Generation. The first closing theme is Kousuke Atari's "Tane o Maku Hibi" (種をまく日々; lit. 'Seed-Scattering Days'), which switches in episode 154 to "Kansha." (感謝。; lit. 'Gratitude.') by RSP. To promote the second Bleach featured film, Bleach: The DiamondDust Rebellion, the opening and closing credits for episode 152 to 154 use footage from the film, which was released on December 22, 2007.

== Episodes ==
No. overall	No. in season	Title	Storyboarded by	Directed by	Written by	Original release date	English air date
152	1	"Ichigo Strikes Back! This Is My Bankai"; Transliteration: "Ichigo Hangeki! Koitsu ga Ore no Bankai da" (Japanese: 一護反撃！こいつが俺の卍解だ)	Yasuhito Nishikata	Tomoko Hiramuki	Masashi Sogo	December 12, 2007	September 27, 2009
Ichigo Kurosaki continues his fight with the Privaron Espada Dordonii Alessandro Del Socacchio, and Dordonii easily overpowers Ichigo, leading him to demand that Ichigo use his bankai. Ichigo refuses and Dordonii uses a cero blast in response. Nelliel Tu Odelschwanck blocks the blast by swallowing it and fires it back at Dordonii. When Dordonii attacks Nel, Ichigo uses his bankai to stop the attack. However, Dordonii requests that Ichigo use his hollow powers to fight him. Ichigo dons his hollow mask and disables Dordonii with a single strike. Nel heals Dordonii with her saliva at Ichigo's request, and Dordonii explains that he had hoped to regain his position as a full Espada by defeating Ichigo at full power. After being completely healed, he attacks Ichigo again.
153	2	"The Devilish Research! Szayelaporro's Plan"; Transliteration: "Akuma no Kenkyū! Zaeruaporo no Takurami" (Japanese: 悪魔の研究！ザエルアポロの企み)	Takeshi Shirai Natsuko Suzuki	Mitsutaka Noshitani	Masashi Sogo	December 19, 2007	October 4, 2009
Dordonii is struck down by Ichigo once again, and to thank Ichigo for using his full power against him, Dordonii fights Rudbornn Chelute and the Exequias, a group of arrancars specializing in eliminating intruders, to allow Ichigo to retreat. When Sousuke Aizen learns of this, he asks who ordered the Exequias to attack Ichigo, and the Espada Szayelaporro Grantz takes responsibility. Aizen forgives him, noting that Dordonii's body will help Szayelaporro's research. Meanwhile, Uryū Ishida is battling the Privaron Espada Cirucci Sanderwicci, and Rukia encounters the Espada Aaroniero Arruruerie. Aaroniero removes his mask, revealing the face of Kaien Shiba, the former lieutenant of the thirteenth division that Rukia had killed.
154	3	"Rukia and Kaien, the Sorrowful Reunion"; Transliteration: "Rukia to Kaien, Kanashimi no Saikai" (Japanese: ルキアと海燕、哀しみの再会)	Hitoyuki Matsui	Yasuo Iwamoto	Rika Nakase	December 26, 2007	October 4, 2009
Rukia converses with Aaroniero, and realizes that he is the real Kaien, who states that after he was killed, he was resurrected in Hueco Mundo, where he became one of Aizen's Espadas. Kaien offers Rukia a chance to atone for killing him by allowing him to kill her, and Rukia accepts, with the caveat that she will be allowed to rescue Orihime Inoue. Kaien reveals that he was joking, and instead, instructs her to kill all of her friends. Realizing that he is an imposter, Rukia begins to fight Kaien, and Kaien quickly gains the upper hand, as he was the one who taught Rukia how to fight.
155	4	"Rukia Retaliates! Release the Desperate Kidō"; Transliteration: "Rukia Hangeki! Kesshi no Kidō o Hanate" (Japanese: ルキア反撃！決死の鬼道を放て)	Masami Anno	Mitsue Yamazaki	Masahiro Ōkubo	January 9, 2008	October 11, 2009
Rukia continues to struggle against Kaien, and he begins to overpower her when he uses the shikai of his zanpakutō. When Kaien disarms her, Rukia attempts to use a kidō spell, and reveals in the process that Kaien is afraid of the sunlight. Armed with this knowledge, Rukia binds Kaien with kidō and blasts a hole in the wall. In the sunlight, Kaien's face melts away to reveal a glass case with two masks inside. The creature reintroduces himself as Aaroniero, and after moving out of the sunlight, assumes Kaien's appearance again. After informing Rukia that he absorbed Kaien's remains when he came to Hueco Mundo, Aaroniero releases his zanpakutō, transforming his lower body into a giant, octopus-like form.
156	5	"Ishida & Pesche, the United Attack of Friendship"; Transliteration: "Ishida & Pesshe, Yūjō no Gattai Kōgeki" (Japanese: 石田&ペッシェ、友情の合体攻撃)	Masami Shimoda	Hodaka Kuramoto	Natsuko Takahashi	January 16, 2008	October 11, 2009
Uryū continues to battle with Cirucci, who blocks all of his attacks with her zanpakutō. The arrancar Pesche Guatiche decides to help Uryū, and uses his saliva to cause Cirucci to trip and land awkwardly on the ground. Incensed, Cirucci releases her zanpakutō, referred to as Resurrección, transforming into a giant bird with bladed wings. Unable to counter her abilities with his arrows alone, Uryū pulls one of the tubes from his belt, which produces a powerful energy blade that easily slices through her winged blades.
157	6	"Ishida's Trump Card, Seele Schneider"; Transliteration: "Ishida no Kirifuda, Tamashii o Kirisaku Mono" (Japanese: 石田の切り札、魂を切り裂くもの)	Shigenori Kageyama	Hiroaki Nishimura	Masashi Sogo	January 23, 2008	October 18, 2009
With his energy sword, which he calls Seele Schneider, Uryū is easily able to defend himself against Cirucci's attacks. In response, Cirucci sheds her wings and focuses all her power into a single blade on her tail, and Uryū defeats her by shooting his Seele Schneider from his bow into her chest. As Uryū and Pesche leave, Rudbornn and the Exequias arrive to kill Cirucci. Meanwhile, Yasutora "Chad" Sado is at a disadvantage against the Privaron Espada Gantenbainne Mosqueda. After taking several blows, Chad realizes how to access his full power, transforming his right arm into a giant shield named Brazo Derecho del Gigante.
158	7	"Right Arm of the Giant, Left Arm of the Devil"; Transliteration: "Kyojin no Uwan, Akuma no Sawan" (Japanese: 巨人の右腕、悪魔の左腕)	Jun'ya Koshiba	Yukio Okazaki	Masashi Sogo	January 30, 2008	October 18, 2009
With his full power unleashed, Chad overpowers Gantenbainne, and Gantenbainne releases his zanpakutō in response. However, Chad reveals that his right arm is intended solely for defense, and transforms his left arm, naming it Brazo Izquierdo del Diablo. With his left arm, Chad overpowers Gantenbainne and allows him to live. However, Chad is confronted by the Espada Nnoitora Gilga, and after Chad fruitlessly attacks Nnoitora with his left arm, Nnoitora defeats and seriously wounds Chad with a single attack.
159	8	"Yasutora Sado Dies! Orihime's Tears"; Transliteration: "Sado Yasutora Shisu! Orihime no Namida" (Japanese: 茶渡泰虎死す！織姫の涙)	Shigenori Kageyama	Kiyomu Fukuda	Rika Nakase	February 6, 2008	October 25, 2009
Bored with the ease of his victory, Nnoitora leaves to pursue another intruder. Chad's apparent death is felt by everyone in Hueco Mundo, and when Espada Ulquiorra Schiffer brings dinner to Orihime Inoue, she refuses to believe that Chad has died. Ulquiorra admonishes her, noting that all her friends are doomed to fail because they rushed into battle without realizing the odds they faced. Orihime slaps him, and bursts into tears after Ulquiorra leaves. Meanwhile, Renji Abarai and Dondochakka Bilstin encounter Szayelaporro. Renji attempts to use his bankai, but it shatters instantly, leading Szayelaporro to remark that he designed the room they are in to negate Renji's bankai. As this is happening, Rukia continues to battle Aaroniero, who reveals that he has eaten and obtained the powers of over 33,650 hollows.
160	9	"Testament, Your Heart is Right Here..."; Transliteration: "Yuigon, Kokoro wa Koko ni..." (Japanese: 遺言、心はここに…)	Masami Anno	Mitsutaka Noshitani	Genki Yoshimura	February 13, 2008	October 25, 2009
Overwhelmed by Aaroniero's released form, as well as the realization that he possesses Kaien's actual body, Rukia is impaled through the stomach, and her zanpakutō, Sode no Shirayuki, is broken in the process. She recalls her training with Kaien, in which he told her how a person's heart is passed on to those they are close to. Regaining her resolve, she performs the third dance San No Mai Shirafune, reconstructing her zanpakutō with ice and impales Aaroniero through the head. As Aaroniero dies, Rukia attempts to stand in order to continue her journey to save Orihime, but collapses from her injuries.
161	10	"The Cruel Arrancar, Ulquiorra's Provocation"; Transliteration: "Zankoku na Arankaru, Urukiora no Chōhatsu" (Japanese: 残酷な破面、ウルキオラの挑発)	Masami Shimoda	Tomoko Hiramuki	Masahiro Ōkubo	February 20, 2008	Noviembre 1, 2009
When Renji asks Szayelaporro how he negated his bankai, Szayelaporro reveals that he gathered the data using parasites stored in the body of his older brother Ilfort Grantz, who Renji fought and defeated. With only his shikai, Renji's attacks cannot harm Szayelaporro. Meanwhile, Ulquiorra meets Ichigo to inform him of Rukia's death. Ichigo attempts to leave to save Rukia, but Ulquiorra goads him into fighting by revealing that he was the person who forced Orihime to come to Hueco Mundo. Furious, Ichigo uses his bankai, dons his hollow mask and prepares to fight Ulquiorra in anger.
162	11	"Szayelaporro Laughs, The Net Trapping Renji is Complete"; Transliteration: "Warau Zaeruaporo, Renji Hōimō Kansei" (Japanese: 笑うザエルアポロ、恋次包囲網完成)	Jun Kamiya	Hodaka Kuramoto	Michiko Yokote	February 27, 2008	November 1, 2009
Even after using his most powerful attacks, Ichigo is overpowered by Ulquiorra. Ichigo, however, refuses to give up, believing Ulquiorra to be the top-ranked Espada. Ulquiorra reveals his "4" tattoo, indicating that he is the Fourth Espada, and stabs Ichigo in the chest with his hand, telling Ichigo to either escape from Hueco Mundo or die. Meanwhile, Orihime is confronted by Loly Aivirrne and Menoly Mallia, two female arrancar furious because Aizen favors Orihime over them. In Renji's fight with Szayelaporro. Renji is almost killed by Szayelaporro's strongest Fracción Medazeppi when he is struck by an arrow from a mysterious person, killing him. The mysterious person mocks Renji for almost being killed before Renji identifies the mysterious person as Uryū.
163	12	"Shinigami and Quincy, The Battle with Madness"; Transliteration: "Shinigami to Kuinshī, Kyōki to no Tatakai" (Japanese: 死神とクインシー、狂気との戦い)	Shigenori Kageyama	Kiyomu Fukuda	Masahiro Ōkubo	March 5, 2008	November 8, 2009
Orihime is rescued from Loly and Menoly by Espada Grimmjow Jeagerjaques, who claims he is repaying Orihime for restoring his arm and promptly kills Menoly and injures Loly. He tells Orihime that he needs her help, and takes her with him. However, Orihime chose to heal both Loly and Menoly before they leave. Meanwhile, Uryū finds that his arrival was expected by Szayelaporro, and his attacks are useless against both the Espada and his Fracciones. Renji saves Uryū from a fatal blow, and the two prepare to work together to take down Szayelaporro.
164	13	"Ishida's Strategy, 20-Second Offense and Defense"; Transliteration: "Ishida no Sakusen, Nijūbyō no Kōbō" (Japanese: 石田の作戦、20秒の攻防)	Masami Shimoda	Yasuhito Nishikata	Genki Yoshimura	March 12, 2008	November 8, 2009
With Renji's help, Uryū maneuvers Szayelaporro into a trap, catching him in a massive explosion. Although the trap is damaging, it fails to kill Szayelaporro. By eating one of his Fracciones Lumina, Szayelaporro completely heals himself. However, rather than retaliate, he leaves, wanting to replace his damaged clothing and to allow Renji and Uryū to formulate a new plan. Elsewhere, Grimmjow brings Orihime to Ichigo, and asks Orihime to heal Ichigo so he can fight him again. Before she can finish doing so, Ulquiorra arrives.
165	14	"The Murderous Intent Boils! The Joyful Grimmjow"; Transliteration: "Satsui Futtō! Kanki no Gurimujō" (Japanese: 殺意沸騰！歓喜のグリムジョー)	Masami Shimoda	Akira Shimizu	Michiko Yokote	March 19, 2008	November 15, 2009
Using a special device, Grimmjow traps Ulquiorra in an alternate dimension, and remarks that it will take two or three hours for Ulquiorra to break free. Orihime finishes healing Ichigo, and Ichigo begins to fight Grimmjow. Even after using his bankai, Ichigo finds himself outmatched against Grimmjow. However, when Grimmjow fires a Grand Rey Cero at Orihime and Nel, Ichigo uses his hollow mask to block the attack. Glad that Ichigo is using his full power, Grimmjow releases his zanpaktou called Pantera and prepares to fight Ichigo.
166	15	"Desperate Effort vs. Desperate Effort! Hollowfied Ichigo"; Transliteration: "Shiryoku vs. Shiryoku! Horōkashita Ichigo" (Japanese: 死力VS死力！ホロウ化した一護)	Tetsuhito Saitō	Kazunori Mizuno	Natsuko Takahashi	April 9, 2008	November 15, 2009
Grimmjow, pleased that Ichigo is fighting with his full power, releases his zanpakutō. The two continue their fight, and Ichigo is slowly worn down by Grimmjow despite the fact that he is able to use his hollow mask longer than he previously could. Espada Tia Halibel and her Fracciones, the Tres Bestias (which consists of Emilou Apacci, Franceska Mila Rose and Cyan Sung-Sun), are seen watching the fight and comment during it. Halibel tells them that it is natural that they are afraid of Grimmjow and Ichigo, that it is more like a fight between two Espadas than anything else. Orihime, frightened by Ichigo's appearance due to his hollow mask, is afraid to watch the battle, but after Nel admonishes her, she overcomes her fear and cheers Ichigo on, giving him the resolve to deal a blow across Grimmjow's chest.
167	16	"The Moment of Conclusion, The End of Grimmjow"; Transliteration: "Ketchaku no Toki, Gurimujō no Saigo" (Japanese: 決着の時、グリムジョーの最後)	Jun'ya Koshiba	Hiroaki Nishimura	Masashi Sogo	April 16, 2008	November 22, 2009
In a flashback, Grimmjow recalls his time as a hollow, and his history with Shawlong Qufang, Edorad Leones, Ilfort Grantz, Nakim Greendina and D-Roy Linker, his former Fracciones. In the present, Grimmjow, despite being wounded, refuses to give up. He uses his strongest attack on Ichigo, but Ichigo overcomes it and deals a final blow. After leaving Grimmjow on the ground, Ichigo prepares to take Orihime away from Las Noches.
