= Bleach season 7 =

Season of television series

Bleach
- Season 7
- The cover of the fifth DVD compilation released by Aniplex of The Arrancar: The Hueco Mundo Sneak Entry arc, featuring Orihime Inoue and Ulquiorra Schiffer.
- No. of episodes: 20

Release
- Original network: TV Tokyo
- Original release: July 4 – December 5, 2007

Season chronology
- ← Previous; Season 6 Next → Season 8

The seventh season of the Bleach anime series is named the Arrancar: The Hueco Mundo Sneak Entry arc (破面・虚圏 潜入篇, Arankaru Weko Mundo Sennyū Hen). In the English adaptation of the anime released by Viz Media, the title of the season is translated as The Hueco Mundo. The episodes are directed by Noriyuki Abe, and produced by TV Tokyo, Dentsu, and Studio Pierrot. The season adapts Tite Kubo's Bleach manga series from the rest of the 26th volume to the 28th volume (chapters 229–251), with the exception of episodes 132–137 (filler) and 147–149 (canon expansion). The season follows Ichigo Kurosaki and his friends heading to Hueco Mundo on a journey to save Orihime Inoue, when she was kidnapped by the Arrancar under the command of Sousuke Aizen. Although a small story arc focused on the character Ashido Kanō was not featured in the manga as was originally intended due to timing issues, Kubo helped the anime staff produce the episodes for it.

The season aired from July to December 2007. The English adaptation of the Bleach anime is licensed by Viz Media, and the season aired from July to September 2009 on Cartoon Network's Adult Swim in the United States. Five DVD compilations, each containing four episodes of the season, were released by Aniplex between December 19, 2007, and April 23, 2008, in Japan. While Viz Media released a single DVD volume on September 21, 2010, featuring the season's first episodes, the entire season has only been released within others DVDs. Episodes 132 and 133 were also released in Viz's seventh English DVD box on December 21, 2010. Episodes 134–145 were released on March 22, 2011, as Viz's eighth compilation while the remaining ones were released on June 21, 2011. Manga Entertainment released the first volume from the season on September 26, 2011, while the second one is due to October 17, 2011. A collection of the two volumes was released on December 12, 2011.

The episodes use four pieces of theme music: two opening themes and two closing themes. The opening themes are "Alones" by Aqua Timez, used for the first twelve episodes, and "After Dark" by Asian Kung-Fu Generation, used for the remaining episodes. The ending themes are "Daidai" (橙; lit. 'Bitter Orange') by Chatmonchy, utilized for episodes 132 to 143, and J-pop singer Kousuke Atari's "Tane o Maku Hibi" (種をまく日々; lit. Seed-Scattering Days), used for the rest of the episodes. To promote the second Bleach featured film, Bleach: The DiamondDust Rebellion, the opening and closing credits for episode 151 use footage from the film, which was released on December 22, 2007.

== Episodes ==
No. overall	No. in season	Title	Storyboarded by	Directed by	Written by	Original release date	English air date
132	1	"Hitsugaya, Karin, and Soccer Ball"; Transliteration: "Hitsugaya to Karin to Sakkā Bōru" (Japanese: 日番谷と夏梨とサッカーボール)	Tetsuhito Saitō	Noriyuki Abe Yasuhito Nishikata	Rika Nakase	July 4, 2007	July 12, 2009
Karin Kurosaki meets Tōshirō Hitsugaya when she is playing soccer in the streets. Karin discovers that older students are using a soccer field for practice during a time slot that her team had booked. After a confrontation, the two teams decide to have a soccer match for control of the field. Karin asks Hitsugaya to join, but he refuses. However, he notes that she can see hollows and goes to the match. In the match, Karin injures her knee, prompting Hitsugaya to enter the game to help her. After the game is over, a hollow enters the area, and Hitsugaya easily defeats it. Realizing that Hitsugaya is a Soul Reaper, Karin questions Hitsugaya about her brother, Ichigo Kurosaki, and Hitsugaya assuages her fears concerning Ichigo's location.
133	2	"Ikkaku: The Hot-Blooded Kendo Tale"; Transliteration: "Ikkaku, Nekketsu Kendō Monogatari" (Japanese: 一角、熱血剣道物語)	Kazunori Mizuno	Kazunori Mizuno (Note: Credited under the pen name "Ōkura Shirakawa" (白川 巨椋, Shirakawa Ōkura).)	Natsuko Takahashi	July 11, 2007	July 19, 2009
Keigo Asano's sister Mizuho asks Ikkaku Madarame to help train a group of kendo students at his school. Ikkaku's brutal training causes most of the team to quit, except for a boy named Shinji, who is dedicated to become stronger. To recruit more team members, Ikkaku asks his fellow Soul Reapers Hitsugaya and Renji Abarai to participate in the kendo tournament. The Soul Reapers easily defeat their opponents. However, a hollow appears nearby, forcing them to leave in order to fight it. Shinji fights the final opponent in the tournament, and manages to defeat him as Ikkaku kills the hollow. Ikkaku, enraged at having missed an opportunity to fight, proceeds to attack the entire opposing team on his own.
134	3	"The Beautiful Patissier, Yumichika!"; Transliteration: "Utsukushiki Patishie, Yumichika!" (Japanese: 美しきパティシエ、弓親！)	Takeshi Shirai Hodaka Kuramoto Yasuhito Nishikata	Kiyomu Fukuda	Masashi Sogo	July 18, 2007	July 19, 2009
Twelfth division Soul Reaper Rin Tsubokura is sent to Karakura Town to conduct research, and Hanatarō Yamada accompanies him as an escort. Yumichika Ayasegawa, one of the Soul Reapers based in the real world, is assigned as their guide. While Rin searches for sweets to purchase, they encounter the ghost of a chef who wants the three Soul Reapers to bake a cake for his mother. Upon delivering the cake, however, the chef's mother refuses to eat it because it reminds her of her son, causing the chef to begin transforming into a hollow. Attracted by the chef's transformation, a Menos Grande arrives, and Hanatarō is able to both stop the chef's transformation and defeat the Menos Grande with the shikai of his zanpakutō. Using a device, Rin makes the chef visible to his mother, and he convinces her to eat the cake.
135	4	"Kon is Deceived! Rangiku on the Lookout..."; Transliteration: "Hakarareta Kon! Rangiku wa Mite Ita..." (Japanese: はかられたコン！乱菊は見ていた…)	Jun'ya Koshiba	Takeshi Shirai	Masahiro Ōkubo	July 25, 2007	July 26, 2009
After encountering Rangiku Matsumoto, Kon rescues a girl named Miyuki from drowning. In the process, however, Kon is swapped with Shintarō, the girl's stuffed animal. Kon attempts to talk to Miyuki, who requests that Kon play with her, as she has no friends outside her house. Kon asks her to bring him to her old house, where Kon learns that "Shintarō" is the name of her old dog and a two-headed dog hollow attacks them. Rangiku kills the hollow, which is revealed to be Shintarō's soul along with a Doberman Pinscher's soul which combined with it to make the hollow. Afterwards, Kon insists that Miyuki stop relying on him and make friends of her own.
136	5	"Civil War in Hueco Mundo! Ulquiorra's Death"; Transliteration: "Weko Mundo Nairan! Urukiora no Shi" (Japanese: ウェコムンド内乱！ウルキオラの死)	Noriyuki Abe Yasuhito Nishikata	Yukio Okazaki	Masashi Sogo	August 8, 2007	July 26, 2009
In Hueco Mundo, an arrancar named Patros and his two subordinates steal the Orb of Distortion, and kill Espada Ulquiorra Schiffer in the process. Unwilling to continue taking orders from former Soul Reaper Sousuke Aizen, Patros wishes to use the Orb of Distortion to take control of Las Noches. To this end, he heads for the shop of Kisuke Urahara, as he believes someone in the shop knows how to use the orb. Patros begins to fight Renji, who is staying at Urahara's shop. Meanwhile, the other Soul Reapers fight Patros' subordinates. As the two sides battle, Ulquiorra appears in the real world with no signs of his previous injuries.
137	6	"The Malicious Battle, Aizen's Trap"; Transliteration: "Akui no Tatakai, Aizen no Wana" (Japanese: 悪意の戦い、藍染の罠)	Manabu Fukazawa	Hodaka Kuramoto	Masashi Sogo	August 22, 2007	August 2, 2009
In Hueco Mundo, Ulquiorra's staged death and the theft of the Orb of Distortion are revealed to be a ploy by Aizen, engineered using his illusion-casting zanpakutō. In the real world, Patros' subordinates are defeated, and Renji uses his bankai, forcing Patros to release his zanpakutō. Patros begins to overwhelm Renji and reveals the secret of his attacks to the modified soul Lirin. Lirin, Kurōdo and Noba prevent Patros from using his attacks, and Renji defeats him. Meanwhile, Ulquiorra delivers a report to Aizen, noting that Orihime Inoue is currently not in the real world.
138	7	"Hueco Mundo moves again! Hitsugaya vs. Yammy"; Transliteration: "Weko Mundo Saidō! Hitsugaya VS Yamī" (Japanese: ウェコムンド再動！日番谷VSヤミー)	Motosuke Takahashi	Jun'ya Koshiba	Michiko Yokote	August 29, 2007	August 2, 2009
In Hueco Mundo, Aizen creates the arrancar Wonderweiss Margera with the Orb of Distortion, and Aizen tasks Ulquiorra with gathering arrancars for a mission. Meanwhile, Ichigo's training with the Vizards has enabled him to use his hollow mask for eleven seconds. In Soul Society, Soul Reapers Jūshirō Ukitake and Shūhei Hisagi observe Orihime and Rukia Kuchiki, who are training for the winter war with Aizen. In the real world, Yumichika and Rangiku are training in an attempt to achieve bankai when the arrancars Luppi Antenor, Grimmjow Jaegerjaquez, Yammy Riyalgo and Wonderweiss attack. Ichigo encounters Grimmjow and uses his bankai. In the training room beneath the Urahara shop, Urahara prepares to leave to enter the battle.
139	8	"Ichigo vs. Grimmjow, the 11-second battle!" Transliteration: "Ichigo VS Gurimujō, Jū-ichi Byō no tatakai!" (Japanese: 一護VSグリムジョー、11秒の戦い)	Tetsuhito Saitō Natsuko Suzuki	Mitsutaka Noshitani	Masashi Sogo	September 5, 2007	August 9, 2009
Ichigo dons his hollow mask, and overwhelms Grimmjow with his enhanced power. However, Ichigo is unable to defeat Grimmjow in his eleven-second limit, and Grimmjow takes the advantage. Meanwhile, Hitsugaya battles Yammy, and Luppi demands that Yammy retreat so he can fight all the Soul Reapers present. Luppi releases his zanpakutō, sprouting eight tentacles from his back, and after knocking Hitsugaya into the ground, captures all of the Soul Reapers. Before he can dispatch Rangiku, Urahara arrives, cutting one of his tentacles, and begins to fight Yammy. In Soul Society, as Orihime crosses into the real world, Ulquiorra attacks her. He severely injures her Soul Reaper guards and demands that she leave with him or he will kill all her friends.
140	9	"Ulquiorra's Scheme, the Moment when the Sun Sets!"; Transliteration: "Sakubō no Urukiora, Taiyō ga Shizumu Toki" (Japanese: 策謀のウルキオラ、太陽が沈む時)	Jun'ya Koshiba	Yasuhito Nishikata	Masashi Sogo	September 12, 2007	August 9, 2009
As the battle with Luppi continues, Hitsugaya uses a sneak attack with his bankai and defeats Luppi. Meanwhile, Urahara dodges Yammy's attacks using one of his inventions, and subsequently nullifies all of them. Grimmjow nearly kills Ichigo, but is saved by Rukia. She is nearly killed, but Shinji Hirako saves her. Grimmjow begins to battle Hirako, and after Hirako dons his hollow mask, he overwhelms Grimmjow. As Grimmjow prepares to release his zanpakutō, Ulquiorra stops him and orders all the arrancars to return to Hueco Mundo, as Orihime agreed to accompany him.
141	10	"Goodbye..., Kurosaki!"; Transliteration: "Sayonara..., Kurosaki-kun!" (Japanese: さようなら…、黒崎くん)	Hiroki Takagi	Tomoko Hiramuki	Rika Nakase	September 19, 2007	August 16, 2009
Ulquiorra gives Orihime twelve hours to say goodbye to one person, and provides her with a bracelet that makes her invisible. Orihime travels through Karakura Town, watching her friends from a distance. She then visits Ichigo, who is recovering from the injuries Grimmjow inflicted on him. She makes a confession of her love to the sleeping Ichigo. She almost kisses him but cannot bring herself to do it. Before leaving the real world, she writes a line in a notebook, "Goodbye, halcyon days".
142	11	"Strict Order! The Forbidden Rescue of Orihime Inoue"; Transliteration: "Genmei! Inoue Orihime no Kyushūtsu o Kinzu" (Japanese: 厳命！井上織姫ノ救出ヲ禁ズ)	Masami Shimoda	Hiroaki Nishimura	Natsuko Takahashi	September 26, 2007	August 16, 2009
Tatsuki discovers that Orihime is missing following the attack by the arrancars. Because she had time to heal Ichigo before departing, captain Genryūsai Shigekuni Yamamoto assumes that she is a traitor who left of her own volition, and refuses any attempts to rescue her. Meanwhile, Tatsuki Arisawa questions Ichigo concerning Orihime's disappearance, and Ichigo tells her that it is none of her concern. Ichigo, unwilling to abandon Orihime, turns to Urahara for help, and is joined by Uryū Ishida and Yasutora "Chad" Sado.
143	12	"Grimmjow Revived"; Transliteration: "Fukkatsu no Gurimujō" (Japanese: 復活のグリムジョー)	Takeshi Shirai	Takeshi Shirai	Genki Yoshimura	October 3, 2007	August 23, 2009
After being brought before Aizen, Orihime is asked to demonstrate her power by restoring Grimmjow's arm. After doing so, Grimmjow asks her to restore his tattoo. Following this, he kills Luppi to regain his rank among the Espadas. Although she is worried that her actions will only cause more fighting, Orihime resolves to make herself useful until the Soul Society has prepared for the upcoming war. Meanwhile, Ichigo, Uryū and Chad enter Hueco Mundo with Urahara's aid. In the real world, Isshin Kurosaki meets with Ryūken Ishida in the training chamber underneath the latter's hospital, where they discuss how they raised their respective sons.
144	13	"Ishida and Chad, The Quickening of a New Power"; Transliteration: "Ishida, Chado, Atarashiki Chikara no taidō" (Japanese: 石田・チャド、新しき力の胎動)	Jun'ya Koshiba	Yukio Okazaki	Rika Nakase	October 17, 2007	August 23, 2009
After arriving in Hueco Mundo, Ichigo, Uryū and Chad traverse the halls of an unknown structure. After setting off several traps, they are greeted by Demōra and Iceringer, two arrancar under Aizen's command. Uryū and Chad insist that Ichigo watch them fight, and they overpower the arrancars, showing their new abilities in the process.
145	14	"The Espada Gather! Aizen's Royal Assembly"; Transliteration: "Esupāda Shūketsu! Aizen no Gozen Kaigi" (Japanese: エスパーダ集結！藍染の御前会議)	Masami Anno	Yasuo Iwamoto	Masashi Sogo	October 24, 2007	August 30, 2009
With the two arrancars defeated, the room collapses, forcing Ichigo, Uryū and Chad to escape outside. Upon seeing Las Noches, they begin running towards it, impeded by the various natural hazards of the desert. Meanwhile, Aizen gathers the Espadas to inform them of the intrusion, stressing that the intruders are not to be underestimated, but not to be considered an immediate threat. In the desert, Ichigo, Uryū and Chad encounter three hollows chasing a human child, and decide to help the child.
146	15	"The Name's Nel! The Appearance of a Strange Arrancar"; Transliteration: "Sono Na wa Neru! Fushigi na Arankaru Tōjō" (Japanese: その名はネル！不思議なアランカル登場)	Natsuko Suzuki	Mitsutaka Noshitani	Natsuko Takahashi	October 31, 2007	August 30, 2009
Ichigo learns that the human child is an arrancar named Nelliel Tu Oderschvanck. The three hollows are her brothers Pesche Guatiche and Dondochakka Bilstin, and their pet Bawabawa. Afterwards, a hollow named Lunuganga attacks the group, and they are unable to harm him because his body is made of sand. They are saved by Renji and Rukia, who freezes Lunuganga with her shikai. Nel offers to take the whole group to Las Noches. Before they can reach Las Noches, Lunuganga rises from the sands again.
147	16	"Forest of Menos! Search for the Missing Rukia"; Transliteration: "Menosu no Mori! Kieta Rukia o Sakase" (Japanese: メノスの森！消えたルキアを探せ)	Hodaka Kuramoto Takeshi Shirai	Hodaka Kuramoto	Masashi Sogo	November 7, 2007	September 13, 2009
Lunuganga sinks the group beneath the sands, and Rukia is separated from the group. Nel explains that they are in the Forest of Menos, where most hollows reside. As they begin to fight the hollows around them, Rukia attempts to fight the hollows attacking her. She is rescued by Soul Reaper Ashido Kanō, who attacks her after dispatching all of the hollows. Meanwhile, Nel, Pesche and Dondochakka are kidnapped by a hollow during an attack.
148	17	"Ashido, The Shinigami Who Came from the Past"; Transliteration: "Ashido, Kako kara Kita Shinigami" (Japanese: アシド、過去から来た死神)	Yasuhito Nishikata	Hideo Ikari	Masashi Sogo	November 14, 2007	September 13, 2009
Ashido reveals that his attack was a test of her strength, and he decides to take her back to her friends. Along the way, he relates his past to Rukia, explaining that he was part of a unit which hunts hollows that inadvertently came to Hueco Mundo. They are attacked by an Adjuchas. Meanwhile, Nel and her friends are held captive by the other Adjuchas, and Ichigo, Uryū, Chad and Renji are searching the area for them. Rukia and Ashido easily destroy the first Adjuchas, and another adjuchas prepares up an ambush, in which Ashido is hit while trying to protect Rukia.
149	18	"Through the Crumbling Forest, a Million Menos"; Transliteration: "Kuzureiku Mori, Hyakuman no Menosu" (Japanese: 崩れ行く森、百万のメノス)	Jun'ya Koshiba	Hiroaki Nishimura	Masashi Sogo	November 21, 2007	September 20, 2009
Ashido's mask absorbs the brunt of the attack of the Adjuchas, and Rukia kills the Adjuchas. Meanwhile, Ichigo and the others locate Nel and are led into an ambush. However, they defeat all of the hollows present. Elsewhere, Rukia and Ashido defeat another Adjuchas, and everyone is subsequently reunited. As Ashido attempts to lead them out of the forest, an attack by one of the remaining Adjuchas collapses the passage. Ashido leaves to fight the Adjuchas as the rest of the group returns to the surface. As she leaves, Rukia promises to return for him. In Las Noches, Ulquiorra informs Orihime that her friends have mounted a rescue.
150	19	"Oath! Back Here Alive Again"; Transliteration: "Chikai! Futatabi Ikite Kono Basho e" (Japanese: 誓い！再び生きてこの場所へ)	Masami Shimoda	Kiyomu Fukuda	Genki Yoshimura	November 28, 2007	September 20, 2009
After breaking into Las Noches and finding themselves at a five-way fork, Ichigo's group splits up and each takes one path. When Nel chases after Ichigo, Pesche and Dondochakka forget the direction she took and travel down different paths. Meanwhile, Ulquiorra makes Orihime swear her loyalty to Aizen. Afterwards, he explains to Espada Nnoitra Gilga the psychological traps Aizen created to ensure that Orihime does not have the will to resist. However, Orihime quietly resolves to destroy the Orb of Distortion by erasing its existence, an act that would derail all of Aizen's plans.
151	20	"The Raging Storm! Encounter with the Dancing Arrancar"; Transliteration: "Fukiareru Bōfū! Odoru Arankaru to no Sōgū" (Japanese: 吹き荒れる暴風！踊るアランカルとの遭遇)	Akio Kawamura	Yukio Okazaki	Masahiro Ōkubo	December 5, 2007	September 27, 2009
Ichigo and Nel encounter the Privaron Espada Dordonii Alessandro Del Socacchio, and Ichigo begins to battle him. Uryū and Chad each encounter an arrancar, and former Soul Reaper captains Gin Ichimaru and Kaname Tōsen observe the battles through the surveillance system in Las Noches. Although Ichigo and Dordonii fight evenly, Dordonii gains the upper hand by releasing his zanpakutō.
