= Bleach season 6 =

Season of television series

Bleach
- Season 6
- The cover of the first DVD compilation released by Aniplex of The Arrancar: The Arrival arc, featuring Ulquiorra Schiffer.
- No. of episodes: 22

Release
- Original network: TV Tokyo
- Original release: January 10 – June 27, 2007

Season chronology
- ← Previous; Season 5 Next → Season 7

The sixth season of the Bleach anime series is named the Arrancar: The Arrival arc (破面・出現篇, Arankaru Shutsugen Hen). In the English adaptation of the anime released by Viz Media, the title of the season is translated as The Arrancar. The episodes are directed by Noriyuki Abe, and produced by TV Tokyo, Dentsu, and Studio Pierrot. The season adapts Tite Kubo's Bleach manga series from the rest of the 21st volume to the 26th volume (chapters 183–229), with the exception of episodes 128–131 (filler). The episodes' plot follows the burgeoning war between the Soul Reapers and Arrancars, led by the traitorous former Soul Reaper captain Sousuke Aizen.

The season aired on TV Tokyo from January to June 2007. The English adaptation of the Bleach anime is licensed by Viz Media, and aired on Cartoon Network's Adult Swim in the United States from April to July 2009.

Five DVD compilations, each containing four episodes of the season, were released by Aniplex between June 27 and October 24, 2007. Viz Media released the season in five DVD volumes from April 20 to August 24, 2010. It was also collected in two DVD boxes on September 28 and December 21, 2010, with the latter including the first two episodes of season 7. Manga Entertainment published the season in DVD volumes in the United Kingdom with the first released on April 11 and the second is on June 13, 2011. A DVD box followed it on September 26, 2011.

The episodes use four pieces of theme music: two opening themes and two ending themes. The opening themes are Yui's "Rolling Star", used for the first eleven episodes, and the remainder of the episodes feature "Alones" by Aqua Timez. The ending themes are Mai Hoshimura's "Sakura Biyori" (桜日和; "Cherry Blossom Weather"), used until episode 120, and "Tsumasaki" (爪先; "Tiptoe") by Oreskaband, used in the remainder of the episodes.

== Episodes ==
No. overall	No. in season	Title	Storyboarded by	Directed by	Written by	Original release date	English air date
110	1	"Reopening of the Substitute Business! The Terrifying Transfer Student"; Transliteration: "Daikōgyō Saikai! Kyōfu no Tenkōsei" (Japanese: 代行業再開！恐怖の転校生)	Jun'ya Koshiba	Hiroaki Nishimura	Genki Yoshimura	January 10, 2007	April 19, 2009
In Hueco Mundo, the hollow Grand Fisher transforms into an imperfect arrancar and enters the real world. Meanwhile, Shinji Hirako enrolls at Ichigo Kurosaki's school. During a routine purification of hollows, Ichigo is confronted by Hirako, who shows that he can willingly produce a hollow mask similar to what Ichigo has done unconsciously. He asks Ichigo to join his group, the Vizards. At the same time, Kon, in Ichigo's body, is attacked by Grand Fisher, and Uryū Ishida is attacked by a pair of hollows. Uryū is rescued by his father, Ryūken Ishida, who reveals that he is a Quincy.
111	2	"Shock! The True Identities of the Fathers"; Transliteration: "Kyōgaku! Oyajitachi no Shōtai" (Japanese: 驚愕！親父達の正体)	Motosuke Takahashi	Eitarō Ano	Michiko Yokote	January 17, 2007	April 19, 2009
After rescuing his son from the arrancar attacking him, Ryūken offers Uryū the opportunity to restore his powers on the condition he never associates with Soul Reapers. Kon continues to flee from the Grand Fisher. Despite receiving help from Lirin, Kurōdo and Noba, he is still caught. Isshin Kurosaki, Ichigo's father, arrives to save him. Ichigo and Hirako recognize a new presence, and neither can identify that it is Isshin. Before leaving, Ichigo declines Hirako's invitation. The Grand Fisher draws his zanpakutō, transforming into a stronger state, and Isshin, identifying the Grand Fisher as an arrancar, kills him in a single attack, avenging his wife.
112	3	"The Commencement of War, Vizards and the Arrancars"; Transliteration: "Tatakai no Hajimari, Vaizādo to Arankaru" (Japanese: 戦いの始まり、仮面の軍勢と破面)	Motosuke Takahashi	Jun'ya Koshiba	Masahiro Ōkubo	January 24, 2007	May 3, 2009
Kisuke Urahara appears and converses with Isshin about the arrancar under the command of former Soul Reaper captain Sousuke Aizen, the Vizards, and explains that the Hōgyoku will take a year to be fully awaken. At school, Hirako asks Ichigo again to join the Vizards, explaining that Ichigo's inner hollow will overwhelm him if he does not. Later, Hirako is confronted by Hiyori Sarugaki, another Vizard, who berates him concerning his lack of success in recruiting Ichigo. Orihime Inoue and Yasutora "Chad" Sado confront Hirako and Hiyori, and Hirako takes Hiyori away before she can kill Orihime and Chad. Elsewhere, Uryū agrees to Ryūken's proposal.
113	4	"Prelude to the Apocalypse, The Arrancar's Offensive"; Transliteration: "Sekai Hōkai e no Jokyoku, Arankaru Shūrai" (Japanese: 世界崩壊への序曲、アランカル襲来！)	Masami Shimoda	Akira Shimizu	Masashi Sogo	January 31, 2007	May 3, 2009
After his discussion with Hirako, Ichigo realizes that his inner hollow is indeed becoming more than he can control. At home, the voice of his inner hollow taunts him, saying that he will come closer and closer to him until he takes over his body. Meanwhile, two arrancars, Yammy Riyalgo and Ulquiorra Schiffer arrive in Karakura Town, and Yammy begins to consume the souls of all the humans in the area. Orihime and Chad arrive, and both are easily defeated by Yammy. As he attempts a killing blow against Orihime, Ichigo arrives to block the attack.
114	5	"Reunion, Ichigo and Rukia and Shinigami"; Transliteration: "Saikai, Ichigo to Rukia to Shinigami-tachi" (Japanese: 再会、一護とルキアと死神たち)	Kazunori Mizuno	Kazunori Mizuno (Note: Credited under the pen name "Kumi Hitokuchi" (一口 久美, Hitokuchi Kumi).)	Natsuko Takahashi	February 7, 2007	May 10, 2009
Ichigo uses his bankai, and Ulquiorra identifies him as the target Aizen sent them to investigate. Ichigo begins to battle Yammy, blocking Yammy's first attack and subsequently cutting off his arm. However, his inner hollow interferes, and Yammy gains the advantage. Urahara and Yoruichi Shihōin arrive, and Yammy is easily beaten by both of them. Ulquiorra rescues him from an attack from Urahara, and the two return to Hueco Mundo. At Ichigo's school, Ichigo meets a team of Soul Reapers consisting of Renji Abarai, Tōshirō Hitsugaya, Rangiku Matsumoto, Ikkaku Madarame, Yumichika Ayasegawa and Rukia Kuchiki dispatched to help Ichigo against the arrancar threats.
115	6	"Mission! The Shinigami Have Come"; Transliteration: "Tokumei! Yatte Kita Shinigami-tachi" (Japanese: 特命！やってきた死神たち)	Jun Takada	Hodaka Kuramoto	Masashi Sogo	February 14, 2007	May 10, 2009
After greeting the team, Ichigo is taken by Rukia to fight a hollow. While Ichigo fights the hollow, Rukia berates his inability to defend his friends, and encourages him to fight his inner hollow. Inspired, Ichigo easily defeats the hollow, and Rukia takes him to Orihime to apologize for not protecting her against the arrancar. At Ichigo's house, Hitsugaya explains Aizen's plans for the arrancars and the different types of hollows. In Hueco Mundo, Ulquiorra and Yammy report their findings in the real world to Aizen and an assembly of arrancar.
116	7	"The Evil Eye, Aizen Returns"; Transliteration: "Ashiki Hitomi, Aizen Futatabi" (Japanese: 悪しき瞳、藍染再び)	Natsuko Suzuki	Mitsutaka Noshitani	Genki Yoshimura	February 21, 2007	May 17, 2009
Ulquiorra and Yammy are debriefed by Aizen and the other arrancars. Grimmjow Jaegerjaquez questions Ulquiorra's decision to keep Ichigo alive, and Aizen asserts that he trusts Ulquiorra's judgment, angering Grimmjow. Grimmjow takes a group of five arrancars, Shawlong Qufang, Edorad Leones, Ilfort Grantz, Nakim Greendina and D-Roy Linker, to kill any being with spiritual power in Karakura Town.
117	8	"Rukia's Battle Commences! The Freezing White Blade"; Transliteration: "Rukia Sentō Kaishi! Kōritsuku Shiroi Yaiba" (Japanese: ルキア戦闘開始！凍りつく白い刃)	Tetsuhito Saitō	Hiroaki Nishimura	Masahiro Ōkubo	February 28, 2007	May 17, 2009
Grimmjow's five arrancars separate to attack their targets. D-Roy encounters Chad and nearly kills him before Ichigo intercepts the fatal blow. Rukia arrives, telling Ichigo to allow her to fight D-Roy. Using the shikai of her zanpakutō, she easily defeats D-Roy. However, Grimmjow arrives to fight them, and Rukia realizes that his power is vastly superior to D-Roy's. Meanwhile, Keigo Asano encounters Ikkaku fighting Edorad.
118	9	"Ikkaku's Bankai! The Power That Breaks Everything"; Transliteration: "Ikkaku Bankai! Subete o Kudaku Chikara" (Japanese: 一角卍解！全てを砕く力)	Jun'ya Koshiba	Yūji Sekimoto	Rika Nakase	March 7, 2007	May 24, 2009
Ikkaku fights Edorad, who is forced to release his zanpakutō after failing to counter Ikkaku's unorthodox fighting style. In his released form, Edorad easily overpowers Ikkaku, and Ikkaku uses his bankai. Meanwhile, Grimmjow dispatches Rukia in a single blow, and prepares to fight Ichigo. Ikkaku lands several blows on Edorad, and the two use all their power in a final attack.
119	10	"Zaraki Division's Secret Story! The Lucky Men"; Transliteration: "Zaraki Tai Hiwa! Tsuite iru Otokotachi" (Japanese: 更木隊秘話！ツイている男たち)	Tetsuhito Saitō	Takeshi Shirai	Michiko Yokote	March 21, 2007	May 24, 2009
Ikkaku recalls his first encounter with Kenpachi Zaraki when he was a vagrant in the Rukongai. Kenpachi easily defeated him, and told Ikkaku to consider a respite from death after a fight as luck. After learning that Kenpachi joined the Thirteen Court Guard Squads as a captain, Ikkaku and Yumichika join Kenpachi's division. When Renji was a member of the eleventh division, Ikkaku trained him, and Renji asked Ikkaku to become a captain after discovering that Ikkaku could use his bankai. Ikkaku refused, citing his desire to fight and die under Kenpachi's command. In the present, Ikkaku defeats Edorad, and Yumichika congratulates him on his victory.
120	11	"Hitsugaya Scatters! The Broken Hyōrinmaru"; Transliteration: "Hitsugaya Chiru! Kudaketa Hyōrinmaru" (Japanese: 日番谷散る！砕けた氷輪丸)	Jun Takada	Yukio Okazaki	Genki Yoshimura	March 28, 2007	May 31, 2009
Hitsugaya fights Shawlong, who overpowers him even though he is using his bankai. Renji, also using his bankai, is outmatched against Illfort. Elsewhere, Ichigo begins to fight Grimmjow, who encourages Ichigo to use his bankai. Ilfort and Shawlong release their zanpakutō, and Shawlong explains the ranking structure of the arrancars to Hitsugaya. Afterwards, Rangiku receives confirmation from the Soul Society that they have been granted permission to lift their power limits, and Hitsugaya, Rangiku and Renji do so.
121	12	"Clash! The Protector vs. The Bearer"; Transliteration: "Gekitotsu! Mamoru Mono VS Kōmuru Mono" (Japanese: 激突！護る者VS被る者)	Kazunori Mizuno	Kazunori Mizuno	Masashi Sogo	April 11, 2007	May 31, 2009
With their power limits lifted, Hitsugaya, Rangiku and Renji easily dispatch their opponents. Meanwhile, Ichigo is overpowered by Grimmjow, who is able to fight against Ichigo barehanded. Ichigo uses his Getsuga Tenshō, which slightly damages Grimmjow and awakens his inner hollow. Before Grimmjow can release his zanpakutō, Kaname Tōsen arrives. Tōsen takes Grimmjow back to Hueco Mundo, claiming that he violated Aizen's orders by attacking the real world.
122	13	"Vizard! The Power of the Awakened"; Transliteration: "Vaizādo! Mezameshi Mono-tachi no Chikara" (Japanese: ヴァイザード！目覚めし者たちの力)	Motosuke Takahashi	Jun'ya Koshiba	Natsuko Takahashi	April 18, 2007	June 7, 2009
Grimmjow is taken back to Hueco Mundo by Kaname Tōsen, who asks Aizen for permission to execute Grimmjow. When Aizen denies his request, Tōsen slices off Grimmjow's arm and incinerates it. However, in a later conversation with Gin Ichimaru, it is implied that Aizen had planned for it to happen. In the real world, Ichigo attempts to find the Visoreds, realizing that his inner hollow has become too powerful to control. Meanwhile, Ishida trains with his father under the Karakura Hospital and Chad requests that Urahara train him. Ichigo finds the Vizards, and fights Hirako, believing he can force Hirako to tell him how to control his inner hollow. Hiyori stops the battle, and dons her hollow mask to fight Ichigo.
123	14	"Ichigo, Complete Hollowification!?"; Transliteration: "Ichigo, Kanzen Horō-ka!?" (Japanese: 一護、完全ホロウ化!?)	Tetsuhito Saitō	Mitsutaka Noshitani	Michiko Yokote	April 25, 2007	June 7, 2009
With her hollow mask, Hiyori overpowers Ichigo, who is unwilling to use either his hollow mask or his bankai. Ichigo's inner hollow surfaces, and the other Vizards restrain him before he can harm Hiyori. Hirako gives Ichigo an exercise to assess how much spiritual energy he has. However, after Ichigo proves that he has enough spiritual energy, Hirako explains that he must force his inner hollow into the core of his soul. Hirako renders Ichigo unconscious, and as Ichigo battles his inner hollow in his internal world, his body in the real world begins to transform into a hollow.
124	15	"Collision! Black Bankai and the White Bankai"; Transliteration: "Gekitotsu! Kuroi Bankai to Shiroi Bankai" (Japanese: 激突！黒い卍解と白い卍解)	Manabu Fukazawa	Takeshi Shirai	Masashi Sogo	May 2, 2007	June 14, 2009
Ichigo battles against his inner hollow for control while the Vizards battle his increasingly berserk body. Ichigo and his inner hollow both use their bankai and commence fighting. Meanwhile, Ichigo is continually assaulted by inner manifestations of previous enemies, Byakuya Kuchiki and Jin Kariya. Ichigo's inner hollow overpowers him and breaks his sword, claiming that he has no desire to serve someone with no instinct for battle.
125	16	"Urgent Report! Aizen's Terrifying Plan!"; Transliteration: "Kinkyū Hōkoku! Aizen no Osorubeki Keikaku!" (Japanese: 緊急報告！藍染の恐るべき計画)	Hiroki Takagi	Noriyuki Abe	Masahiro Ōkubo	May 9, 2007	June 14, 2009
After a conversation with a manifestation of Kenpachi Zaraki, Ichigo is able to steal his sword of the hollow and impale him with it, and gains control over his inner hollow. Elsewhere, first division captain Genryūsai Shigekuni Yamamoto speaks with Hitsugaya concerning Aizen's objective, desiring to use 100,000 human souls in Karakura Town to create a key to the dimension the king of the Soul Society lives in and overthrow the king. At Urahara's shop, Chad is training by fighting against Renji's bankai as training, and Uryū is training by fighting his father under Karakura Hospital. Meanwhile, Yamamoto tells Hitsugaya that lieutenant Momo Hinamori wishes to speak with him.
126	17	"Uryū vs. Ryūken! Clash of the Parent-Child Quincys"; Transliteration: "Uryū VS Ryūken! Gekitotsu Kuinshī Oyako" (Japanese: 雨竜VS竜弦！激突クインシー親子)	Hodaka Kuramoto Takeshi Shirai	Hodaka Kuramoto Takeshi Shirai	Natsuko Takahashi	May 16, 2007	June 21, 2009
Hinamori appears to still be in a trance, believing that Aizen is innocent and urges Hitsugaya to save him, which angers him. Throughout the town, various training sessions are taking place: Ichigo is training with Hiyori to lengthen the time he can use his hollow mask, Chad is training with Renji to make his arm stronger, and Uryū is training with Ryūken to regain his powers. Meanwhile, Orihime tracks down Ichigo to inform him of Aizen's plans. This comes as a surprise to the other Vizards, as she passes through the barrier with no effort. In his battle with Ryūken, Uryū finally loses his patience and goes on the attack, only to be shot through the chest. A pentacle-shaped scar forms at the point of contact, and Ryūken informs Uryū that his powers have been restored.
127	18	"Urahara's Decision, Orihime's Thoughts"; Transliteration: "Urahara no Ketsudan, Orihime no Omoi" (Japanese: 浦原の決断、織姫の想い)	Jun'ya Koshiba	Hiroaki Nishimura	Masahiro Ōkubo	May 30, 2007	June 21, 2009
With Orihime's attack spirit Tsubaki destroyed by Yammy, Urahara tells Orihime that he does not want her to participate in the upcoming battle against the arrancar. Orihime is saddened by the decision, but understands it. After being taken back to the Vizards by Hiyori, however, the Vizard Hachigen "Hachi" Ushōda is able to restore Tsubaki. Meanwhile, Yammy has his arm reattached by an arrancar surgeon, and Ulquiorra explains that Grimmjow lost his rank as an Espada when he lost his arm. Yammy is revealed to be the Tenth Espada. Meanwhile Aizen becomes interested in Orihime's powers.
128	19	"The Nightmare Arrancar! Team Hitsugaya Moves Out"; Transliteration: "Akumu no Arankaru! Hitsugayatai Shutsugeki" (Japanese: 悪夢のアランカル！日番谷隊出撃)	Jun'ya Koshiba	Hodaka Kuramoto	Masashi Sogo	June 6, 2007	June 28, 2009
During a hollow attack, Rangiku protects the spirit of a child from an arrancar that sings a strange song. After Ikkaku dispatches the arrancar, they forgo sending the child to the Soul Society to interrogate him. The child, named Shōta Toyokawa, is insisitent that he has something to do before leaving the real world, but will not reveal what it is. Rangiku convinces Hitsugaya to wait a day before sending him to the Soul Society. At night, Shōta attempts to steal Rangiku's zanpakutō, but she catches him. He reveals that he has to find someone, but is evasive about who it is. Before Rangiku can press the issue, the arrancar Ikkaku killed reappears.
129	20	"The Swooping Descent of the Dark Emissary! The Propagation of Malice"; Transliteration: "Maiorita Yami no Shisha! Zōshoku suru Akui" (Japanese: 舞い降りた闇の使者！増殖する悪意)	Motosuke Takahashi	Yukio Okazaki	Masashi Sogo	June 13, 2007	June 28, 2009
While tracking the arrancar, Rangiku and Shōta discover that its song can force souls to walk towards it, and that it can multiply itself without limit. A researcher from the twelfth division reveals that another arrancar is creating the copies, explaining their inability to die. The Soul Reapers defeat all of the arrancars, and Shōta finds the person he was searching for, that being his sister Yui. More clones from the arrancar attack, and Yui runs to the park, where Shōta admits that he abandoned her out of fear.
130	21	"The Invisible Enemy! Hitsugaya's Merciless Decision"; Transliteration: "Mienai Teki! Hitsugaya, Hijō na Ketsudan" (Japanese: 見えない敵！日番谷、非情な決断)	Jun'ya Koshiba	Mitsutaka Noshitani	Masashi Sogo	June 20, 2007	July 5, 2009
The arrancar is revealed to be able to disguise itself as the human souls it has devoured. Upon learning of the attack on Yui by the arrancar, Hitsugaya assumes she is one of the copies, and his inability to send her to the Soul Society confirms this. Still unsure, Hitsugaya has the Soul Society track the disguised arrancar while Yui is sealed within a kido barrier. The analysis confirms Yui is one of the clones, and that the arrancar acquired its cloning ability after absorbing her soul (the report suggests she had strong latent spiritual powers as a human). As Yui's brother, Shōta has similar powers, and Yui uses him to break the barrier.
131	22	"Rangiku's Tears, the Sorrowful Parting of Brother and Sister"; Transliteration: "Rangiku no Namida, Kanashiki Kyōdai no Wakare" (Japanese: 乱菊の涙、哀しき兄妹の別れ)	Makoto Itō	Matsuo Asami	Masashi Sogo	June 27, 2007	July 12, 2009
Although Yui is able to resist the arrancar and keep Shōta safe, the original arrancar devours her. It is overpowered by Hitsugaya and Rangiku, but stalls them by claiming that Yui's trapped soul will be destroyed if they kill him. It creates hundreds of arrancar copies to attack the town while it hides. Hitsugaya uses his bankai in an attempt to find the arrancar by freezing the surroundings. Rangiku and Shōta manage to track the arrancar via the song it sings, and Hitsugaya disables it with his bankai. Rangiku and Shōta defeat the arrancar, releasing all the souls it devoured in the process. With the arrancar gone, Rangiku sends Shōta to the Soul Society to reunite him with his sister.
