= Bleach season 5 =

Season of television series

Bleach
- Season 5
- The cover of the first DVD compilation released by Viz Media of The Bount Assault on Soul Society arc, featuring Ichigo Kurosaki
- No. of episodes: 18

Release
- Original network: TV Tokyo
- Original release: August 8, 2006 – January 4, 2007

Season chronology
- ← Previous; Season 4 Next → Season 6

The fifth season of the Bleach anime series is named the Bount Assault on Soul Society arc (バウント・尸魂界強襲篇, Baunto Sōru Sosaeti Kyōshū Hen). In the English adaptation of the anime released by Viz Media, the title of the season is translated as The Assault. The episodes are directed by Noriyuki Abe, and produced by TV Tokyo, Dentsu, and Studio Pierrot. Like the previous season, it does not adapt from Tite Kubo's manga series of the same name. Instead, it features an original, self-contained filler story arc focusing on the invasion of the Soul Society, the home of the Soul Reapers, by the Bount, a race of vampiric beings that consume human souls to gain power.

The season aired from August 2006 to January 2007, on TV Tokyo. It lasted eighteen episodes. The English adaptation of the season aired on Cartoon Network's Adult Swim in the United States from December 2008 to April 2009. Four DVD compilations of the season were released by Aniplex between January 24 and April 25, 2007. The first two DVD compilations contain four episodes of the season, and the last two contain five episodes. Viz Media released this season in four DVD volumes from December 15, 2009, to March 23, 2010. A DVD box set of the season was released on June 8, 2010. Manga Entertainment released the season in two DVDs for the United Kingdom on August 30 and November 1, 2010, while a box set was released on December 20, 2010.

The episodes use four pieces of theme music: two opening themes and two ending themes. The opening theme for the first six episodes is "Tonight, Tonight, Tonight" by Beat Crusaders; the rest of the episodes use "Rolling Star" by Yui. The ending themes are Takacha's "Movin!!", used for the first six episodes, and "Baby It's You" by June, used for the remainder of the episodes. The opening and ending themes for episodes 106 to 109 use footage from the Bleach feature film, Bleach: Memories of Nobody, to promote the film, which was released on December 16, 2006.

== Episodes ==
No. overall	No. in season	Title	Storyboarded by	Directed by	Written by	Original release date	English air date
92	1	"Invasion of the Shinigami World, Again"; Transliteration: "Shinigami Sekai e no Totsunyū, Futatabi" (Japanese: 死神世界への突入、再び)	Jun'ya Koshiba	Akira Shimizu	Masashi Sogo	August 8, 2006	December 14, 2008
First division captain Genryūsai Shigekuni Yamamoto calls for a meeting of all the Soul Reaper captains to discuss the Bount threat. Captain Tōshirō Hitsugaya is tasked with defeating the Bounts, and Yamamoto gives a standing order to kill all suspected intruders without hesitation. In the Rukongai, the area outside the Soul Reaper fortress of Seireitei, the Bounts Jin Kariya and Gō Koga defeat the Soul Reapers sent to capture them. Meanwhile, Ichigo Kurosaki and his friends enter the Soul Society, and Yoruichi Shihōin explains that Maki Ichinose, a Soul Reaper under Kariya's command, manipulated captain Mayuri Kurotsuchi into opening the gate into the Soul Society.
93	2	"The Bount Assault! The Gotei 13 of Destructive Earthquake"; Transliteration: "Baunto Kyōshū! Gekishin no Gotei Jūsantai" (Japanese: バウント強襲！激震の護廷十三隊)	Tetsuhito Saitō	Hodaka Kuramoto	Rika Nakase	August 15, 2006	December 21, 2008
Ichigo and his friends begin to search different parts of the Rukongaki for the Bounts. While searching, Rukia Kuchiki is attacked by the Bount Yoshi. Caught without her zanpakutō, Rukia is quickly overpowered by Yoshi. Meanwhile, Yamamoto is explaining the origins of the Bounts to the assembled captains, and a messenger informs him that Rukia is fighting a Bount. As Rukia is about to receive a fatal blow from Yoshi, captain Byakuya Kuchiki arrives and attacks her. Following the fight, several buildings in the Seireitei explode.
94	3	"Hitsugaya's Decision! The Clash Approaches"; Transliteration: "Hitsugaya no Ketsui! Gekitotsu no Toki Semaru" (Japanese: 日番谷の決意！激突の時迫る)	Mitsutaka Noshitani	Mitsutaka Noshitani	Michiko Yokote	August 22, 2006	December 28, 2008
Byakuya sends Rukia to the Kuchiki clan's house to recuperate. In the Rukongai, Kariya enters Kusajishi, one of the most crime-ridden parts of Rukongai, and asks the populace to aid him in fighting the Soul Reapers. Ichigo, Uryū Ishida, and Yasutora "Chad" Sado begin searching for the Bounts again, and Ichigo takes the modified soul Lirin with him. Elsewhere in a forest in the Rukongai, Byakuya encounters Kariya.
95	4	"Byakuya Takes the Field! Dance of the Wind-Splitting Cherry Blossoms"; Transliteration: "Byakuya Shutsujin! Kaze o Saku Sakura no Mai" (Japanese: 白哉出陣！風を裂く桜の舞)	Jun Takada	Takeshi Shirai	Masashi Sogo	September 5, 2006	January 4, 2009
Byakuya and Kariya begin their battle, and Kariya reveals his doll Messer, which gives him the ability to control wind. Byakuya uses his shikai, but Kariya uses a barrier of wind to deflect his attack. Ichigo arrives to assist Byakuya, and after using his bankai, begins to fight Kariya. With Kariya focused on fighting Ichigo, Byakuya uses his bankai, and manages to penetrate Kariya's wind barrier. However, Kariya heals himself, revealing that in the Soul Society, the Bounts can consume the spirit particles in the air to restore their bodies. In Kusajishi, Koga and Ichinose convince the inhabitants to join them in their revolt in order to create a "new Soul Society".
96	5	"Ichigo, Byakuya, Kariya, The Battle of the Three Extremes!"; Transliteration: "Ichigo, Byakuya, Kariya, Sankyoku no Tatakai!" (Japanese: 一護・白哉・狩矢、三極の戦い！)	Tetsuhito Saitō	Eitarō Ano	Masashi Sogo	September 12, 2006	January 11, 2009
Byakuya and Ichigo continue to fight Kariya, who continually regenerates all damage by absorbing spirit particles. However, Byakuya and Ichigo begin to inflict larger injuries on Kariya, not giving him time to recover. Rantao, the Soul Reaper who created the Bounts, arrives and Kariya retreats. As Byakuya leaves, Uryū arrives, and Rantao takes Ichigo and Uryū to her home.
97	6	"Hitsugaya Strikes! Slice the Enemy in the Middle of the Forest"; Transliteration: "Hitsugaya Shutsugeki! Mori no Naka no Teki o Kire!" (Japanese: 日番谷出撃！森の中の敵を斬れ)	Kazunori Mizuno	Kazunori Mizuno (Note: Credited under the pen name "Kumi Hitokuchi" (一口 久美, Hitokuchi Kumi).)	Masashi Sogo	September 19, 2006	January 18, 2009
When Uryū notes that Rantao is identical to the Bount Yoshino Sōma, Rantao reveals that Yoshino's soul was a copy of hers, and that the Bounts were the byproducts of an experiment in which the research team she led tried to create immortal souls. In a forest in the Rukongai, Hitsugaya confronts Ichinose, and begins to fight him as Renji Abarai, Rangiku Matsumoto, Ichigo, and Chad arrive. In Kusajishi, Kariya prepares to invade the Seireitei.
98	7	"Clash! Kenpachi Zaraki vs. Maki Ichinose"; Transliteration: "Gekitotsu! Zaraki Kenpachi VS Ichinose Maki" (Japanese: 激突！更木剣八VS一之瀬真樹)	Norihiro Sunagawa	Hodaka Kuramoto	Masahiro Ōkubo	October 4, 2006	January 25, 2009
Hitsugaya and Ichinose continue their battle, and Ichinose uses his shikai, blinding all of those present. As Ichinose is about to attack Chad, his attack is blocked by eleventh division captain Kenpachi Zaraki. Kenpachi instructs Hitsugaya to take the group and stop Kariya from invading Sereitei, and Ichinose, torn between his loyalty to Kariya and desire to avenge his former captain by killing Kenpachi, decides to stay and fight Kenpachi. Kenpachi easily blocks all of Ichinose's attacks, forcing him to use his zanpakutō to trap him in a sphere of light. Kenpachi removes his eyepatch and releases his full power to destroy the sphere. Refusing to surrender, Ichinose attacks Kenpachi a final time, and Kenpachi slices him across the chest, leaving him for dead.
99	8	"Shinigami vs. Shinigami! The Uncontrollable Power"; Transliteration: "Shinigami VS shinigami! Bōsō suru Chikara" (Japanese: 死神VS死神！暴走する力)	Jun'ya Koshiba	Akira Shimizu	Masashi Sogo	October 11, 2006	February 1, 2009
With the aid of the Kusajishi inhabitants, Kariya and the other Bounts enter Sereitei. As they enter, Kariya kills the Kusajishi inhabitants, claiming that their usefulness has ended. Kariya dispatches the Bounts to eliminate the Soul Reaper captains, and heads farther into Sereitei. Second division captain Suì-Fēng orders her men to attack the Bounts, but the Bount Mabashi uses his doll Ritz to take control of them. When Suì-Fēng asks for a status report, one of her men controlled by Ritz attacks her with a bitto.
100	9	"Suì-Fēng Dies? The Last of the Special Forces"; Transliteration: "Soifon Shisu? Onmitsukidō no Saigo" (Japanese: 砕蜂死す？隠密機動の最後)	Motosuke Takahashi	Jun'ya Koshiba	Masashi Sogo	October 18, 2006	February 8, 2009
The bitto incapacitates Suì-Fēng with a poison, and Ritz uses the controlled Soul Reapers to cause chaos throughout Sereitei by turning them against other Soul Reapers, including seventh division captain Sajin Komamura and ninth division lieutenant Shūhei Hisagi, who manage to knock many of the infected Soul Reapers unconscious. Meanwhile, Suì-Fēng attempts to fight Mabashi, and hits him once with her shikai, leaving a mark on his chest. She collapses from the poison, and Mabashi attempts to use Ritz to control her. Suì-Fēng then quickly strikes Mabashi in the chest to deal a fatal blow, revealing that her zanpakutō allows her to counteract poisons. Elsewhere, Mayuri confronts the Bount Sawatari.
101	10	"Mayuri's Bankai!! Sawatari: Clash of the Demon"; Transliteration: "Mayuri Bankai!! Sawatari: Akuma no Gekitotsu" (Japanese: マユリ卍解!!沢渡・悪魔の激突)	Kensuke Aiba	Mitsutaka Noshitani	Masahiro Ōkubo	November 1, 2006	February 15, 2009
Sawatari attacks Mayuri with his doll Baura, and manages to rip Mayuri's left arm off. Mayuri regenerates his arm with his medicine, and uses his zanpakutō to paralyze Baura. Mayuri then stabs Sawatari in the right arm, and Baura manages to overcome the paralysis to retreat with Sawatari into another dimension. Sawatari surfaces in another location in Sereitei, and Mayuri appears, revealing that he made a scanner to track the Bount. Sawatari attacks Mayuri with the power of other Soul Reapers that Baura absorbed in previous battles. Mayuri is forced to use his bankai, and kills Sawatari. Elsewhere, Uryū begins to fight the Bount Yoshi.
102	11	"The Last Quincy! The Exploding Power"; Transliteration: "Saigo no Kuinshī! Bōhatsu suru Chikara" (Japanese: 最後のクインシー！暴発する力)	Tetsuhito Saitō	Takeshi Shirai	Masashi Sogo	November 8, 2006	February 22, 2009
Uryū and Yoshi begin their battle, and Uryū realizes that the Quincy battle accessory he is using does not allow him to properly focus his power. When Uryū is able to properly use the accessory and fire a powerful arrow, Yoshi is able to block it by changing the form of her doll Nieder into a fan. She then transforms her doll into a jian and knocks Uryū to the ground. Meanwhile, Kariya breaks into the Department of Research and Development, searching for a Bount crest called the Jōkaishō. Despite the efforts of Chad and Ichigo, Kariya finds the Jōkaishō, and after fusing with it, claims he has enough power to destroy Sereitei.
103	12	"Ishida, Exceeding the Limits to Attack!"; Transliteration: "Ishida, Genkai o Koete Ute!" (Japanese: 石田、限界を超えて撃て！)	Jun Takada	Hiroaki Nishimura	Masashi Sogo	November 15, 2006	March 1, 2009
Uryū and Yoshi continue their battle, and Uryū is able to defeat Yoshi by capitalizing on Yoshi's weakness of not being able to defend and attack at the same time. Meanwhile, Kariya is confronted by Koga, who claims that Kariya is insane for desiring to destroy Sereitei. Kariya injures Koga and leaves. As Koga tries to follow Kariya, he is attacked by several Soul Reapers, and defeats them, which alerts Hitsugaya to Koga's presence.
104	13	"10th Division's Death Struggle! The Release of Hyōrinmaru"; Transliteration: "Shitō Jūbantai! Hyōrinmaru o Hanate" (Japanese: 死闘十番隊！氷輪丸を放て)	Jun'ya Koshiba	Eitarō Ano	Masashi Sogo	November 22, 2006	March 8, 2009
After defeating several Soul Reapers of the tenth division, Koga meets Hitsugaya. Koga summons his doll Dalk, who is quickly frozen and shattered by the shikai of Hitsugaya's zanpakutō. Koga fuses the remains of Dalk into an axe, and Hitsugaya uses his bankai in response. Hitsugaya injures Koga repeatedly, forcing him to absorb spirit particles to heal himself, but his body begins to reject the spirit particles. Koga makes a final attack on Hitsugaya, who slashes him, and Koga alludes to "a future without war" before collapsing.
105	14	"Kariya! Countdown to the Detonation"; Transliteration: "Kariya! Bakuhatsu e no Kauntodaun" (Japanese: 狩矢！爆発へのカウントダウン)	Kazunori Mizuno	Kazunori Mizuno	Masahiro Ōkubo	November 29, 2006	March 15, 2009
Hitsugaya orders his subordinates to give Koga a proper burial, and eighth division lieutenant Nanao Ise informs Yamamoto of the Jōkaishō. The following day, Rantao confronts Kariya, and after seeing the Jōkaishō, recalls how she hid the Bounts in a cave following their creation. After the Soul Society ordered that the Bounts be destroyed, she saved a Bount child, who she realizes is Kariya. Uryū realizes that Rantao is fighting Kariya, and heads towards her location as Rantao is hit by one of Kariya's attacks.
106	15	"Life and Revenge! Ishida, the Ultimate Choice"; Transliteration: "Inochi to Fukushū! Ishida, Kyūkyoku no Sentaku" (Japanese: 命と復讐！石田、究極の選択)	Tetsuhito Saitō	Akira Shimizu	Masashi Sogo	December 6, 2006	March 22, 2009
Kariya recalls the events after the Soul Reapers' attack on the Bounts. After escaping from the Soul Reapers, he fused with his doll when attacked by a hollow. Desiring to travel to the Soul Society to make peace with their creators, the Bounts attempted to use the Quincy to enter the Soul Society, and were defeated. Kariya organized the remaining Bounts in order to take revenge on the Soul Society. In the present, Uryū arrives and fights Kariya. Rantao uses the Jōkaishō's power to stun Kariya, and asks Uryū to kill Kariya. However, Rantao begins to feel pain from the Jōkaishō, and Uryū uses his remaining power to save her, which destroys his Quincy battle accessory. As Kariya is about to kill Uryū and Rantao, Ichigo arrives.
107	16	"The Swung-Down Edge! The Moment of Ruin"; Transliteration: "Furiorosareta Yaiba! Hametsu no Shunkan" (Japanese: 振り下ろされた刃！破滅の瞬間)	Jun Takada	Hodaka Kuramoto	Masashi Sogo	December 13, 2006	March 29, 2009
Ichigo uses his bankai and begins to fight Kariya. Rantao reveals that there are multiple Jōkaishō scattered throughout the Soul Society that will detonate when Kariya uses his Jōkaishō, and the Soul Reapers of the Thirteen Court Guard Squads begin to seal all of the Jōkaishō. Meanwhile, Ichinose arrives and attacks Ichigo, but turns his sword on Kariya, claiming that he did not join Kariya to watch him destroy the Soul Society. Kariya kills Ichinose, and reveals Messer in the form of a sword of wind.
108	17	"The Wailing Bount! The Last Clash"; Transliteration: "Dōkoku no Baunto! Saigo no Gekitotsu" (Japanese: 慟哭のバウント！最後の激突)	Manabu Fukazawa	Takeshi Shirai	Masashi Sogo	December 20, 2006	April 5, 2009
Kariya uses the wind Messer to produce electricity, and attacks Ichigo with it. Ichigo's inner hollow momentarily takes over his body, but Ichigo regains control of his body, surprising Kariya. Ichigo informs Kariya that he cannot absorb spirit particles to heal himself because Rantao sealed his absorption ability. Ichigo and Kariya engage in a final clash where Kariya is killed. Ichigo concludes that Kariya intended to travel to the Soul Society in order to end his eternal life.
109	18	"Ichigo and Rukia, Thoughts in the Revolving Around Heaven"; Transliteration: "Ichigo to Rukia, Kaiten suru Omoi" (Japanese: 一護とルキア、廻天する想い)	Kensuke Aiba	Mitsutaka Noshitani	Masashi Sogo	January 4, 2007	April 12, 2009
Ichigo, Renji and Rukia return to the Kuchiki house to discuss Kariya's life. Ichigo remarks on how his life was changed when Rukia gave him her powers, Renji recalls when he was promoted to lieutenant of the sixth division, and Rukia reminisces on the day when she was assigned to the real world. Afterwards, Ichigo and his friends return to the real world. Yoruichi brings Koga, who survived his fight with Hitsugaya, to Rantao's hideout. Hidden from the Soul Reapers, he is able to recover from his injuries. Koga accepts that the destiny of the Bounts is to eventually die out. On the last scene, Ichigo and friends are seen heading to the real world, then a mysterious person is seen entering Karakura Town.
