= List of Bleach volumes =

Cover of the first tankōbon for Bleach, released in Japan by Shueisha on January 5, 2002

Bleach is a Japanese manga series written and illustrated by Tite Kubo. The plot starts with Ichigo Kurosaki, a teenager who accidentally steals the powers of the Soul Reaper Rukia Kuchiki and subsequently assumes her duties while she convalesces. Since that event, Ichigo has to fight Hollows, evil spirits of past humans that feed on unwary people.

The manga was first published in Shueisha's Weekly Shōnen Jump from August 7, 2001, to August 22, 2016. The 698 individual chapters (Note: Comprising 686 listed chapters and 12 chapters which were listed as -108 to -97.) were collected by Shueisha in a series of 74 tankōbon volumes between January 5, 2002, and November 4, 2016. Most chapter names are written in English and have katakana above them to indicate how they are read in Japanese, similar to the usage of furigana ruby characters with advanced kanji characters. The total count of published Bleach chapters and the number on the highest-numbered chapter do not match. This is because, in addition to the positive numbered chapters, some chapters are published with a negative or fractional chapter number. These "negative" chapters are side stories that involve events that precede the main plot of the series.

North American licensee Viz Media serialized the individual chapters in Shonen Jump from its November 2007 to April 2012 issues. The series moved to the digital anthology Weekly Shonen Jump Alpha in January 2012 and Viz Media published it digitally as Shueisha released new chapters in Japan. The first volume on English was released on July 6, 2004, and the last volume–the 74th–was released on October 2, 2018. The company released a hardcover "collector's edition" of the first volume with a dust jacket on August 5, 2008, followed by a box set on September 2, 2008, containing the first 21 volumes, a poster, and a booklet about the series. A second box set was released on July 7, 2015, containing volumes 22–48, the Bleach pilot and a poster. A re-release of the series under the label of "3-in-1 Edition" started on June 7, 2011; as of March 5, 2019, all twenty five volumes have been released.

Viz Media released digital forms of the first 16 volumes in English on June 17, 2011. As of October 2, 2018, all 74 digital volumes have been published. On September 21, 2012, Shueisha released 45 digital volumes in Japanese e-book stores. As of November 4, 2016, all 74 digital volumes have been released.

== Volumes ==
=== Volumes 1–21 ===
No.	Title	Original release date	English release date
1	Strawberry and the Soul Reapers (Note: When released by Viz Media, the original title "The Death and the Strawberry" was replaced with "Strawberry and the Soul Reapers".); The Death and the Strawberry	January 5, 2002; 978-4-08-873213-8	July 6, 2004; 978-1-59116-441-8
2	Goodbye Parakeet, Good Night My Sister	March 4, 2002; 978-4-08-873237-4	August 3, 2004; 978-1-59116-442-5
3	memories in the rain	June 4, 2002; 978-4-08-873275-6	October 12, 2004; 978-1-59116-443-2
4	Quincy Archer Hates You	September 4, 2002; 978-4-08-873310-4	December 7, 2004; 978-1-59116-444-9
5	Right Arm of the Giant	November 1, 2002; 978-4-08-873335-7	February 1, 2005; 978-1-59116-445-6
6	The Death Trilogy Overture	December 20, 2002; 978-4-08-873366-1	April 5, 2005; 978-1-59116-728-0
7	The Broken Coda	March 4, 2003; 978-4-08-873392-0	May 31, 2005; 978-1-59116-807-2
8	The Blade and Me	June 4, 2003; 978-4-08-873435-4	August 2, 2005; 978-1-59116-872-0
9	Fourteen Days for Conspiracy	August 4, 2003; 978-4-08-873495-8	October 10, 2005; 978-1-59116-924-6
10	Tattoo on the Sky	November 4, 2003; 978-4-08-873525-2	December 6, 2005; 978-1-4215-0081-2
11	A Star and a Stray Dog	December 19, 2003; 978-4-08-873555-9	February 7, 2006; 978-1-4215-0271-7
12	Flower on the Precipice	March 4, 2004; 978-4-08-873576-4	April 4, 2006; 978-1-4215-0403-2
13	The Undead	June 4, 2004; 978-4-08-873610-5	June 6, 2006; 978-1-4215-0611-1
14	White Tower Rocks	September 3, 2004; 978-4-08-873649-5	August 1, 2006; 978-1-4215-0612-8
15	Beginning of the Death of Tomorrow	December 3, 2004; 978-4-08-873682-2	October 3, 2006; 978-1-4215-0613-5
16	Night of Wijnruit	March 4, 2005; 978-4-08-873777-5	December 5, 2006; 978-1-4215-0614-2
17	Rosa Rubicundior, Lilio Candidior	June 3, 2005; 978-4-08-873817-8	February 6, 2007; 978-1-4215-1041-5
18	The Deathberry Returns	August 4, 2005; 978-4-08-873841-3	April 3, 2007; 978-1-4215-1042-2
19	The Black Moon Rising	October 4, 2005; 978-4-08-873862-8	June 5, 2007; 978-1-4215-1043-9
20	End of Hypnosis	December 2, 2005; 978-4-08-873883-3	August 7, 2007; 978-1-4215-1044-6
21	Be My Family or Not	March 3, 2006; 978-4-08-874027-0	October 2, 2007; 978-1-4215-1165-8

=== Volumes 22–48 ===
No.	Title	Original release date	English release date
22	Conquistadores	May 2, 2006; 978-4-08-874049-2	February 5, 2008; 978-1-4215-1179-5
23	¡Mala Suerte!	August 4, 2006; 978-4-08-874140-6	June 3, 2008; 978-1-4215-1541-0
24	Immanent God Blues	October 4, 2006; 978-4-08-874262-5	September 2, 2008; 978-1-4215-1603-5
25	No Shaking Throne	December 4, 2006; 978-4-08-874289-2	December 2, 2008; 978-1-4215-1796-4
26	The Mascaron Drive	February 2, 2007; 978-4-08-874315-8	March 3, 2009; 978-1-4215-2384-2
27	Goodbye, Halcyon Days	April 4, 2007; 978-4-08-874339-4	June 2, 2009; 978-1-4215-2385-9
28	Baron's Lecture Full-Course	June 4, 2007; 978-4-08-874365-3	September 1, 2009; 978-1-4215-2386-6
29	The Slashing Opera	August 3, 2007; 978-4-08-874398-1	December 1, 2009; 978-1-4215-2387-3
30	There Is No Heart Without You	October 4, 2007; 978-4-08-874423-0	March 2, 2010; 978-1-4215-2388-0
31	Don't Kill My Volupture	December 4, 2007; 978-4-08-874444-5	June 1, 2010; 978-1-4215-2809-0
32	Howling	February 4, 2008; 978-4-08-874473-5	September 7, 2010; 978-1-4215-2810-6
33	The Bad Joke	April 4, 2008; 978-4-08-874494-0	December 7, 2010; 978-1-4215-2811-3
34	King of The Kill	July 4, 2008; 978-4-08-874541-1	March 1, 2011; 978-1-4215-2812-0
35	Higher Than The Moon	October 3, 2008; 978-4-08-874575-6	June 7, 2011; 978-1-4215-3312-4
36	Turn Back The Pendulum	December 4, 2008; 978-4-08-874603-6	September 6, 2011; 978-1-4215-3313-1
37	Beauty Is So Solitary	February 4, 2009; 978-4-08-874628-9	December 6, 2011; 978-1-4215-3314-8
38	Fear for Fight	April 3, 2009; 978-4-08-874649-4	February 7, 2012; 978-1-4215-3597-5
39	El Verdugo	June 4, 2009; 978-4-08-874674-6	April 3, 2012; 978-1-4215-3598-2
40	The Lust	August 4, 2009; 978-4-08-874712-5	June 5, 2012; 978-1-4215-4137-2
41	Heart	October 2, 2009; 978-4-08-874734-7	June 5, 2012; 978-1-4215-4138-9
42	Shock of the Queen	December 4, 2009; 978-4-08-874762-0	July 3, 2012; 978-1-4215-4139-6
43	Kingdom of Hollows	February 4, 2010; 978-4-08-874794-1	July 3, 2012; 978-1-4215-4296-6
44	Vice It	April 2, 2010; 978-4-08-870020-5	August 7, 2012; 978-1-4215-4297-3
45	The Burnout Inferno	June 4, 2010; 978-4-08-870046-5	August 7, 2012; 978-1-4215-4298-0
46	Back From Blind	August 4, 2010; 978-4-08-870085-4	September 4, 2012; 978-1-4215-4299-7
47	End of the Chrysalis Age	October 4, 2010; 978-4-08-870110-3	September 4, 2012; 978-1-4215-4300-0
48	God Is Dead	December 3, 2010; 978-4-08-870144-8	October 2, 2012; 978-1-4215-4301-7

=== Volumes 49–74 ===
No.	Title	Original release date	English release date
49	The Lost Agent	April 21, 2011; 978-4-08-870186-8	October 18, 2012; 978-1-4215-4302-4
50	The Six Fullbringers	June 3, 2011; 978-4-08-870219-3	November 6, 2012; 978-1-4215-4303-1
51	Love Me Bitterly Loth Me Sweetly	August 4, 2011; 978-4-08-870272-8	November 18, 2012; 978-1-4215-4304-8
52	End of Bond	October 4, 2011; 978-4-08-870291-9	December 4, 2012; 978-1-4215-4305-5
53	The Deathberry Returns 2	December 2, 2011; 978-4-08-870291-9	December 26, 2012; 978-1-4215-4949-1
54	Goodbye to Our Xcution	March 2, 2012; 978-4-08-870386-2	January 1, 2013; 978-1-4215-5138-8
55	The Blood Warfare	June 4, 2012; 978-4-08-870418-0	February 5, 2013; 978-1-4215-5236-1
56	March of the StarCross	September 4, 2012; 978-4-08-870478-4	April 2, 2013; 978-1-4215-5476-1
57	Out of Bloom	December 4, 2012; 978-4-08-870516-3	July 2, 2013; 978-1-4215-5882-0
58	The Fire	March 4, 2013; 978-4-08-870551-4	October 1, 2013; 978-1-4215-6135-6
59	The Battle	June 4, 2013; 978-4-08-870662-7	February 4, 2014; 978-1-4215-6237-7
60	Everything But The Rain	August 2, 2013; 978-4-08-870782-2	April 1, 2014; 978-1-4215-6458-6
61	The Last 9 Days	December 4, 2013; 978-4-08-870818-8	August 5, 2014; 978-1-4215-7383-0
62	Heart Of Wolf	March 4, 2014; 978-4-08-870850-8	November 4, 2014; 978-1-4215-7681-7
63	Hear, Fear, Here	May 2, 2014; 978-4-08-880055-4	February 3, 2015; 978-1-4215-7855-2
64	Death in Vision	September 4, 2014; 978-4-08-880134-6	July 7, 2015; 978-1-4215-7973-3
65	Marching Out the Zombies	October 3, 2014; 978-4-08-880191-9	November 3, 2015; 978-1-4215-8084-5
66	Sorry I Am Strong	January 5, 2015; 978-4-08-880191-9	March 1, 2016; 978-1-4215-8262-7
67	Black	April 3, 2015; 978-4-08-880327-2	July 5, 2016; 978-1-4215-8506-2
68	The Ordinary Peace	July 3, 2015; 978-4-08-880423-1	November 1, 2016; 978-1-4215-8583-3
69	Against the Judgement	August 4, 2015; 978-4-08-880460-6	March 7, 2017; 978-1-4215-8701-1
70	Friend	November 4, 2015; 978-4-08-880497-2	July 4, 2017; 978-1-4215-8867-4
71	Baby, Hold Your Hand	March 4, 2016; 978-4-08-880604-4	November 7, 2017; 978-1-4215-9095-0
72	My Last Words	May 2, 2016; 978-4-08-880649-5	March 6, 2018; 978-1-4215-9166-7
73	Battle Field Burning	July 4, 2016; 978-4-08-880684-6	July 3, 2018; 978-1-4215-9434-7
74	The Death and the Strawberry	November 4, 2016; 978-4-08-880774-4	October 2, 2018; 978-1-4215-9602-0

=== 3-in-1 Edition ===
Volume	Chapters	English release date	ISBN	Ref.
Volume 1	1–25	June 7, 2011	978-1-4215-3992-8	
Volume 2	26–52	August 2, 2011	978-1-4215-3993-5	
Volume 3	53–79	October 4, 2011	978-1-4215-3994-2	
Volume 4	80–107; Extra	February 5, 2013	978-1-4215-5467-9	
Volume 5	108–130; Extra	May 7, 2013	978-1-4215-5468-6	
Volume 6	131–158	September 3, 2013	978-1-4215-5469-3	
Volume 7	159–187; Extra	January 7, 2014	978-1-4215-5911-7	
Volume 8	188–214; Extra	May 6, 2014	978-1-4215-6459-3	
Volume 9	215–242	September 2, 2014	978-1-4215-6465-4	
Volume 10	243–269	January 6, 2015	978-1-4215-6466-1	
Volume 11	270–295	May 5, 2015	978-1-4215-7687-9	
Volume 12	296–(-100)	August 5, 2015	978-1-4215-7865-1	
Volume 13	(-99)–340	November 5, 2015	978-1-4215-8210-8	
Volume 14	341–367	February 2, 2016	978-1-4215-8531-4	
Volume 15	368–395	May 3, 2016	978-1-4215-8532-1	
Volume 16	396–423	August 2, 2016	978-1-4215-8533-8	
Volume 17	424-450	November 1, 2016	978-1-4215-8581-9	
Volume 18	451-479	February 7, 2017	978-1-4215-8582-6	
Volume 19	480-509	May 2, 2017	978-1-4215-9096-7	
Volume 20	510–540	August 1, 2017	978-1-4215-9097-4	
Volume 21	541–570	November 7, 2017	978-1-4215-9603-7	
Volume 22	571–601	February 6, 2018	978-1-4215-9604-4	
Volume 23	602–632	May 1, 2018	978-1-4215-9605-1	
Volume 24	633–663	October 2, 2018	978-1-4215-9606-8	
Volume 25	664–686	March 5, 2019	978-1-4215-9870-3	
