= Sousuke Aizen =

Fictional character from Bleach

- Bleach character
- Aizen on the cover of Volume 12.
- First appearance: Bleach chapter 79: "FOURTEEN DAYS FOR CONSPIRACY" (2003)
- Created by: Tite Kubo
- Voiced by: Japanese; Shō Hayami; English; Kyle Hebert

In-universe information
- Species: Soul Reaper
- Family: Mizuki Aizen

Sousuke Aizen (Japanese: 藍(あい)染(ぜん) 惣(そ)右(う)介(すけ), Hepburn: Aizen Sousuke) (Note: Aizen's given name Sosuke is also popularly romanized as Sōsuke with a macron letter ō, or Sôsuke with a circumflex as in the manga's official Viz Media translation; this vowel contraction is erroneous given that So-u is separated by a clear morpheme boundary between two kanji: 惣 (そ, So) and 右 (う, u).) is a fictional character in the Japanese manga and anime series Bleach created by Tite Kubo. He is the main antagonist of the first part of the story of Bleach. Serving as captain of the Fifth Division of Soul Reapers when he is introduced, Aizen later fakes his death and horribly betrays the Soul Society in search of immense power to overthrow and defeat the Soul King, before Ichigo Kurosaki and Kisuke Urahara defeat him in the newest iteration. His former lieutenant is Momo Hinamori.

== Character outline ==
=== Background ===
Aizen spent his life working in the Fifth Division, eventually becoming its lieutenant under the former captain, Shinji Hirako. Aizen gained followers, including Gin Ichimaru and Kaname Tōsen. A century before the series' setting, after Kisuke Urahara created the Hōgyoku, an item he believed creates Soul Reaper and Hollow hybrids, Aizen began to experiment using the Soul Reapers that would become the Vizards. Among his test subjects was Shinji, who knew about Aizen, but learned too late that Aizen used his mistrust against him. Having also framed Kisuke for the Vizards' creation and forced his exile, Aizen learned the Hōgyoku actually grants its user's desires if they have the will to carry it out. But as Kisuke took the Hōgyoku with him, Aizen bides his time to take the item when the time comes.

At some point, Aizen saw the potential of Shuhei Hisagi, Momo Hinamori, Izuru Kira and Renji Abarai, and Aizen took the latter three into his division. Aizen continued experimenting on Soul Reaper/Hollow hybrids with his creations Metastacia and White, playing a respective role between Rukia Kuchiki and those of Isshin Shiba and Masaki Kurosaki. After leaving the Soul Society, Aizen, Ichimaru and Tosen travelled to Hueco Mundo and arranged an alliance with the self-proclaimed god king of Hueco Mundo, Barragan Luisenbarn. As Barragan refused, Aizen revealed all of the Hollow minions were killed during the discussion and forces Barragan into servitude. From there, Aizen appropriates Barragan's palace Las Noches and reconstructs it in his own image, recruiting Tier Halibel and other Arrancars that would become his Espadas.

=== Powers and Abilities ===
Aizen wielding Kyoka Suigetsu while evolving as a result of using the Hōgyoku as seen on the cover for Volume 48.

Aizen is an extremely powerful and intelligent combatant, well above many captain-level Soul Reapers, which is the highest-ranking position just under the head captain. When preparing to activate the Hōgyoku, he states that despite its half-awakened state, it can be fully activated temporarily when fusing with someone with at least twice as much spirit pressure as an average captain-level Soul Reaper, referring to himself. After Aizen embedded the Hōgyoku into his body, he undergoes a series of transformations that give him extraordinary boosts in his strength and power. There are very few that can battle him and survive.

Originally, Aizen carried a zanpakutō called Kyōka Suigetsu (鏡花水月; literally "flower in the mirror, moon on the water"). Kyōka Suigetsu's Shikai ability Kanzen Saimin (完全催眠; literally "Complete Hypnosis"), activated with the command "shatter" (砕けろ, kudakero), is effective if the target watches the Shikai sequence once and thus can fall under Aizen's deception any time he wishes. There are only a few means to escape the sword's influence such as touching the blade before it is activated as Gin overheard. Though unaware of that fact, in his gambit to take down Aizen, Yamamoto grabbed the blade when it pierced him and read the blade's force to distinguish Aizen. After his final evolution by the Hōgyoku, he was made immortal. It was only thanks to Ichigo's Mugetsu technique that Aizen was able to be sealed. Afterwards, Aizen finds that he no longer needs Kyōka Suigetsu itself as the weapon completely dissolves with its powers now a part of his being.

== Appearances ==
=== Manga and anime ===
Setting up the events from the shadows, Aizen arranged for Rukia Kuchiki to meet with Ichigo Kurosaki so he can become a Soul Reaper. From there, by sending Hollows in Karakura Town to alert the Soul Society for the location to get the Hōgyoku that is concealed within her body, Aizen created an elaborate conspiracy among the Thirteen Court Squad captains by secretly killing the members of Central 46 Chambers and using his Zanpakutō to create an illusion of them and sentence Rukia to death. Gin fakes Aizen's death to have the captains and lieutenants fighting against themselves. However, Squad 4 Captain Retsu Unohana uncovered the truth, as Aizen removed the Hōgyoku from Rukia, before he, Gin and Tōsen escape into Hueco Mundo. There, Aizen prepares his goal: Using the Hōgyoku to sacrifice the souls of Karakura Town in order to create an Ōken (王鍵) and kill the Soul King.

From there, Aizen begins to make several Arrancars in his service stronger using the Hōgyoku and sends some of his Espadas to the Land of the Living to gain information on Ichigo. Eventually, claiming to have an interest in her power, Aizen has Orihime Inoue brought to Las Noches on the notion that he needs her to save the powers of the deteriorating Hōgyoku. However, sacrificing the weakest members of the Espadas in the process, Aizen revealed the kidnapping as a distraction for Ichigo and as part of a scheme to cut the Soul Society's forces in half by the time he enacts his attack on Karakura Town. Though he came with three of his strongest Espadas, the defeat of Staark and Baraggan convinces Aizen that he has surpassed his own minions and strikes Halibel down to deal with the opposition personally. When confronted by Ichigo, who is the only person not affected by his Zanpakutō, Aizen reveals his role in the youth's life and struggles since meeting Rukia. Aizen then almost reveals Ichigo's lineage when Isshin intervened to take over the fight. Aizen reveals that he absorbed the Hōgyoku as it grants his desire for a Hollow-like form to easily defeat his enemies.

Aizen makes his way to the Soul Society so that he can create the Ōken, finding Ichigo's school friends and deciding to kill them first before enacting his goal. Aizen is wounded by Gin, who reveals he tricked Aizen by pretending to be his right-hand man until the time was ideal to betray him. However, his will to survive answered by the Hōgyoku, Aizen evolves into another form and mortally wounds Gin as Ichigo arrives. Though expecting him not to be a threat due to his sudden lack of spirit energy, Aizen finds himself overwhelmed by Ichigo's newly enhanced physical strength. Though his fear caused the Hōgyoku to turn him into a Hollow-like monster, Aizen barely survived Ichigo's final attack as he evolved once more to the point that he became immortal. However, Ichigo's attack weakened and defeated Aizen to the point that the Hōgyoku no longer acknowledges him as he is reverted to his human form while engulfed in a specially made kidō "Seal" that Urahara planted on him. Ten days later, numerous seals placed on his body to render him immobile and to keep his now vast reiatsu around his body, Aizen is sentenced by Central 46 to 18,800 years of imprisonment in the lowest underground prison, the 8th prison known as "Muken". Aizen's arrogance towards the matter results with him being gagged as the final seals are added and the sentence escalated to 20,000 years.

Later, when the Wandenreich invade the Soul Society, Yhwach asks Aizen to join up with them, but he refuses and delays the time sufficiently in conversation and he is forced to retreat. During the second invasion by the Wandenreich, with the Soul King's Palace breached, Aizen is visited by the new Head-Captain Shunsui Kyōraku. Initially believing Aizen is being responsive, entrusted with the keys to unlock the seals, Shunsui claims to have three as he unseals the gag so Aizen can speak. However, this act of kindness allows Aizen to remove the other seals on his own with the exception of the last two. Once freed, Aizen accompanies Shunsui to the Seireitei where his power is needed as Yhwach reached the Soul King's chambers and killed the deity while taking his powers for his own. Despite the other Soul Reapers flustered by Shunsui freeing him after what he put them through, Aizen uses his powers to destroy the shadowy creatures that Yhwach produced from his body, before creating a path to the Soul King's Palace. Aizen confronts Yhwach, playing a role in the final battle when he nearly gets himself killed using his Kyoka Suigetsu illusion to give Ichigo an opening to fatally wound Yhwach. In the end, hearing Yhwach's dying words following his defeat at Ichigo's hands, Aizen willingly returns to his cell.

Ten years later, Aizen senses that the last remnants of Yhwach's Reiatsu have disappeared completely. He recalls Yhwach's final words about how his defeat meant the continuation of death and the fear accompanying it, remarking that the world Yhwach wanted would be a failed paradise. He states to create such a world would result in one which would be without hope. He remarks while people could go through life simply living, it does not compare to courageous individuals like Ichigo, who is willing to face death and cut through fate without fear.

=== In other media ===
Aizen appears in video games for the series, the most recent ones with him in his post-Soul Society outfit. He also has his own Bleach Beat Collection, a brief CD of character image songs. The tracks are Shinsen. In 2021, Kubo made an illustration of Aizen to promote the Loki television series, drawn in a similar pose to the ephonymous character in a show's poster to emphasize the similarities in their traitorous and conniving personalities.

== Reception ==
"Aizen's villainous reveal drew a lot of new fans to the series because of how incredibly effective it was. Some fans heralded him as the greatest manga/anime villain in recent memory. He was intelligent, manipulative, confident, cold-hearted, ambitious, and he always had an ace up his sleeve whenever he seemed to be at even the slightest disadvantage. He struck an excellent balance between being cool as hell and incredibly detestable."

— Nik Freeman from Anime News Network

Charles White of IGN commented that the plot twist in the story and the truth about Aizen was "fascinating and interesting", but also criticized it, saying his Zanpakuto's power was "far-fetched" and overpowered, and Aizen did not have any flaws and that his betrayal was "too planned out to [be] believ[able]". Despite this, the change in mood accompanying Aizen's revelation as a villain was also praised; White praised the animators' job at "giving his face this evil thing about it" without changing anything about the animation itself, citing that "the Aizen that we first knew was the nicest guy ever, he looked it, and now this Aizen actually looks like the most evil jerk we've ever seen". Carl Kimlinger from Anime News Network comments that Aizen's revelation as an antagonist is "brutally unpredictable". He notes the violence from that part to be frustrating but in the same time satisfying, praising the large number of revelations. Aizen was additionally noted to have a remarkable development in his introduction as a villain with Kimlinger wondering "If only all villain grandstandings were so thrilling". Theron Martin from the same site noted that this scene makes the anime deserve credits for "one of the biggest 'I am a total bastard' moments in anime history". Mania Entertainment's Bryce Coulter noted that such episode "makes you [viewers] want to hate Aizen" due to how he controlled the character's actions in previous episodes and how he now easily defeats most of them. Aizen's English voice actor, Kyle Hebert, describes Aizen as a "mysterious, calm, cool character"" and that gives an air of "where does this guy come from?".

Nik Freeman of Anime News Network tried to summarize why Bleach's popularity declined between 2005 and 2015 from one of the most popular shonen series to "a shell of its former self that subsists on the memory of its glory days". Freeman's main thesis involving Aizen's declining popularity because of how Kubo changed his characterization within the series. The reviewer affirmed Aizen was the most important character on the series for most fans even surpassing Ichigo's influence. Initially a character that had "an excellent balance between being cool as hell and incredibly detestable", Aizen eventually "stopped bothering to devise clever schemes and instead relied purely on his own immense strength to get the job done. In other words, Aizen lost all the qualities that captivated fans when he first revealed himself as the villain." More positive was Carlo Santos from the same site who believed Aizen's character had grown "deliciously cruel" and that his ability to match the entirety of Soul Society via constantly-shifting technique made his battles "impossible to be bored with". Santos considered the battle between Aizen and Ichigo which ended Aizen's tenure as series villain a "predictable yet satisfying" scene which represented, for Tite Kubo, the culmination of many years of development as an artist. He felt, however, that after the years of buildup of Aizen as the villain, his defeat may have been too swift. Freeman was even more negative on the ending of Aizen's position as the series' main villain. He wrote that "when Aizen was defeated, the story felt finished" and that "a ton of people stopped reading at that point, even though it was widely known that the series would be continuing anyway". As part of 2018's April Fools, a joke was made by Shonen Jump stating Aizen took over the manga magazine.
