= Bleach season 12 =

Season of television series

Bleach
- Season 12
- The cover of the first DVD compilation released by Aniplex of Arrancar: Decisive Battle of Karakura arc, featuring Sozuke Aizen
- No. of episodes: 17

Release
- Original network: TV Tokyo
- Original release: March 31 – July 21, 2009

Season chronology
- ← Previous; Season 11 Next → Season 13

The episodes of the twelfth season of the Bleach anime series, released on DVD as the Arrancar: Decisive Battle of Karakura arc (破面・空座決戦篇, Arankaru Karakura Kessen Hen). They are directed by Noriyuki Abe, and produced by TV Tokyo, Dentsu, and Studio Pierrot. The 17-episode season is based on Tite Kubo's Bleach manga series. The season follows the fight between an army of Soul Reapers and Arrancars, with Genryūsai Shigekuni Yamamoto defending Karakura Town, and Sousuke Aizen planning to use the town to invade and destroy the Soul Society. The season moves on to auto-conclusive stories beginning with episode 227.

The season aired from March to July 2009 on TV Tokyo. The English adaptation of the Bleach anime is licensed by Viz Media, and aired on Cartoon Network's Adult Swim from July to November 2011. A total of four DVD volumes, each containing four episodes, have been released by Aniplex from January 27 to April 21, 2010.

The episodes use four pieces of theme music: two opening themes and two closing themes. The first two episodes use "Velonica" by Aqua Timez as the opening theme. The second opening theme, "Shōjo S" (少女S, Shōjo Esu; "Girls") by Scandal is used for the remainder of the season. The first ending theme, "Sky Chord (Otona ni Naru Kimi e)" (Sky chord 〜大人になる君へ〜, Sukai Kōdo ~Otona ni Naru Kimi e~; lit. "Sky Chord (To the Adult You)") by Shion Tsuji is used for the first two episodes. The second ending theme is "Kimi o Mamotte, Kimi o Aishite" (君を守って 君を愛して; "I Will Protect You, I Love You") by Sambomaster, used for the remainder of the season.

== Episodes ==
No. overall	No. in season	Title	Storyboarded by	Directed by	Written by	Original release date	English air date
213	1	"The Konso Cop Karakuraizer is Born"; Transliteration: "Konsō Deka Karakuraizā Tanjō" (Japanese: 魂葬刑事カラクライザー誕生)	Hodaka Kuramoto	Hodaka Kuramoto	Masahiro Ōkubo	March 31, 2009	July 17, 2011
Going back to the time when Ichigo Kurosaki, Uryū Ishida and Yasutora "Chad" Sado left the world of the living for Hueco Mundo with the help of Kisuke Urahara, the focus is now directed to the events that took place in Karakura Town during that time. Urahara feels that Karakura Town needs protection against hollows now that Ichigo left. In one night, he thinks of a fun way to protect the town, that is to force Kon into a team of hollow fighting superheroes called "Konso Cop Karakuraizer". Once Kon adjusts to his new hero suit, he meets the rest of the team, which includes Don Kanonji, Tatsuki Arisawa, Chizuru Honshō, Keigo Asano, and Ururu Tsumugiya, along with Zennosuke Kurumadani. After a successful fight with hollows, the team encounters a woman who appears to be an arrancar.
214	2	"Karakuraizer's Last Day"; Transliteration: "Karakuraizā Saigo no Hi" (Japanese: カラクライザー最後の日)	Yasuhiro Matsumura	Junya Koshiba	Masahiro Ōkubo	April 7, 2009	July 24, 2011
The assembled team from the previous episode is to infiltrate a gate that the arrancar are using to travel between Hueco Mundo and the world of the living. At the "Hollow Fortress", numerous hollows attack the team. Kanonji and Ururu stay behind to fight the hollows on the outside, and the others enter the "Hollow Fortress". Once inside, they meet one of the many arrancars from Hueco Mundo. Chizuru uses her "Hyper Erotic Powers" to distract the arrancar, and Keigo, Tatsuki and Kurumadani take care of the hollows inside. Kon travels to the center of the fortress, where he meets a hollow and kills it with his "Raiser Beam", exploding and destroying the heart of the fortress, and the fortress itself. In the end, Urahara erects a barrier around Karakura Town, and lulls its citizens, including the Konso Cop Karakuraizer, to sleep.
215	3	"Defend Karakura Town! Entire Appearance of the Shinigami"; Transliteration: "Karakura-chō o Mamore! Shinigami Sōtōjō" (Japanese: 空座町を護れ！死神総登場)	Hiroki Takagi	Mitsutaka Noshitani	Kento Shimoyama	April 14, 2009	July 31, 2011
Sousuke Aizen, Kaname Tōsen, and Gin Ichimaru arrive in Karakura town and are met by the remaining captains of the Thirteen Court Guard Squads and their lieutenants. Aizen states how he is aware that he is not in the real Karakura Town and says that after slaughtering them, he will make the Ōken in the Soul Society. He says that Las Noches is in the hands of Espada Ulquiorra Schiffer, at which Ulquiorra appears in the throne room behind Orihime Inoue. Ichigo Kurosaki senses his appearance and he rushes to the fifth tower where Ulquiorra and Orihime are located. It then goes back to the battle where the captains talk amongst themselves, when suddenly first division captain Genryūsai Shigekuni Yamamoto unleashes his shikai to trap Aizen, Tōsen and Gin. Back in Las Noches, Ulquiorra talks to Orihime, asking if she is scared, to which she replies she is not. The Exequias and their leader, Rudbornn Chelute, temporarily delay Ichigo. Rudbornn and his men attack, but are stopped by Chad, Rukia Kuchiki and Renji Abarai. Ichigo continues on his way eventually breaking through the floor into the throne room, ready to battle.
216	4	"Elite! The Four Shinigami"; Transliteration: "Seiei! Yonnin no Shinigami" (Japanese: 精鋭！四人の死神)	Hideyo Yamamoto	Junya Koshiba	Genki Yoshimura	April 21, 2009	August 7, 2011
Ichigo arrives in the fifth tower to save Orihime and confronts Ulquiorra. Ulquiorra unsheathes his sword and they begin their battle. Meanwhile, back at the replica of Karakura Town, Espada Baraggan Louisenbairn takes command since Aizen is trapped inside Yamamoto's fire prison. His first plan of action is to destroy the four pillars protecting Karakura Town, and he sends out four giant hollows to do the job. Soul Reapers Ikkaku Madarame, Yumichika Ayasegawa, Izuru Kira and Shūhei Hisagi each take one pillar, and after defeating the hollows with ease, are respectively matched up against Choe Neng Poww, Charlotte Chuhlhourne, Avirama Redder, and Findor Calius, four of Baraggan's six Fracciones. Each is introduced to the other and the battle for Karakura Town begins.
217	5	"Beautiful Little Devil Charlotte"; Transliteration: "Utsukushiki Koakuma Sharurotte" (Japanese: 美しき小悪魔シャルロッテ)	Hiroaki Nishimura	Taiji Kawanishi	Kento Shimoyama	April 28, 2009	August 14, 2011
In his fight, Izuru manages to draw blood against his opponent, Avirama, who proceeds to release his zanpakutō, Águila. Meanwhile, Yumichika and his opponent, Charlotte, continue their fight, but the two spar while declaring the other ugly. However, both decide that the victor shall be the most beautiful. Charlotte uses several attacks, which are able to injure Yumichika. When Yumichika manages to cut off some of the hair of Charlotte, the latter enrages and releases his zanpakutō, Reina de Rosas. Now stronger than Yumichika, the fight escalates until Charlotte traps Yumichika in a prison of black thorns, which completely encases the combatants and their reiatsu, hiding Yumichika's death from everyone. Upon hearing that his reiatsu is hidden, Yumichika reveals the true form of his zanpakutō, that of a sword with kidō abilities. With its power, he drains Charlotte's reiatsu, claiming victory.
218	6	"Kira, The Battle Within Despair"; Transliteration: "Kira, Zetsubō no Naka de no Tatakai" (Japanese: 吉良、絶望の中での戦い)	Hodaka Kuramoto	Rokou Ogiwara	Masahiro Ōkubo	May 5, 2009	August 21, 2011
Yumichika reveals that he uses a nickname for his zanpakutō to avoid revealing its kidō abilities so that he can fit in with the eleventh division, there being an unspoken rule against using them. The other fights continue elsewhere, and Findor reveals to Hisagi that he can chip off pieces of his mask to increase his power level. Izuru fights Avirama, whose resurrección turns him into a bird and enables him to attack Izuru with heavy steel feathers. Izuru uses his zanpakutō, Wabisuke, to make Avirama's wings too heavy to fly, and reveals that it represents the belief of the third division that war is full of despair. He then decapitates Avirama, noting afterward that he does not want to be forgiven.
219	7	"Hisagi's Shikai! The Name is..." Transliteration: "Hisagi Shikai! Sono na wa..." (Japanese: 檜佐木始解！その名は…)	Kazunori Mizuno	Kazunori Mizuno	Genki Yoshimura	May 12, 2009	August 28, 2011
Hisagi has difficulty fighting Findor, despite technically being on the same level of power. When Findor releases his zanpakutō, Pinza Aguda, and corners Hisagi with blasts of water, Hisagi reluctantly releases his zanpakutō, Kazeshini. With his zanpakutō released Hisagi overpowers Findor, seeing this Findor breaks off ninety percent of his mask, now making him much stronger, but Hisagi easily damages him leaving Findor paralyzed with fear. After overpowering Findor, Hisagi explains that Findor is inferior to him because Findor does not fear his own power. Findor makes a desperate attempt to defeat Hisagi with a cero blast, but is killed by Hisagi's zanpakutō. Meanwhile, Poww is able to defeat Ikkaku and destroy the pillar he had been guarding. Yumichika says his name as he sees Ikkaku defeated.
220	8	"Ikkaku Falls! The Shinigami's Crisis"; Transliteration: "Ikkaku Taoreru! Shinigami no Kiki" (Japanese: 一角倒れる！死神の危機)	Yasuhito Nishikata	Yasuhito Nishikata	Kento Shimoyama	May 19, 2009	September 4, 2011
As a result of the pillar being destroyed, the real Karakura Town starts to return, but seventh division lieutenant Tetsuzaemon Iba manages to stop it while his captain Sajin Komamura faces Poww. Yumichika desperately tries to go after his friend Ikkaku after realizing he had been defeated, but is knocked unconscious by Hisagi and Izuru for his own good. Poww knocks Komamura aside with a single punch in his unreleased state, and releasing his zanpakutō, Calderón, vastly increases his size and tries to finish off Ikkaku and Iba. Komamura, however, manages to overpower and defeat him easily with his bankai. Iba reprimands Ikkaku for failing to protect the pillar because of his desire to avoid revealing his own strength, and tells him that if he wishes to fight, he must carry out his orders even at the cost of his own life. Baraggan grows visibly angry because of the defeat of his Fracciones.
221	9	"The Full Showdown! Shinigami vs. Espada"; Transliteration: "Zenmen Taiketsu! Shinigami VS Esupāda" (Japanese: 全面対決！死神VS十刃)	Hiroaki Nishimura	Hiroaki Nishimura	Masahiro Ōkubo	May 26, 2009	September 11, 2011
Barragan's two remaining Fracciones, Ggio Vega and Nirgge Parduoc, offer to deal with the other Soul Reapers themselves, ending up facing against second division captain Suì-Fēng and lieutenant Marechiyo Ōmaeda. The respective eighth and thirteenth division captains Shunsui Kyōraku and Jūshirō Ukitake face Coyote Stark, but are unwilling to fight against his Fracción, Lilinette Gingerbuck. While tenth division captain Tōshirō Hitsugaya begins fighting Tier Halibel, lieutenant Rangiku Matsumoto begins fighting her Fracciones, who are able to defend themselves against the ability of her zanpakutō by using the cero blast. While Ōmaeda struggles against Nirgge, Suì-Fēng is able to pin Ggio to the wall and releases her zanpakutō.
222	10	"The Most Evil Tag!? Suì-Fēng & Ōmaeda"; Transliteration: "Saikyō Taggu!? Soifon & Ōmaeda" (Japanese: 最凶タッグ!?砕蜂&大前田)	Hodaka Kuramoto	Hodaka Kuramoto	Kento Shimoyama	June 2, 2009	September 18, 2011
Ggio manages to free himself and fights back against Suì-Fēng, chiding her for not finishing him off when she had the chance. He releases his zanpakutō, Tigre Estoque, and continues fighting her, seeming to be of equal or greater skill. Ōmaeda continues fighting Nirgge, and while it appears that Nirgge can keep up with his speed even in his slower release state named Mamut, Ōmaeda reveals that he had only pretended to be slow, and manages to outmaneuver Nirgge and bash him in the head with his zanpakutō, Gegetsuburi. Despite this, Nirgge gets up again, only to be knocked down again when Ggio accidentally knocks Suì-Fēng at his head.
223	11	"A Miraculous Body! Ggio Releases"; Transliteration: "Kyōi no Nikutai! Jio Kaihō" (Japanese: 驚異の肉体！ジオ解放)	Junya Koshiba	Takeshi Yamaguchi	Kento Shimoyama	June 9, 2009	September 25, 2011
Suì-Fēng continues fighting Ggio, and is pinned down. Nirgge gets up and tries attacking Ōmaeda again, but he defeats him and tries to help Suì-Fēng. Ggio is about to shoot Ōmaeda with a cero blast, but Suì-Fēng breaks free and knocks Ōmaeda away before Ggio can kill him, revealing that she had hoped to study the resurrección form of an arrancar before facing the Espadas. Ggio then responds by turning into his resurrección form to grow stronger, but Suì-Fēng kills him easily with her the ability of her zanpakutō. She and Ōmaeda then go to face Baraggan.
224	12	"3 vs. 1 Battle! Rangiku's Crisis"; Transliteration: "3 vs 1 no Sentō! Pinchi no Rangiku" (Japanese: 3vs1の戦闘！ピンチの乱菊)	Hodaka Kuramoto	Tomoko Hiramukai	Kento Shimoyama	June 16, 2009	October 2, 2011
Rangiku fights Tier Halibel's three Fracciones, those being Emilou Apacci, Franceska Mila Rose, and Cyan Sung-Sun. She struggles against them until fifth division lieutenant Momo Hinamori arrives, having resolved to fight against her former captain. Momo uses a kidō combination that seriously injures the three Fracciones, but they heal their wounds by releasing their zanpakutō, and use their left arms to create a strange creature that shares their traits. Elsewhere, Kyōraku continues his battle with Stark, but neither is willing to release their zanpakutō.
225	13	"Vice-Captains Annihilated! The Terrifying Demonic Beast"; Transliteration: "Fukutaichō Zenmetsu! Kyōfu no Yōjū" (Japanese: 副隊長全滅！恐怖の妖獣)	Hiroaki Nishimura	Taiji Kawanishi	Kento Shimoyama	June 23, 2009	October 9, 2011
Lilynette attempts to fight Ukitake, but he is able to effortlessly block her attacks and tells her to give up, angering her. The fused creature named Ayon is able to severely wound Rangiku and Momo with little effort, but Hisagi and Izuru arrive to save them. Hisagi attempts to fight Ayon while Izuru tends to Momo and Rangiku's wounds, but Ayon overpowers him. Iba tries to intervene, but Ayon pushes him aside with a cero blast from a hidden eye. It tosses Hisagi aside and advances on Izuru, but Yamamoto, disappointed that his men are unable to defeat it, steps in to fight it, wounding it with his staff.
226	14	"Fierce Fighting Concludes? Towards a New Battle!"; Transliteration: "Gekitō Shūketsu? Aratanaru Tatakai e!" (Japanese: 激闘終結？新たなる戦いへ！)	Kazunori Mizuno	Kazunori Mizuno	Masahiro Ōkubo	June 30, 2009	October 16, 2011
Ayon goes into a rage after being wounded by Yamamoto and increases in size, but Yamamoto easily defeats it and Halibel's three Fracciones. Hitsugaya struggles against Halibel, who reveals that she is the Third Espada and then hits him with a torrent of energy. Kyōraku fights Stark, who reveals that he is the First Espada. Elsewhere in Las Noches, Chad and Renji have defeated the Exequias, as Rukia is left to battle Rudbornn. Ichigo continues his fight with Ulquiorra, and despite Ulquiorra's claim that Ichigo's friends and the Soul Reapers will be defeated, Ichigo has faith in their victory and continues to fight against him.
227	15	"Wonderful Error"; Transliteration: "Wandafuru Erā" (Japanese: ワンダフル・エラー)	Hiroki Takagi	Rokou Ogiwara	Genki Yoshimura	July 7, 2009	October 23, 2011
In the world of the living, much of the main class is attending their first day at Karakura High School. Ichigo and Chad met and befriend Keigo and Mizuiro Kojima while saving Keigo from some thugs. Orihime meets Chizuru, who tries to woo her only to be kicked in retaliation by Tatsuki. In the Soul Society, the lieutenants meet and decide to promote Renji to the lieutenant of the sixth division and send Rukia to Karakura Town. Renji discusses his promotion with his friends, but decides to make it a surprise for when Rukia gets back. Rukia, after speaking with her captain and third seat officers, heads to Karakura town, at the same time as the first episode begins.
228	16	"Summer! Sea! Swimsuit Festival!!"; Transliteration: "Natsu da! Umi da! Mizugisai!!" (Japanese: 夏だ！海だ！水着祭!!)	Junya Koshiba	Mitsutaka Noshitani	Masahiro Ōkubo	July 14, 2009	October 30, 2011
The Soul Reapers decide to take a vacation to the ocean in the world of the living because captain Byakuya Kuchiki destroyed the pool the Women's Soul Reaper Association covertly built in his mansion. The association shop for swimsuits and then head for the beach where everyone meets up. After attending Ukitake's weak body from the heat, they form groups to produce works of art on the beach for a competition. Watermelon-like monsters attack and most of the Soul Reapers are helpless against them without their zanpakutō until Yoruichi Shihōin and Suì-Fēng defeat them. It is then revealed that Retsu Unohana arranged the event with Byakuya and Ukitake as a game of splitting watermelons, and several more arrived as the episode ends.
229	17	"Cry of the Soul? The Rug Shinigami is Born!"; Transliteration: "Tamashii no Sakebi? Zura Shinigami Tanjō!" (Japanese: 魂の叫び？ヅラ死神誕生！)	Hiroaki Nishimura	Hiroaki Nishimura	Kento Shimoyama	July 21, 2009	November 6, 2011
Ikkaku and Yumichika travel to Karakura Town on an assignment to catch a hollow that had attacked a convoy in the Soul Society. The two travel to Ichigo's house planning to stay there until their assignment is complete. Ichigo, however, turns them down and takes them to Keigo's house. Keigo's sister, Mizuho Asano, is all over Ikkaku until Yumichika glues a wig to his head. Mizuho gets upset and makes life difficult for the pair. After a falling out with Mizuho, Ikkaku and Yumichika camp outside instead. While Mizuho with Keigo to buy some juice, she is attacked by the hollow. After some difficulty removing the wig from himself, Ikkaku gets to the scene and saves Mizuho. The next day, Ikkaku and Yumichika prepare to return home. Mizuho knows Ikkaku rescued her and both of them return to good terms.
