= Bleach season 11 =

Season of television series

Bleach
- Season 11
- The cover of the first DVD compilation released by Aniplex of The Past Arc, featuring the Vizards
- No. of episodes: 7

Release
- Original network: TV Tokyo
- Original release: February 10 – March 24, 2009

Season chronology
- ← Previous; Season 10 Next → Season 12

The eleventh season of the Bleach anime series, released on DVD as The Past Arc (過去篇, Kako Hen), is directed by Noriyuki Abe, and produced by TV Tokyo, Dentsu, and Studio Pierrot. The seven episode season is based on Tite Kubo's Bleach manga series. The season follows the flashback arc of the series' past storyline about Kisuke Urahara, Yoruichi Shihōin, and a group of Vizards, framed by former Soul Reaper lieutenant Sousuke Aizen, and exiled from the Soul Society to the real world.

The season aired from February to March 2009 on TV Tokyo. The English adaptation of the anime is licensed by Viz Media, which aired on Cartoon Network's Adult Swim from May to July 2011. Aniplex collected the season in a series of two DVD compilations. The first DVD volume was released on November 26, 2009, and the second on December 16 of the same year.

The episodes use two pieces of theme music: one opening theme and one closing theme. The opening theme is "Velonica" by Aqua Timez while the ending theme is "Sky Chord (Otona ni Naru Kimi e)" (Sky chord 〜大人になる君へ〜, Sukai Kōdo ~Otona ni Naru Kimi e~; lit. 'Sky Chord (To the Adult You)') by Shion Tsuji.

== Episodes ==
No. overall	No. in season	Title	Storyboarded by	Directed by	Written by	Original release date	English air date
206	1	"The Past Chapter Begins! The Truth from 110 Years Ago"; Transliteration: "Kako Hen Kaishi! Hyakujū Nen Mae no Shinjitsu" (Japanese: 過去編開始！110年前の真実)	Masami Anno	Rokou Ogiwara	Michiko Yokote	February 10, 2009	May 29, 2011
One hundred and ten years before the start of the series, then-fifth division captain Shinji Hirako is approached by then-fifth division lieutenant Sousuke Aizen as they attend preparations for the introduction of the new twelfth division captain. Squad two captain Yoruichi Shihōin tells her 3rd seat Kisuke Urahara that she has recommended him for the position as the new twelfth division captain while they are sparring in their private training area. Her subordinate Suì-Fēng, immediately distrusting Urahara because of what she has seen of his personality and behavior, follows him around town to prove to Yoruichi that he is not worthy of the responsibility required for the new position. Yoruichi, however, after seeing Suì-Fēng's proof on paper, disregards it as a love letter. Urahara and a team of Soul Reapers leave to tail a group of deserters who abandoned the Seireitei. After singlehandedly defeating them, Urahara passes the captain qualification exam and later shows up late to his first captains meeting.
207	2	"12th Division's New Captain, Kisuke Urahara"; Transliteration: "Jūnibantai Shin Taichō, Urahara Kisuke" (Japanese: 十二番隊新隊長、浦原喜助)	Shigeyuki Miya	Yasuhito Nishikata	Masashi Sogo	February 17, 2009	June 5, 2011
Urahara is appointed the twelfth division captain in a ceremony attended by the other captains and introduces himself to his squad. Lieutenant Hiyori Sarugaki is the only one who does not respect him. She makes a scene while his things are loaded into his new room and challenges him to a match to see if he really can hold up to his promise of not letting danger befall the twelfth division. The squad members are led to believe that their captain is weak when he falls easily at Hiyori's attack, but he actually lost on purpose, not wanting to embarrass her. Later that night, Hirako tells Urahara that Hiyori loved the previous captain of the twelfth division like a mother and that she would be difficult to replace in her heart. The next day, Hiyori sees Urahara's office and is shocked by how much he has changed it since the previous captain was there.
208	3	"Aizen and the Genius Boy"; Transliteration: "Aizen to Tensai Shōnen" (Japanese: 藍染と天才少年)	Hideyo Yamamoto	Tomoko Hiramu	Rika Nakase	February 24, 2009	June 12, 2011
Urahara takes Hiyori to the Maggots Nest, explaining on the way that its purpose is to hold people deemed potentially dangerous by the Soul Society. While they are walking through the penitentiary, a large prisoner attacks Hiyori, but Urahara easily subdues the man with his bare hand. Deep inside, Urahara approaches a younger Mayuri Kurotsuchi and offers to make him second-in-command of a new division he is creating, the Department of Research and Development. Elsewhere, a young Byakuya Kuchiki is shown to have had a quick temper at that age, proven when Yoruichi steals his hair ribbon before escaping, taunting him by putting her breasts against his head in the process. Thirteenth division captain Jūshirō Ukitake asks Kaien Shiba to be his lieutenant and tells him of a prodigy who graduated from the Soul Reaper Academy in just one year and has already secured a seat position within the Gotei 13. The boy is revealed to be a young Gin Ichimaru who easily slays the third seat officer of the fifth division under the watchful and impressed eye of Aizen.
209	4	"Muguruma 9th Division, Moves Out"; Transliteration: "Muguruma Kyūbantai, Shutsudōse Yo" (Japanese: 六車九番隊、出動せよ)	Hitoyuki Matsui	Eiko Nishi	Genki Yoshimura	March 3, 2009	June 19, 2011
Nine years later, three shadowed figures watch as citizens of the Rukongai are attacked and killed by a strange white substance. Hirako, Aizen, Mayuri, Hiyori, and Urahara meet and discuss the recent disappearances of the Rukongai citizens. Captain Kensei Muguruma and his ninth division are deployed to assess the situation and find a gigantic hollow attacking three boys. Kensei Muguruma saves one of the boys, a younger Shūhei Hisagi, from certain death. Later on, in Mayuri and Urahara's lab, Hiyori is chosen from the twelfth division to go collect samples from the site of recent disappearances. Kensei and the rest of his squad camp in the woods, looking for a clue to explain the recent events. Izaemon Tōdō, one of his subordinates, seemingly kills Kaname Tōsen, the 6th seat at the time, and the rest of the group, before he is mysteriously struck down himself by an unseen attacker. Kensei, the only one left, is imprisoned in a well of darkness and impaled with a blade. When the darkness lifts, he recognizes his attacker.
210	5	"Hiyori Dies? The Beginning of Tragedy"; Transliteration: "Hiyori Shisu? Higeki no Hajimari" (Japanese: ひよ里死す? 悲劇の始まり)	Hiroaki Nishimura	Hiroaki Nishimura	Masahiro Ōkubo	March 10, 2009	June 26, 2011
The spiritual pressures of Kensei and his squad vanish, sparking a dire situation in the Soul Society. An emergency captains meeting is held to determine who will investigate the situation. Urahara arrives late and pleads his case to go, but Genryūsai Shigekuni Yamamoto does not grant his request. Instead, Hirako, Captains Love Aikawa (7th division) and Rōjūrō "Rose" Otoribashi (3rd division), Lieutenant Lisa Yadomaru of the 8th division, and Hachigen Ushōda from the Kidō Corps are dispatched. In the woods, Hiyori is attacked by a grotesque and powerful hollow revealed to be Kensei. Hirako arrives to save her and engages Kensei along with the rest of the new team. Soon the ninth division lieutenant Mashiro Kuna, who has also transformed into a hollow, appears and attacks the group. Hachigen binds both Mashiro and Kensei, but the latter escapes through brute strength alone. Meanwhile, Urahara is torn at his decision to send Hiyori out alone and defies orders that he is not to go, using a cloak that completely masks his energy. Before he can set out, Tessai Tsukabishi, commander of the Kidō Corps, appears and offers to accompany him.
211	6	"Betrayal! Aizen's Secret Maneuvers"; Transliteration: "Uragiri! An'yaku no Aizen" (Japanese: 裏切り！暗躍の藍染)	Shigeyuki Miya	Mitsue Yamazaki	Kento Shimoyama	March 17, 2009	July 3, 2011
The eighth division captain Shunsui Kyōraku is out late when he happens upon a young Nanao Ise, his future lieutenant, who wonders if Lisa will be alright. During his stroll, he and other squad members encounter Lieutenant Aizen who also appears to be up late. Kensei's new abilities overpower most of the group, until Hachi finally binds him with a powerful spell. Hirako is then brutally attacked by Hiyori, who is now a hollow as well. Tōsen arrives and incapacitates the group, with the exception of Hirako who asks why he betrayed his captain. Aizen appears with Gin and reveals his own betrayal, explaining to Hirako that his illusion-casting zanpakutō had disguised another person as a stand-in for himself during his interactions with Hirako all this time. Hirako and the rest of the group begin transforming into hollows, but Hirako manages to hang onto his consciousness. Aizen prepares to finish off Hirako, but Urahara and Tessai arrive to stop him.
212	7	"Rescue Hirako! Aizen vs. Urahara"; Transliteration: "Hirako o Sukue! Aizen VS Urahara" (Japanese: 平子を救え！藍染VS浦原)	Hideyo Yamamoto	Ōkura Shirakawa	Masashi Sogo	March 24, 2009	July 10, 2011
Upon observing the bodies of the injured group and recalling the missing souls, Urahara concludes someone has been experimenting with hollowfication in the Soul Society. Aizen initially feigns innocence, but then turns to leave with Gin and Tōsen in tow, blocking a kidō attack from Tessai as they escape. Using a forbidden technique, Tessai transports the affected back to the twelfth division research facilities where Urahara shows Tessai an object he created that may be useful in saving those undergoing the hollowfication process: the Orb of Distortion. The next day, Urahara and Tessai are arrested and brought before Central Forty-Six where they are falsely accused as the ones responsible for Aizen's acts. Urahara insists that they have been framed by Lieutenant Aizen, but his protests are ignored as several witnesses saw Aizen never leave the Seireitei the night before. Urahara is sentenced to banishment in the World of the Living, but just before the two are detained, Yoruichi breaks in and takes them back to her hideout, along with the eight Soul Reapers undergoing hollowfication who have since stabilized. Urahara declares that he will find a way to save them. Time flashes forward to present day at the Vizards' headquarters. Hirako states that they appreciate what they have become thanks to Urahara and Aizen, and the group leaves.
