= Bleach season 9 =

Season of television series

Bleach
- Season 9
- The cover of the first DVD compilation released by Aniplex of The New Captain Shūsuke Amagai arc, featuring Ichigo Kurosaki
- No. of episodes: 22

Release
- Original network: TV Tokyo
- Original release: April 23 – October 7, 2008

Season chronology
- ← Previous; Season 8 Next → Season 10

The ninth season of the Bleach anime series is named The New Captain Shūsuke Amagai arc (新隊長天貝繍助篇, Shin Taichō Amagai Shūsuke Hen). The series is based on Tite Kubo's Bleach manga series. The episodes are directed by Noriyuki Abe, and produced by TV Tokyo, Dentsu, and Studio Pierrot. The season is an original, self-contained filler story arc that focuses on the introduction of a new Soul Reaper captain, Shūsuke Amagai, and the mystery surrounding the Kasumiōji clan, one of the families that constitute the nobility of Soul Society. It is the first season of the anime series to be produced in 16:9 widescreen.

The season aired from April to October 2008. The English adaptation of the Bleach anime is licensed by Viz Media, and aired on Cartoon Network's Adult Swim from August 2010 to January 2011. Five DVD compilations, each containing four episodes of the season, have been released by Aniplex. The first DVD compilation was released on November 26, 2008, and the fifth on March 25, 2009. A DVD box set was published by Viz Media on December 13, 2011.

The episodes use three pieces of theme music: one opening theme and two closing themes. The opening theme is "Chu-Bura" by Kelun. The first closing theme is "Orange" by Lil'B, used for episodes 168 to 179, and the second closing theme is "Gallop" by pe'zmoku, used for the remainder of the episodes.

== Episodes ==
| No. overall | No. in season | Title | Storyboarded by | Directed by | Written by | Original release date | English air date |
|---|---|---|---|---|---|---|---|
| 168 | 1 | "The New Captain Appears! His Name Is Shūsuke Amagai"; Transliteration: "Shin Taichō Tōjō! Sono Namae wa Amagai Shūsuke" (Japanese: 新隊長登場！その名前は天貝繍助) | Natsuko Suzuki | Mitsutaka Noshitani | Masashi Sogo | April 23, 2008 | August 29, 2010 |
Shūsuke Amagai, a member of a group that hunts down hollows, is unanimously appointed by the Thirteen Court Guard Squads as the new captain of the third division. He appoints Makoto Kibune as his third seat officer. However, Amagai and Kibune are not well-received by the third division members. On the suggestion of tenth division lieutenant Rangiku Matsumoto, Izuru Kira, the third division lieutenant, holds a welcoming party for Amagai, but Amagai collapses after one drink due to his low tolerance for alcohol. Gillians invade the Dangai, the dimension between the Soul Society and the human world, and the third division is ordered to destroy them. Kira leaves with the third division members. While fighting the hollows, the Kōtotsu, the cleanser of the dimension, somehow gets called in leaving the third division in a race to escape before being "cleansed". During their escape Amagai appears, and with a last minute rescue, destroys the Kōtotsu with ease. Then once they have calmed from their near death experience, they find out that Amagai is actually still drunk.
| 169 | 2 | "New Development, the Dangerous Transfer Student Appears!"; Transliteration: "Shin Tenkai, Kiken na Tenkōsei Arawaru!" (Japanese: 新展開、危険な転校生現る！) | Noriyuki Abe | Yasuhito Nishikata | Masashi Sogo | May 7, 2008 | September 5, 2010 |
Lurichiyo Kasumiōji, a young princess of the Soul Society nobility, and her Soul Reaper assistants Ryūsei "Kenryū" Kenzaki and Ruzaburō "Enryū" Enkōgawa travel to Karakura Town to acquire sweets for Lurichiyo. Kenryū and Enryū leave and Lurichiyo starts to wander the town. Meanwhile, Ichigo Kurosaki and Rukia Kuchiki are alerted to an abnormal amount of hollow sightings. As they leave to dispatch them, Ichigo encounters Lurichiyo, who asks him for sweets and is attacked by hollows. As Kenryū and Enryū take Lurichiyo away, Ichigo uses his bankai to defeat the hollows, impressing Kenryū and Enryū. The following day, they move into the house adjacent to Ichigo, becoming students at his school.
| 170 | 3 | "Desperate Struggle Under the Moonlit Night, the Mysterious Assassin and Zanpakutō"; Transliteration: "Tsukiyo no Shitō, Nazo no Shikaku to Zanpakutō" (Japanese: 月夜の死闘、謎の刺客と斬魄刀) | Shigenori Kageyama | Kiyomu Fukuda | Masashi Sogo | May 14, 2008 | September 12, 2010 |
Ichigo repeatedly asks Kenryū and Enryū why Lurichiyo is in the real world, and they refuse to answer him. That evening, an assassin arrives at Lurichiyo's home. The assassin uses a weapon with a mirror that reflects the moonlight to stun Ichigo, and nearly kills him. Ichigo uses his sword to reflect the moonlight against the assassin on his second try, and rather than be questioned, the assassin allows himself to be killed when Ichigo uses his Getsuga Tenshō. Afterward, Kenryū reveals that Lurichiyo is the heir to the noble Kasumiōji clan. He further explains that Gyōkaku Kumoi, one of caretakers serving the Kasumiōji clan, has been attempting to take control of the clan by killing Lurichiyo. Under pressure from Rukia, Ichigo agrees to protect Lurichiyo.
| 171 | 4 | "Kenryū, the Profusion of Blooming Crimson Flowers"; Transliteration: "Kenryū, Sakimidareru Beni no Hana" (Japanese: 犬龍、咲き乱れる紅の華) | Takeshi Shirai Yasuhito Nishikata | Tomoko Hiramuki | Genki Yoshimura | May 21, 2008 | September 19, 2010 |
Ichigo and Rukia take Lurichiyo through the town, and they later have dinner at Ichigo's house. After Ichigo starts an argument with Lurichiyo over her refusal to eat carrots, he accidentally reveals that Kenryū and Enryū hired him as a bodyguard. Furious, Lurichiyo runs towards the river, where she meets Orihime Inoue. They are attacked by an assassin wielding a guan dao, who can fire energy blasts that solidify into rock walls. Ichigo, Rukia, Kenryū and Enryū arrive. Kenryū uses his shikai to immobilize the assassin, allowing Ichigo to defeat him. However, the assassin commits suicide by collapsing a rock wall on himself. After the group leaves, Kumoi's head assassin, Hanza Nukui, retrieves the dead assassin's weapon. The next morning, Kenryū and Enryū realize that Lurichiyo is missing.
| 172 | 5 | "Kibune Goes to War! The Violent Wind that Rages"; Transliteration: "Kibune Shutsujin! Fukiareru Reppū" (Japanese: 貴船出陣！吹き荒れる烈風) | Jun'ya Koshiba | Akira Shimizu | Masahiro Ōkubo | May 28, 2008 | September 26, 2010 |
Amagai orders the third division to perform several menial missions and training exercises to build trust within the division members. However, Kira believes that Amagai wishes to replace him with Kibune due to attention the division members give to him. One evening, Kira and Kibune investigate an old execution ground with division member Shinta Seko. The three fall into the execution pit, which is filled with caged hollows. Kira and Kibune easily defeat the hollows, but one of the hollows manages to absorb Shinta. When Kibune attempts to kill the hollow with Shinta, Kira stops his attack, and Kibune state that Shinta's lack of skill as the reason he should die. Amagai arrives and reveals that he created the entire affair. The following morning, Lurichiyo enters the Kasumiōji family household.
| 173 | 6 | "The Appearance of the Great Evil! The Darkness in the House of Kasumiōji"; Transliteration: "Kyoaku no Tōjō! Kasumiōji-ka no Yami" (Japanese: 巨悪の登場！霞大路家の闇) | Hodaka Kuramoto | Hodaka Kuramoto | Rika Nakase | June 4, 2008 | October 3, 2010 |
Kumoi discovers that Lurichiyo has entered the household, and orders Hanza to kill her. Ichigo, Rukia, Kenryū and Enryū arrive in the compound and separate to find her. Kenryū and Enryū are then locked in a storehouse by Kumoi, while Rukia encounters eleventh division captain Kenpachi Zaraki. He realizes that Ichigo is present and goes to find him, as Ichigo eventually finds Lurichiyo. However, Ichigo is forced to evade the guards, losing track of her. Lurichiyo is attacked by one of her child servants, later revealed as an assassin. Zaraki arrives to intervene and kills the assassin, and Rukia later asks Zaraki to keep the incident a secret. Watching from a distance, Hanza tries to frighten Ichigo by releasing his spiritual pressure, but is surprised when Ichigo is unperturbed.
| 174 | 7 | "Break the Mirror's Boundary! Ichigo's Captivity"; Transliteration: "Kagami no Kyōkai o Yabure! Toraware no Ichigo" (Japanese: 鏡の境界を破れ！捕らわれの一護) | Hiroaki Nishimura | Hiroaki Nishimura | Masashi Sogo | June 11, 2008 | October 10, 2010 |
Kumoi eliminates the remaining clan members that oppose him to consolidate his power. In Karakura Town, Kisuke Urahara finds that there has been a shortage of a type of spirit particles, and theorizes that this is linked to the activities of the Kasumiōji clan. Kumoi sends Hanza and a dozen assassins to kill Ichigo, his friends, and Lurichiyo. Hanza fights Ichigo using the mirror weapon an assassin previously used against Ichigo, and explains that the weapon, known as Saiga, is stronger by feeding on his spiritual energy. Hanza traps Ichigo in a separate dimension using Saiga. Ichigo is freed by Yoruichi Shihōin, who reveals that the remaining assassins have been defeated. Hearing this, Hanza retreats. The following day, Kumoi installs Lurichiyo's fiancé, Shū Kannogi, as the head of the clan.
| 175 | 8 | "The Revenging Assassin, Ichigo is Targeted"; Transliteration: "Fukushū no Shikaku, Nerawareta Ichigo" (Japanese: 復讐の刺客、狙われた一護) | Jun'ya Koshiba | Mitsutaka Noshitani | Genki Yoshimura | June 18, 2008 | October 17, 2010 |
Having failed in his previous attempt to kill Lurichiyo, Hanza gathers three of his subordinates from the criminal underground and requests that they be given weapons similar to Saiga. Kumoi agrees and the four set out to kill Lurichiyo, Ichigo, and his friends. In Karakura Town, Lurichiyo tells Ichigo that others would frequently be blamed for her reckless actions, including Kenryū and Enryū. Sensing the arrival of Hanza and his subordinates, Ichigo and Rukia stay to protect Lurichiyo, while Uryū Ishida and Yasutora "Chad" Sado leave to confront their attackers. Hanza fights Ichigo as Rukia, Uryū and Chad each begin to fight one of his subordinates.
| 176 | 9 | "Mystery! The Sword-Consuming Assassin"; Transliteration: "Kaiki! Katana o Kuu Ansatsusha" (Japanese: 怪奇！刀を喰う暗殺者) | Tetsuhito Saitō | Taiji Kawanishi | Masahiro Ōkubo | June 25, 2008 | October 24, 2010 |
Rukia's opponent, Jinnai Dōkō, reveals that the unique blades the assassins are using are called bakōtō, swords that consume the user's spiritual energy to increase their strength. Jinnai eats his bakōtō to increase his power and fire blades from his back. Uryū fights Kuzuryū, who uses his bakōtō to transform into mist. Chad fights Genba, who uses the same rock wall-forming bakōtō a previous assassin used. Chad repeatably destroys the walls with his energy blasts, but Genba fuses with the walls to attack Chad from behind.
| 177 | 10 | "The Reversal of Rukia! The Rampaging Blade"; Transliteration: "Gyakuten no Rukia! Bōsōsuru Yaiba" (Japanese: 逆転のルキア、暴走する刀) | Yasuhito Nishikata | Yasuhito Nishikata | Masahiro Ōkubo Masashi Sogo | June 25, 2008 | October 31, 2010 |
Rukia uses kidō to restrain Jinnai, and freezes him with her shikai. He breaks free from the ice, but is consumed by his bakōtō when it draws too much energy from him. Before Rukia can retrieve the bakōtō, several assassins arrive and take it. Uryū realizes that Kuzuryū is using his bakōtō to fuse with the surrounding mist, and uses Sprenger to defeat him. However, Uryū is caught in the blast radius and is injured. Chad destroys the surrounding walls to stop Genba's attacks, and, in a clash between the strongest attacks of the combatants, Chad is victorious. Ichigo fights Hanza, and, using the enhanced speed from his bankai, breaks Saiga's mirror. In response, Hanza uses one of Saiga's abilities to engulfs Ichigo in light from the shards of the mirror.
| 178 | 11 | "The Nightmare Which is Shown, Ichigo's Inside the Mirror"; Transliteration: "Miserareta Akumu, Kagami no Naka no Ichigo" (Japanese: 見せられた悪夢、鏡の中の一護) | Manabu Fukazawa | Hodaka Kuramoto | Masashi Sogo | July 2, 2008 | November 7, 2010 |
Sealed inside a different dimension, Ichigo is forced to relive his childhood and his mother's death. Reflecting Ichigo's guilt for being unable to save his mother, the image of Ichigo's mother tries to kill him. Ichigo manages to break free of the dimension by making peace with his mother. Ichigo dons his hollow mask and overwhelms Hanza, forcing him to allow his bakōtō to absorb more of his energy. However, Hanza is consumed by his bakōtō, ignoring Ichigo's pleas to stop. Meanwhile in the Soul Society, Kira covertly follows Kibune to the Kasumiōji compound, where Kuzuryū returns to report the death of his comrades to Kumoi. In response, Kumoi orders Kibune to kill him.
| 179 | 12 | "Confrontation!? Amagai vs. Gotei 13"; Transliteration: "Tairitsu!? Amagai VS Gotei Jūsantai" (Japanese: 対立!?天貝VS護廷十三隊) | Jun'ya Koshiba | Akira Shimizu | Kento Shimoyama | July 9, 2008 | November 14, 2010 |
Amagai proposes joint training between the squads of the Thirteen Court Guard Squads, citing the attack of the cleaners against his squad, but his request is denied. That night, Kira confronts Kibune for entering the Kasumiōji compound, and Kibune denies he did so. An alarm activates shortly afterwards, revealing that there are hollows in the Seireitei. Despite Kira's orders, the third division members follow Kibune to attack the hollows. The various squads fail to reach the hollows due to the lack of coordination between them. Amagai takes control of the situation and coordinates the squads in destroying the hollows. Elsewhere, Genryūsai Shigekuni Yamamoto, the first division captain, reveals that he orchestrated the attack to test Amagai, and approves the joint training.
| 180 | 13 | "The Princess's Decision, the Sorrowful Bride"; Transliteration: "Hime no Ketsui, Kanashiki Hanayome" (Japanese: 姫の決意、哀しき花嫁) | Hiroaki Nishimura | Hiroaki Nishimura | Genki Yoshimura | July 16, 2008 | November 21, 2010 |
Kumoi schedules Lurichiyo's wedding for the following day, and Kenryū and Enryū realize that he will replace her with an imposter if Lurichiyo does not return for the wedding. Ichigo goes to speak with Lurichiyo, who reveals that she knew about the true goal of the assassins and Kumoi's connection to them, feeling guilty that Chad and Uryu were injured. She escapes into the Soul Society, intending to participate in the marriage to keep Kumoi in line; however, when she arrives on the other side, her eyes have gone blank and she expresses no desire to leave. Ichigo, Rukia, Kenryū and Enryū attempt to follow them, but are unable to reach Lurichiyo, as Kenryū and Enryū have been blamed for kidnapping her. On the day of the wedding, the four enter the compound to retrieve Lurichiyo, but second division captain Suì-Fēng and several members of the second division surround them, and Lurichiyo does not respond to Ichigo's calls to her.
| 181 | 14 | "The 2nd Division Sorties! Ichigo is Surrounded"; Transliteration: "Nibantai Shutsugeki! Hōisareta Ichigo" (Japanese: 二番隊出撃！包囲された一護) | Jun'ya Koshiba | Yasuhito Nishikata | Masahiro Ōkubo | July 23, 2008 | November 28, 2010 |
Enryū uses his shikai to destroy the building, and in the confusion, Ichigo reaches Lurichiyo. Revealing Kumoi's intention to gain control of the clan to Shū, Ichigo is attacked by Lurichiyo, who is revealed as an imposter. Suì-Fēng begins to fight Ichigo, allowing Lurichiyo and Kumoi to escape. Kenryū and Enryū are captured by the second division members, and Ichigo and Rukia escape with Shū's help. The three decide to escape by having Shū pose as a hostage. In response, Yamamoto orders a manhunt for Ichigo and Rukia. When Suì-Fēng voices doubts concerning Kumoi's intentions to Yamamoto, he merely agrees to take them under consideration. Kira voices his suspicions on Kibune's recent actions and relations to the Kasumiōji family to Amagai, who reacts with skepticism, but asks Kira to observe Kibune.
| 182 | 15 | "Amagai's True Strength, the Released Zanpakuto!"; Transliteration: "Amagai no Jitsuryoku, Zanpakutō Kaihō!" (Japanese: 天貝の実力、斬魄刀解放!) | Yasuhito Nishikata Hodaka Kuramoto | Taiji Kawanishi | Genki Yoshimura | July 30, 2008 | December 5, 2010 |
The second and third divisions begin to guard the Kasumiōji compound, and Suì-Fēng returns Kenryū and Enryū to the Kasumiōji clan at Yamamoto's order. Elsewhere, the real Lurichiyo is imprisoned by Kumoi's assassins and visited by Kibune. As Kibune leaves, he is noticed by a drunken third division member, whom Kibune kills. The following morning, sixth division lieutenant Renji Abarai asks his captain, Byakuya Kuchiki, if he is worried that Rukia is being pursued. After Byakuya denies that he is, he gives control of the search party to Renji. Ichigo, Rukia, and Shū decide to rescue Lurichiyo, but are attacked by Amagai, who uses his shikai against Ichigo. Shū stops the battle, revealing the truth of Kumoi's intentions to Amagai, who agrees to help them.
| 183 | 16 | "The Darkness Which Moves! Kibune's True Colors"; Transliteration: "Ugokidashita Yami! Kibune no Shōtai" (Japanese: 動き出した闇！貴船の正体) | Manabu Fukazawa | Takeshi Tomita | Kento Shimoyama | August 6, 2008 | December 12, 2010 |
For helping Ichigo, Amagai is branded a traitor by Yamamoto, who orders him to be hunted as well. Captains Shunsui Kyōraku and Jūshirō Ukitake ask Yamamoto for permission to investigate the Kasumiōji clan, but Yamamoto refuses. Meanwhile, Renji and Ikkaku Madarame begin to fight lieutenants Tetsuzaemon Iba and Shūhei Hisagi respectively over their differences concerning Ichigo and Rukia's actions. Kira enters the Kasumiōji compound and finds Lurichiyo, and is attacked by several assassins. Although he defeats all of them, one of the assassins escapes with Lurichiyo, and Kibune arrives to fight him.
| 184 | 17 | "Kira and Kibune, Offense and Defense of the 3rd Division"; Transliteration: "Kira to Kibune, Sanbantai no Kōbō" (Japanese: 吉良と貴船、三番隊の攻防) | Jun'ya Koshiba | Tomoko Hiramuki | Masahiro Ōkubo | August 20, 2008 | December 19, 2010 |
Despite the patrols of the Thirteen Court Guard Squads, Ichigo, Rukia, Amagai and Shū manage to make contact with the third division members, and head towards the training grounds of the third division, which was Lurichiyo's last known location. Kira begins to fight Kibune, and initially gains the advantage by using his shikai to increase the weight of Kibune's zanpakutō. Kibune uses his bakōtō to negate Kira's shikai, as he continues to fight. Discussing his past, Kibune reveals that he was ostracized in the Thirteen Court Guard Squads for not protecting his weaker division members during missions, and assigned to squad specialized in hunting down hollows as a result. He states that the bakōtō will give him enough power to gain respect from the Thirteen Court Guard Squads.
| 185 | 18 | "Ice and Flame! Fierce Fight of Amagai vs. Hitsugaya"; Transliteration: "Kōri to Honō! Amagai VS Hitsugaya no Gekitō" (Japanese: 氷と炎！天貝VS日番谷の激闘) | Hodaka Kuramoto | Hodaka Kuramoto | Masashi Sogo | August 27, 2008 | January 2, 2011 |
Kira realizes that Kibune is using his bakōtō to negate his shikai, and he manages to exhaust Kibune, enabling him to use his shikai to increase the weight of Kibune's zanpakutō. Kibune attempts to draw on more power from his bakōtō, but is consumed in the process. Kira collapses soon thereafter. Ichigo and Amagai pursue a pair of assassins with Lurichiyo, and discover that the Lurichiyo they are carrying is a fake. They return to the arena, where Kira reveals Kibune's association with Kumoi. Renji arrives and takes Kibune's bakōtō to Yamamoto. Ichigo, Rukia, Amagai, and Shū head to the Kasumiōji compound, which tenth division captain Tōshirō Hitsugaya is guarding. Amagai fights Hitsugaya and Rukia fights Rangiku, as Ichigo and Shū enter the compound. Elsewhere, Yamamoto orders that the Thirteen Court Guard Squads attack the Kasumiōji compound, after seeing the bakōtō brought by Renji.
| 186 | 19 | "Sortie Orders! Suppress the House of Kasumiōji"; Transliteration: "Shutsugeki Shirei! Kasumiōji-ka o Seiatsu seyo" (Japanese: 出撃指令！霞大路家を制圧せよ) | Yasuhito Nishikata | Harume Kosaka | Genki Yoshimura | September 3, 2008 | January 9, 2011 |
Hitsugaya and Rangiku stop fighting after they hear the order to attack the Kasumiōji clan, and the remaining divisions attack the compound. Yamamoto reveals that he suspected the crimes of the Kasumiōji clan, but could not act until Ichigo revealed concrete evidence of their crimes. Kumoi, incensed about the attack, sends all of his assassins against the attacking Soul Reapers. Rukia and Shū find Kumoi, who is using Lurichiyo as a hostage, and reveals that he sought to take control of the nobility of the Soul Society. Amagai arrives, kills Kumoi, and teleports to Yamamoto's location with Lurichiyo.
| 187 | 20 | "Ichigo Rages! The Assassin's Secret"; Transliteration: "Ichigo Gekido! Ansatsusha no Himitsu" (Japanese: 一護激怒！暗殺者の秘密) | Hiroaki Nishimura | Hiroaki Nishimura | Masashi Sogo | September 10, 2008 | January 16, 2011 |
Amagai reveals that he orchestrated the events surrounding the Kasumiōji clan, and desired revenge against Yamamoto for killing his father, Shin'etsu Kisaragi. He further accuses Yamamoto for allowing the Kasumiōji clan to create bakōtō, declaring that he dedicated his life to killing Yamamoto. Yamamoto uses his shikai, but Amagai uses his bakōtō to negate his attack, revealing that it suppresses all powers of the Soul Reapers save his own. Amagai uses his bankai, and Ichigo arrives to fight him.
| 188 | 21 | "Duel! Amagai vs. Ichigo"; Transliteration: "Kettō! Amagai VS Ichigo" (Japanese: 決闘！天貝VS一護) | Jun'ya Koshiba | Yasuhito Nishikata | Kento Shimoyama | September 17, 2008 | January 23, 2011 |
Ichigo begins to fight Amagai, but due to Amagai's bakōtō, he has difficulty in fighting at full strength. Ichigo dons his hollow mask to increase his power, as Amagai's bakōtō cannot negate his hollow powers. Amagai begins to attack Ichigo's mask, and Ichigo manages to hit Amagai with his Getsuga Tenshō. Injured, Amagai declares that he is willing to die for his revenge, and starts to draw more power from his bakōtō.
| 189 | 22 | "The Fallen Shinigami's Pride"; Transliteration: "Ochita Shinigami no Hokori" (Japanese: 堕ちた死神の誇り) | Hodaka Kuramoto Yasuhito Nishikata | Hodaka Kuramoto | Masahiro Ōkubo | October 7, 2008 | January 30, 2011 |
Amagai manages to regain control of himself after overusing his bakōtō, and Ichigo defeats him. Undeterred, Amagai stabs Yamamoto, who is unharmed by the attack. Yoruichi and various captains and lieutenants arrive, revealing to Amagai that Yamamoto ordered Amagai's father, Kisaragi, to investigate the Kasumiōji clan's bakōtō. It is explained that Kumoi used a bakōtō to control Kisaragi, and Yamamoto was forced to kill him. Upon learning this, Amagai forgives Yamamoto and to repent for his deeds, uses his zanpakutō to self-immolate. Before he dies, he apologizes to Kira. Later, Lurichiyo and Shū thank Ichigo for his aid, and Lurichiyo takes her position as the head of the Kasumiōji clan.
