= Bleach season 10 =

Season of television series

Bleach
- Season 10
- The cover of the first DVD compilation released by Aniplex of Arrancar vs. Shinigami arc, featuring Nelliel Tu Odelschwanck
- No. of episodes: 16

Release
- Original network: TV Tokyo
- Original release: October 14, 2008 – February 3, 2009

Season chronology
- ← Previous; Season 9 Next → Season 11

The tenth season of the Bleach anime series, released on DVD as the Arrancar vs. Shinigami arc (破面・VS.死神篇, Arankaru VS. Shinigami Hen), is directed by Noriyuki Abe, and produced by TV Tokyo, Dentsu, and Studio Pierrot. The season adapts Tite Kubo's Bleach manga series from the rest of the 32nd volume to the 35th volume (chapters 286–315), with the exception of episodes 204 and 205 (filler). The season continues with Ichigo Kurosaki and his friends, surviving the battle against the Espadas and assisted by a few Soul Reapers.

The season aired from October 2008 to February 2009 on TV Tokyo. The English adaptation of the anime is licensed by Viz Media, and aired on Cartoon Network's Adult Swim from February to May 2011. Aniplex released the season in a series of DVD compilations, with each of the four volumes containing four episodes. The first DVD volume was released on May 27, 2009, and the fourth one on August 26 of the same year.

The episodes use three pieces of theme music: one opening theme and two closing themes. The opening theme is "Velonica" by Aqua Timez. The first ending theme, "Hitohira no Hanabira" by Stereopony, is used for episode 190 to 201, and the second ending theme, "Sky Chord (Otona ni Naru Kimi e)" (Sky chord 〜大人になる君へ〜, Sukai Kōdo ~Otona ni Naru Kimi e~; lit. 'Sky Chord (To the Adult You)') by Shion Tsuji, is used for the remainder. To promote the third feature film, Bleach: Fade to Black, which was released on December 13, 2008, the credits from episodes 197 through 201 use teaser footage.

== Episodes ==
No. overall	No. in season	Title	Storyboarded by	Directed by	Written by	Original release date	English air date
190	1	"Hueco Mundo Chapter, Restart!"; Transliteration: "Weko Mundo Hen, Saikai!" (Japanese: ウェコムンド編、再会！)	Hiroki Takagi	Hatsuji Kawanishi	Masashi Sogo	October 14, 2008	February 6, 2011
After the fight between Ichigo Kurosaki and Grimmjow Jaegerjaquez concludes when Ichigo breaks through Grimmjow's strongest attack, Grimmjow attempts to continue the fight, but is attacked by Nnoitra Gilga, an Espada. However, Ichigo protects Grimmjow. As Ichigo and Nnoitra begin to fight, Tesla Lindocruz, Nnoitra's subordinate, captures Orihime Inoue. Nnoitra reveals that he is the Fifth Espada and is stronger than Grimmjow. Meanwhile, Renji Abarai, Uryū Ishida, Pesche Guatiche and Dondochakka Bilstin attempt to flee the Espada Szayelaporro Grantz, but because Szayelaporro controls the building they are in, he redirects the hallways to point back towards their battlefield.
191	2	"The Frightening Banquet, Szayelaporro Theater"; Transliteration: "Kyōen, Zaeruaporo Gekijō" (Japanese: 恐宴、ザエルアポロ劇場)	Masami Anno	Mitsutaka Totani	Masahiro Ōkubo	October 21, 2008	February 13, 2011
Nnoitra overpowers the tired Ichigo, and when Orihime attempts to help, Tesla threatens to destroy her hair clips, the source of her power which would allow her to stop Tesla. Szayelaporro releases his zanpakutō and creates clones of Renji, Uryū, Pesche and Dondochakka. Furthermore, he releases the power limiter in the room to allow Renji and Uryū to fight at full power. Meanwhile, Nnoitra encounters Nel and recognizes her. When Ichigo asks how he knows Nel, Nnoitra reveals Nel's true name is Neliel Tu Odelschwanck, indicating that she is a former Espada.
192	3	"Nel's Secret, A Busty Beauty Joins the Battle!?"; Transliteration: "Neru no Himitsu, Kyonyū Bijo Sansen!?" (Japanese: ネルの秘密、 巨乳美女参戦!?)	Kiyomu Fukuda	Rokou Ogiwara	Kento Shimoyama	October 28, 2008	February 20, 2011
Nnoitra uses Nel as a shield against Ichigo, whom he pins to the ground. As he prepares to break Ichigo's arm, the intensity of Nel's emotions causes her to return to her original adult form, Neliel. Pesche and Dondochakka realize that Nel has transformed into her original form, and feel nostalgic. Neliel takes Ichigo away from the battlefield, and as she prepares to fight Nnoitra, she reveals that she was the former Third Espada. She overpowers Nnoitra, and in desperation, Nnoitra uses a cero blast. Neliel uses her Cero Doble technique to absorb Nnoitra's cero and redirect it at him with doubled force. However, Nnoitra is relatively unharmed, and reveals that the Espada have grown stronger in her absence.
193	4	"Irresistible, Puppet Show of Terror"; Transliteration: "Teikō Funō, Kyōfu no Ningyōgeki" (Japanese: 抵抗不能、恐怖の人形劇)	Hiroaki Nishimura	Rokou Ogiwara	Genki Yoshimura	November 4, 2008	February 27, 2011
Uryū and Renji struggle to fight their clones as they copy their attacks. Renji uses his bankai, and the clones copy him, destroying the building. In response, Szayelaporro destroys the clones, and uses another ability of his released form to create voodoo dolls of his opponents. Using the dolls, he causes pain to his targets, and damages their internal organs. Meanwhile, Nnoitra and Neliel fight each other to a stalemate, and Nnoitra states that he despised Neliel even during her time as an Espada.
194	5	"Neliel's Past"; Transliteration: "Nerieru no Kako" (Japanese: ネリエルの過去)	Hotaka Kumoto	Eiko Nishi	Michiko Yokote	November 11, 2008	March 6, 2011
Nnoitra recalls his past encounters with Neliel, in which Neliel sparred with Nnoitra and easily defeated him. In one session, Nnoitra demanded that she continue the fight until one of them died, and Neliel refused. As a result, Nnoitra attacked Neliel's subordinates, Pesche and Dondochakka, and with Szayelaporro's aid, paralyzed Neliel long enough for him to land an attack on her. He left her outside Aizen's palace, where she transformed into an amnesiac child, in which form Pesche and Dondochakka vowed to protect her. In the present, Nnoitra taunts Neliel about their past and Neliel prepares to release her zanpakutō.
195	6	"The Ultimate Union! Pesche's Seriousness"; Transliteration: "Kyūkyoku Gattai! Pesshe no Honki" (Japanese: 究極合体！ペッシェの本気)	Yasuhiro Matsumura	Yasuhiro Matsumura	Rika Nakase	November 18, 2008	March 13, 2011
Neliel finishes her release, transforming into a white centaur, and overwhelms Nnoitra. Meanwhile, Pesche and Dondochakka begin to fight Szayelaporro, and use cero sincrético, a combination attack fusing their cero blasts, to attack Szayelaporro. However, Szayelaporro nullifies the attack, and reveals that he had already analyzed their spiritual energy. When Neliel attempts to finish off Nnoitra, she transforms back into her child form. Ichigo tries to help Nel, and Nnoitra allows Tesla to fight him. After releasing his zanpakutō, Tesla starts to torture the exhausted Ichigo. Before Tesla can deal the final blow, Soul Reaper captain Kenpachi Zaraki stops him.
196	7	"Joining the Battle! The Strongest Shinigami Army Appears"; Transliteration: "Sanzen! Saikyō Shinigami Gundan Tōjō" (Japanese: 参戦！最強死神軍団登場)	Shigenori Kageyama	Fukuda Akira	Kento Shimoyama	November 25, 2008	March 20, 2011
Kenpachi defeats Tesla in one blow and tells Ichigo to stay out of his fight with Nnoitra. He informs Ichigo that Kisuke Urahara was tasked with making the garganta gateways into Hueco Mundo stable enough for Soul Reaper captains to enter, and that three other captains came with him. Captain Retsu Unohana arrives with her lieutenant, Isane Kotetsu, and they stop Rudbornn Chelute and the Exequias from killing Yasutora "Chad" Sado and Gantenbainne Mosqueda. Captain Mayuri Kurotsuchi and his lieutenant, Nemu Kurotsuchi, arrive and Mayuri is confident that he can win against Szayelaporro, even after Szayelaporro creates a voodoo doll of him. Captain Byakuya Kuchiki arrives to save Rukia Kuchiki from Espada Zommari Leroux, and overcomes Zommari's enhanced speed with the techniques Yoruichi Shihōin taught him.
197	8	"Byakuya's Bankai, The Quiet Anger"; Transliteration: "Byakuya Bankai, Shizukanaru Ikari" (Japanese: 白哉卍解、静かなる怒り)	Masami Anno	Taiji Kawanishi	Masahiro Ōkubo	December 2, 2008	March 27, 2011
After realizing that Byakuya refuses to treat him as an equal opponent, Zommari releases his zanpakutō, and grows on his body eyes that can control the objects they are looking at. Zommari takes control of Byakuya's arm and leg, and Byakuya cuts his own tendons to stop them from moving. Meanwhile, Byakuya orders Hanatarō Yamada to take Rukia to safety. Zommari uses one of his eyes to control Rukia, and has her slice Hanatarō with her sword. Before Byakuya can interfere, he threatens to force her to commit suicide. Byakuya immobilizes Rukia with kidō, and uses his bankai. Surrounded by thousands of tiny blades, Zommari is overwhelmed by the attack.
198	9	"The Two Scientists, Mayuri's Trap"; Transliteration: "Futari no Kagakusha, Mayuri no Wana" (Japanese: 2人の科学者、マユリの罠)	Yasuhito Nishikata	Mitsutaka Totani	Genki Yoshimura	December 9, 2008	April 3, 2011
Zommari survives Byakuya's attack, but Byakuya uses kidō to block Zommari's control ability, and quickly dispatches him. Mayuri initially seems unable to fight back against Szayelaporro, who uses his voodoo doll ability to destroy all of Mayuri's organs. However, he reveals that he has made himself immune to Szayelaporro's attack by replacing the organs in his body with dummies, after learning about the ability from bacteria he implanted in Uryū to use the voodoo doll. He then activates his bankai, which poisons Szayelaporro, and subsequently swallows him.
199	10	"Holy Birth, The Resurrected Szayelaporro"; Transliteration: "Seitan, Yomigaeru Zaeruaporo" (Japanese: 聖誕、蘇るザエルアポロ)	Hotaka Kumoto	Rokou Ogiwara	Masashi Sogo	December 16, 2008	April 10, 2011
Rukia regains consciousness, and Byakuya tells her to rest and regain her strength for the impending battles. Kenpachi battles Nnoitra, and Orihime heals Nel at Ichigo's request. While swallowing Szayelaporro with his bankai, Mayuri inadvertently poisons Uryū and Renji, and Szayelaporro seizes the opportunity to resurrect himself by absorbing Nemu's spiritual particles through his Gabriel technique. However, in the process, he ingests a "superhuman" drug from inside Nemu that increases all of his senses to the point where his body cannot respond to the flood of sensory information, immobilizing him with Mayuri stating that one second would feel like a century. He then stabs Szayelaporro through the hand before stabbing him in the heart.
200	11	"The Hardest Body!? Cut Down Nnoitra"; Transliteration: "Saikō no Karada!? Noitora o Kire" (Japanese: 最硬の体!? ノイトラを斬れ)	Hiroaki Nishimura	Hiroaki Nishimura	Michiko Yokote	December 23, 2008	April 17, 2011
Szayelaporro, whose senses are heightened by the drug, feels Mayuri's zanpakutō piercing through his hand and heart for what he feels as centuries before he dies. After restoring Nemu to full health, Mayuri orders her to clear away the rubble that concealed Szayelaporro's laboratory. Afterwards, Mayuri heals Uryū's injuries. Meanwhile, Kenpachi has difficulty cutting through Nnoitra's skin, which Nnoitra claims is the toughest of any of the Espada, but believes that Nnoitra can be injured. Kenpachi stabs Nnoitra through his eyepatch, but Nnoitra counterattacks, injuring Kenpachi. He then reveals that Kenpachi had stabbed him through his hollow hole, which is where his left eye should have been.
201	12	"Nnoitra Released! Multiplying Arms"; Transliteration: "Noitora Kaihō! Zōshokushita Ude" (Japanese: ノイトラ開放！増殖した腕)	Hitoyuki Matsui	Eiko Nishi	Rika Nakase	January 6, 2009	April 24, 2011
Kenpachi slashes at Nnoitra, wounding him, and uses the correct amount of force he needed to cut Nnoitra's skin. He continues to attack Nnoitra, and after Nnoitra accidentally tears off Kenpachi's eyepatch while trying to attack him, the limits on his power are removed. Kenpachi delivers a slash through Nnoitra's torso. Nnoitra releases his zanpakutō, and gains an additional pair of arms. Nnoitra attacks Kenpachi and severely wounds him, while Kenpachi manages to cut off one of his arms. Nnoitra regenerates the arm and continues on the assault, growing another pair of arms and stabbing Kenpachi with one of his hands.
202	13	"Fierce Fighting Conclusion! Who's the Strongest?"; Transliteration: "Gekitō Ketchaku! Saikyō wa Dare da" (Japanese: 激闘決着！最強は誰だ)	Yasuhiro Matsumura Yasuhito Nishikata	Yasuhiro Matsumura	Rika Nakase	January 13, 2009	May 1, 2011
Kenpachi continues fighting Nnoitra, and although he is able to keep up with his attacks, he realizes that he is in danger of dying. He then resorts to using kendo, and severely injures Nnoitra with a two-handed strike. Kenpachi attempts to leave, but Nnoitra insists that he finish their battle. Nnoitra recalls his time with Neliel, in which Neliel frequently saved him from his attempts to die in battle, and claims that he is angered by any display of pity from his opponent. He charges Kenpachi, who inflicts the finishing blow.
203	14	"Karakura Town Gathers! Aizen Versus Shinigami"; Transliteration: "Karakura-chō ni Shūketsu! Aizen Tai Shinigami" (Japanese: 空座町に集結！藍染対死神)	Masami Anno	Akane Inoue	Genki Yoshimura	January 20, 2009	May 8, 2011
After Kenpachi defeats Nnoitra, the Espadas Coyote Stark and Lilinette Gingerbuck arrive and carry Orihime away to a tower, where Sousuke Aizen greets her. He informs her that he, Gin Ichimaru and Kaname Tōsen are preparing to destroy Karakura Town. Aizen orders Tōsen to contact the Soul Reaper captains, Ichigo, and his friends with kidō, and reveals that he brought Orihime to Hueco Mundo to lure and trap them. While he travels through a garganta portal to Karakura Town, however, first division captain Genryūsai Shigekuni Yamamoto, the leader of the Thirteen Court Guard Squads confronts Aizen, with five other captains. Aizen summons the Espadas Stark and Lilinette, Baraggan Louisenbairn, and Tier Halibel and orders Espada Ulquiorra Schiffer to protect Las Noches. Ichigo, sensing the threat to Orihime, flies off to save her.
204	15	"Ichigo's Seppuku Persuasion Strategy ☆"; Transliteration: "Ichigo no Seppuku Settoku Sakusen" (Japanese: 一護の切腹説得大作戦☆)	Junya Koshiba	Taiji Kawanishi	Kento Shimoyama	January 27, 2009	May 15, 2011
In the real world, Ichigo is in school when he see Lurichiyo Kasumiōji, who has come back to the real world because she is angered that Ryūsei "Kenryū" Kenzaki, her retainer, would not allow her to play kemari when she has other important duties. This leads to an outburst between Lurichiyo and Kenryū, and Kenryū intends to kill himself to make Lurichiyo "happy". After Ichigo and his friends persuade Kenryū, they put on an act to fool Lurichiyo into forgiving him, but she sees through the trick. This leads to another argument and culminates in Lurichiyo challenging Kenryū to a kemari game to see who is right.
205	16	"Thump! A Kemari Tournament Filled with Hollows"; Transliteration: "Doki! Horō Darake no Kemari Taikai" (Japanese: ドキ！虚だらけの蹴鞠大会)	Hotaka Kumoto	Mitsutaka Totani	Masahiro Ōkubo	February 3, 2009	May 22, 2011
The kemari game officially starts. The referees are the proprietors from the Urahara Shop, Jinta Hanakari and Ururu Tsumugiya. Kisuke Urahara himself oversees the proceedings, and set up a gigantic barrier around the play field to indicate the assigned area. The two teams, each with varying characters attempt to keep the ball away from each other in different, comical ways. Ikkaku Madarame joins in the game, while sparring with Ichigo under the impression that he was undergoing intensive training. Then a hollow appears on the field, drawn by everyone's spiritual pressure. With the help of Ichigo, Uryū and Chad, the hollow is quickly dispatched, but the game ends because Lurichiyo's team dropped the ball. Before she can lament about going back to her world, Shū Kannogi enters the human world and shows Lurichiyo that her idea about a kemari tournament in the Soul Society was not such a bad idea in the eyes of the commoners after all. Satisfied at this, Lurichiyo returns to the Soul Society.
