= Bleach season 13 =

Season of television series

Bleach
- Season 13
- Cover of the first DVD compilation released by Aniplex of the Zanpakutō: The Alternate Tale arc, featuring Ichigo Kurosaki
- No. of episodes: 36

Release
- Original network: TV Tokyo
- Original release: July 28, 2009 – April 6, 2010

Season chronology
- ← Previous; Season 12 Next → Season 14

The thirteenth season of the Bleach anime television series is based on Tite Kubo's Bleach manga series. It is known as the Zanpakutō: The Alternate Tale arc (斬魄刀異聞篇, Zanpakutō Ibun-hen), is directed by Noriyuki Abe and produced by TV Tokyo, Dentsu, and Studio Pierrot. The anime original season focuses on an alternative set of events in which the Soul Reaper's swords zanpakutō spirits, assume human forms and rebel against their wielders led by Muramasa, a manipulative man and former zanpakutō abandoned by his owner.

The season aired from July 28, 2009, to April 6, 2010. Aniplex released the season in a series of nine DVD volumes, each containing the first four episodes, from May 26, 2010, to January 26, 2011. The English adaptation of the Bleach anime is licensed by Viz Media. The season began airing on Cartoon Network's Adult Swim on November 13, 2011, in the United States, eventually joining the lineup of the newly relaunched Toonami programming block on the same network and continuing to air from May 27 to August 5, 2012.

The season uses five pieces of theme music; two openings and three endings. The first opening theme song, "Shōjo S" (少女S) performed by Scandal, and the first ending theme song, "Mad Surfer" performed by Kenichi Asai, are used from episode 230 to 242. The second opening theme song, "Anima Rossa" (アニマロッサ) performed by Porno Graffitti, and the second ending theme song, "Sakurabito" (さくらびと; lit. 'Cherry Blossom Person') performed by SunSet Swish, are used from episode 243 to 255. The third ending theme song, "Tabidatsu Kimi e" (旅立つキミへ; lit. 'Leaving You') performed by RSP, is used from episode 256 to 265.

== Episodes ==
No. overall	No. in season	Title	Directed by (Note: Production staff information is taken from the ending credits of each episode.)	Written by	Storyboarded by	Original release date	English air date
230	1	"A New Enemy! The Materialization of Zanpakutō"; Transliteration: "Aratanaru Teki! Zanpakutō Jittaika" (Japanese: 新たなる敵！斬魄刀実体化)	Noriyuki Abe	Masahiro Okubo	Noriyuki Abe	July 28, 2009	November 13, 2011
A mysterious man informs a group of strange beings that it is the time to strike. In his dimension, Zangetsu wakes Ichigo Kurosaki up and asks him if he can hear anything, but the latter thinks it is okay that he cannot. In the Seireitei, the captains and lieutenants of the Thirteen Court Guard Squads are confused as to why their zanpakutō are not working right, making them feel detached. At night, a group of ryoka attempt to enter Shigekuni Yamamoto-Genryūsai's quarters. Yamamoto and his lieutenant Chōjirō Sasakibe confront the intruders, but what they see leaves them in shock. Later, Yamamoto calls all captains and lieutenants to Sōkyoku Hill. There they are met by the mysterious man, who calls himself Muramasa. Sajin Komamura tries to attack him with his zanpakutō, Tenken, but it appears in a human form and turns on him, ending the battle by knocking him unconscious with one swing of the blade. The other Soul Reapers attempt to release their zanpakutō to attack, but are somehow unable to do so. The zanpakutō assume human-like forms and join Muramasa, who states that the Soul Reapers' zanpakutō have renounced them and have declared war.
231	2	"Byakuya, Disappearing with the Cherry Blossoms"; Transliteration: "Byakuya, Sakura to Tomo ni Kiyu" (Japanese: 白哉、桜と共に消ゆ)	Takeshi Yamaguchi	Masahiro Okubo	Hideki Tachibana	August 4, 2009	November 20, 2011
Ichigo finds Rukia Kuchiki injured in the world of the living, whilst a strange woman, who uses Rukia's abilities, is attacking her. It is revealed that this woman is in fact Rukia's zanpakutō, Sode no Shirayuki. Ichigo successfully forces the renegade zanpakutō into submission, and Sode no Shirayuki retreats back to the Soul Society. Ichigo brings Rukia to Kisuke Urahara's shop, where she reveals that the Soul Reapers' zanpakutō have attacked their masters and that her brother Byakuya Kuchiki was seemingly defeated by his own zanpakutō, Senbonzakura. Yoruichi Shihōin returns from investigating the Soul Society and reveals that everyone who met with Muramasa has survived. The remaining Soul Reapers of the Thirteen Court Guard Squads have regrouped to the fourth division headquarters while they try to reestablish their defenses and learn more about the zanpakutō rebellion. Urahara observes that only the zanpakutō in the Soul Society are affected and that those in the real world are unaffected, and decides to try to capture one of the materialized zanpakutō in an attempt to learn more about their new enemy. In the middle of the night, Rukia leaves for the Soul Society, apparently in search of Byakuya. Ichigo and Yoruichi leave in an attempt to go after Rukia and to save the Soul Society.
232	3	"Sode no Shirayuki vs. Rukia! Confused Heart"; Transliteration: "Sode no Shirayuki tai Rukia! Kokoro no Madoi" (Japanese: 袖白雪vsルキア！心の惑い)	Eiko Nishi	Genki Yoshimura	Tetsuhito Saito	August 11, 2009	November 27, 2011
Rukia rushes back to the sixth division headquarters and reunites with Renji Abarai. However, Byakuya's status remains unknown after the night of the rebellion. Ichigo and Yoruichi arrive in the Soul Society and split up to search for clues. Rukia returns to Byakuya's compound, only to find Sode no Shirayuki there. Rukia tries to reason with her zanpakutō, but Sode no Shirayuki demands her freedom. After a fierce battle, Rukia loses to Sode no Shirayuki, but Ichigo arrives to rescue her from being frozen to death. However, due to his reluctance to harm Rukia's zanpakutō, he too is defeated by Sode no Shirayuki. Rukia attempts to get Sode no Shirayuki back to her by telling the zanpakutō how important she is to her. Using her kidō powers, she constrains herself with Sode no Shirayuki as an attempt to convince Sode no Shirayuki that one could not live without the other. However, the resulting explosion injures Rukia severely. Sode no Shirayuki has a change of heart and attempts to reach out to her mistress, but Muramasa arrives and holds her back. Muramasa introduces himself to Ichigo and states that he is a zanpakutō.
233	4	"Zangetsu Becomes an Enemy"; Transliteration: "Teki to Natta Zangetsu" (Japanese: 敵となった斬月)	Junya Koshiba	Masahiro Okubo	Junya Koshiba	August 18, 2009	December 4, 2011
Muramasa sends Sode no Shirayuki away, and Ichigo asks why he wanted the zanpakutō to gain independence over the Soul Reapers. Although he does not give the reason, Muramasa replies that zanpakutō can separate themselves away regardless of being the soul of a Soul Reaper, and he is a good example of one. Ichigo cannot accept this view and attacks him. Muramasa uses illusions to overwhelm Ichigo and pins him to the ground, where he proceeds to drag Zangetsu out of him. Once Zangetsu manifests, he immediately attacks Ichigo. Meanwhile, Mayuri Kurotsuchi begins experimenting on himself in order to research the manifestation of the zanpakutō. After Ichigo is seemingly defeated by Zangetsu, Ichigo transforms into his inner hollow form and strikes back, putting Zangetsu on the defensive. Muramasa tries a sneak attack but the inner hollow immediately regenerates and attacks him. Before his inner hollow can do anything else, Ichigo manages to regain control of his body, falling unconscious at Muramasa's feet.
234	5	"Renji Surprised?! The Two Zabimarus"; Transliteration: "Renji Kyōgaku!? Futari no Zabimaru" (Japanese: 恋次驚愕!? 2人の蛇尾丸)	Rokō Ogiwara	Kento Shimoyama	Hiroki Takagi	August 25, 2009	December 11, 2011
Rukia is found by the fourth division and sent to recover from her injuries. While Shūhei Hisagi patrols the Seireitei, he is attacked by his sadistic zanpakutō, Kazeshini. Renji searches the ruins for any clues of Byakuya, who is still missing. He instead encounters Zabimaru in the form of a monkey woman named Saru and a snake boy named Hebi. Both entities of Zabimaru have no intention of returning to their original owner and attack Renji. According to Zabimaru, all zanpakutō have heard a voice telling them to follow their instincts to attack their masters. Ichigo wakes up in Zangetsu's dimension, but the old man is missing. He sees Muramasa and attacks him, but the man immediately incapacitates him and summons his inner hollow. Muramasa has begun to take an interest in the inner hollow and uses his powers to freeze it in place. Thinking that it has been subdued, Muramasa approaches it, but the inner hollow merely tricks him with its act and lashes out straight at him.
235	6	"Clash! Hisagi vs. Kazeshini"; Transliteration: "Gekitotsu! Hisagi tai Kazeshini" (Japanese: 激突！檜佐木vs風死)	Hodaka Kuramoto	Kento Shimoyama	Hodaka Kuramoto	September 1, 2009	December 18, 2011
Jūshirō Ukitake and Shunsui Kyōraku discuss the possibility that defeating the zanpakutō spirits will destroy the zanpakutō themselves. Renji continues fighting with Zabimaru, who taunts him for his weakness. Hisagi fights with Kazeshini, and, disgusted by his desire to take life, plans on killing him even if he loses his zanpakutō. Ichigo's inner hollow fights with Muramasa inside his mind until Muramasa uses his powers to restrain him, which then allows Ichigo sees through Muramasa's powers and saves his inner hollow. Ichigo then steps up to fight, stating that the inner hollow is a part of him as well. Ichigo manages to force Muramasa outside of his mind and continues the fight with him there. When Zabimaru threatens to kill Rukia, Renji remembers Ichigo's reason for fighting and then his own, which in turn enables him to regain his resolve, managing to activate Zabimaru's shikai.
236	7	"Release! The New Getsuga Tenshō"; Transliteration: "Hanate! Aratanaru Getsuga Tenshō" (Japanese: 放て！新たなる月牙天衝)	Kazunori Mizuno	Kento Shimoyama	Hideki Tachibana	September 8, 2009	January 8, 2012
Kazeshini wounds Hisagi in a surprise attack, but Izuru Kira intervenes to help him, using kidō to bind Kazeshini long enough for the two of them to escape. Renji's fight with Zabimaru continues, and Zabimaru takes the advantage when they are able to activate bankai while Renji, no longer able to control them, cannot. Renji considers his own weaknesses, and tricks Zabimaru into taking his sword, then breaks it with a kidō spell and then he defeats Zabimaru by firing the broken shards at them. Ichigo fights Zangetsu, struggling when Zangetsu activates bankai. He uses Getsuga Tenshō, working together with his inner hollow to defeat Zangetsu, and forces Muramasa to retreat. Zangetsu reveals that Muramasa is using a technique to awaken the instincts of the zanpakutō, and by doing so, he can control them.
237	8	"Suì-Fēng, Surrounding the Zanpakutō!"; Transliteration: "Soi-Fon, Zanpakutō o Hōi se yo!" (Japanese: 砕蜂、斬魄刀を包囲せよ！)	Hiroaki Nishimura	Masahiro Okubo	Hiroaki Nishimura	September 15, 2009	January 15, 2012
Ichigo reports his findings of Muramasa's abilities to Ukitake, Kyōraku and Retsu Unohana. In order to find out about Muramasa's effects on zanpakutō, Ichigo and Ikkaku Madarame patrol the Seireitei to seek out the entities. Meanwhile, someone breaks into a compound and knocks out the Soul Reapers guarding the area. Marechiyo Ōmaeda stumbles on the unconscious guards and investigate, only to encounter his zanpakutō spirit, Gegetsuburi, and Ikkaku's zanpakutō spirit, Hōzukimaru. Ōmaeda and Gegetsuburi are just about to fight when Ichigo and Ikkaku interrupt. Ōmaeda is knocked out of the fight, leaving Ichigo to battle Gegetsuburi, while Ikkaku fights Hōzukimaru. Ichigo defeats Gegetsuburi but Ikkaku is wounded by Hōzukimaru's bankai. Just as he attempts to continue the battle, Ukitake, Kyōraku and Suì-Fēng arrive to surround Hōzukimaru, but he uses his bankai to get away. However, they manage to obtain Gegetsuburi. Ichigo goes after Hōzukimaru, but the entity escapes when Senbonzakura's petals block Ichigo's route. Ichigo discovers that the attack was from Byakuya, who disappears.
238	9	"Friendship? Hatred? Haineko & Tobiume"; Transliteration: "Yūjō? Ken'o? Haineko to Tobiume" (Japanese: 友情？嫌悪？灰猫&飛梅)	Yasuhiro Matsumura	Genki Yoshimura	Hodaka Kuramoto	September 22, 2009	January 22, 2012
Ichigo continues searching for Byakuya and encounters the zanpakutō spirits of Haineko and Tobiume, who are looking for Hyōrinmaru. Rangiku Matsumoto and Momo Hinamori arrive to fight their respective zanpakutō spirits while Ichigo continues the search. Momo uses a kidō spell to knock Tobiume into Haineko, causing the two to begin arguing. Ichigo encounters Hyōrinmaru, who cannot remember his name or his master. He attempts to freeze Ichigo and leave, but Tōshirō Hitsugaya confronts him. Elsewhere, Muramasa encounters and kills a large group of Gillians.
239	10	"The Awakening Hyōrinmaru! Hitsugaya's Fierce Fight"; Transliteration: "Mezame yo Hyōrinmaru! Hitsugaya Gekitō" (Japanese: 目覚めよ氷輪丸！日番谷激闘)	Tomoko Hiramuki	Genki Yoshimura	Tetsuhito Saito	September 29, 2009	January 29, 2012
Ichigo is still trapped in the ice prison Hyōrinmaru trapped him in as Hitsugaya and Hyōrinmaru confront each other. Meanwhile, Rangiku and Momo fight their zanpakutō in the woods and finally manage to overpower them with kidō spells. As Hitsugaya and Hyōrinmaru begin to fight, Hitsugaya tries to seal him but is shocked as Hyōrinmaru effortlessly dissolves the seal into fragments of ice. As their fight continues, Hyōrinmaru's tremendous power turns the whole sky black. Hitsugaya began to recall his past during his first encounter with Hyōrinmaru to convince him. Hitsugaya managed to activate Hyōrinmaru's shikai, thus managed to convince Hyōrinmaru that Hitsugaya is his master. Despite freezing himself along with his zanpakutō and losing consciousness, Hitsugaya manages to convince Hyōrinmaru of his identity.
240	11	"Byakuya's Betrayal"; Transliteration: "Uragiri no Byakuya" (Japanese: 裏切りの白哉)	Eiko Nishi	Kento Shimoyama	Hodaka Kuramoto	October 6, 2009	February 12, 2012
Mayuri experiments on Gegetsuburi and discovers that the zanpakutō can only return to their owners' control once they are defeated by their owners. Rangiku and Momo send their zanpakutō back to the fourth division barracks, but an unknown assailant attacks the cart carrying them. Ichigo meets with Rangiku and Momo, and then reaches Muramasa, who is having difficulties using his abilities in his current body. Ichigo attempts to attack Muramasa but is stopped by Senbonzakura. Ichigo fights Senbonzakura and gains the upper hand before Byakuya arrives. Byakuya reveals that he has joined Muramasa as part of following his internal desire to protect his pride, and then disappears with Muramasa and Senbonzakura.
241	12	"For the Sake of Pride! Byakuya vs. Renji"; Transliteration: "Hokori no Tame ni! Byakuya tai Renji" (Japanese: 誇りのために！白哉vs恋次)	Yasuto Nishikata	Masahiro Okubo	Yasuto Nishikata	October 13, 2009	February 19, 2012
Ukitake, Kyōraku, Renji and Unohana discuss Byakuya's betrayal, discovering that a zanpakutō will be unusable if killed by anyone other than its owner. Byakuya returns to the hideout of the zanpakutō and proves his loyalty by defeating and seemingly killing Sode no Shirayuki, leaving Rukia unable to use her zanpakutō. Rukia and Renji investigate Byakuya's office, but Byakuya arrives with Senbonzakura, tossing Rukia the broken remains of her zanpakutō. Zabimaru arrives to help Renji fight Byakuya and Senbonzakura, but they are overpowered. Tenken, Houzukimaru, Kazeshini, Ruri'iro Kujaku and Gonryomaru suddenly arrive. The second division surrounds the zanpakutō, and their owners come out to fight them.
242	13	"Shinigami and Zanpakutō, Total Sortie"; Transliteration: "Shinigami to Zanpakutō, Sōshutsugeki" (Japanese: 死神&斬魄刀、総出撃)	Rokō Ogiwara	Masahiro Okubo	Junya Koshiba	October 20, 2009	February 26, 2012
As Ichigo goes to confront Byakuya, he is intercepted by Senbonzakura, and they fight each other using their bankai. Renji and Zabimaru move to prevent Byakuya from leaving. Kira begins fighting Kazeshini, suspecting that its personality is based on Hisagi's suppressed negative impulses. Suì-Fēng fights Gonryomaru and Tenken at once, but she is surprised by a smoke attack. Yumichika faces Ruri'iro Kujaku, and the two exchange insults. While Ikkaku fights Houzukimaru, Ikkaki is able to break Houzukimaru's bankai unleashed by repeatedly attacking it, managing to withstand its final attack and claiming victory. Fourth division lieutenant Isane Kotetsu and seventh division lieutenant Tetsuzaemon Iba go to assist the wounded at the scene of the battle when Ashisogi Jizō appears.
243	14	"One-to-One Fight! Ichigo vs. Senbonzakura"; Transliteration: "Ikkiuchi! Ichigo tai Senbonzakura" (Japanese: 一騎打ち！一護vs千本桜)	Kazunori Mizuno	Masahiro Okubo	Kazunori Mizuno	October 27, 2009	March 4, 2012
Suì-Fēng continue her fight with Gonryomaru and Tenken, but then her zanpakutō, Suzumebachi, appears and attacks her. Ruri'iro Kujaku gains the advantage over Yumichika and begins to use his special ability on Yumichika. Isane and Iba attempt to retreat from Ashisogi Jizō, but Haineko and Tobiume arrive and Ashisogi Jizō paralyzes Isane's legs. Rangiku and Momo then return to help them against their opponents. Byakuya manages to defeat Renji and Zabimaru. Kira manages to capture Kazeshini by tricking him into thinking he could still use his zanpakutō in order to unsettle Kazeshini, but he is soon attacked by his own zanpakutō, Wabisuke. When Ichigo sees this, he desperately fights his way past Senbonzakura to get to Kira, but that is until Kenpachi Zaraki arrives.
244	15	"The Long Awaited...Kenpachi Appears!"; Transliteration: "Man o Moshite...Kenpachi Tōjō!" (Japanese: 満を持して…剣八登場！)	Hodaka Kuramoto	Kento Shimoyama	Hodaka Kuramoto	November 3, 2009	March 11, 2012
Kenpachi appears just before Wabisuke is about to finish off Kira. Wabisuke turns to strike Kenpachi, but Kenpachi easily kills Wabisuke off, leaving Kira unable to use his zanpakutō anymore. Yachiru Kusajishi appears as well and tells everyone that she and Kenpachi were off hunting hollows and somehow got lost on the way back, providing an explanation for their disappearance throughout the crisis. Senbonzakura takes on Kenpachi but is overwhelmed by the latter's enormous spiritual power, which destroys a wide radius around them. Byakuya intervenes and fights Kenpachi while Senbonzakura resumes his fight with Ichigo. Yumichika breaks out of Ruri'iro Kujaku's binding vines and defeats him, reclaiming his zanpakutō.
245	16	"Pursue Byakuya! The Confused Gotei Divisions"; Transliteration: "Byakuya o Oe! Konran no Goteitai" (Japanese: 白哉を追え！混乱の護廷隊)	Hiroaki Nishimura	Masahiro Okubo	Hiroaki Nishimura	November 10, 2009	March 18, 2012
Ichigo continues fighting Senbonzakura while Kenpachi fights Byakuya, but Ashisogi Jizō appears and uses its bankai, spraying poison gas over the battlefield, enabling Senbonzakura and Byakuya to escape. Ashisogi Jizō is chased by Yachiru and later gets captured by Kenpachi. Mayuri blows up Ashisogi Jizō, revealed to be his zanpakutō, causing it to return to its sealed form and break into pieces. Suì-Fēng has difficulty hitting the small Suzumebachi, but manages to defeat her, to which Yoruichi arrives to congratulates her. Unohana comes to treat the victims of Ashisogi Jizō's poisoning, including Rangiku, Momo, Isane and Iba. Yoruichi meets with Ichigo and the captains present, revealing that she knows Yamamoto's location. Yamamoto is then shown as a prisoner of the zanpakutō, with Sōgyo no Kotowari, Katen Kyōkotsu and Minazuki, recognized as the group of ryoka from before, encasing him in a barrier.
246	17	"Special Mission! Rescue Captain Commander Yamamoto!"; Transliteration: "Tokumu! Yamamoto Sōtaichō o Kyūshutsu se yo!" (Japanese: 特務！山本総隊長を救出せよ！)	Yasuhiro Matsumura	Genki Yoshimura	Hiroki Takagi	November 17, 2009	March 25, 2012
Yoruichi discusses with Ukitake, Kyōraku and Kenpachi on how they are going to rescue Yamamoto, knowing that they will be running into high-class zanpakutō. Meanwhile, Kazeshini comes back to the hideout and faints from exhaustion. Ukitake, Kyōraku and Kenpachi head into the cave in one direction, and Yoruichi and Ichigo head in another way. Kyōraku and Ukitake meet their materialized zanpakutō, Sōgyo no Kotowari and Katen Kyōkotsu, while Kenpachi and Yachiru, who get lost in the cave, come across Gonryomaru and Tenken. In the meantime, Ichigo and Yoruichi encounter Haineko and Tobiume, who both are defeated by Yoruichi. Ichigo heads on and is led to Kazeshini by Minazuki. Ichigo defeats Kazeshini, causing the latter to break into pieces, and Ichigo moves on to find Yamamoto.
247	18	"Deceived Shinigami! The World Collapse Crisis"; Transliteration: "Damasareta Shinigami! Sekai Hōkai no Kiki" (Japanese: 騙された死神！世界崩壊の危機)	Yuzuru Mitsui	Kento Shimoyama	Yuzuru Mitsui	November 24, 2009	April 1, 2012
Muramasa stands in Ichigo's way of rescuing Yamamoto and goads him into releasing his hollow powers against him. Meanwhile, Yoruichi, Ukitake and Kyōraku realize that something is amiss and break away from their opponents. Having used the zanpakutō entities to distract Ichigo's companions, Muramasa tricks Ichigo into firing his most powerful Getsuga Tenshō at him, but deflects the attack into Yamamoto's barrier, shattering it just as Yoruichi, Ukitake and Kyōraku arrive to prevent this from happening. Muramasa reveals that Yamamoto encased himself in the barrier to prevent him from stealing Ryūjin Jakka, but with Ichigo's hollow-based attack, it would allow Muramasa to easily obtain Yamamoto's zanpakutō entity. When Muramasa says that he has no need for the other entities anymore, Katen Kyōkotsu and Sōgyo no Kotowari attack him but end up having their physical forms destroyed by Ryūjin Jakka. Muramasa makes his escape with Ryūjin Jakka, while Yamamoto reveals to the others that Muramasa intends to destroy the Thirteen Court Guard Squads with Ryūjin Jakka.
248	19	"Dragon of Ice and Dragon of Flame! The Strongest Showdown!"; Transliteration: "Kōri no Ryū to Honoo no Ryū! Saikyō Taiketsu!" (Japanese: 氷の龍と炎の龍！最強対決！)	Eiko Nishi	Masahiro Okubo	Yasuto Nishikata	December 1, 2009	April 8, 2012
Ichigo, Yoruichi, Ukitake, Kyōraku and Yamamoto are surrounded by a wall of flames created by Ryūjin Jakka. Yoruichi escapes underground through a fissure that she opens using her shunkō technique, but Tobiume and Haineko use their fireball and sand attacks to cave it in behind Yoruichi, preventing the others from following. Ichigo attempts to escape by jumping over the wall of flames but is unsuccessful even with his hollow powers. Yamamoto reveals that Muramasa's plan is to destroy Karakura Town in order to free his owner, Kōga Kuchiki, who has been sealed there. Upon arriving at Karakura Town, Muramasa stumbles upon Orihime Inoue and blacks out. After waking up from recovery and asking Orihime who she is, Uryū Ishida and Yasutora "Chad" Sado arrive to take out Muramasa. Ichigo makes a final attempt at jumping over the wall of flames, and just before he is defeated and completely enveloped in fire, Hitsugaya and Hyōrinmaru arrive to save him. Hitsugaya and Hyōrinmaru both activate their bankai to help get Ichigo out of the flames so that he can head to Karakura Town to stop Muramasa.
249	20	"Senbonzakura's Bankai! Offense and Defense of the Living World"; Transliteration: "Senbonzakura Bankai! Gensei no Kōbō" (Japanese: 千本桜卍解！現世の攻防)	Junya Koshiba	Masahiro Okubo	Junya Koshiba	December 8, 2009	April 15, 2012
Kenpachi continues his fight against Tenken. Yoruichi outmaneuvers Haineko and Tobiume while trying to convince them that Muramasa betrayed them. Yamamoto, Ukitake, Kyōraku, Hitsugaya and Hyōrinmaru plan to defeat Ryūjin Jakka together. Uryū and Chad arrive to fight Muramasa, but he evades all their attacks and Senbonzakura arrives to help him. Muramasa tries to use his ability on Chad and incapacitates him, due to him not being a Soul Reaper. Orihime asks Muramasa about his motive, and Muramasa reveals that he wishes to be free of solitude. Rukia arrives as Muramasa tries to escape to unseal Kōga. Uryū continues to fight Senbonzakura, managing to hit him with Seele Schneider, but he is still able to keep fighting. Muramasa manages to unseal Kōga as Ichigo arrives to face him.
250	21	"That Man, for the Sake of the Kuchiki..."; Transliteration: "Sono Otoko・Kuchiki-ke Yue ni..." (Japanese: その男・朽木家ゆえに…)	Rokō Ogiwara	Kento Shimoyama	Tetsuhito Saito	December 15, 2009	April 22, 2012
In a flashback several centuries ago, it is revealed that Kōga was part of the Kuchiki clan as the son-in-law of Ginrei Kuchiki and was overconfident in the abilities of his zanpakutō. He helped put down a rebellion of Soul Reapers, but some grew suspicious of his power and had him attacked. He cut down his attackers, but he was framed for killing his own allies by a group of jealous high-ranking Soul Reapers. He was imprisoned as a result, but he escaped with Muramasa's help. In the present, Kōga awakens, repelling Ichigo and Rukia, then suddenly stabs Muramasa.
251	22	"Dark History! The Worst Shinigami Is Born"; Transliteration: "Yami no Rekishi! Saikyō no Shinigami, Tanjō" (Japanese: 闇の歴史！最凶の死神、誕生)	Hodaka Kuramoto	Genki Yoshimura	Hodaka Kuramoto	December 22, 2009	April 29, 2012
The flashback continues and reveals that Kōga killed the people who had framed him, but after Ginrei confronted him, he went insane and began killing anyone he perceived as an enemy. Muramasa tried to reach out to Kōga but eventually was no longer able to hear his voice. Kōga was finally defeated and sealed away by Ginrei and Yamamoto when Kōga's call for Muramasa went unheard. In the present, Muramasa asks why Kōga stabbed him, as he had worked hard to bring about his return, but Kōga responds that zanpakutō are tools that obey their masters' commands. He tries to finish off Muramasa, but Byakuya steps in, saying that he is no longer worthy to be called a Soul Reaper.
252	23	"Byakuya, the Truth Behind His Betrayal"; Transliteration: "Byakuya, Uragiri ni Kakusareta Shinjitsu" (Japanese: 白哉、裏切りに隠された真実)	Yasuto Nishikata	Masahiro Okubo	Yasuto Nishikata	January 5, 2010	May 6, 2012
Senbonzakura reveals that Byakuya had sworn to kill Kōga and had been searching for how to unseal him, even if that meant risking his status as a Soul Reaper. Muramasa offers Kōga his power, but Kōga breaks Muramasa, stating that he does not need help. Byakuya and Kōga fight, but Kōga gains the upper hand when he distorts Byakuya's senses. Senbonzakura helps dispel the effect though, and Byakuya manages to use bankai on Kōga. As Byakuya notes that Kōga's failing was refusing to trust his zanpakutō or anyone else, the two charge at each other.
253	24	"Cero?! Muramasa's True Identity Revealed"; Transliteration: "Sero!? Akasareta Muramasa no Shōtai" (Japanese: 虚閃(セロ)!? 明かされた村正の正体)	Hiroaki Nishimura	Masahiro Okubo	Hiroaki Nishimura	January 12, 2010	May 13, 2012
After Kōga's defeat, Muramasa becomes unstable, as he had absorbed hollows in order to sustain himself without a master. Many hollows spill forth from his body and he transforms into a form similar to an arrancar. Orihime tries to reach out to him to save him from his sorrow, but he attacks the group. Ichigo manages to slash through Muramasa, but he becomes even more unstable and transforms into a larger dome-shaped mass, engulfing Ichigo in the process. The formerly rebellious zanpakutō return with their owners to help Ichigo and his friends in the battle.
254	25	"Byakuya and Renji, the 6th Division Returns!"; Transliteration: "Byakuya to Renji, Rokubantai Futatabi!" (Japanese: 白哉と恋次、六番隊再び！)	Takeshi Yamaguchi	Kento Shimoyama	Junya Koshiba	January 19, 2010	May 20, 2012
The zanpakutō, having been released from their brainwashing with Mayuri's help, who also restored the destroyed zanpakto, fight the arriving Menos Grandes, but more come from a hole in the sky. Byakuya manages to seal the hole with spiritual energy gathered from all the other Soul Reapers. Despite their efforts, Ichigo remains trapped inside the dome, which continues growing larger.
255	26	"Final Chapter - Zanpakutō the Alternate Tale"; Transliteration: "Shūshō・Zanpakutō Ibun-hen" (Japanese: 終章・斬魄刀異聞編)	Kazunori Mizuno	Genki Yoshimura	Noriyuki Abe	January 26, 2010	May 27, 2012
As the dome grows unstable and the Soul Reapers fight the Gillians outside, Ichigo fights Muramasa, who is beginning to become a hollow, inside Kōga's inner realm, which is collapsing from the grudges of the hollows he consumed to sustain himself. Ichigo questions Muramasa's devotion to Kōga in spite of his apparent motives for freeing the zanpakutō, insisting that he should know what a true bond between a Soul Reaper and a zanpakutō is. Ichigo defeats Muramasa, causing the two to leave his inner world. Muramasa dies after realizing the error of his ways, and Byakuya thanks Ichigo.
256	27	"The Angered Byakuya! The Collapse of the Kuchiki House!"; Transliteration: "Ikari no Byakuya! Kuchiki-ke Hōkai!" (Japanese: 怒りの白哉！朽木家崩壊！)	Mitsutaka Noshitani	Masahiro Okubo	Kazunori Mizuno	February 2, 2010	June 3, 2012
While Byakuya allows his squad to hold a hanami at his mansion, two strange attackers, one that is masked and the other resembling a satyr, arrive, but the masked one is quickly defeated by Sode no Shirayuki and Senbonzakura, who among all zanpakutō have since rematerialized, while the satyr one escapes. Mayuri refers to these attackers as "sword beasts", which are zanpakutō whose masters have been killed. Rukia and Sode no Shirayuki try luring out the satyr sword beast by having a drinking party, but fail. Soon, Rukia and Sode no Shirayuki find the satyr sword beast attacking and eventually defeat him together, capturing him and turning him in for study. Ukitake and Kyōraku become concerned at this development, noting that the Seireitei is still being rebuilt.
257	28	"A New Enemy! The True Nature of the Sword Beasts"; Transliteration: "Aratana Teki! Tōjū no Shōtai" (Japanese: 新たな敵！刀獣の正体)	Junya Koshiba	Genki Yoshimura	Yasuyuki Honda	February 9, 2010	June 10, 2012
In the real world, Ichigo encounters and fights a sword beast. When Hitsugaya comes to aid Ichigo, the sword beast retreats. Ukitake and Kyōraku infer that there are at least as many sword beasts as the number of Soul Reapers lost in the war, and the two plan on stabilizing the sword beasts to have them return to their sword forms, despite Mayuri's lack of interest. The sword beast is attacked by a hollow, but he manages to fuse with it. The hollow sword beast overpowers Haineko when she tries to fight him, but Ichigo is able to disarm him. The hollow sword beast fires a cero blast at Ichigo, but Hitsugaya manages to destroy it, noting that the sword beasts are more dangerous than he had thought.
258	29	"Stray Snake, Tortured Monkey"; Transliteration: "Maigo no Hebi, Junan no Saru" (Japanese: 迷子の蛇、受難の猿)	Rokō Ogiwara	Kento Shimoyama	Hodaka Kuramoto	February 16, 2010	June 17, 2012
Renji and Zabimaru come to the real world following a sword beast. Zabimaru's two halves, Saru and Hebi, split up to search. Although they quickly find a boomerang sword beast, he escapes. Hebi follows him and is convinced that being free is better. Hebi, having trouble doing anything due to being unseen by the public, meets Karin Kurosaki and Yuzu Kurosaki, the former being the only one able to see him, who both end up taking him home. Meanwhile, at a park, Renji notices that Saru is feeling lonely without Hebi around. Ichigo returns home at night, only to find Hebi, who realizes that Ichigo is a substitute Soul Reaper. Hebi runs away, only to encounter the boomerang sword beast again. As they battle each other, Hebi has the advantage until the boomerang sword beast captures Karin, who was following Hebi. Renji and Saru come to rescue Hebi and defeat the boomerang sword beast. Ichigo takes Karin home, convincing her it was all a dream, even though she knew otherwise. Having resolved his differences, Hebi returns with Renji and Saru to the Soul Society.
259	30	"Terror! The Monster That Lurks Underground"; Transliteration: "Kyōfu! Chika ni Hisomu Kaibutsu" (Japanese: 恐怖！地下に潜む怪物)	Hodaka Kuramoto	Masahiro Okubo	Hiroki Takagi	February 23, 2010	June 24, 2012
Ikkaku, Hanatarō Yamada, Nanao Ise and Hōzukimaru are sent to investigate some thefts that have taken place and track the culprit to the sewers. They are attack by a large monster, which manages to injure Ikkaku. The rest discover a white robot, who has the stash of stolen items. The large monster, revealed to be a tentacle sword beast, attacks the group again. The robot heals Ikkaku and fires a powerful blast at the tentacle sword beast, destroying it. It is revealed that the robot is Hanatarō's zanpakutō, Hisagomaru, which had resisted Muramasa's control because it did not resent Hanatarō. The group returns the stolen items, but Hisagomaru was separated from the group.
260	31	"Conclusion?! Hisagi vs. Kazeshini"; Transliteration: "Ketchaku!? Hisagi tai Kazeshini" (Japanese: 決着!? 檜佐木vs風死)	Mitsue Yamazaki	Kento Shimoyama	Shigeru Ueda	March 2, 2010	July 1, 2012
When Ikkaku, Iba, Kira and Hisagi go on a mission to fight a gang of sword beasts in the Rukongai, Kazeshini, despite being free of Muramasa's control, has a brief fight with Hisagi. After killing a sword beast, Kazeshini finds a dying man who begs him to take care of his child. Kazeshini is frequently annoyed by the child's behavior, but often shows concern for it, and abandons a chance to attack Hisagi when he hears it crying. After defeating another sword beast that is attacking a woman who came for the child, he leaves the child with the woman and goes to confront Hisagi. Kazeshini faces Hisagi in one last fight, but is inhibited by a back wound obtained earlier while protecting the child and is defeated, turning back into a normal zanpakutō.
261	32	"The Person with the Unknown Ability! Orihime Is Targeted"; Transliteration: "Michinaru Nōryokusha! Nerawareta Orihime" (Japanese: 未知なる能力者！狙われた織姫)	Hiroaki Nishimura	Genki Yoshimura	Tetsuhito Saito	March 9, 2010	July 8, 2012
While Ichigo, Rukia and Urahara investigate a sword beast attacking students, a girl named Kyōko Haida, who has the ability to predict the future and know things she would otherwise not, transfers to Karakura High School. Orihime tries to become friends with her, but learns that her best friend, Mai Suzuki, rejected her after learning of her ability. A mouthless sword beast merges with Kyōko and tries to take over her body to kill Mai, but Ichigo, Rukia and Orihime confront it. Orihime uses her healing powers to separate the mouthless sword beast from Kyōko, and Ichigo manages to defeat it with Getsuga Tenshō. Afterward, Orihime and Kyōko become friends, with Orihime accepting Kyōko's abilities.
262	33	"Haineko Cries! The Tragic Sword Beast!"; Transliteration: "Higeki no Tōjū! Haineko, Gōkyū!" (Japanese: 悲劇の刀獣！灰猫、号泣！)	Kazunobu Shimizu	Kento Shimoyama	Masahiko Komino	March 16, 2010	July 15, 2012
While on a mission with Rangiku to fight sword beasts, Haineko encounters one named Narunosuke, whose master was a coward, and who went with the others in order to become stronger. Haineko becomes friends with Narunosuke, sneaking him food and medicine despite the belief that the sword beasts inevitably lose control of themselves. As feared, Narunosuke gradually does lose control of his mind and body, and Rangiku arrives to deal with him. Haineko tries to stop her, but when Narunosuke becomes too dangerous, she is ultimately forced to destroy him.
263	34	"Imprisonment?! Senbonzakura & Zabimaru"; Transliteration: "Yūhei!? Senbonzakura to Zabimaru" (Japanese: 幽閉!? 千本桜&蛇尾丸)	Yasuto Nishikata	Masahiro Okubo	Yasuto Nishikata	March 23, 2010	July 22, 2012
While delivering a hammer sword beast to the twelfth division barracks, Senbonzakura and Zabimaru find themselves caught in the barrack's intruder containment system when the former messes around with a remote control. After Senbonzakura fails to break the glass case with his shikai, much to Zabimaru's annoyance, Ashisogi Jizō passes by, but it is unable to hear them due to the glass case being soundproof. Ashisogi Jizō accidentally break the remote control, making an irritated Senbonzakura to use his bankai to destroy the glass case, which sets off a lockdown mechanism. Senbonzakura and Zabimaru run past the closing gates, leading them to a control room that surprisingly monitors the perimeters of the Seireitei. Senbonzakura sets off explosions all over the place after messing around with all the buttons. When a maddened Ashisogi Jizō appears, Senbonzakura and Zabimaru each use their bankai at it, destroying the control room as well as the rest of the barracks. This catches the attention of the other Soul Reapers, especially Renji, who is gravely disappointed. Later, when it is reported that Senbonzakura is leading a group to hunt down a sword beast, Zabimaru goes after him to avoid writing apology letters.
264	35	"Battle of the Females? Katen Kyōkotsu vs. Nanao!"; Transliteration: "Onna no Tatakai? Katen Kyōkotsu tai Nanao!" (Japanese: 女の戦い？花天狂骨vs七緒！)	Mitsutaka Noshitani	Kento Shimoyama	Hodaka Kuramoto	March 30, 2010	July 29, 2012
Kyōraku has Nanao go with the kunoichi bodyguard of Katen Kyōkotsu to find a sword beast, while the mistress of Katen Kyōkotsu sips sake with Kyōraku. Nanao later spots the kunoichi bodyguard fighting a bearded sword beast, but she toys with him instead of trying to defeat him, which causes Nanao to become very concerned to the point of restraining her. Later, with Rangiku's help, Nanao then tries to bond with kunoichi bodyguard. After many methods to open up to her ultimately fail, Nanao plans to have a party for the kunoichi bodyguard under the cherry blossoms. Nanao realizes that the kunoichi bodyguard takes an interest in cherry blossoms, pinning one to her hair. Not before long, the bearded sword beast returns, cutting Nanao's arm. Remembering that she set down her weapon down near a cherry blossom tree, the kunoichi bodyguard is rendered defenseless, although she still has the determination to fight back. When the bearded sword beast kicks the kunoichi bodyguard into a wall, he tries to finish Nanao off, that is until Kyōraku shows up and defeats him. During the party, the kunoichi bodyguard returns the favor by pinning a cherry blossom to Nanao's hair.
265	36	"Evolution?! The Menace of the Final Sword Beast!"; Transliteration: "Shinka!? Saigo no Tōjū no Kyōi!" (Japanese: 進化!? 最後の刀獣の脅威！)	Junya Koshiba	Masahiro Okubo	Junya Koshiba	April 6, 2010	August 5, 2012
Kazeshini attacks a cleaver sword beast that has been cornered by the ninth division, but the cleaver sword beast turns back into sword form before Kazeshini prepares for a fatal blow, confusing him. Kazeshini, Zabimaru, Hōzukimaru and Ruri'iro Kujaku gather together to discuss that an unknown sword beast is absorbing the spiritual energies of other sword beasts, causing them to turn back their sword forms. It is shown that the unknown sword beast has done this to a yōkai sword beast. The next day, the unknown sword beast attacks a lion sword beast, a face sword beast and an ape sword beast in the streets of the Rukongai, absorbing each of their spiritual energies. All of the zanpakutō decide to face this sword beast, recognized as Kirikaze, without their owners. They soon realize that their attacks are no match against Kirikaze due to his ability to transform into mist. Their owners arrive and convince them that Soul Reapers and zanpakutō must fight as one in order to win the battle. All of the zanpakutō give what little spiritual energy they have left to Renji, who is then able to activate his bankai, finishing Kirikaze off once and for all. Although the zanpakutō return to their sword forms, the Soul Reapers note that they can still feel the presence of their zanpakutō.

== Home media release ==
=== Japanese ===
Zanpakutō: The Alternate Tale arc
Volume	Release date	Episodes
1	May 26, 2010	230–233
2	June 23, 2010	234–237
3	July 21, 2010	238–241
4	August 25, 2010	242–245
5	September 22, 2010	246–249
6	October 27, 2010	250–253
7	November 24, 2010	254–257
8	December 15, 2010	258–261
9	January 26, 2011	262–265
