= Shion Tsuji =

Japanese singer-songwriter

- Born: 10 January 1990 (age 36)
- Origin: Yokohama, Japan
- Genres: J-Pop
- Occupation: Singer-songwriter
- Instrument: Guitar
- Years active: 2008–present
- Labels: DefStar Records (2008–2011); Victor Entertainment (2016 – )
- Website: tsujishion.net

Shion Tsuji (辻詩音, Tsuji Shion) is a Japanese singer-songwriter. She is best known for her song "Sky Chord (Otona ni Naru Kimi e)," which was used as the ending theme song for the anime Bleach (the 18th song to be used for the ending credits of the anime) and her song "I Wanna Love (Ai Ga Hoshi Yo)," which was used as the second opening theme for the "Repeat Show" re-run airing of the anime Soul Eater

== Biography ==
Tsuji began writing lyrics in elementary school, and at 15 started playing the guitar. At this time, she starting composing music to set to the lyrics she had written at nine years of age. In order to pursue a career in music, she dropped out of high school in her first year. Half a year after this, she started performing at many different live houses, and at 17 recorded her first demo CD.

In November 2008, she debuted under DefStar Records with the single "Candy Kicks".

== Discography ==
=== Albums ===
Year	Album Information	Oricon Albums Charts	Reported sales
2010	Catch!: Released: 19 May 2010; Label: DefStar Records (DFCL-1626); Formats: CD, digital download	31	2,000
2016	OH! MY MISTAKES!: Released: 21 December 2016; Label: Victor Entertainment (VICL-64701); Formats: CD, digital download	161	-
2018	Watashino Oukoku (わたしの王国 My Kingdom): Released: 24 October 2018; Label: Bellwood Records (BZCS-1172); Formats: CD, digital download	-	-

=== Singles ===
Release	Title	Notes	Chart positions		Oricon sales	Album
Release	Title	Notes	Oricon Singles Charts	Billboard Japan Hot 100	Oricon sales	Album
2008	"Candy Kicks"	Count Down TV November opening theme.	85	9	1,500	Catch!
2009	"Sky Chord (Otona ni Naru Kimi e)" (Ｓｋｙ ｃｈｏｒｄ～大人になる君へ～, Becoming an Adult to You)	Anime Bleach ending theme.	44	70	4,500	Catch!
2009	"M/elody"	Anime Tokyo Magnitude 8.0 ending theme.	99	81	900	Catch!
2009	"Hoshii Mono" (ほしいもの, What I Want)	Film Watashi Dasu wa theme song.	100	—	600	Catch!
2010	"Hello Goodbye" (ハローグッバイ, Harō Gubbai)	Radio single, variety show Duòmo May ending theme.	—	91	—	Catch!
