= Miwa discography =

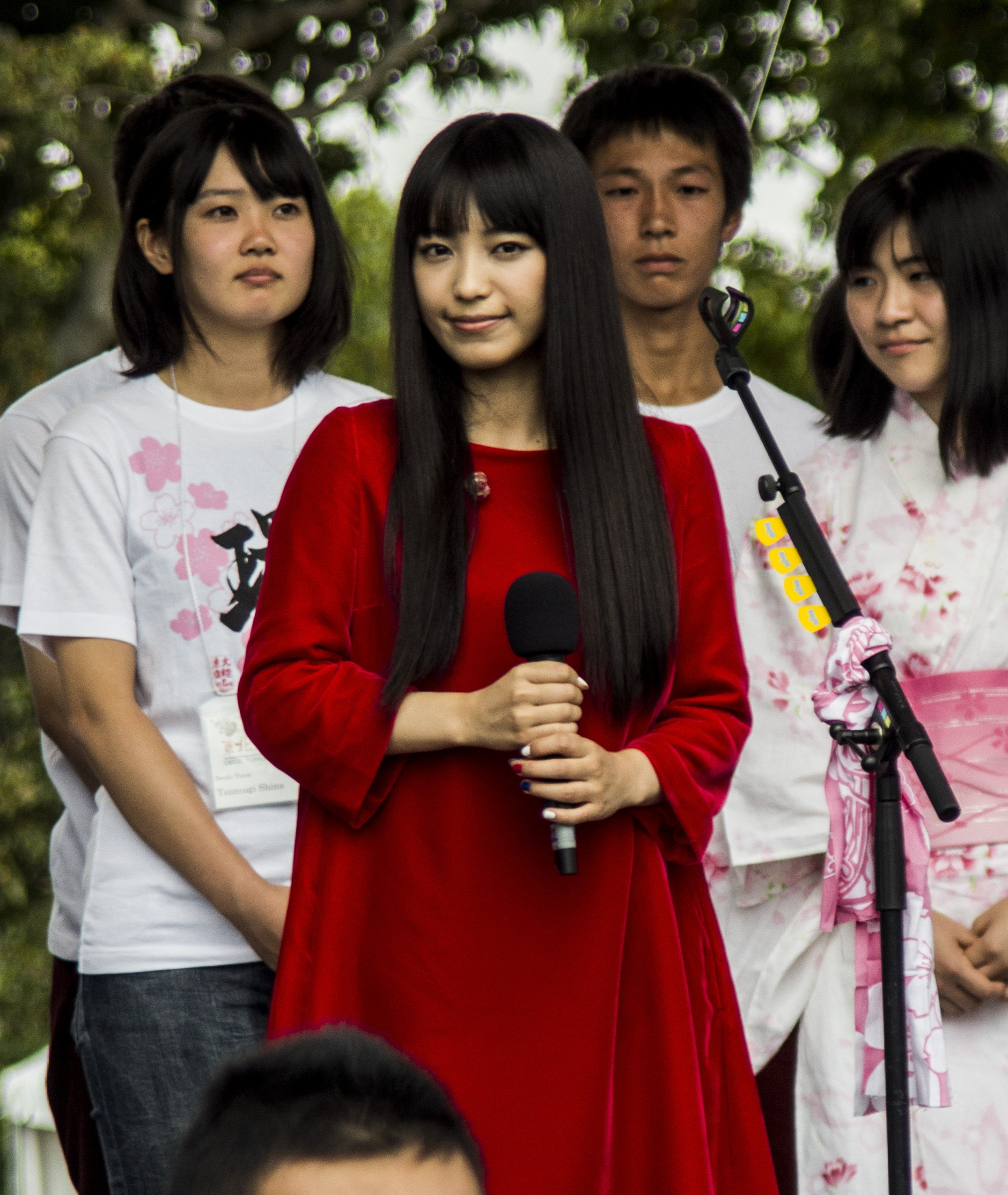
- Miwa at Champ-de-Mars in Paris (2014)
- Studio albums: 7
- Compilation albums: 2
- Singles: 25
- Video albums: 7

The discography of Japanese musician Miwa consists of seven studio albums, two compilation albums, seven video albums and twenty-five singles. After releasing two independent singles, Miwa debuted through major label Sony Music Entertainment Japan with the single "Don't Cry Anymore" (2010), a song used as the theme song of the drama Nakanai to Kimeta Hi. The song was commercially successful, and was eventually certified Platinum by the Recording Industry Association of Japan. This song, along with her third single "Change", used as a theme song for the anime Bleach, led her debut album Guitarissimo (2011) to debut at number one on Oricon's album charts.

Miwa's most commercially successful song is "Hikari e" (2012), used as the theme song for the Shun Oguri drama Rich Man, Poor Woman, which was certified Million for digital downloads.

== Studio albums ==
List of albums, with selected chart positions
Title	Album details	Peak positions			Sales (JPN)	Certifications
Title	Album details	JPN	KOR Overseas (Note: Week references for Gaon: Guitarissimo, Guitarium, Delight.)	TWN East Asian (Note: Position were taken as follows: Guitarium 2012 week 12, Delight 2013 week 21, Oneness.)	Sales (JPN)	Certifications
Guitarissimo	Released: April 6, 2011 (JPN); Label: Sony; Formats: CD, CD/DVD, digital download	1	31	3	71,000	RIAJ: Gold
Guitarium	Released: March 14, 2012 (JPN); Label: Sony; Formats: CD, CD/DVD, digital download	3	30	14	67,000	RIAJ: Gold
Delight	Released: May 22, 2013 (JPN); Label: Sony; Formats: CD, CD/DVD, digital download	1	25	18	130,000	RIAJ: Gold
Oneness	Released: April 8, 2015 (JPN); Label: Sony; Formats: CD, CD/DVD, digital download	3	—	5	75,000	
Splash World	Released: February 22, 2017 (JPN); Label: Sony; Formats: CD, CD/DVD, digital download	5	—	—	45,000	
Sparkle	Released: February 23, 2022 (JPN); Label: Sony; Formats: CD, CD/DVD, digital download	15	—	—		
7th	Released: May 29, 2024 (JPN); Label: Sony; Formats: CD, digital download	9	—	—	4,982	

== Compilation albums ==
List of albums, with selected chart positions
Title	Album details	Peak positions	Sales (JPN)
Title	Album details	JPN	Sales (JPN)
Miwa Ballad Collection: Graduation	Released: January 20, 2016 (JPN); Label: Sony; Formats: CD/Blu-ray, digital download	1	40,000
Miwa	Released: March 26, 2025 (JPN); Label: Sony; Formats: 2×CD, digital download	43	1,542

== Singles ==
=== As a lead artist ===
List of singles, with selected chart positions
Title	Year	Peak chart positions		Sales (JPN)	Certifications	Album
Title	Year	JPN Oricon	JPN Hot 100 (Note: Sources for chart positions are as follows: "Don't Cry Anymore", "Little Girl", "Change", "Otoshimono", "Kitakaze (Kimi ni Todokimasu Yō ni)", "Haru ni Nattara", "441", "Friday-Ma-Magic", "All You Need Is Love", "Kataomoi", "Hikari e", "Whistle (Kimi to Sugoshita Hibi)", "Miracle", "Delight", "Faraway", "Kiss You", "Faith", "It's You!" "Kimi ni Deaeta kara", "Kibō no Wa", "Fighting-φ-Girls", "360°", "Oneness", "Yozora", "Stress Free", "Kinenbi", "Anata ga Koko ni Ite Dakishimeru Koto ga Dekiru nara", "Princess", "Yui", "Shiny", "Under The Sea", "We Are The Light". "Update",)	Sales (JPN)	Certifications	Album
"Song for You"	2007	—	—			Non-album singles
"Today"	2007	—	—			Non-album singles
"Soba ni Itai Kara" (そばにいたいから; "Because I Want to Be Near You")	2008	—	—			Non-album singles
"Don't Cry Anymore"	2010	11	2	23,000	RIAJ (download): Platinum	Guitarissimo
"Little Girl" (リトルガール, Ritoru Gāru)	2010	18	34	8,000		Guitarissimo
"Change"	2010	8	12	20,000	RIAJ (cellphone): Gold	Guitarissimo
"Otoshimono" (オトシモノ; "Lost Item")	2010	14	39	18,000	RIAJ (download): Gold	Guitarissimo
"Haru ni Nattara" (春になったら; "When It Becomes Spring")	2011	11	22	16,000		Guitarissimo
"441" (Yon Yon Ichi)	2011	7	11	21,000		Guitarium
"Friday-Ma-Magic"	2011	9	15	19,000		Guitarium
"Kataomoi" (片想い; "Unrequited love")	2012	7	8	22,000	RIAJ (download): Gold	Guitarium
"Hikari e" (ヒカリヘ; "To the Light")	2012	4	4	81,000	RIAJ (cellphone): Million; RIAJ (physical): Gold; RIAJ (streaming): Platinum	Delight
"Whistle (Kimi to Sugoshita Hibi)" (ホイッスル～君と過ごした日々～; "Whistle (Days Spent with You)")	2013	4	2	41,000		Delight
"Miracle" (ミラクル, Mirakuru)	2013	6	4	34,000	RIAJ (download): Platinum	Delight
"Faraway"	2013	6	6	30,000		Oneness
"Kiss You"	2013	6	20	30,000		Non-album single
"Faith"	2014	4	2	46,000		Oneness
"Kimi ni Deaeta Kara" (君に出会えたから; "Because I Met You")	2014	4	2	34,000	RIAJ (download): Gold	Oneness
"Kibō no Wa" (希望の環（WA）; "Circle of Hope")	2014	10	10	26,000		Oneness
"Gesshoku (Winter Moon)" (月食; "Lunar Eclipse")	2014	10	—	26,000		Oneness
"Fighting-φ-Girls" (Faitingu Fai Gāruzu)	2015	5	6	24,000		Oneness
"360°"	2015	5	5	31,000		Oneness
"Yozora" (夜空。; "Night Sky") (featuring Hazzie)	2015	8	4	32,000	RIAJ (download): Gold; RIAJ (streaming): Gold	Miwa Ballad Collection
"Stress Free" (ストレスフリー, Sutoresufurī)	2015	8	88	32,000		Oneness
"Anata ga Koko ni Ite Dakishimeru Koto ga Dekiru nara" (あなたがここにいて抱きしめることができるなら; "If You Were Here and I Could Hold You")	2015	8	3	26,000		Miwa Ballad Collection
"Princess"	2016	5	7	25,000		Splash World
"Yui" (結 -ゆい-)	2016	9	17	17,000		Splash World
"Shiny" (シャイニー, Shainī)	2017	12	26	11,000		—N/a
"We Are the Light"	2017	10	13	11,000		—N/a
"Update" (アップデート, Appudēto)	2018	11	13			—N/a
"Reboot" (リブート, Ribūto)	2019	12	—	8,000		—N/a
"Who I Am"	2020	—	—			

=== As a featured artist ===
List of singles, with selected chart positions
Title	Year	Peak chart positions		Sales (JPN)	Album
Title	Year	JPN Oricon	JPN Hot 100	Sales (JPN)	Album
"All You Need Is Love" (among Japan United with Music)	2012	11	11	26,000	Non-album single
"Kinenbi" (記念日。; "Anniversary") (Hazzie featuring Miwa)	2015	—N/a	27		Hazzie Best
"A Red Ray" (Sugizo feat. miwa)	2019				Love & Tranquility

=== Promotional singles ===
Title	Year	Peak chart positions	Album
Title	Year	JPN Hot 100	Album
"Kitakaze (Kimi ni Todokimasu Yō ni)" (北風～君にとどきますように～; "North Wind (So that I Can Reach You)")	2011	99	We Love Mackey
"Ikutsu ni Natte mo" (いくつになっても; "No Matter How Old I Get")	2012	— (Note: Charted at number 73 on the Hot Top Airplay chart.)	Guitarium
"Delight"	2013	43	Delight
"Oneness"	2015	15	Oneness
"Under The Sea"	2017	99	"We Are the Light" (single)

== Other charted songs ==
Title	Year	Peak chart positions		Album
Title	Year	JPN Hot 100	JPN RIAJ Digital Track Chart (Note: The RIAJ Digital Track Chart is a depreciated chart that ran from 2009 until early 2012 and tracked full-length cellphone downloads.) (Note: Sources for chart positions are as follows: "Boku ga Boku de Aru Tame ni", "Chasing Hearts".)	Album
"Boku ga Boku de Aru Tame ni" (僕が僕であるために; "For Me to Be Me")	2010	—	42	"Haru ni Nattara" (single)
"Chasing Hearts"	2011	—	60	"441" (single)
"It's You!"	2014	96	—	"Faith" (single)

== Video albums ==
List of media, with selected chart positions
Title	Album details	Peak positions	
Title	Album details	JPN DVD	JPN Blu-ray
Miwa Live Tour 2011 "Guitarissimo"	Released: December 21, 2011 (JPN); Label: Sony; Formats: DVD, Blu-ray	29	28
Miwa Clips Vol. 1	Released: June 6, 2012 (JPN); Label: Sony; Formats: DVD, Blu-ray	8	7
Miwa Concert Tour 2012 "Guitarium"	Released: December 5, 2012 (JPN); Label: Sony; Formats: DVD, Blu-ray	5	10
Miwa Live at Budōkan: Sotsugyōshiki (武道館 ～卒業式～; "Graduation Ceremony")	Released: July 24, 2013 (JPN); Label: Sony; Formats: DVD, Blu-ray	8	17
Miwa Concert Tour 2013 "Delight"	Released: January 8, 2014 (JPN); Label: Sony; Formats: DVD, Blu-ray	3	10
Miwa Spring Concert 2014 "Shibuya Monogatari: Kan" (渋谷物語～完～; "Shibuya Story: Perfect")	Released: August 13, 2014 (JPN); Label: Sony; Formats: DVD, Blu-ray	3	3
Miwa Live at Budōkan: Acoguissimo	Released: September 30, 2015 (JPN); Label: Sony; Formats: DVD, Blu-ray	7	9
Miwa "Ballad Collection" Tour 2016: Graduation	Released: June 15, 2016 (JPN); Label: Sony; Formats: DVD, Blu-ray	7	6
Miwa Arena Tour 2017 "Splash World"	Released: September 27, 2017 (JPN); Label: Sony; Formats: DVD, Blu-ray	7	12
