= Usotsuki =

Usotsuki (Japanese 嘘吐き(うそつき)) lit. 'liar' may refer to:

== Music ==
- Usotsuki (Something Else song)
- Usotsuki (Aya Ueto song)
- "Usotsuki", song by Blue Hearts (band) from the album Stick Out
- "Usotsuki", song by Miwa (singer) from the single Otoshimono (song)
- "Usotsuki", song by DoCo (band), ending of the fourth Ranma ½ OAV
- "Usotsuki", song by Yorushika, ending of the anime movie A Whisker Away (2020)

== See also ==
- Usotsuki Paradox
