= Otoshimono (song) =

- CD only/digital download editions' cover

Single by miwa

from the album Guitarissimo
- B-side: "Usotsuki"; "Don't Cry Anymore" (piano version)
- Released: December 1, 2010
- Genre: Pop
- Length: 5:28
- Label: Sony
- Songwriter: miwa
- Producer: Akihisa Matsuura

Miwa singles chronology
"Change" (2010)	"Otoshimono" (2010)	"Haru ni Nattara" (2010)

"Otoshimono" (オトシモノ; "Lost Item") is Japanese singer-songwriter miwa's fourth major label single, released on December 1, 2010.

== Track listing ==
All tracks are written by miwa.

No.	Title	Arranger	Length
1.	"Otoshimono" (オトシモノ "Lost Item")	Akihisa Matsuura	5:28
2.	"Usotsuki" (ウソつき "Liar")	L.O.E	3:57
3.	"Don't Cry Anymore" (Piano Version)	Satoshi Takebe	5:00
4.	"Otoshimono" (Instrumental)	Matsuura	5:28

== Chart rankings ==
Chart	Peak position
Oricon daily singles	8
Oricon weekly singles	11

=== Reported sales ===
Chart	Amount
Oricon physical sales	18,000
