= Guitarissimo =

Studio album by miwa
- Released: April 6, 2011
- Recorded: 2010–2011
- Genre: Pop rock; J-pop
- Length: 1:05:50
- Label: Sony; SRCL-7597 (CD+DVD); SRCL-7599 (regular edition)
- Producer: Naoki-T (track #1, 2, 3, 9); L.O.E (#4, 13); Akihisa Matsuura (#5, 6, 7, 11); Quatre-M (#8, 14); Daishi Kataoka (#10, 12)

Miwa chronology
Guitarissimo (2011)	Guitarium (2012)

Singles from Guitarissimo
- 1. "Don't Cry Anymore" Released: July 14, 2010; 2. "Little Girl" Released: June 23, 2010; 3. "Change" Released: September 1, 2010; 4. "Otoshimono" Released: December 1, 2010; 5. "Haru ni Nattara" Released: February 23, 2011

Guitarissimo (stylized as guitarissimo) is the debut studio album by Japanese singer-songwriter miwa. The album was released on April 6, 2011.

The album was originally scheduled to release a week earlier, on March 30; however, due to the Tōhoku earthquake and tsunami which happened prior to the original release date as well as its after-effects, the release date was delayed by a week.

== Track listing ==
All tracks are written by miwa

No.	Title	Arranger	Length
1.	"Arienai!!" (ありえない!! lit. "No Way!!")	Naoki-T	4:21
2.	"Don't Cry Anymore"	Quatre-M, Naoki-T	4:40
3.	"Friend (Kimi ga Waraeba)" (friend 〜君が笑えば〜)	Naoki-T	5:43
4.	"Haru ni Nattara" (春になったら lit. "When It Becomes Spring")	L.O.E	4:53
5.	"Hys-"	Akihisa Matsuura	3:30
6.	"Otoshimono" (オトシモノ lit. "Lost Item")	Matsuura	5:28
7.	"Dear Days"	Matsuura	5:34
8.	"Samenai Yume" (醒めない夢)	Quatre-M	3:26
9.	"Change"	Naoki-T	4:09
10.	"Megurogawa" (めぐろ川 lit. "Meguro River"; strings version)	Daishi Kataoka	5:48
11.	"Hatsu Natsu" (ハツナツ)	Matsuura	4:16
12.	"Little Girl" (リトルガール)	Kataoka	4:20
13.	"Bokura no Mirai" (僕らの未来)	L.O.E	5:16
14.	"Tsuyoku Naritai" (つよくなりたい)	Quatre-M	4:29
Total length:			1:05:50

== Charts ==
Guitarissimo became the first debut album by a solo singer-songwriter born in the Heisei period to debut at number one, on Oricon's albums chart.

Chart	Peak position	Sales total
Oricon Daily Chart	1	14,343
Oricon Weekly Chart	1	50,386
Oricon Monthly Chart	3	58,600
