= Bleach: Hell Verse =

2010 Japanese animated film directed by Noriyuki Abe

- Japanese theatrical poster

Japanese name
- Kanji: 劇場版BLEACH 地獄篇
Transcriptions
- Revised Hepburn: Gekijō-ban Burīchi: Jigoku-hen
- Directed by: Noriyuki Abe
- Screenplay by: Masahiro Ōkubo; Natsuko Takahashi
- Based on: Bleach by Tite Kubo
- Produced by: Noriko Kobayashi; Ken Hagino
- Starring: Masakazu Morita; Fumiko Orikasa; Kentaro Ito; Noriaki Sugiyama; Tōru Furuya; Kazuya Nakai
- Cinematography: Toshiyuki Fukushima
- Edited by: Junichi Uematsu
- Music by: Shirō Sagisu
- Production company: Studio Pierrot
- Distributed by: Toho
- Release date: December 4, 2010
- Running time: 94 minutes
- Country: Japan
- Language: Japanese
- Box office: ¥610 million (Japan)

Bleach: Hell Verse (Japanese: 劇場版BLEACH 地獄篇, Hepburn: Gekijō-ban Burīchi Jigoku-hen; lit. "Theatrical Feature Bleach: Hell") is a 2010 Japanese animated supernatural adventure film directed by Noriyuki Abe. It is the fourth and final animated film adaptation of the anime and manga series Bleach. In the film, Ichigo Kurosaki and his friends traverse through the world of Hell in order to save his younger sister, Yuzu. The film's theme song is "Save the One, Save the All", performed by T.M.Revolution, and the film's screenplay was written by Natsuko Takahashi and Masahiro Okubo, with Tite Kubo, author of the manga, overseeing the production.

The film was released in Japanese theatres on December 4, 2010 (in between episodes 299 and 300) and in the United States dubbed in November. A prologue for the film, titled Theatre Opening Commemoration! Hell Chapter: Prologue, was included in season 14 of the animation series and included in the regular TV Tokyo schedule, which aired on November 30, 2010. A promotional manga chapter, titled Imaginary Number 01: The Unforgivens, was published showing Shuren confronting Szayel Aporro Granz and Aaroniero Arruruerie in Hell. Additionally, a promotional information book called Bleach: Official Invitation Book The Hell Verse was also released to commemorate the release of Bleach: Hell Verse. The DVD was released on August 25, 2011, in Japan. The English dub was released on DVD and Blu-ray on December 4, 2012, in the United States and on February 24, 2013, in the United Kingdom.

== Plot ==
During the battle between the Substitute Soul Reaper (Note: In the Bleach universe, Soul Reapers are soldiers trusted with ushering the souls of the dead from the World of the Living to the afterlife realm known as Soul Society and with fighting Hollows, monstrous lost souls who can harm both ghosts and humans) Ichigo Kurosaki and Ulquiorra, Ichigo transforms into an incredibly powerful and uncontrollable Full Hollow form by Orihime Inoue's desperate cries. Meanwhile, deep in Hell, a skeletal figure in a pit of skulls, who had been watching the battle through flames, raises the chains restraining him

Some time later, Soul Reapers Rukia Kuchiki and Renji Abarai arrive in the human world to inspect a strange occurrence, though they remain vague about what. Shortly after, powerful masked spirits called Sinners attack Ichigo and his friends at school. When the mask of one of the spirits breaks, the gates of Hell appear, and a Kushanāda—one of the guardians of Hell—impales the spirit, dragging him into Hell. Sinners have to hide their faces to avoid being dragged back to Hell. During the battle, Ichigo's two sisters, Karin and Yuzu are attacked by Shuren, the leader of the Sinners. Ichigo returns in time to attack Shuren but can't defeat him. Kokutō, a Sinner not allied with Shuren, rescues Karin, but Shuren leaves with Yuzu. Kokutō offers to assist Ichigo by showing him the route into Hell, and Rukia, Renji, and Uryū Ishida decide to join the quest.

During a fight against Kushanāda, Ichigo's Hollow mask spontaneously manifests. Kokutō explains that Hell's negative energy has adverse side effects on individuals who possess Hollow-like abilities, and anyone killed in Hell will also get trapped. Kushanāda tortures Sinners by consuming them; consumed spirits are eventually reborn at a lower level, after which they are again caught and consumed in a cycle that continues until their will is completely crushed and their remains turn to dust. Confronted by Shuren's minions, Rukia, Renji, and Uryū fight while Ichigo and Kokutō move on to Shuren's lair, where Yuzu is held captive. Shuren orders Ichigo to destroy the gates of Hell, believing it will free the Sinners. After Shuren's group is defeated, Kokutō betrays Ichigo and reveals he tricked Shuren into luring Ichigo to Hell, and he wants to use Ichigo's Hollow powers to break the chains that tie him to Hell.

Kokutō then taunts Ichigo by revealing that Yuzu has become a Sinner, and cutting down Rukia, Uryū, and Renji. Ichigo angrily transforms into his Full Hollow form and blasts Kokutō with a power that destroys most of the chains binding him to Hell and partially destroys the gates of Hell. Renji breaks Ichigo's Hollow mask and activates a spell that teleports Ichigo and Yuzu out of Hell, leaving himself, Rukia, and Uryū trapped.

The Soul Reapers arrive to arrest Ichigo and begin to repair the now-broken gates. Orihime Inoue—a human with healing powers—is brought in to heal Yuzu, but her soul is forever bound to Hell after staying there too long, making her powers insufficient to undo Hell's bindings. However, Yuzu later spontaneously recovers on her own. Using a Kushanāda as a distraction while attempting to exit the gates, Ichigo returns and flies down to the deepest level of Hell, where Rukia has become a Sinner, while Renji and Uryū rot away. Ichigo fights Kokutō while fighting off his Hollow side. Surprisingly, the Kushanāda becomes a Skull-Clad armor for Ichigo, who explains that Hell itself is asking him for help. Ichigo breaks everyone's chains, saving his friends, while binding Kokutō in more chains that drag him away into the depths of Hell. Despite Rukia's warning, Ichigo discards the armor, and the Kushanāda chase them again. All four flee back from the finished and repaired gate before it vanishes, where they successfully jump out into the World of the Living and are caught by Orihime's shield, which safely lowers them to the ground.

In the post-credit scene, Yuzu is awake without remembering what happened to her. Relieved, Karin hugs her, ignoring Isshin, who just returned.

== Cast ==
Character	Japanese voice	English voice
Ichigo Kurosaki	Masakazu Morita	Johnny Yong Bosch
Rukia Kuchiki	Fumiko Orikasa	Michelle Ruff
Renji Abarai	Kentarō Itō	Wally Wingert
Uryū Ishida	Noriaki Sugiyama	Derek Stephen Prince
Orihime Inoue	Yuki Matsuoka	Stephanie Sheh
Yasutora Sado	Hiroki Yasumoto	Jamieson Price
Isshin Kurosaki	Toshiyuki Morikawa	Patrick Seitz
Yuzu Kurosaki	Ayumi Sena	Janice Kawaye
Karin Kurosaki	Rie Kugimiya	Kate Higgins
Kokutō	Kazuya Nakai	Travis Willingham
Shuren	Tōru Furuya	Benjamin Diskin
Gunjō	Masaki Aizawa	Taylor Henry
Garogai	Keikō Sakai	Jamie Simone
Taikon	Kōzō Shioya	Joe Ochman
Murakumo	Binbin Takaoka	Steve Kramer

== Other media ==
Light novel adaptation of movie was published on December 6, 2010.

Shuren appears in the PSP video game Bleach: Heat the Soul 7 as a downloadable content playable character, and Kokutō appears in the PS3 video game Bleach: Soul Resurrección as a normal playable character. The story and characters also made an appearance in the game Bleach: Brave Souls.
