= Something Else (Japanese band) =

Japanese band

Something Else was a Japanese male folk band from Kashiwa consisting of members Nobutaka Okubo, Daisuke Ito, and Chihiro Imai. Originally formed as Exit Line in 1994, they later changed their name to Something Else.

They debuted with the song "Kanashiki Nonfiction" in 1996, but remained relatively unknown until they released the song "Last Chance," in 1998.

== Members ==
- Nobutaka Okubo (大久保伸隆, B. September 24, 1974); Vocals and Acoustic Guitars.
- Daisuke Ito (伊藤大介, B. July 25, 1974); Acoustic Guitars and Vocals.
- Chihiro Imai (今井千尋, B. August 28, 1974); Bass Guitars and Vocals, who is also the husband of singer, Eiko Matsumoto. They announced in 2007, on October 10, that they are expecting their first child.

== Discography ==
=== Singles ===
#	Title	Release date
1	Kanashiki Nonfiction (悲しきノンフィクション, Sad Nonfiction)	October 23, 1996
2	days go by	March 12, 1997
3	Kaze to Ikitakatta (風と行きたかった, I wished to Go with the Wind)	October 8, 1997
4	Hansei no Uta (反省のうた, Song of Self-Examination)	February 6, 1998
5	Record (レコード)	June 17, 1998
6	Last Chance (ラストチャンス)	December 23, 1998
7	Sayonara Ja Nai (さよならじゃない, It’s not a Goodbye)	April 9, 1999
8	Ai no Uta (あいのうた, Love Song)	July 28, 1999
9	Usotsuki (ウソツキ, Liar)	February 16, 2000
10	Jishaku (磁石, Magnet)	November 8, 2000
11	Biidama (びいだま, Marble)	February 9, 2001
12	Natsu no Radio (夏のラジオ, Summer Radio)	February 6, 2002
13	Kokudo 16 (国道16, Route 16)	September 26, 2002
14	Shōnen (少年, Boy)	February 5, 2003
15	1M (1 meter)	October 16, 2003
16	Ano Koro no Mama (あの頃のまま, As those Days)	July 28, 2004

=== Albums ===
#	Title	Release date
1	Triple Play	March 6, 1998
2	502 (Go Maru Ni / Five O Two)	March 17, 1999
3	Guitarman (ギターマン)	March 8, 2000
4	Hikari no Ito (光の糸, Thread of Light)	March 7, 2001
5	Y	February 27, 2002
6	Ticket	March 12, 2003
7	Kazamidori (風見鶏, Weathervane)	May 14, 2003
8	Natsu Uta (夏唄, Summer Song)	August 25, 2004
9	Bandwagon (バンドワゴン)	June 1, 2005
10	Color	November 30, 2005
