= Usotsuki (Something Else song) =

Song by Something Else
- Language: Japanese

"Usotsuki" (ウソツキ, literally "Liar") is a 2000 song and single by Something ELse. It was the theme song of the Fuji-TV spin off movie Go-Con! starring Rina Uchiyama, and spent 12 weeks in the Oricon charts peaking at No. 24.

== Track listing ==
1. ウソツキ (Liar)
2. be there
3. ウソツキ (Liar//Backing Track)
