= Nakanai to Kimeta Hi =

- Genre: Drama
- Written by: Chiho Watanabe
- Directed by: Junichi Ishikawa
- Starring: Nana Eikura; Haruna Kawaguchi; Naohito Fujiki; Jun Kaname; Anne
- Ending theme: "Don't Cry Anymore" by miwa
- Composer: Yugo Kanno
- Country of origin: Japan
- Original language: Japanese
- No. of series: 1
- No. of episodes: 8

Production
- Producer: Fumi Hashimoto
- Running time: 54 minutes

Original release
- Network: Fuji TV
- Release: January 26 – March 16, 2010

Nakanai to Kimeta Hi (泣かないと決めた日) is a Japanese television drama series premiered on Fuji TV network on 26 January 2010, starring Nana Eikura in the lead role. The 1st episode and the last episode are 69 minutes long.

== Cast ==
- Nana Eikura as Miki Tsunoda
- Haruna Kawaguchi as Ai Tsunoda
- Naohito Fujiki as Seiji Kirino
- Jun Kaname as Shōta Nakahara
- Anne as Marika Tachibana
- Yasunori Danta as Jin Umezawa
- Yoshino Kimura as Yukiko Sano
- Shunji Igarashi as Kenji Nishijima
- Jun Hasegawa as Yoshito Tazawa
- Nana Katase as Chiaki Fujita
- Mahiru Konno as Kotomi Kurita
- Kurume Arisaka as Kyoko Shiraishi
- Marie Machida as Sanae Kudo
- Shige Uchida as Keisuke Suzuki
- Yusei Tajima as Makoto Inoue
- Aoba Kawai as Miho Hayashida
- Emi Tanaka as Mai Mizuta

== Awards ==
- 64th Television Drama Academy Awards: Best Supporting Actress: Anne
- 64th Television Drama Academy Awards: Best Theme Song: Don't Cry Anymore (miwa)

== See also ==
- Workplace politics

Preceded by Liar Game season 2 (10 November 2009 - 19 January 2010)	Fuji TV Tuesday Dramas; Tuesdays 21:00 - 21:54 (JST)	Succeeded by Zettai Reido (13 April 2010 - 22 June 2010)
