= Little Girl (Miwa song) =

- CD only/digital download editions' cover

Single by miwa

from the album Guitarissimo
- B-side: "Anata ga Inai to Sekai wa Konna ni Tsumaranai," "Soba ni Itai Kara"
- Released: June 23, 2010
- Genre: Pop rock
- Length: 4:20
- Label: Sony
- Songwriter: miwa
- Producer: Daishi Kataoka

Miwa singles chronology
"Don't Cry Anymore" (2010)	"Little Girl" (2010)	"Change" (2010)

"Little Girl" (リトルガール, Ritoru Gāru) is Japanese singer-songwriter miwa's second major label single, released on June 23, 2010. The B-side "Soba ni Itai Kara" is a re-recording of miwa's second independently released single from 2008.

== Writing and inspiration ==
The song is an upbeat pop-rock song. The lyrics of the song are self-referential, both to miwa as the songwriter and the song being a love song. miwa describes herself as a "little girl" who writes songs, plays her guitar and is sick of listening to love songs. The rest of the lyrics deal with expressing feelings to an "unusual boy" in a love song, and uses unusual metaphors to with maths/science (such as "you don't need equations in love," describing the boy as "flowing with minus ions" and saying that the boy is "the only one to receive my special frequency").

"Little Girl" was written during the summer holiday of her first year at university, as a potential candidate for her debut single. She wanted to "make a life-sized song that was very much her." She did not want to write a love song that applied to everyone, but one that was specific to just a certain two people.

== Promotion ==
The song was used as the June 2010 opening theme song for the music television show Countdown TV. miwa performed the song at Bokura no Ongaku on June 18, along with "Don't Cry Anymore" and a cover of Shikao Suga's "Ai ni Tsuite."

== Music video ==
miwa in the music video.

The music video was shot by director Hideyuki Tokigawa. It begins with scenes of miwa performing the song with a band at a brightly furnished café, her dressed casually with glasses writing down song lyrics at the bar at the same café. Interspersed between these scenes are shots of miwa and a man dressed in a rabbit suit, meeting outside in different settings (garden paths, fountains, fields). At the end of the video, she is shown walking away with the rabbit hand-in-hand.

== Track listing ==
All tracks are written by miwa.

No.	Title	Arranger	Length
1.	"Little Girl"	Daishi Kataoka	4:20
2.	"Anata ga Inai to Sekai wa Konna ni Tsumaranai" (あなたがいないと世界はこんなにつまらない "Without You, The World Is So Dull")	Naoki-T	4:22
3.	"Soba ni Itai Kara" (そばにいたいから "Because I Want to Be Near You")	miwa	4:31
4.	"Little Girl (Instrumental)"	Kataoka	4:20
Total length:			17:33

== Chart rankings ==
Chart	Peak position
Billboard Japan Hot 100	84
Oricon Weekly singles	18
RIAJ Digital Track Chart Top 100	59

=== Reported sales ===
Chart	Amount
Oricon physical sales	8,200
