= Don't Cry Anymore =

Single by miwa

from the album Guitarissimo
- B-side: "Meguro-gawa", "Wake Up, Break Out!"
- Released: March 3, 2010
- Genre: Pop rock
- Length: 4:40
- Label: Sony
- Songwriter: miwa
- Producer: Naoki-T

Miwa singles chronology
"Soba ni Itai Kara" (2008)	"Don't Cry Anymore" (2010)	"Little Girl" (2010)

"Don't Cry Anymore" (stylized as "don't cry anymore") is Japanese singer-songwriter miwa's debut major label single, released on March 3, 2010. It was used as the Nana Eikura starring drama Nakanai to Kimeta Hi's theme song. It was certified gold by the RIAJ for full-length cellphone downloads.

== Writing ==
The song is an upbeat pop rock song. The lyrics describe somebody instructing themself to stop crying and to be strong, no matter what. References are made to an end of a relationship, such as the song's protagonist "thinking that the happiness of feeling warmth while (she) slept would go on forever" (ぬくもり感じ眠ると幸せだった それが永遠に続くと思ってた なのに, nukumori kanjinemuru to shiawase datta, sora ga eien ni tsuzuku to omotteita nano ni). She feels that she wants to hear that person's voice again and to see them again, but knows that she must walk forward instead.

miwa felt that "Don't Cry Anymore" was less indicative of her personality than the B-sides of the single. miwa describes the B-side "Megurogawa" as a "comfortable and tender" song, that feels like her starting point from where she started to make music. It describes somebody yearning to tell a boy about her feelings for him, as she stands beside Meguro River in Tokyo, in spring with cherry blossoms lining the river. "Wake Up, Break Out!" was written in her first year at high school, and she performed this often at live houses. She believes the song has the feeling of a live performance, since she recorded it with the same band as she did for "Don't Cry Anymore."

== Promotion ==
The song was used as the Fuji Television drama Nakanai to Kimeta Hi's theme song. It was written specifically for the drama, after miwa was told about concept of the drama after the initial offer. The song was briefly used in commercials for Recochoku from late January 2010 onwards.

miwa participated in a high profile episode of the Fuji Television music show Music Fair, a month before the single's release. On it, she performed the song, as well as a cover of Cyndi Lauper's "True Colors" with Alan, Leona Lewis and Kana Nishino. Miwa also performed "Don't Cry Anymore" on NHK's Music Japan on 7 March. She also performed at the special 300th anniversary episode of Bokura no Ongaku a month after the single's release, performing a cover of Yumi Matsutoya's "Hello, My Friend" with Hiroshi Kamayatsu.

== Music video ==
Miwa in the music video.

The music video was shot by director Yuri Kanchiku. It depicts miwa in a dark room with several free-standing doorways. Whenever miwa travels through one of the doorways, she comes into the same room set up differently. The first time, it is set up for a frivolous banquet, with many different people dressed formally. The second time she enters it, the room is set up as if it were a busy park sidewalk, with many people dressed in work clothes ignoring her. She decides to sit down at a park bench. miwa later finds a birdcage, and the scene switches to depicting her trapped inside the birdcage, with the floor littered with sheet music.

Interspersed between these scenes are shots of miwa performing the song in the same room, backed with a guitarist, bassist, drummer, keyboardist and four member string section.

== Reception ==
The single received low level airplay for two weeks before its release, before becoming the second most played song in Japan for a week, under Adam Lambert's "For Your Entertainment." It charted in the top ten airplay songs for three weeks. In the same time period, the song had poor reception on Adult Contemporary radio stations, only peaking at #52. Two weeks later, the song reached a higher ranking of #31 among the adult contemporary stations, though never reaching the success of "Don't Cry Anymore" on the overall airplay charts.

On the physical charts, the single charted in the top 30 for three weeks, and the top 100 for six. It was a gradual seller - only selling 9,000 copies in its first week, but eventually selling 22,000 copies.

The song performed well in the digital market. It debuted at #14 on RIAJ's Chaku-uta Full charts, but the next week reached #3. It charted for a further two more weeks in the top 10. Its final week in the top 100 was 7 weeks after its debut, where it reached #56. It was certified gold for 100,000 Chaku-uta Full downloads for the March 2010 period.

Critically, CDJournal praised the song as being dynamic with "earnest lyrics." They noted an influence from Avril Lavigne and Carole King in the song. The song won the award for best drama theme song at the 64th The Television Drama Academy Awards, beating out songs such as Arashi's "Troublemaker" and Mr. Children's "Hanabi."

== Track listing ==
All tracks are written by miwa.

No.	Title	Arranger	Length
1.	"Don't Cry Anymore"	Quatre-M, Naoki-T	4:40
2.	"Meguro-gawa" (めぐろ川 "Meguro River")	Daishi Kataoka	4:34
3.	"Wake Up, Break Out!"	Quatre-M	4:43
4.	"Don't Cry Anymore (Instrumental)"	Quatre-M, Naoki-T	4:40
Total length:			18:45

== Chart rankings ==
"Don't Cry Anymore"
A sample of the chorus of "Don't Cry Anymore."

"Megurogawa"
The first B-side, describing someone yearning for a boy at Meguro River in Tokyo.

"Wake Up, Break Out!"
The second B-side, which Miwa often performed at lives before her debut.

Chart	Peak position
Billboard Japan Hot 100	2
Billboard Adult Contemporary Airplay	31
Oricon Weekly singles	11
RIAJ Digital Track Chart Top 100	3
RIAJ Digital Track Chart yearly top 100	77

=== Reported sales ===
Chart	Amount
Oricon physical sales	22,000
RIAJ Chaku-uta Full downloads	100,000+

== Personnel ==
- Tatsuhiro "Tabokun" Endo - bass
- Akitomo Fukushima - recording
- Hideo Kojima - drums
- Hiroyuki Matsugashita - electric guitar
- Miwa - acoustic guitar, chorus, songwriting, vocals
- Naoki-T - co-arranger, electric guitar, lead guitar, producer, programming, recording
- Quatre-M - co-arranger
- Toshio Uchida - electric guitar
- Risa Yamamoto - violin
- Takayoshi "Dr." Yamauchi - mixing
