= Miwa (singer) =

Japanese singer-songwriter (born 1990)

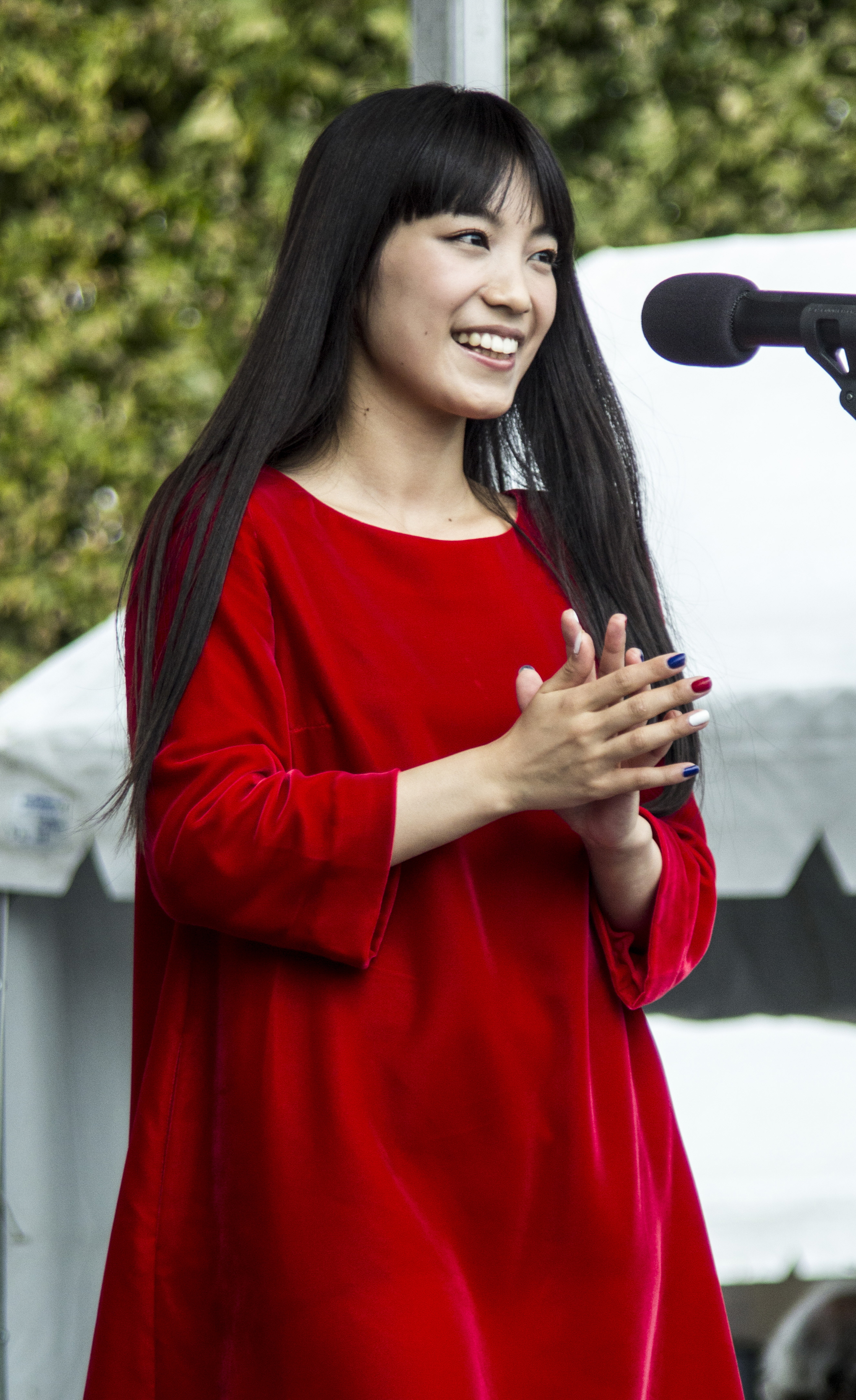
- Miwa in 2014

Background information
- Born: 15 June 1990 (age 34); Hayama, Kanagawa, Japan
- Genres: Pop rock
- Occupations: Singer; songwriter
- Instruments: Vocals; guitar; piano
- Years active: 2007–present
- Labels: private (2007–2008); Sony Music Entertainment Japan (2010–present)
- Website: www.miwa-web.com

Miwa (stylised as miwa) (born 15 June 1990) is a Japanese singer-songwriter. She debuted in 2010 with the single "Don't Cry Anymore", which was used as the theme song for the drama Nakanai to Kimeta Hi.

== Biography ==
=== History ===
Miwa was born in Hayama, Kanagawa, moving to Tokyo at a young age. Since her father had a great love for music, Miwa naturally began to enjoy music as she grew up.

Miwa began writing songs at 15. She began to teach herself how to play the guitar after she entered high school, but gave up and paid for professional lessons after discovering she wasn't making much progress on her own. Her high school had a ban on students having part-time jobs. Despite this, Miwa secretly worked and eventually used these savings by her second year of high school to buy a Gibson J-45 guitar. miwa played live concerts mostly around Shimokitazawa in Tokyo and in Okinawa in the summer (her parents had a house there). Due to her high school also having a ban on students working in the entertainment business, she had to do these gigs in secret (without even telling her school friends). During this time, Miwa released two self-published independent singles, "Song for You/Today" and "Soba ni Itai Kara" in 2007 and 2008.

Miwa was signed to Sony Music Entertainment Japan during her third year of high school. She debuted as an artist in 2010 while attending Keio University. Her debut single "Don't Cry Anymore" was chosen for the drama Nakanai to Kimeta Hi's theme song. The single was a minor commercial success, breaking the top 20 on Oricon's single charts and being certified by the RIAJ as selling 100,000 full length cellphone downloads a month after its release. In April 2010 the song won the award for best drama theme song at the 64th The Television Drama Academy Awards. miwa released her second single, "Little Girl," in late June. Her third single "Change" was the twelfth opening theme song for the Bleach anime, and was a top 10 single.

For the animated film adaptation of Eto Mori's novel Colorful, Miwa covered two songs by famous Japanese artists. Yutaka Ozaki's "Boku ga Boku de Aru Tame ni" was used as the film's image song and The Blue Hearts' song "Aozora" was used as the end theme. Both songs were released as digital downloads on August 12, 2010.

Miwa considers her favorite Western musicians to be Sheryl Crow, Deep Purple, Carole King, Avril Lavigne and Taylor Swift. Her favorite Japanese musicians are Aiko, Angela Aki, Radwimps and Yuki.

Miwa has previously been a DJ on monthly radio show on All Night Nippon, miwa no All Night Nippon R (MiwaのオールナイトニッポンR), every third Monday from 3:00 am to 5:00 am. It has since then been changed into a weekly show, now known as miwa no All Night Nippon (Miwaのオールナイトニッポン), airing every Tuesday (early Wednesday) from 1:00 am to 3:00 am.

Miwa released her first album Guitarissimo on April 6, 2011 (scheduled to release a week earlier but delayed due to the Tōhoku earthquake and tsunami and its aftereffects). The charts performance was Miwa's best overall: the album reached No. 1 in the Oricon's album charts, making Miwa the first Heisei period-born solo singer to reach a No. 1 on the album charts in the history of the Oricon.

She played a flautist in the film Maestro!.

On September 1, 2019, it was reported that she would marry Kosuke Hagino, a swimmer, in the fall of the same year. He also officially announced his marriage on the fan club site (although he did not specify the other person). On January 2, 2020, Hagino reported the birth of their first child. The gender and birth date of the child are not disclosed. However on March 18, 2024, the couple officially announced that they divorced through the fan club site.

== Discography ==
- Guitarissimo (2011)
- Guitarium (2012)
- Delight (2013)
- Oneness (2015)
- Splash World (2017)
- Sparkle (2022)
- 7th (2024)

== Filmography ==
- Maestro! (2015)
  - as supporting heroine Amane Tachibana
- The 100th Love with You (2017)
  - as Lead heroine Aoi Hinata
