= Kari Wahlgren filmography =

Artist filmography

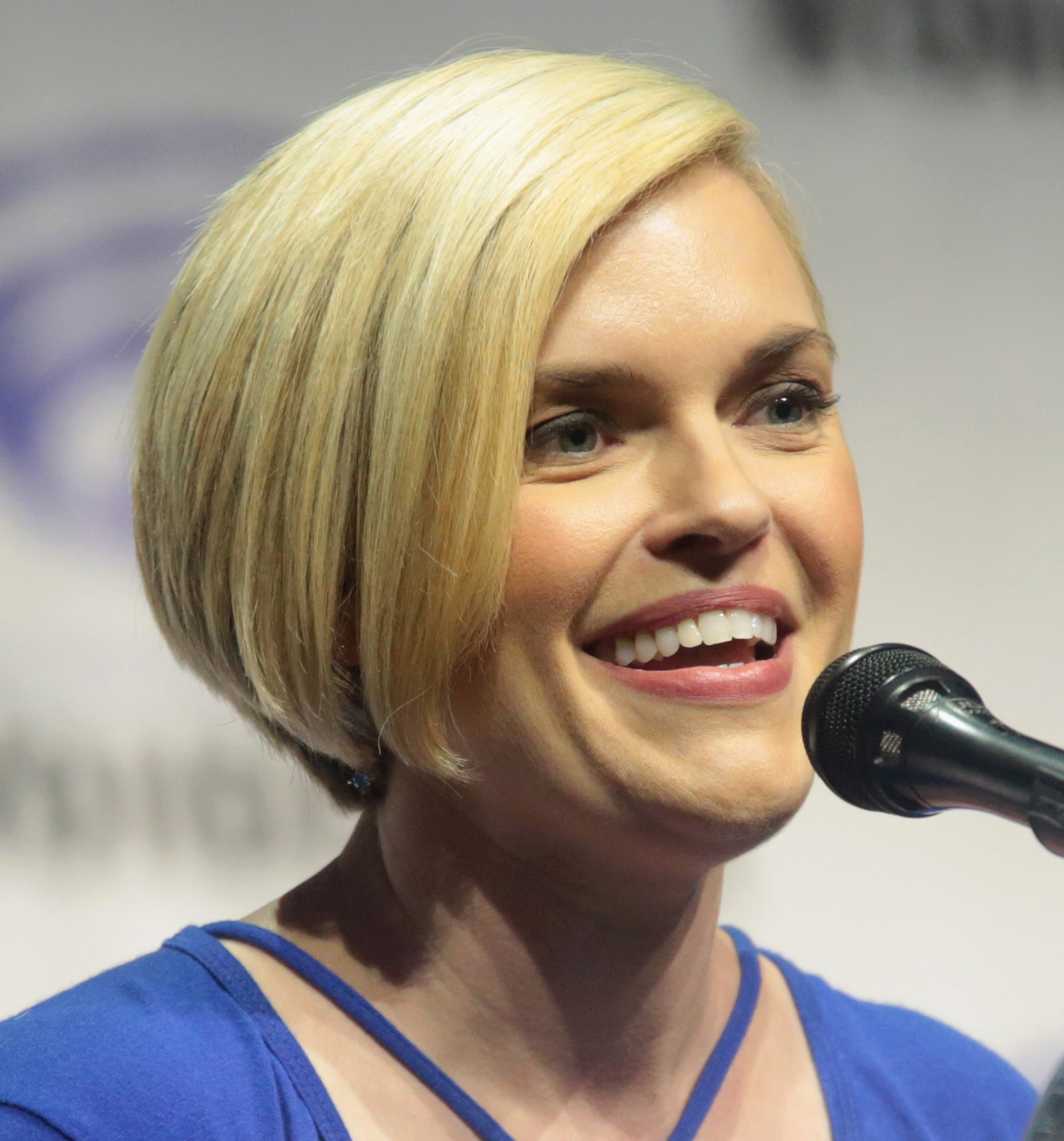
Wahlgren at WonderCon 2017

This is the filmography of American voice actress Kari Wahlgren.

== Voice-over filmography ==
=== Anime ===
List of dubbing performances in anime
Year	Title	Role	Notes	Ref(s)
2002	FLCL	Haruko Haruhara	Debut anime role	
2003	Ai Yori Aoshi	Chika Minazuki	as Key Jensen	
2003	Gatekeepers 21	Miu Manazuru	as Key Jensen	
2003	Heat Guy J	Kyoko Milchan	as Key Jensen	
2003	Figure 17	Tsubasa Shiina	as Key Jensen	
2003	A Little Snow Fairy Sugar	Cinnamon	as Kay Jensen, English Voice Cast	
2003	Mirage of Blaze	Miya Ohgi	as Jennifer Jean	
2003	Witch Hunter Robin	Robin Sena		
2003	Mao-chan	Misora Tsukishima, Chinami Noki	as Kay Jensen	
2003	Chobits	Kotoko	as Kay Jensen	
2003	Someday's Dreamers	Yume Kikuchi	as Kay Jensen	
2003	Last Exile	Lavie Head		
2003	The Twelve Kingdoms	Youka	as Jennifer Jean	
2004	Gad Guard	Arashi Shinozuka	as Jennifer Jean	
2004	Wolf's Rain	Cher Degre		
2004	Angel Tales	Goddess, Momo the Monkey	as Key Jensen	
2004	Ai Yori Aoshi Enishi	Chika Minazuki	as Key Jensen	
2004	Gungrave	Mika Asagi, young Brandon	as Key Jensen	
2005–06	Samurai Champloo	Fuu Kasumi		
2005–06	Immortal Grand Prix	Michiru Satomi, Luca		
2005	Scrapped Princess	Pacifica Casull		
2006–07	Eureka Seven	Anemone		
2007–09	Naruto	Tayuya, Ranmaru, Kunihisa, Hana Inuzuka, Onbu, Uroko		
2007	Robotech: The Shadow Chronicles	Ariel		
2007	The Melancholy of Haruhi Suzumiya	Tsuruya		
2007–08	Blood+	Saya Otonashi, Diva		
2008	Lucky Star	Kagami Hiiragi		
2008	Digimon Data Squad	Relena Norstein	Grouped under Voice Talents	
2008	Hellsing Ultimate	Rip van Winkle	Hellsing IV	
2010–13	Stitch!	Ms. Kawasaki, Marvin (Masa), Mr. Stenchy, Nora, Carmen		
2010–18	Naruto: Shippuden	Hotaru, Mikoto Uchiha, Naho, Tayuya		
2011	Durarara!!	Celty Sturluson	Nominated – 2011 BTVA Voice Acting Award	
2012–13	Tiger & Bunny	Karina Lyle / Blue Rose	Nominated – 2013 BTVA Anime Dub Award	
2013	Fate/Zero	Saber	Nominated – 2013 BTVA Anime Dub Award	
2015–16	Durarara!!×2	Celty Sturluson		
2015	The Disappearance of Nagato Yuki-chan	Tsuruya		
2015	Fate/stay night: Unlimited Blade Works	Saber		
2017	Blue Exorcist: Kyoto Saga	Karura		
2017	Fate/Grand Order: First Order	Saber	Anime special	
2018	Aggretsuko	Various		
2018	FLCL Progressive	Haruha Raharu		
2018	FLCL Alternative	Haruko Haruhara		
2020	Marvel Future Avengers	Wasp / Janet Van Dyne, Enchantress, Darkstar		
2022	Fate/Grand Carnival	Saber		
2023	FLCL Grunge	Haruko Haruhara		
2023	Record of Ragnarok	Hlökk	Season 2	
2024	Dandadan	Seiko Ayase		

=== Animation ===
List of voice performances in animation
Year	Title	Role	Notes	Ref(s)
2004–2006	Super Robot Monkey Team Hyperforce Go!	Nova, additional voices		
2005	Maya & Miguel	Johnny, Mrs. Lopez	Episode: "Team Santos"	
2005–2006	American Dragon: Jake Long	Mermaid, Centaur, Wood Nymph, Bride, Silver		
2005–2007	A.T.O.M.	Dr. Magness		
2006–2007	Ben 10	Charmcaster, Grey Matter (Gwen), Kid #4, Toddler Hex		
2006	Danger Rangers	Alice Buckster, Mom #2	Episode: "Dog Days"	
2006	Shorty McShorts' Shorts	Oki-Dokee	Episode: "The Phabulizers"	
2006–2008	Legion of Super-Heroes	Saturn Girl, Triplicate Girl, Shrinking Violet, Infectious Lass, Ayla Ranzz		
2007	Kim Possible	Electronique	Episode: "Stop Team Go"	
2007–09	Tak and the Power of Juju	Jeera, Bleeta		
2008	Lil' Bush	Lil' Hillary, Lil' Condi	Season 2	
2008–2012; 2025–present	Phineas and Ferb	Suzy Johnson		
2008–2012	The Life & Times of Tim	Gladys		
2008–2010	The Penguins of Madagascar	Jillie, Kitka		
2009	Random! Cartoons	Sparkles, Mom, Leprechaun	Episode: "Sparkles and Gloom"	
2009	Wolverine and the X-Men	Emma Frost, Magma, Dr. Sybil Zane, Christy Nord, Computer	Grouped under Voices	
2009	Back at the Barnyard	Sheila, Sissy	Episode: "Bling My Barn"	
2009	The Secret Saturdays	Abbey Gray, Charles, Ruby, Cody, Wyatt		
2009–10	Ben 10: Alien Force	Charmcaster		
2009–12	Fanboy & Chum Chum	Nancy Pancy	2 episodes	
2010–12	Kick Buttowski: Suburban Daredevil	Honey Buttowski		
2010–12	Ben 10: Ultimate Alien	Charmcaster, Rojo		
2010–2014	Fish Hooks	Shellsea, Snake		
2010	Zevo-3	Ellie Martin / Elastika		
2010–2012	The Avengers: Earth's Mightiest Heroes	Enchantress, Jane Foster, Karnilla		
2010–2011	Sym-Bionic Titan	Kimmy, Amber, Monica		
2011	Archer	Anka Scholtz	Episode: "Swiss Miss"	
2011	Regular Show	Movie Actress	Episode: "Do Me a Solid"	
2011	The Problem Solverz	Katrina Rad, Cupcake Girl	Episode: "Magic Clock"	
2011	Scooby-Doo! Mystery Incorporated	Young Judy Reeves, Regina Wentworth	2 episodes	
2011	Good Vibes	Milan Stone, Mrs. Wadska, Mrs. Stone		
2011–2016	Kung Fu Panda: Legends of Awesomeness	Tigress, Princess Mei Li, Ms. Yoon, Fang, Lam, additional voices	Nominated – 2012 BTVA Voice Acting Award	
2012	Robot and Monster	Baconeers, Gar-Gantuans		
2012–2016, 2020–2023	Bubble Guppies	Shelly, Avi's Mother, Dr. Martin, Bubble Kitty's Owner, Demanda, Additional Voices		
2012–2013	Kaijudo: Rise of the Duel Masters	Allie Underhill, various voices	Nominated – 2012 BTVA Voice Acting Award	
2012–2014	DC Nation Shorts	Black Canary, Elasti-Girl		
2012–2014	Randy Cunningham: 9th Grade Ninja	Morgan		
2012–2015	Winx Club	Faragonda, Narrator, various voices	Nickelodeon version, season 5 (Beyond Believix), grouped under Voices	
2012–2015	Teenage Mutant Ninja Turtles	Joan Grody, Woman, Little Girl		
2012–2016	Gravity Falls	Shandra Jimenez, Priscilla Northwest, Polly, additional voices		
2012–2022	Young Justice	Carol Ferris, J'ann M'orzz, Saturn Girl, Phantom Girl, Phantom Zone Projector		
2013	Star Wars: The Clone Wars	Letta Turmond	2 episodes Nominated – 2013 BTVA Voice Acting Award	
2013	Henry Hugglemonster	Ivor Hugglemonster, Izzy Snifflemonster		
2013	Monsters vs. Aliens	Young President Hathaway, Little Girl, Female Admin, Margaret	3 episodes	
2013–present	Rick and Morty	Jessica, D.I.A.N.E., Diane Sanchez, additional voices	Recurring roles	
2014	Ben 10: Omniverse	Charmcaster, Viktoria, Suemongousaur	4 episodes	
2014	TripTank	Troll, Troll Baby, Martian Woman		
2014	The Tom and Jerry Show	Fifi, Toots		
2014	Wander Over Yonder	Janet	Episode: "The Lonely Planet"	
2014	Hulk and the Agents of S.M.A.S.H.	Invisible Woman, Reporter	Episode: "Monsters No More"	
2014	All Hail King Julien	Female King Julien	Episode: "The Wrath of Morticus Khan"	
2014–2016	Breadwinners	Ketta, Fish Head, Old Duck Wife, Peppers, Aunt Lulu, Giant Fire-Breathing Baby Chick, Female Customer, Baby Turtle, Robo Toilet, Computer Voice, Christiana Snapperjaws, Home Shopping Announcer		
2014–2017	Penn Zero: Part-Time Hero	Bowling Ball	2 episodes	
2014–2020	Doc McStuffins	Maya McStuffins, various voices	Recurring role	
2015–2016	Pig Goat Banana Cricket	Ashley, Madison, Eve Gruntfest, Miss Smileybells, Kid, Baby Doll, Waitress, Kid #2, Ranger Mom, Sissy Salad, Tofu Jones, Wheat Germ, Ziti Godmother, Cherubs, Female Cop		
2015–2017	Uncle Grandpa	Emily, Snotty Camper	Episode: "Weird Badge"	
2015–2017	Harvey Beaks	Various voices		
2015	The Adventures of Puss in Boots	Malaranea, Red Sheevrah	also specials	
2015	Be Cool, Scooby-Doo!	Frida, Heidi Ho, Katie the Girlfriend, Edith, Mother, Daughter, Vandergrauff		
2015	The Mr. Peabody & Sherman Show	Annie Oakley, Ada Lovelace, Queen Hatshepsut, Lucy Walker		
2015	Sofia the First	Wendell's Mother	Episode: "Minimus is Missing"	
2015	Miles from Tomorrowland	Concierge Bot, Chef Bots		
2015–2018	Avengers Assemble	Wasp / Hope Pym, Proxima Midnight, Korbinite Mom, World Leader, Pleasant Automated Voice		
2015–2019	Star vs. the Forces of Evil	Little Girl, Grand Piano Woman, Lady Scarfs-a-Lot, Baby Meteora, Various characters		
2015-2021	Teen Titans Go!	Whimsy Raven, Zatanna	5 episodes	
2016–present	The Loud House	Mrs. Carmichael, various voices		
2016–2017	The Fairly OddParents	Chloe Carmichael	Season 10	
2016–2017	Voltron: Legendary Defender	Luca, Queen Luxia, Swirn, Ven'tar, Fentress		
2016–2018	The Lion Guard	Muhimu, Young Rhino		
2016–2018	Bunnicula	Mina Monroe, various voices		
2016–2019	Guardians of the Galaxy	Proxima Midnight, Hela		
2016–2019	Ben 10	Mel Malachi, Birdie, Lucky Girl, Queen Griefenstein, Quinn		
2017–2020	Dorothy and the Wizard of Oz	Dorothy Gale, Queen Ozma		
2017	Samurai Jack	Ami, Aki, additional voices	2 episodes	
2017	Spirit Riding Free	Aunt Cora, Townsperson, Polly Prescott	Netflix series	
2017	Elena of Avalor	Bijoux	Episode: "Party of a Lifetime"	
2017–2018	Bunsen Is a Beast	Amanda Killman, Mikey's Mom, Sophie Sanders, Beverly, Mrs. Munroe, additional voices		
2017–2018	Transformers: Titans Return	Victorion		
2017–2019	Niko and the Sword of Light	Lyra, Balatha, Doris, Poofhilda, Melange, Mrs. Funkfang, Townie, Well-Wishing Well	Amazon series	
2017–2019	OK K.O.! Let's Be Heroes	Shannon, Vormulax, Holo-Jane, various voices		
2017–2021	DuckTales	Roxanne Featherly, various voices	Recurring role	
2017–2021	Vampirina	Aunt Olga, Nosy, Drake's Mom, Spider, Mrs. Zombies, Human Guest 2, Ghastly Gayle	Recurring role	
2018	The Adventures of Kid Danger	Rude Woman, Squeezed Lady, Woman in Theater, Girl #1, Computer Voice, Obnoxious Teen Girl, Elderly Woman, Woman, Boat Witch #1, Witches, Mrs. Mouse, Little Boy, Mom, Snooze Pods, Alarm	Recurring role	
2018	Transformers: Power of the Primes	Victorion		
2018	The Adventures of Rocky and Bullwinkle	Grandwinkle, Female Poke Customer		
2018	Spider-Man	Lady Octopus / Carolyn Trainer, Student	Episode: "Between an Ock and a Hard Place"	
2018–2019	Trolls: The Beat Goes On!	Bridget, Bernice, Bella Brightly, Harper, Mags Gumdrop, Old Lady Bergen, Smarge, Ripley Crisp, Vega Swift, Dare-lene J. McGuffin, Various characters	Recurring role	
2018–2020	The Boss Baby: Back in Business	Mrs. Buskie, Marsha Krinkle, Baby Simmons, Worker Baby Simmons, R&D Baby Simmons, Security Baby Katja		
2018–2021	Big Hero 6: The Series	Brooke, Weird Little Boy, Little Girl, Security System, Elderly Female Artist, Kid, Soft Computer Voice, Lily, Hyper-Potamus, Child, GPS Voice		
2019–2021	Carmen Sandiego	Tigress/Sheena, additional voices	Netflix series	
2019–2021	DC Super Hero Girls	Zatanna, Star Sapphire, Tommy, Alura Zor-El		
2019–2021	Scooby-Doo and Guess Who?	Business Woman, Manager, Trainer, Anchorwoman, Meghan, City Official, Astronaut, Bobby, Ester Moonkiller, Gemma, Tammy	Recurring role	
2019–2021	Archibald's Next Big Thing	Bea, Murph, Seagull Kid, Goose Mother, Cheryl, Me-Maw Powers, Robot 1, Martha Von Gobblesberg, Steph, Aunt Violet, Aunt Beatrice, Director, Luna, Tanya, Owl Ophelia, Feta, Ms. Blue, Meemaw, Grandma Ashley, Little Pig Girl, Old Cat Lady, Bank Manager, Glow Worms, Water Skipper Bellhop		
2019–2020	The Rocketeer	Harley, Ms. Snootsmith, Pilot, Baby Carrot Mom, Repairwoman	Recurring role	
2019–2022	Amphibia	Martha, The Computer, Professor Scalini, Lady Franklin, Distressed Townspeople, additional voices	Recurring role	
2019–2022	Green Eggs and Ham	Do-Gooder, Inventor #3, Female Passerby 2, Kid Ant, Fa Ma		
2020–2021	Infinity Train	Sinesta Gillicutty, Bree Trundleshank, Girl Quadruplets, Disco Girlfriend, Punk Girlfriend, Earthy Girlfriend, Parka Denizen 1, Parka Denizen 2, Teen Fan		
2020–2021	Cleopatra in Space	Bobbi, Terawat, Urteko, Callie, Lakshmi, Yosira, Marigold Heads, Phoebus, Marigold Heads, Pothina	Peacock series	
2020–2022	It's Pony	Hypnotist, Tour Guide, News Reporter, Pet Psychologist, Customers, Bus Driver, Waiter, Mrs. Pinkerton, Mrs. Murray, Mom on Street, Millie, Phyllis, Nurse		
2020, 2022	The Casagrandes	Greta, Party Kid #3	2 episodes	
2020–2025	Craig of the Creek	Paula, Kylie	3 episodes	
2020–2025	Solar Opposites	Mrs. Frankie, various characters	29 episodes	
2020–2023	The Owl House	Amber, Eberwolf, Various characters	Recurring role	
2020–2023	Animaniacs	Teen Employee, Marsha, Brilly Brumley, Sheila, Lickspittle, Glowing Eyes, Kelly Sue, Mom, Teenager #2, Athena, Audience Member, Narrator, Tourist, Kid #1, Stapler, Teenage Butterfly, Kid, May the Mayfly, Woman, Marla, Phoenicia, Symphony B	Recurring role	
2020–2023	Looney Tunes Cartoons	Various voices	Recurring role	
2021–22	Dota: Dragon's Blood	Luna, various voices	Netflix series	
2021–present	Spidey and His Amazing Friends	Helen Stacy, additional voices	Recurring role	
2021–24	What If...?	Melina Vostokoff, Carina, Additional Voices	7 episodes	
2021–23	The Ghost and Molly McGee	Barrister Ghost #4, Dog Ghost, Grimbella		
2021	A Tale Dark & Grimm	The Sun, Old Woman, Olivia		
2022–present	We Baby Bears	Fairies		
2022	Ice Age: Scrat Tales	Baby Scrat	Disney+ series	
2022–2023	Oddballs	Toasty	Netflix series	
2022–2023	Transformers: EarthSpark	Agent Croft	Recurring role	
2022–present	The Wingfeather Saga	The Stonekeeper	Angel Studios series	
2023–2024	Velma	Evelyn, Paramedic, Seductive Woman	HBO Max series	
2023–present	My Adventures with Superman	Martha Kent, Young Clark Kent, Elderly Shopkeeper	3 episodes	
2023–present	Pupstruction	Scratch, Mrs. Wagner, Dr. Barkley, Professor Frazzle	Recurring role	
2023–present	SuperKitties	Granny Caterina, Ms. Poochytail, Magda	Recurring role	
2023–2025	Tiny Toons Looniversity	Lola Bunny, B'shara Bunny	Recurring role	
2023–2025	Moon Girl and Devil Dinosaur	Stiletto	2 episodes	
2023	Invincible	Caitlin, Denise, Mrs. Farnsley, Announcer	2 episodes	
2023	The Bad Guys: A Very Bad Holiday	DJ Trudy Tude, Holiday Shopper	Netflix TV special	
2023	My Dad the Bounty Hunter	Lootbat, KRS, Mike		
2024	Rock Paper Scissors	Ooze Queen, Ooze Lady, Waitress		
2024	X-Men '97	Rose Gilberti, Young Sebastion Gilberti	Episode: "Tolerance is Extinction – Part 1"	
2024	Angry Birds Mystery Island	Various voices		
2024	WondLa	Various voices		
2024	Batman: Caped Crusader	Maggie Cain, Guard, Secretary	2 episodes	
2024	Tomb Raider: The Legend of Lara Croft	Rescued Children	Episode: "A Set of Lies Agreed Upon"	
2024	Creature Commandos	College Student	Episode: "The Iron Pot"	
2024	Barbie Mysteries: The Great Horse Chase	Ticket Taker, Security Guard #2		
2024–2025	Blood of Zeus	Melinoë	3 episodes	
2025	Your Friendly Neighborhood Spider-Man	May Parker, Roxanna	10 episodes	
2025	Devil May Cry	Eva, Echidna, Demon Girl		
2025	Marvel Zombies	Melina Vostokoff	1 episode	
2025	Splinter Cell: Deathwatch	Diana Shetland		
2025	Bat-Fam	Ms. Trudeaux	Episode: "The Art of Claire"	

=== Feature film ===
List of voice performances in feature films
Year	Title	Role	Notes	Ref(s)
2004	Steamboy	Scarlett		
2006	The Wild	Baby Hippo	Grouped under Walla	
2007	Shrek the Third	Old Woman		
2008	Bolt	Mindy		
2009	Aliens in the Attic	Razor		
2010	Tangled	Additional voices		
2012	Tangled Ever After	Queen Arianna	Short film	
2012	Paperman	Meg	Academy Award-winning short film	
2014	Planes: Fire & Rescue	Patch		
2014	Tinker Bell and the Legend of the NeverBeast	Robin		
2015	Hotel Transylvania 2	Additional voices		
2015	The Laws of the Universe Part 0	Anna	Limited theatrical release	
2017	The Nut Job 2: Nutty by Nature	Jamie		
2018	Fate/stay night: Heaven's Feel I. presage flower	Saber	Aniplex of America theatrical release	
2018	Hotel Transylvania 3: Summer Vacation	Additional voices		
2019	Promare	Lucia Fex	Limited theatrical release	
2019	Frozen II	Additional voices		
2020	Onward	Additional voices		
2021	Poupelle of Chimney Town	Dorothy		
2021	Beebo Saves Christmas	Children		
2022	Luck	Hazel's mom, Aine		
2024	Ghost Cat Anzu	Hag, Mrs. Tsurumaki		
2026	Swapped	Nurse Javan, Female Pookoo		
2027	Ice Age: Boiling Point	Baby Scrat		

=== Direct-to-video and television films ===
List of voice performances in direct-to-video and television films
Year	Title	Role	Notes	Ref(s)
2002	WXIII: Patlabor the Movie 3	Saeko Misaki		
2003	Cardcaptor Sakura Movie 2: The Sealed Card	Sakura Kinomoto		
2004	Galerians: Rion	Lilia, Elsa Steiner	as Jennifer Jean	
2004	Mobile Suit Gundam F91	Annamarie Bourget	as Jennifer Jean	
2007	Naruto the Movie: Ninja Clash in the Land of Snow	Koyuki Kazahana, Yukie Fujikaze		
2007	Billy & Mandy: Wrath of the Spider Queen	Velma Green the Spider Queen		
2008	Naruto the Movie 2: Legend of the Stone of Gelel	Fugai	Grouped under Cast	
2008	The Little Mermaid: Ariel's Beginning	Attina		
2008	Strait Jacket	Rachel Hammond		
2009	Virtuality	Jean the Computer	Television pilot	
2009	Aussie and Ted's Great Adventure	Cricket	Live-action animal	
2009	Hulk Vs Thor	Enchantress		
2011	Dead Space: Aftermath	Rin, Sandra Burns		
2011	Pixie Hollow Games	Ivy		
2011	The Disappearance of Haruhi Suzumiya	Tsuruya-san, Kyon's Little Sister		
2012	Tinker Bell and the Secret of the Wings	Receptionist		
2013	Iron Man: Rise of Technovore	Maria Hill		
2013	Metal Gear Solid 2: Bande Dessinée	Rosemary	Digital graphic novel released as DVD Video	
2013	Tiger and Bunny: The Beginning	Karina Lyle / Blue Rose		
2014	Avengers Confidential: Black Widow and Punisher	Maria Hill		
2014	The Pirate Fairy	Sweetpea, Sydney		
2014	Son of Batman	Rebecca Langstrom		
2015	Lego DC Comics Super Heroes: Justice League vs. Bizarro League	Wonder Woman, Bizarra	Grouped under "Starring the Voice Talents of"	
2015	Tiger and Bunny: The Rising	Karina Lyle / Blue Rose		
2015	Justice League: Gods and Monsters	Karen Beecher, Livewire		
2015	Kung Fu Panda: Secrets of the Scroll	Tigress	Short film	
2016	Batman: Bad Blood	Ms. Bannister, Kori / Starfire		
2016	Lego DC Comics Super Heroes: Justice League: Cosmic Clash	Saturn Girl, Ugh		
2016	Justice League vs. Teen Titans	Starfire		
2016	Batman: The Killing Joke	Call Girl		
2017	Scooby-Doo! Shaggy's Showdown	Midge Gunderson		
2017	Teen Titans: The Judas Contract	Starfire		
2019	DC Showcase: Death	Charlotte		
2021	Scooby-Doo! The Sword and the Scoob	Female Peasant		
2021	Rick + Morty in the Eternal Nightmare Machine	Jessica	Short film	
2021	Fate/Grand Order The Movie: Divine Realm of the Round Table: Camelot Wandering; Agateram	The Lion King		
2023	Justice League: Warworld	Kara Zor-El / Harbinger, Cinnamon, Lana Lang		
2024	Watchmen Chapter 1	Janey Slater, Female Knot Top, Female Citizen #1		
2024	Watchmen Chapter 2	Sylvia Kovacs, Female Knot Top		
2025	A Chuck E. Cheese Christmas	Helen Henny, Mrs. Claus, Elf #2		

=== Direct-to-streaming films ===
List of voice performances in direct-to-streaming films
Year	Title	Role	Notes	Ref(s)
2018	The Christmas Chronicles	Jojo		
2019	Curious George: Royal Monkey	Jester, Guard #2, Director		
2020	The Christmas Chronicles 2	Jojo		
2021	My Little Pony: A New Generation	Pegasus Fan		
2024	Saving Bikini Bottom: The Sandy Cheeks Movie	SeaPals Kid		
2025	Fixed	Honey's Mom		

=== Web series ===
List of voice performances in web series
Year	Title	Role	Notes	Ref(s)
2026	Chuck E. Cheese Minisodes	Helen Henny		

=== Video games ===
List of voice performances in video games
Year	Title	Role	Notes	Ref(s)
2003	Xenosaga Episode I: Der Wille zur Macht		Uncredited (Note: For some reason, the closing credits of this video game did not list the voice actors involved.)	
2003	Buffy the Vampire Slayer: Chaos Bleeds	Willow Rosenberg	First voice-over role in video games	
2003	Fatal Frame II: Crimson Butterfly	Mio Amakura	Grouped under Voice Talent	
2004	Tales of Symphonia	Raine Sage		
2004	Halo 2 (I Love Bees promotional edition)	Janissary "Jan" James		
2004	Lemony Snicket's A Series of Unfortunate Events	White-Faced Jane		
2005	Xenosaga Episode II: Jenseits von Gut und Böse	Febronia, Pellegri		
2005	Tekken 5	Jane, boy in Bruce Irvin's ending		
2005	Devil May Cry 3: Dante's Awakening	Lady	Uncredited (Note: This game only credited the motion capture actors, not their corresponding voice actors)	Facebook
2005	SWAT 4	Dispatch, 911 Operator, TV Reporter, Female Hostage 2		
2005	Hot Shots Golf: Open Tee		Grouped under Voice Actors; Also Hot Shots Golf: Open Tee 2	
2005	Star Wars: Episode III – Revenge of the Sith	Serra Keto		
2005	James Bond 007: From Russia with Love	Tatiana Romanova		
2006	Samurai Champloo: Sidetracked	Fuu Kasumi	as Kay Jensen	
2006	Dirge of Cerberus: Final Fantasy VII	Shelke Rui		
2006	Xenosaga Episode III: Also sprach Zarathustra	Febronia, Pellegri, 100-Series Realian		
2006	Open Season	Beth, Giselle	Grouped under Voice Talent	
2006	Justice League Heroes	Zatanna		
2006	Tokobot Plus: Mysteries of the Karakuri	Ruby, Aria		
2006	.hack//G.U. vol. 1//Rebirth	Shino, Kaede		
2006	Star Wars: Empire at War: Forces of Corruption	Silri		
2006	Guild Wars Nightfall	Tahlkora	Grouped under Voice Actors	
2006	Final Fantasy XII	Ashe		
2006	Dead or Alive Xtreme 2	Kasumi, Niki		
2006	Metal Gear Solid: Portable Ops	Teliko Friedman		
2007	Rogue Galaxy	Lilika		
2007	Armored Core 4	Fiona		
2007	Spider-Man 3	Mary Jane Watson		
2007	.hack//G.U. vol. 2//Reminisce	Kaede		
2007	The Darkness	Young Jenny Romano		
2007	Project Sylpheed	Ellen Bernstein		
2007	Jeanne d'Arc	Jeanne d'Arc		
2007	Guild Wars: Eye of the North	Gwen		
2007	.hack//G.U. vol. 3//Redemption	Shino, Kaede		
2007	Final Fantasy Tactics: The War of the Lions	Ovelia Atkascha		
2008	Emergency Heroes	Kelly		
2008	No More Heroes	Jeane		
2008	Ninja Gaiden II	Irene Lew/Sonia		
2008	Metal Gear Solid 4: Guns of the Patriots	Enemy Soldiers		
2008	Too Human	Nyanna		
2008	Valkyria Chronicles	Irene Ellet		
2008	Star Wars: The Force Unleashed	Darth Phobos		
2008	SpongeBob SquarePants Featuring Nicktoons: Globs of Doom	Jeera		
2008	Tak and the Guardians of Gross	Jeera		
2008	Prince of Persia	Elika		
2009	Afro Samurai	Young Afro Samurai		
2009	Red Faction: Guerrilla	Samanya		
2009	Prototype	Elizabeth Greene, The Mother, miscellaneous voices		
2009	Ninja Gaiden Sigma 2	Irene Lew/Sonia		
2009	Brütal Legend	Dominatrices		
2009	Ben 10 Alien Force: Vilgax Attacks	Charmcaster		
2009	Resident Evil: The Darkside Chronicles	Others		
2009	The Saboteur	Skylar St. Claire		
2009	Ratchet & Clank Future: A Crack In Time	Carina		
2010	White Knight Chronicles	Princess Cisna		
2010	BioShock 2	Barbara Johnson		
2010	Final Fantasy XIII	Cocoon Inhabitants		
2010	Resonance of Fate	Cochet		
2010	Dead or Alive Paradise	Kasumi, Niki		
2010	Lost Planet 2	Additional voices		
2010	Transformers: War for Cybertron	Arcee		
2010	Singularity	Kathryn Norvikova		
2010	Final Fantasy XIV	Cast		
2010	Vanquish	Elena Ivanova		
2010	Tron: Evolution	Radia		
2010	Ben 10 Alien Force: The Rise of Hex	Charmcaster		
2011	Marvel vs. Capcom 3: Fate of Two Worlds	Jill Valentine	Grouped under Voice Talent	
2011	Dead or Alive: Dimensions	Kasumi, Kasumi Alpha, Ayame		
2011	White Knight Chronicles II	Queen Cisna		
2011	X-Men: Destiny	Emma Frost		
2011	Spider-Man: Edge of Time	Overdrive		
2011	Ace Combat: Assault Horizon	Janice Rehl	Also performance capture	
2011	Batman: Arkham City	League of Assassins Members, Vicki Vale (Revenge)	Grouped under Voice Over Actors; Also in Harley Quinn's Revenge expansion pack	
2011	The Elder Scrolls V: Skyrim	Vex		
2011	Saints Row: The Third	Pedestrian and Character Voices		
2011	Resistance 3	Susan Capelli		
2011	Ultimate Marvel vs. Capcom 3	Jill Valentine		
2011	Star Wars: The Old Republic	Jedi Knight Female		
2012	Asura's Wrath	Mithra		
2012	Naruto Shippuden: Ultimate Ninja Storm Generations	Tayuya		
2012	Kid Icarus: Uprising	Gaol, Phosphora		
2012	Kinect Star Wars	Intercom, PC Female Pilot, pad1		
2012	The Amazing Spider-Man	Gwen Stacy		
2012	Wipeout 3	Shawn Crest, Sweet Lady Singalot, Emily Smith		
2012	The Secret World	Kirsten Geary, Tanis		
2012	Infex	Ivy	Interactive graphic novel	
2012	Kingdom Hearts 3D: Dream Drop Distance	The Grid	Grouped under "Featuring the Disney Character voice talents of"	
2012	Guild Wars 2	Caithe	Grouped under Voice Talent	
2012	Halo 4	Ivanoff, System Voice		
2013	Metal Gear Rising: Revengeance	Courtney Collins	Nominated – 2013 BTVA Voice Acting Award	
2013	Naruto Shippuden: Ultimate Ninja Storm 3	Fuu		
2013	Marvel Heroes	Emma Frost, Boom-Boom, Clea		
2013	The Last of Us	Voice Over Cast		
2013	The Wonderful 101	Wonder-Green		
2013	Skylanders: Swap Force	Tessa	Grouped under Voice Talent	
2013	Wipeout: Create and Crash	Emily Smith, Shawn Crest, Ben N. Space		
2013	Lego Marvel Super Heroes	Aunt May, Emma Frost, Gwen Stacy	Grouped as VO Talent	
2013	République	257-P		
2014	Naruto Shippuden: Ultimate Ninja Storm Revolution	Fuu		
2014	Skylanders: Trap Team	Tessa	Grouped under Voice Actors	
2014	Lego Batman 3: Beyond Gotham	Supergirl, Black Canary, Hawkgirl, Indigo-1, Wonder Girl, and Zatanna		
2015	Code Name: S.T.E.A.M.	Tiger Lily, Victoria, Ozma		
2015	Skylanders: SuperChargers	Tessa	Grouped under Voice Actors; Reprising roles (Note: Skylanders roles are reprising for later releases.)	
2015	Halo 5: Guardians	System Voice		
2015	Fallout 4	Proctor Ingram		
2016	Naruto Shippuden: Ultimate Ninja Storm 4	Hanabi Hyuga, Fuu		
2016	King's Quest – Chapter III: Once Upon A Climb	Princess Vee, Bramble Fey		
2016	Master of Orion: Conquer the Stars	Human Advisor, GNN Anchor		
2016	Minecraft: Story Mode	Mevia, Val		
2016	World of Final Fantasy	Shelke Rui		
2016	Final Fantasy XV	Aranea Highwind		
2017	Injustice 2	Starfire		
2017	Batman: The Enemy Within	Agency Female, Civilian, Lauren, Newscaster		
2018	Lego DC Super-Villains	English Voice Talent		
2018	OK K.O.! Let's Play Heroes	Shannon, Vormulax		
2018	Overkill's The Walking Dead	Heather Campbell		
2019	Mortal Kombat 11	Kitana, Mileena	Credited under English Voice Talent	
2019	Bloodstained: Ritual of the Night	Gremory, Lindsay Blair		
2019	Marvel Ultimate Alliance 3: The Black Order	Elsa Bloodstone, Proxima Midnight, Wasp, Invisible Woman		
2019	Steven Universe: Unleash the Light	Pyrope		
2020	The Last of Us Part II	WLF Militia		
2020	Legends of Runeterra	Anivia		
2020	Cyberpunk 2077	Evelyn Parker		
2021	DC Super Hero Girls: Teen Power	Zatanna / Zee Zatara, Star Sapphire / Carol Ferris		
2021	Psychonauts 2	Watermelon, Enabler		
2021	Halo Infinite	CIRC		
2022	Ghostbusters: Spirits Unleashed	Ghostbusters		
2022	Gotham Knights	Harley Quinn		
2023	Mortal Kombat 1	Kitana, Mileena		
2023	Mortal Kombat: Onslaught	Kitana		
2024	Shin Megami Tensei V: Vengeance	Naamah	Canon of Vengeance	In-game credits
2024	Arknights	Civilight Eterna	Absolved Will Be the Seekers	
2025	Date Everything!	Wyndolyn		
2025	Dune Awakening	Ranya Sorvane		

== Live-action filmography ==
=== Television ===
List of acting appearances on television
Year	Title	Role	Notes	Ref(s)
2010–11	Wizards of Waverly Place	Helen	2 episodes	
2012	Criminal Minds	Rena Tracey	Episode: "Magnificent Light"	
2017	Nicky, Ricky, Dicky & Dawn	YOCO	Episode: "YOCO"	
2019	Supergirl	Hope (voice)	2 episodes	
2025	Georgie and Mandy's First Marriage	Heather	Episode: "Baby Fight"	

=== Film ===
List of acting appearances on film
Year	Title	Role	Notes	Ref(s)
2003	Neverland	Tinker Bell	Feature film	
2008	Adventures in Voice Acting	Herself	Documentary film on voice acting	
2013	I Know That Voice	Herself	Documentary film on voice acting	
2017	Girl #2		Writer, Executive Producer; Short film, festival release	

=== Other appearances ===
- Swiffer TV commercial – Mud Girl for Swiffer WetJet
- TableTop web series – Herself (season 2, episode 8)
