= List of Tiger & Bunny episodes =

Cover for the first volume of the Blu-ray release by Bandai Visual, featuring Kotestu Kaburagi (left) and Barnaby Brooks (right).

Tiger & Bunny (タイガー&バニー, Taigā Ando Banī) is an anime television series produced by Sunrise and directed by Keiichi Satou. The screenplay was written by Masafumi Nishida, with original character design by Masakazu Katsura. It is set in a futuristic city where heroes fight crime whilst promoting real life sponsors, focusing on two superheroes, the old-fashioned Kotetsu T. "Wild Tiger" Kaburagi and the rookie hero Barnaby "Bunny" Brooks Jr., as they are forced by their employers to work together.

The series aired on Tokyo MX between April 3, 2011, and September 18, 2011, also receiving simulcasts by Viz Media on Hulu and Anime News Network. An English-language version by Viz Media began broadcasting on the Neon Alley video service from October 2, 2012. A film adaptation, Tiger & Bunny: The Beginning, was released on September 22, 2012.

On March 30, 2019, Nikkan Sports announced that a sequel to the original Tiger & Bunny series is currently in production. On April 2, 2020, the sequel was announced as Tiger & Bunny 2. Voice actors Hiroaki Hirata and Masakazu Morita are returning to voice their respective characters. The anime is being produced by studio BN Pictures, with director Mitsuko Kase replacing director Keiichi Satou. The character designs will be created by manga artist Masakazu Katsura. The sequel will also have 25 episodes, split into two cours. Its first 13 episodes premiered on April 8, 2022, on Netflix.

The series uses two pieces of opening theme music and two pieces of ending music. For episode one to thirteen, the opening is "Orion o Nazoru" (オリオンをなぞる; lit. Tracing Orion) by Unison Square Garden and the ending is "Hoshi no Sumika" (星のすみか; lit. Abode of Stars) by Aobozu. From episode fourteen onwards, the opening is "Missing Link" by Novels and the ending is "Mind Game" by Tamaki. For the first movie, the opening theme is "Earth Diver" (アースダイバー, Āsu Daibā) by Novels whilst the ending theme is Linear Blue o Kiki Nagara (リニアブルーを聴きながら, Rinia Burū o Kiki Nagara; lit. Whilst Listening to the Linear Blue) by Unison Square Garden. For the second movie the opening theme is "Nemesis" by Novels whilst the ending theme is "Harmonized Finale" by Unison Square Garden.

== Series overview ==
Season	Episodes		Originally released		
Season	Episodes		First released	Last released	Network
1	25		April 3, 2011	September 18, 2011	BS11, MBS, Tokyo MX
2	25	13	April 8, 2022		Netflix
2	25	12	October 7, 2022		Netflix

== Episode list ==
=== Season 1 (2011) ===
No. overall	No. in season	Title	Original release date	English air date
1	1	"All's Well That Ends Well."; Transliteration: "Owari Yokereba Subete Yoshi" (Japanese: 終わりよければすべてよし)	April 3, 2011	October 2, 2012
The city of Stern Bild is protected by a group of super-powered individuals known as the NEXT (Noted Entities with eXtraordinary Talents), who also vie for popularity on the Hero TV network. One of them is Kotetsu "Wild Tiger" Kaburagi who is considered past his prime, especially after the arrival of Barnaby "Bunny" Brooks Jr., a rookie hero who possesses the same power he has. When his sponsor company is taken over, Kotetsu is forced to work under the supervision of Alexander Lloyds, adopt a new and improved look and form a reluctant partnership with Barnaby.
2	2	"A Good Beginning Makes A Good Ending."; Transliteration: "Hajime ga Kanjin" (Japanese: はじめが肝心)	April 10, 2011	October 12, 2012
A giant stone statue runs rampant across the city, but Kotetsu and Barnaby are at a disadvantage due to their reluctance to work together. Doc Saito, the company's head researcher, shows Kotetsu how durable his new suit is compared to the old one. The NEXT behind the statue attack, a young boy with telekinesis, later targets a high-level ice rink, where Kotetsu's daughter, Kaede Kaburagi, is performing. Barnaby rescues Kaede whilst Kotetsu, recalling how a NEXT called Mr. Legend inspired him to become a hero, manages to convince the boy to use his powers for good when the ice rink starts to collapse before dropping to the ground.
3	3	"Many a True Word is Spoken in Jest."; Transliteration: "Usokara deta Shinjitsu" (Japanese: 嘘から出た真実)	April 17, 2011	October 19, 2012
Hero TV films a documentary about Barnaby. Much to Kotetsu's dismay, he is forced to follow on camera orders from Hero TV's producer, Agnes Joubert. While visiting a newly inaugurated building, the duo learn a bomb has been planted within the building. Under suspicion that a repairman there claimed to be running maintenance check on an elevator, Kotetsu finds the bomb in the air vent, but Barnaby is unable to disarm it on time. Instinctively, Kotetsu manages to convince Barnaby to combine their powers to allow the bomb to safely detonate high above the building.
4	4	"Fear is Often Greater Than the Danger."; Transliteration: "Anzuru yori Umu ga Yasushi" (Japanese: 案ずるより産むが易し)	April 24, 2011	October 26, 2012
Following a slip up during a mission, Karina "Blue Rose" Lyle struggles with the unrewarding nature of a hero and decides to quit to fulfill her original dream of being a singer. While speaking to Kotetsu, he reveals his motivation as a hero for saving people with disregard for recognition. Later, Karina performs a gig at a bar, ignoring a rescue mission at a burning oil rig. However, after hearing the jeers of some drunken customers against the heroes struggling at the scene, Karina realizes Kotetsu's words and goes into action in time to save the other heroes.
5	5	"Go For Broke!"; Transliteration: "Atatte Kudakero!" (Japanese: 当たって砕けろ!)	May 1, 2011	November 2, 2012
One day before his birthday, Barnaby expresses his anger towards Kotetsu after their company has to pay for the collateral damage he has caused. Kotetsu, misunderstanding the reason for Barnaby's frustration, organizes a surprise birthday party for him with the other heroes. However, their plan to surprise Barnaby by pretending to be thieves goes awry when a real thief named Pauly, a NEXT that can turn his skin into diamond, steals a priceless diamond. Kotetsu and Barnaby have trouble getting through Pauly's diamond skin, but a special "good luck mode" added by Saito to their suit activates in their last second of power, allowing them to break through it. Saito later reveals that the feature is purely cosmetic, and it was their team work that defeated Pauly.
6	6	"Fire is a Good Servant, but a Bad Master."; Transliteration: "Hi wa Jūjun na Shimobe daga, Ashiki Shujin demo aru" (Japanese: 火は従順なしもべだが、悪しき主人でもある)	May 8, 2011	November 9, 2012
The criminals that Barnaby arrested on his first case are killed in prison by a mysterious blue flame, with Nathan "Fire Emblem" Seymore as the prime suspect. Kotetsu is dragged to the prison to help provide data, where he and Nathan witness another inmate being killed by the strange flame. Meanwhile, Barnaby investigates the mark of the Ouroboros that was worn by the murderer of his parents. Later, Kotetsu and Nathan are attacked by a mech armed with a powerful flamethrower. Although its controller escapes, Kotetsu recognizes the culprit as the same repairman who planted the elevator bomb. Barnaby deduces that the bomber plans to kill anyone who saw his face at the scene, which includes Agnes. The heroes manage to save her and corner the culprit. Barnaby spots the Ouroboros mark on his neck, but the wielder of the blue flame, a mysterious NEXT, suddenly appears and kills the man.
7	7	"The Wolf Knows What the Ill Beast Thinks."; Transliteration: "Hebi no Michi wa Hebi" (Japanese: 蛇の道は蛇)	May 15, 2011	November 16, 2012
Barnaby tells Kotetsu and Nathan about the Ouroboros syndicate who killed his parents, frustrated that he has lost another lead. Nathan theorizes that the mysterious flame-wielding NEXT is killing members of Ouroboros to keep them quiet. With Barnaby not answering his calls, Kotetsu is temporarily paired up with Karina to stop a hostage situation. Afterward, the heroes are asked to head into a crime syndicate's hideout at a church, but just as they are about to make their move, the mysterious NEXT attacks the hideout. As the other heroes unsuccessfully try to save as many criminals as they can, Barnaby pursues the NEXT, who identifies himself as "Lunatic", preaching his own type of justice.
8	8	"There is Always a Next Time."; Transliteration: "Kanarazu Kikai ga Kuru" (Japanese: 必ず機会が来る)	May 22, 2011	November 23, 2012
As Lunatic continues to kill criminals, the public start to question the need for heroes. A public relations campaign is launched, with Kotetsu and Barnaby visiting Hero Academy alongside Ivan "Origami Cyclone" Karelin, who has a lot of self-doubt about his worth as a hero. Ivan's closest friend and classmate, Edward, was the best student of Hero Academy, until he accidentally shot a hostage he was trying to save and was imprisoned on murder charges. Edward escapes from prison and attacks Ivan, blaming him for hesitating to back him up during the incident, but Kotetsu rescues Ivan and encourages him to stop Edward. Ivan confronts Edward, who is attacked by Lunatic, whose targets are that of murders, not members of Ouroboros. Kotetsu and Barnaby soon arrive on the scene to fight Lunatic. Kotetsu, although injured in the attack, manages to break part of Lunatic's mask, forcing him to flee. After Edward is put back into police custody, Ivan vows to move out of the background, whilst Barnaby wonders why Kotetsu does so much for him. At the end of the episode, it is revealed that Lunatic is Yuri Petrov, Stern Bild's judge.
9	9	"Spare the Rod and Spoil the Child."; Transliteration: "Kawaii Ko ni wa Tabi o Saseyo" (Japanese: かわいい子には旅をさせよ)	May 29, 2011	November 30, 2012
The heroes are tasked to keep guard on the mayor's baby, a NEXT with strong telekinectic powers who soon becomes attached to Huang "Dragon Kid" Pao-Lin. Pao-Lin and the baby stay for the night at Barnaby's house, where Barnaby shares with Kotetsu his findings regarding Ouroboros, the criminal organization involved with his parents' death. The next day, the duo find that Pao-Lin and the child were kidnapped by a trio of NEXT criminal sisters, each with a smell based ability, who demand a one million ransom. With the baby's help, Pao-Lin manages to subdue the criminals, but the sight of Kotetsu holding one of the sisters' stun guns makes Barnaby remember the face of the man who killed his parents and he leaves the scene in a rush.
10	10	"The Calm Before the Storm."; Transliteration: "Arashi no Mae no Shizukesa" (Japanese: 嵐の前の静けさ)	June 5, 2011	December 7, 2012
Kotetsu is put on paid vacation and decides to go home to visit his family, purchasing a strange plushie known as a Mad Bear along the way. Meanwhile, Barnaby appears to have found the criminal responsible for his parents' murder, Jake Martinez. On his way home, Kotetsu encounters a terrorist bombing on a bridge, deciding to handle it alone so that Barnaby can investigate Jake. He soon finds the attackers are a group of mechs being piloted by living Mad Bears, with more bombings happening around the city. With the heroes overwhelmed, Barnaby decides to postpone his prison visit to assist Kotetsu. Just then, the culprits reveal themselves to be Ouroboros, placing the entire island city hostage and demanding the release of Jake in exchange.
11	11	"The Die is Cast."; Transliteration: "Sai wa Nagerareta" (Japanese: 賽は投げられた)	June 12, 2011	December 14, 2012
The higher ups discuss how to respond to Ouroboros' demands, while Barnaby is frustrated about losing his only lead yet again. As Ouroboros start to attack the columns supporting Stern Bild, Kotetsu and Barnaby go to see the mayor to convince him to prioritize the public's safety. When they are confronted by Hans Chuckman, a member of Ouroboros, the mayor agrees to release Jake, with Ivan transforming into Chuckman and taking his place to infiltrate Ouroboros. However, Jake refuses to release the hostages, instead choosing to keep them in his palm. In order to regain the public's trust, Hero TV's president, Albert Maverick, asks Barnaby to reveal his past to the public. Meanwhile, Ivan arrives at Jake's hideout, but is uncovered by Jake.
12	12	"Take Heed of the Snake in the Grass."; Transliteration: "Kusa no Naka ni Iru Hebi ni Yōjinseyo" (Japanese: 草の中にいる蛇に用心せよ)	June 19, 2011	December 21, 2012
Barnaby attempts to confront Jake, but he manages to escape when Kotetsu charges in, causing Barnaby to lose trust in him. Ivan, who had been forced to act as a decoy in the form of Chuckman, is recovered and sent to the hospital. Jake challenges the heroes in a series of one-on-one fights, promising to surrender if he loses, but blow up the city's support columns if he wins. The first two heroes, Keith "Sky High" Goodman and Antonio "Rock Bison" Lopez, are easily defeated by Jake's ability to produce barriers. As Ivan reveals to the higher ups that Kriem, another member of Ouroboros, is controlling the Mad Bears piloting the mechs, Kotetsu fights a one-sided battle against Jake and ends up seriously injured. Agnes manages to delay the next match until morning to give the higher ups time to set up a jamming signal for the mechs. As Barnaby prepares for his match, Jake announces he will destroy half the city if Barnaby loses.
13	13	"Confidence is a Plant of Slow Growth."; Transliteration: "Shinrai to Yūki wa Ōkiku naru no ga Osoi Ki de aru" (Japanese: 信頼という木は大きくなるのが遅い木である)	June 26, 2011	December 28, 2012
Despite his injuries, Kotetsu leaves the hospital to find Barnaby, who is faring badly against Jake. Kotetsu tells Barnaby he has figured out that Jake can read people's movements using super hearing as a second power, and gives him a sound grenade as a countermeasure. Although this grenade initially seems ineffective, it turns out to be a stun grenade, causing Jake to drop his guard and letting Barnaby defeat him. Kotetsu reveals that Jake's second power is actually in fact mind reading, proposing a fake plan to Barnaby in order to mislead Jake. Kriem threatens to blow up the city using the mechs, but they have been taken out of commission by Karina, Nathan and Pao-Lin in the meantime. Jake tries to escape, but when he shoots at Kotetsu, he hits Kriem's helicopter instead, causing it to crash on him. At the end of the episode, Barnaby addresses Kotetsu by name, a sign that he now trusts him as his partner.
14	14	"Love Is Blind."; Transliteration: "Koi wa Mōmoku" (Japanese: 恋は盲目)	July 3, 2011	January 4, 2013
Ten months after the Ouroboros incident, Kotetsu and Barnaby are a successful and popular superhero team. Barnaby has won last season's most valuable player and Kotetsu has climbed to fourth place in the rankings, while Antonio has fallen to last place. While rehearsing for a joint concert with the duo, Karina realizes she has feelings for Kotetsu. However, her classmates trying convincing her otherwise when she vaguely mentions this to them. At the concert, a NEXT backstage thief sneaks into Karina's dressing room and steals her bag, which has a towel given to Karina by Kotetsu to replace one he ruined with split coffee. After figuring out that the thief has the power of invisibility while he holds his breath, Kotetsu rushes after him, finding that his abilities have increased in power, but run out earlier than usual. As a result, the criminal is captured by Antonio, giving him a much needed career boost. Though Kotetsu tries explaining something happened to his powers, Barnaby and Karina think he is being modest, simply wanting to help out Antonio.
15	15	"The Sky's the Limit..."; Transliteration: "Genkai wa Sora Takaku ni..." (Japanese: 限界は空高くに...)	July 10, 2011	January 11, 2013
Having been overtaken by Barnaby in the rankings, Keith starts questioning his ability to protect the people. Whilst walking through the park, he comes across a strange girl named Cis, with whom he shares his worries. Karina, Nathan and Pao-Lin reach the conclusion he is in love and give him advice which falls flat. Meanwhile, Ben Jackson, Kotetsu's former boss and now a taxicab driver, grows concerned when he hears of Kotetsu's increasing powers. After Cis is picked up by a strange man, she goes out of control when she sees a billboard of Kotetsu and Barnaby, bringing the two into the fight. Cis is revealed to be an android built by the man, Dr. Rotwang, who worked for Barnaby's parents. As Kotetsu's power runs out early again, Keith, who has somehow been inspired by Cis, appears and manages to destroy the android, not realizing who it was due to Cis's human disguise burning off. Afterwards, Kotetsu is called by Ben, who tells him the changes in his power may mean it will soon disappear.
16	16	"Truth Lies at the Bottom of a Well."; Transliteration: "Shinjitsu wa Ido no Soko ni Aru" (Japanese: 真実は井戸の底にある)	July 17, 2011	January 18, 2013
After another encounter with Lunatic, Barnaby surpasses Mr. Legend's all time point record whilst Kotetsu notices his power's time limit is still decreasing. Barnaby tells Kotetsu about how Maverick took care of him following his parents' deaths. Meanwhile, Lunatic recalls how he killed his father, Mr. Legend, when he was beating his mother, who nevertheless still hates and fears him for it. Talking with Ben again, Kotetsu learns that Mr. Legend became an alcoholic after exhibiting the same power-degrading symptoms as him, resulting in Hero TV staging his arrests to preserve his image. Afterwards, Kotetsu encounters a criminal known as The Lady Killer, but is easily beaten when his powers run out, leaving the culprit at the mercy of Lunatic.
17	17	"Blood Is Thicker Than Water."; Transliteration: "Chi wa Mizu yori mo Koi" (Japanese: 血は水よりも濃い)	July 24, 2011	January 25, 2013
Kotetsu takes a paid vacation to visit his hometown and family. His mother Anju and older brother Muramasa soon realize that something is wrong with him and he has a hard time getting on his daughter Kaede's good side. While confessing to Muramasa that his powers are declining, Kotetsu reminisces about the promise he made to his late wife Tomoe to always be a hero, moments before she died. The next day, Kaede is trapped in a temple when a storm breaks out. Kotetsu uses his power, locating Kaede thanks to his sharpened hearing, and manages to rescue her even after his power runs out. Having reconciled with his daughter, Kotetsu decides to resign from being a hero and focus on his family. When Kaede bids him farewell, Kotetsu is surprised to find that she is a NEXT, seeing that she was running after the train using his powers.
18	18	"Ignorance Is Bliss."; Transliteration: "Shiranu ga Hotoke" (Japanese: 知らぬが仏)	July 31, 2011	February 1, 2013
As Kotetsu tries to work up the courage to announce he is retiring, Barnaby goes to see Kriem, who has awakened from a coma she was in since the Jake incident. She talks about how Jake saved her when she was ostracized by her friends and family for being a NEXT. Before committing suicide, she reveals that Jake was not the one who killed Barnaby's parents, as he was with her on the day they were killed. Barnaby goes into denial, saying he remembers his parents' death clearly, but some video research shows discrepancies between reality and Barnaby's memory. Upon this revelation, Barnaby's memory of the murderer's face keeps changing and he starts to doubt if he should continue being a hero, giving Kotetsu no room to tell him about his own intention to quit. Meanwhile, Kaede is trying to deal with her emerging NEXT power, the ability to copy the power of any NEXT she has touched, not realizing her father is a NEXT despite this revelation.
19	19	"There's No Way Out."; Transliteration: "Fukuro no Nezumi" (Japanese: 袋の鼠)	August 7, 2011	February 8, 2013
Kotetsu takes Barnaby to retrace his steps during the day his parents were murdered in an attempt to jog his memory. Along the way, he buys him and Barnaby matching commemorative pins. Barnaby overhears Kotetsu telling his mother on the phone he will quit being a hero and confronts him about it. Kotetsu tries to dissuade him in vain and Barnaby berates him, saying that he cannot afford to have a partner who cannot trust him before leaving. While confiding with Maverick, Barnaby receives a call from Samantha Taylor, his parents' housekeeper, who has found a photograph showing her with Barnaby on the day of the murder, instead of Maverick like he remembered. Maverick then confesses that he murdered Barnaby's parents when they discovered he was providing their robotic technology to Ouroboros in order to stage exciting arrests for the nascent Hero TV. He also reveals he is a NEXT with the ability to rewrite memories, which he had used to cover his tracks. Maverick then uses his power on Barnaby again.
20	20	"Full of Courtesy, Full of Craft."; Transliteration: "Kuchi ni Mitsu ari, Hari ni Ken ari" (Japanese: 口に蜜あり、腹に剣あり)	August 14, 2011	February 15, 2013
Maverick has rewritten Barnaby's memories, once again causing him to believe that his parents were murdered by Jake. Later he tries to rewrite Kotetsu's memory as well by tampering with his coffee, but is unable to due to Samantha calling Kotetsu regarding the photograph she had shown Barnaby. Maverick sets up a bomb explosion to distract Kotetsu and has Samantha kidnapped and later killed, destroying the photograph in the process. When Kotetsu starts getting close to the truth by finding Barnaby's pin in Maverick's office, Maverick decides to frame Kotetsu for Samantha's murder and overwrite the memories of everyone at Hero TV, by tampering with their wine, of Kotetsu being the NEXT known as Wild Tiger.
21	21	"Heaven Helps Those Who Help Themselves."; Transliteration: "Ten wa Mizukara Tasukurusha o Tasuku" (Japanese: 天は自ら助くる者を助く)	August 21, 2011	February 22, 2013
Kotetsu tries to understand what is going on whilst evading the heroes, while Yuri becomes suspicious when he finds that there are no files on Kotetsu and that all data about Wild Tiger has been blocked. Meanwhile, Kaede is told the truth about Kotetsu being Wild Tiger and decides to head towards Stern Bild. Kotetsu is cornered by Karina and he tries to prove his identity by telling her things only the two of them would know, but she distrusts him with the arrival of a fake Wild Tiger. However, it seems he was getting through to her beforehand, most likely because of her feelings for him. Yuri, believing in Kotetsu's innocence, appears as Lunatic and helps him escape. Kotetsu figures out that Maverick framed him and reunites with Ben, who gives him his old Wild Tiger suit. As Kaede reaches Stern Bild, she has a brief run-in with Maverick, unwittingly copying his power in the process. Donning his old suit, Kotetsu decides to call out the other heroes.
22	22	"Bad Luck Often Brings Good Luck."; Transliteration: "Ningen Banji Saiōgauma" (Japanese: 人間万事塞翁が馬)	August 28, 2011	March 1, 2013
Kotetsu tries to make the other heroes remember he is Wild Tiger by mentioning their secrets and personal habits, but none fully believe him. Kaede appears and uses Maverick's copied power to restore the memories of the other heroes. Kotetsu deduces and explains to the other heroes that Maverick is a memory-manipulating NEXT and the one responsible for framing him. Barnaby arrives on the scene, but Kaede fails to restore his memory because she was patted on the shoulder moments ago by Keith, replacing Maverick's power with his. Kotetsu dons his usual suit and lures Barnaby away to try and reawaken his memories some other way. Meanwhile, Maverick sends the fake Wild Tiger after the other heroes.
23	23	"Misfortunes Never Come Singly."; Transliteration: "Fukō wa Tandoku de wa Konai" (Japanese: 不幸は単独では来ない)	September 4, 2011	March 8, 2013
Kotetsu takes on Barnaby's attacks, trying to get him to remember him, eventually succeeding when he calls Barnaby by his hated nickname. As they head back towards Apollon Media with Saito and Ben, they learn that Maverick has taken Kaede and the other heroes hostage, holding them at Justice Tower. Upon arriving at the tower, they discover that the fake Wild Tiger is a robot called "H-01" created by Dr. Rotwang, working in cahoots with Maverick, who is planning to replace all the heroes with androids. Meanwhile, the rest of the heroes are trapped in cages with bombs attached to their necks. Dr. Rotwang informs them that only the first to deactivate his or her bomb will be spared, at the cost of the others' lives, with all of them being killed if none of them do so before Tiger and Barnaby are defeated by the robot.
24	24	"Nothing Ventured, Nothing Gained."; Transliteration: "Kotetsu ni Hairazunba Torako Oezu" (Japanese: 虎穴に入らずんば虎子を得ず)	September 11, 2011	March 15, 2013
As Kotetsu and Barnaby struggle against H-01 whilst waiting for their powers to recharge, Rotwang continues to stir up the heroes to try to make them sacrifice the others, hiding the fact that pressing the button on their collars will kill them all anyway. Although Kotetsu and Barnaby continue to struggle even when they activate their powers, Karina's faith in them helps calm the other heroes whilst Kaede, using Karina's powers, manages to stop Rotwang and rescue the heroes. Kotetsu manages to hold H-01 down, allowing Barnaby to destroy it with its own weapon. However, due to his power running out, Kotetsu is unable to dodge the hit in time and receives crucially fatal injuries.
25	25	"Eternal Immortality."; Transliteration: "Eikyū fumetsu" (Japanese: 永久不滅)	September 18, 2011	March 22, 2013
As the heroes and Kaede mourn Kotetsu's apparent death, Maverick sends several more H-01 androids to attack them, but Saito manages to shut them down thanks to a safety mode implemented by Barnaby's parents. Having no further use of Dr. Rotwang, Maverick kills him, boasting that he will escape justice thanks to his reputation and NEXT power. However, Agnes, who recovered her memory when she saw Kaede use Maverick's power on television, reveals that she has been broadcasting Maverick's rant live. Exposed and cornered, Maverick takes Kaede hostage, but she is saved by Kotetsu, who had only passed out from the pain of his wounds. After revealing that he is not the leader of Ouroboros, Maverick uses his power on himself, leaving him in a stupor. Maverick is taken into custody, only to be killed by Lunatic. Kotetsu announces his retirement, with Barnaby deciding to retire too, so he can start his own life. A year later, Kotetsu, despite his further diminished power, returns to his hero duties. When he fails to catch a criminal, he falls through a glass roof of a car dealership building. Luckily, Barnaby returns in the nick of time and catches him before being smashed on top of a car. In an epilogue scene, a young boy who is about to purchase a hero trading card loses hold of a Stern dollar bill, which drops in a puddle of water revealing the Ouroboros logo hidden under the ink.

=== Tiger & Bunny 2 (2022) ===
No. overall	No. in season	Title	Original release date
Part 1
26	1	"A word to the wise is enough." Transliteration: "Ichi o Kiite jū wo Shiru" (Japanese: 一を聞いて十を知る)	April 8, 2022
27	2	"No one knows the weight of another's burden." Transliteration: "Tanin no nimotsu no omo-sa wa, darenimo wakaranai" (Japanese: 他人の荷物の重さは、誰にも分からない)	April 8, 2022
28	3	"Suspicion will raise bogies." Transliteration: "Utagai wa akuryō o yobiyoseru" (Japanese: 疑いは悪霊を呼び寄せる)	April 8, 2022
29	4	"Never put off till tomorrow what you can do today." Transliteration: "Kyō dekiru koto o ashita ni nobasu na" (Japanese: 今日できることを明日に延ばすな)	April 8, 2022
30	5	"Live and let live." Transliteration: "Jibun mo iki, tanin mo ikase" (Japanese: 自分も生き、他人も生かせ)	April 8, 2022
31	6	"Youth should be regarded with respect." Transliteration: "Goshō oso rubeshi" (Japanese: 後生おそるべし)	April 8, 2022
32	7	"Out of the mouths of babes oft times come gems." Transliteration: "Akago no kuchi kara hōseki" (Japanese: 赤子の口から宝石)	April 8, 2022
33	8	"You can't judge a book by its cover." Transliteration: "Gaiken dakede wa nakami o handan dekinai" (Japanese: 外見だけでは中身を判断できない)	April 8, 2022
34	9	"Have not thy cloak to make when it begins to rain." Transliteration: "Ame ga ori hajimete kara reinkōto o tsukura seru na" (Japanese: 雨が降り始めてからレインコートを作らせるな)	April 8, 2022
35	10	"Pride comes before a fall." Transliteration: "Ogori ga metsubō no mae ni yattekuru" (Japanese: 驕りが滅亡の前にやってくる)	April 8, 2022
36	11	"Every cloud has a silver lining." Transliteration: "Dono kumo mo ura wa gin'iro" (Japanese: どの雲も裏は銀色)	April 8, 2022
37	12	"Man's extremity is God's opportunity." Transliteration: "Hito no nankyoku wa kami no kōki" (Japanese: 人の難局は神の好機)	April 8, 2022
38	13	"Constant dropping wears away a stone." Transliteration: "Tenteki, ishi o ugatsu" (Japanese: 点滴、石を穿つ)	April 8, 2022
Part 2
39	14	"March winds and April Showers bring fourth May Flowers"; Transliteration: "3 Tsuki no kaze to 4 tsuki no niwakaame ga 5 tsuki 4-nichi no hana o motarasu" (Japanese: 3 月の風と 4 月のにわか雨が 5 月 4 日の花をもたらす)	October 7, 2022
40	15	"No Pain No Gain"; Transliteration: "Itami naku shite eru mono nashi." (Japanese: 痛みなくして得るものなし。)	October 7, 2022
41	16	"A friend in need is a friend indeed." Transliteration: "Komatta toki no tomo ga, shin no tomo." (Japanese: 困った時の友が、真の友。)	October 7, 2022
42	17	"the gods sent nuts to those who have no teeth" Transliteration: "Kamigami wa ha no nai hitobito ni konomi o okutta" (Japanese: 神々は歯のない人々に木の実を送った)	October 7, 2022
43	18	"One Eyewitness is better than ten hearsays" Transliteration: "Mokugeki-sha 1-ri wa 10-ri no denbun yori mo sugurete iru" (Japanese: 目撃者1人は10人の伝聞よりも優れている)	October 7, 2022
44	19	"You cannot make a crab walk straight" Transliteration: "Kani o massugu aruka seru koto wa dekinai" (Japanese: カニをまっすぐ歩かせることはできない)	October 7, 2022
45	20	"The darkest hour is just before the dawn" Transliteration: "Ichiban kurai jikantai wa yoake mae" (Japanese: 一番暗い時間帯は夜明け前)	October 7, 2022
46	21	"Nothing comes of nothing" Transliteration: "Nani mo umarenai" (Japanese: 何も生まれない)	October 7, 2022
47	22	"Coming events cast their shadows before" Transliteration: "Kitaru dekigoto ga mae ni kagewootosu" (Japanese: 来る出来事が前に影を落とす)	October 7, 2022
48	23	"Lookers-on see most of the game" Transliteration: "Kenbutsunin wa gēmu no hotondo o miru" (Japanese: 見物人はゲームのほとんどを見る)	October 7, 2022
49	24	"Union is strength" Transliteration: "Danketsu wa tsuyo-sa" (Japanese: 団結は強さ)	October 7, 2022
50	25	"Today is not just tomorrow's yesterday" Transliteration: "Kyō wa ashita no kinō dake janai" (Japanese: 今日は明日の昨日だけじゃない)	October 7, 2022

== Films ==
A film adaptation of the series, Tiger & Bunny: The Beginning, was released in Japanese theatres on September 22, 2012, featuring a reprisal of the events of the TV series alongside an original story.

No.	Title	Release date
1	"Tiger & Bunny: The Beginning"; Transliteration: "Gekijōban Taigā ando Banī -The Beginning-" (Japanese: 劇場版 TIGER & BUNNY -The Beginning-)	September 22, 2012
The first half of the movie retells the events of the first two episodes of the TV series. Following the events of the second episode, Kotetsu "Wild Tiger" Kaburagi tries to arrange a get together for Barnaby "Bunny" Brooks Jr. to get along with the other heroes, which ultimately fails due to them considering themselves rivals. The heroes are quickly called in to chase after a thief named Robin Baxter, who has stolen a statue that represents the importance of heroes. The heroes chase after him into an amusement park but find him near-impossible to catch due to his NEXT ability to instantly switch places with anyone that he can see, leading to some infights amongst the heroes. As Robin heads towards the observation deck, where he could use anyone in the city he can see to escape, Barnaby gets the idea to use his suit as a decoy, allowing him to catch Robin by preventing him from seeing anyone to switch with. The next day, Barnaby learns that it was Kotetsu who helped convince the other heroes to let Barnaby go on his own as he trusted him.

== Home media release ==
Vol.	Episodes	Bonus disc	Release date	Ref.
1	1, 2	-	May 27, 2011	
2	3, 4	-	June 24, 2011	
3	5, 6, 7	-	July 22, 2011	
4	8, 9, 10	-	August 26, 2011	
5	11, 12, 13	*	September 22, 2011	
6	14, 15, 16	*	October 26, 2011	
7	17, 18, 19	*	November 25, 2011	
8	20, 21, 22	*	December 22, 2011	
9	23, 24, 25	*	January 27, 2012	
