= List of Tiger & Bunny characters =

This is a character list for the anime and manga series Tiger & Bunny.

== Heroes ==
(Japan) Kotetsu T. Kaburagi (鏑木・T・虎徹, Kaburagi T. Kotetsu) / Wild Tiger (ワイルドタイガー, Wairudo Taigā)
Voiced by: Hiroaki Hirata (Japanese); Wally Wingert (English)

Sponsors: Apollon Media, S.H. Figuarts, SoftBank, FamilyMart, Lotte, Lawson, Imagination Works, Pac-Man, Kinto, Asadaame
One of the main protagonists and a veteran superhero past his prime whose total disregard for private property when fighting against crime earned him the nickname "Crusher for Justice". Originally, he was the least popular among the heroes of Stern Bild City and his company (a fictional publication known as TopMag) had been taken over thanks to the high costs of his collateral damage. He was then forced by his new employers, Apollon Media, to become Barnaby's partner. His wife Tomoe (友恵) died from a disease five years prior to the series, and his daughter Kaede lives with his mother in Oriental Town out in the country. Like most people outside of Hero TV, Kaede is initially unaware of her father's secret identity. Kotetsu possesses the power to increase his physical abilities hundredfold for five minutes (known as the "Hundred Power"), requiring an hour-long cooldown period before using it again. Later on in the series his ability starts to change, at first becoming more potent at the cost of a shorter time limit, signified by red-orange eyes and an orange aura instead of the normal blue. Tiger's old employer Ben Jackson, working as a cab driver, finds out about Tiger's power boost and informs him that it is actually a precursor to his powers fading away for good, a rare condition among NEXT. The Hundred Power's potency then returns to its original strength, and its time limit grows shorter with each activation, lasting one minute by the end of the first season. Kotetsu keeps a journal to track his decreasing power, each entry showing a decrease of two to five seconds per use. After defeating Albert Maverick, Kotetsu retires from heroics, but returns a year later now calling himself "Wild Tiger 1 Minute" and working with the Second League heroes, vowing to continue being a hero even after his powers disappear for good. From Tiger & Bunny: The Rising onwards, Kotetsu's identity is now public to some degree, though he continues to wear a mask and insist on maintaining his secret identity due to his traditional beliefs. In the second season, during the battle against L.L. Audin, Kotetsu is affected by Gregory Sunshine's ability, which causes his powers to overload and finally burn out completely. With his NEXT powers gone, Kotetsu retires from heroics.
His first Apollon Media suit includes advertisements for Bandai's S.H. Figuarts collector's action figure line and telecommunications company SoftBank. The S.H. Figuarts logo on his chest in the series is replaced by a different ad in the films: FamilyMart in Tiger & Bunny: The Beginning and Lotte in Tiger & Bunny: The Rising. Tiger also possesses a motorcycle called the "Lonely Chaser," which is able to combine with Barnaby's own bike as a sidecar in a combination known as "Double Chaser." Tiger's suit also includes a pair of wire guns. Having been inspired by a hero named Mr. Legend, who helped him to accept his powers, Kotetsu has traditional ideals of justice, always relying on his instincts, putting lives over ratings, and prioritizing hero work over publicity stunts. After helping Barnaby defeat Jake Martinez and finally earning his partner's trust, Kotetsu becomes far more popular and gains much more respect from the public, his employers, and his fellow heroes. In the first Drama CD for the series, it is revealed that Kotetsu and Antonio "Rock Bison" Lopez were punks in their high school days, and it was Kotetsu's class representative Tomoe (who later became his wife) who came up with the name "Wild Tiger." The next episode previews suggest that Kotetsu has a poor grasp of the English language, as he often struggles to read out the next episode's title.
(United States) Barnaby Brooks Jr. (バーナビー・ブルックスJr., Bānabī Burukkusu Junia) / Bunny (バニー, Banī)
Voiced by: Masakazu Morita (Japanese); Yuri Lowenthal (English)

Sponsors: Apollon Media, Bandai, "Crusade System" Card Series, Amazon.co.jp, XFLAG, Monster Strike, Tanita, Battle Spirits
The other protagonist, known as the "Super Rookie," who is nicknamed "Bunny" by Kotetsu because of his armor's earpieces and his penchant for long jumps and kicks. Barnaby is a 25-year-old rookie hero who does not conceal his appearance or identity and is the newest addition to Hero TV. Partnered with Wild Tiger, he has the same power, though Barnaby relies more on strategy than outright brute force, saving his Hundred Power for the most dire of circumstances. His powered suit displays advertising for Amazon.co.jp as well as Bandai and its "Crusade System" Card Series. He is also equipped with a motorcycle called the "Lonely Chaser" that is able to use Tiger's own bike as a sidecar, a combination known as "Double Chaser." When he was four years old, his parents, robotics engineers and the inventors of nano-metal, were assassinated by someone originally thought to be Jake Martinez of the crime syndicate Ouroboros. Barnaby was taken in by Albert Maverick and dedicated his life to investigating Ouroboros and its connection with the death of his family. The trauma of seeing his parents murdered hardened Barnaby's heart and consumed him with thoughts of revenge, making it impossible for him to trust anyone until he began his partnership with Kotetsu. According to Barnaby, he took his real name, also his father's, as his hero name as a declaration of war against Ouroboros.
After defeating Jake Martinez and learning to trust Kotetsu as his partner, Barnaby adopts a positive outlook on life, becoming more open and willing to work with others. He starts addressing Kotetsu by name instead of as "Old Man," and accepts "Bunny" as his nickname to a degree. His successful partnership with Kotetsu soon leads Barnaby to rank first in Hero TV's rankings, earning him the "King of Heroes" title in his debut season. Barnaby eventually surpasses Mr. Legend's points-per-season record, and dreams of a better world envisioned by his surrogate father, Albert Maverick, where all NEXT are accepted and heroes protect the innocent.
After defeating Albert Maverick, who is revealed to have been the man who actually killed his parents, Barnaby retires from heroics thinking his entire career was for nothing. However, when Kotetsu returns as "Wild Tiger 1 Minute" a year later, Barnaby returns as well to assist his partner.
In the second season, Barnaby is shown to have taken up caring for houseplants as a hobby, filling his once-sparse apartment with greenery and frequently turning down invitations to after-work social outings to spend evenings in the company of his plants. Barnaby's leg is grievously injured during a fight with Fugan and Mugan, which never heals properly and becomes cripplingly painful whenever he uses his Hundred Power. His injury, coupled with Kotetsu's own retirement due to his powers burning out, encourages Barnaby to retire from heroics after defeating L.L. Audin.
(United States) Karina Lyle (カリーナ・ライル, Karīna Rairu) / Blue Rose (ブルーローズ, Burū Rōzu)
Voiced by: Minako Kotobuki (Japanese); Kari Wahlgren (English)
Sponsors: Titan Industry, Pepsi & Pepsi NEX, Coolish
Nicknamed the "Super Celebrity of the Heroes," Blue Rose is a high schooler with freezing powers who still lives with her parents and makes use of her heroic feats to boost her career as a singer. She also works as a pianist in bars under her real name. Her revealing costume includes advertising for Pepsi NEX, a zero-calorie Pepsi available in Japan developed by Suntory, a company who took part in the experiment which successfully produced the first true blue rose through genetic engineering, hence her alias and rose-themed uniform. Despite claiming to dislike Kotetsu, Karina develops feelings for him, which causes her much internal conflict considering the age difference. After the one year timeskip, Karina is seen reading a book about how to win a single dad's heart, though in Season two she gives up on trying to vie for the older man's attention. At the insistence of her sponsor company and to her distaste, Blue Rose always tells criminals "my ice is a little bit cold, but your crime has been put completely on hold!" upon apprehending them. Karina has a habit of comically retreating from fights if they get too difficult for her, an act Hero TV's announcer dubs the "Cutie Escape." In the films Tiger & Bunny: The Beginning and Tiger & Bunny: The Rising, her costume's advertising replaces the Pepsi NEX ads for standard Pepsi logos. Her sponsor company is Titan Industry. In the second season, she is partnered with Golden Ryan.
(United States) Keith Goodman (キース・グッドマン, Kīsu Guddoman) / Sky High (スカイハイ, Sukai Hai)
Voiced by: Go Inoue (Japanese); Patrick Seitz (English)
Sponsors: Poseidon Line, Tamashii Nations, Ustream, Movix, T-Joy, Passlogy, Sugi Pharmacy
Also known as the "Wind Wizard," Sky High is an enthusiastic and friendly hero who is the most popular hero in the city and longtime consecutive holder of the "King of Heroes" title at the start of the series. His overly dramatic and optimistic personality is actually his main selling point, with his catchphrases being a cheerful "Thanks, and, thanks again!" (ありがとう、そして、ありがとう!, Arigato, soshite, arigato!) to his fans and his own name when he launches an attack. He, by his own admission, struggles to make his feelings and intentions clear to others, hence why he often repeats himself and gestures dramatically, and does not understand why people find him funny. Additionally, he frequently feels pressured to maintain his "perfect" public image, believing he must always be a positive role model not only to the public, but to his fellow heroes as well. Appropriately for his nature, he owns two golden retrievers named John and Johnjohn. Sky High is able to fly with the assistance of a rocket backpack and has the power to control the wind and air currents. During Tiger & Bunny: The Rising, Sky High is once again the King of Heroes. His uniform includes advertising for Bandai's subsidiary Tamashii Nations and streaming website Ustream.tv. In the films, he also sports ads for Movix and T-Joy, Japanese movie theater chains. His sponsor company is Poseidon Line, which is shown to provide Stern Bild with public transportation such as monorails and taxi cabs. In the second season, he is partnered with Fire Emblem.
(United States) Nathan Seymour (ネイサン・シーモア, Neisan Shīmoa) / Fire Emblem (ファイヤーエンブレム, Faiyā Enburemu)
Voiced by: Kenjiro Tsuda (Japanese); John Eric Bentley (English)
Sponsors: Helios Energy, FMV, Animate, Domino's Pizza, Atsugi, Aqua Clara
An effeminate hero with flame abilities known as the "Bourgeois Open Flame Broil," equipped with a highly maneuverable race car. They display an advanced level of control over their abilities, able to shape their flames into many elaborate shapes and sizes with varying levels of intensity. Nathan struggled to come to terms with their sexuality and gender identity during their childhood, and is implied to have been disowned by their parents because of it. They eventually come to accept themselves by saying that they, and all people like them, possess both the courage of a man and the love of a woman, making them invincible. Nathan identifies as gender free, appropriately using gender-neutral or feminine pronouns in the original Japanese dialogue, and often includes themselves in feminine activities with Karina and Pao-Lin. Nathan is the owner of their own sponsor company, Helios Energy, and their costume displays advertising for FMV of Fujitsu and anime/manga retailer Animate. Their suit in the films Tiger & Bunny: The Beginning and Tiger & Bunny: The Rising features an additional ad for Domino's Pizza. In the second season, they are partnered with Sky High.
(China) Huang Pao-Lin (ホァン・パオリン, Hwan Paorin) / Dragon Kid (ドラゴンキッド, Doragon Kiddo)
Voiced by: Mariya Ise (Japanese); Laura Bailey (season 1 and movies), Cassandra Lee Morris (season 2) (English)
Sponsors: Odysseus Communication, Calbee, DMM.com, Daiichikosho Amusement Multimedia, Ichiran
A young, tomboyish Chinese girl, known as the "Lightning Bolt Kung-Fu Master," armed with a staff and able to generate strong electrical discharges. Pao-Lin's parents did not go with her to Stern Bild City and stayed behind in China. They did, however, leave her a purple flower hairpin that she was originally against wearing, claiming it was "too girly," despite her caretaker's insistence. However, after learning the flower's symbolic meaning was "thinking of you always," she makes a habit of wearing the hairpin whenever she is in civilian attire. During Tiger & Bunny: The Rising, she develops the ability to briefly shape her lightning into various forms, such as a large Chinese dragon. Her Chinese-styled uniform includes advertising for Japanese food company Calbee and Japanese website DMM.com. Her sponsor company is "Odysseus Communication". In the second season, she is partnered with Magical Cat.
(Mexico) Antonio Lopez (アントニオ・ロペス, Antonio Ropesu) / Rock Bison (ロックバイソン, Rokku Baison)
Voiced by: Taiten Kusunoki (Japanese); Travis Willingham (season 1 and movies), Aaron LaPlante (season 2) (English)
Sponsors: Kronos Foods, Gyu-Kaku, Hybrid Futomen DouDou, Sukiya, Karatez, Nozaki's, BUFFALO, Yostar Pictures, Iris Ohyama, Aburaya Seiemon
A green-armored brute nicknamed the "Bull Tank of the West Coast," and Kotetsu "Wild Tiger" Kaburagi's best friend since high school. His power renders him invulnerable, coating his skin with a shiny, bronze material. After ranking last in Hero TV's standings behind Origami Cyclone, he was in danger of losing his job as a hero before helping to catch a backstage thief. By the time of Tiger & Bunny: The Rising, Rock Bison desperately tries to find a new gimmick to boost his popularity by mimicking another hero's catchphrase or behavior. His bull-themed costume, which is equipped with large drills on its shoulders, includes advertising for Japanese barbecue restaurant chain Gyu-Kaku. His suit in Tiger & Bunny: The Rising also features ads for Japanese gyūdon restaurant chain Sukiya. His sponsor company is Kronos Foods. In the second season, he is partnered with Origami Cyclone.
In the first drama CD for the series, it is revealed that Antonio and Kotetsu were both punks in their high school days. Antonio, then the leader of a different school's gang, had repeatedly challenged Kotetsu to fights because of his reputation, and was turned down until Tomoe, Kotetsu's class representative and future wife, was kidnapped. Kotetsu, believing Antonio to be the kidnapper, finally accepted the challenge and the two fought after discovering their opponent was a NEXT. After the fight, Antonio insisted he did not know of a kidnapping, and the nearby warehouse where Tomoe was being kept burst into flames. Kotetsu, not using his Hundred Power up to this point, activated his powers and saved Tomoe, inspiring Antonio to only use his powers to protect people from that day forward.
(Russia) Ivan Karelin (イワン・カレリン, Iwan Karerin) / Origami Cyclone (折紙サイクロン, Origami Saikuron)
Voiced by: Nobuhiko Okamoto (Japanese); Michael Sinterniklaas (English)
Sponsors: Helperidese Finance,.ANIME, Takasu Clinic, Livedoor, Namco & Namco Namja Town, MiniMini, DMM.com, Ōedo Onsen Monogatari, Olfa, Sunshine City, Tokyo, Oi Ocha, Bandai Candy, A-Onstore, Don Quijote
The young "Hidden Hero," later known as the "Expert of Being Seen in the Background," clad in a ninja/samurai-themed costume and known to act much like a kabuki performer. Ivan rarely takes action and engages himself more in advertising than in actual crime-fighting, appearing in the background of photos and broadcasts to please his sponsors. His shapeshifting ability allows him to copy the appearance and voice of other people, but not their abilities or powers, and change into various inanimate objects such as a poster on a wall. Ivan is initially a very reluctant hero, only acting as he does because of insecurities regarding his "useless" power and guilt over becoming a hero over his former friend, Edward. After helping Edward (who had broken out of jail to kill Ivan in jealousy) escape Lunatic's judgement, Ivan vows to become a more active hero and move out of the background, quickly rising out of last place in Hero TV's rankings for the first time. However, he still engages in the occasional photobomb, with a running joke having him appear hidden somewhere in the background of a scene, even ones not broadcast on Hero TV. His sponsor company is Helperides Finance. In the epilogue of the series, it is revealed that Ivan regularly visits Edward in prison to tell him about his exploits as Origami Cyclone. In the second season, he reveals that he was bullied and ostracized for his NEXT abilities as a child until his class was caught in a typhoon during an overnight camping trip. He used his abilities to mimic his teacher to comfort his frightened classmates, finding purpose in his life. He chose the name Origami Cyclone in memory of this event and feels strong pride about it as a result.
Origami Cyclone's involvement in the Ouroboros incident tremendously boosts his popularity and reputation as a true hero and not just a walking billboard. His costume contains advertising for anime goods website .ANIME and eventually gains other sponsors: internet service provider Livedoor, and Namco's NAM-Chara Cheer Squad. In the films Tiger & Bunny: The Beginning and Tiger & Bunny: The Rising, his suit also displays ads for Bandai Visual Club. To offset Origami's power being little use in combat, he has various weapons to assist him. The large shuriken on his back can be thrown and ridden, and he has an arsenal of normal sized shuriken. The swords on his back can also be used. By the time of Tiger & Bunny: The Rising, Origami has been training himself to be a more aggressive hero, making more use of his suit's various weapons. In the second season, he is partnered with Rock Bison.
(United States) Ryan Goldsmith (ライアン・ゴールドスミス, Raian Gōrudosumisu) / Golden Ryan (ゴールデンライアン, Gōruden Raian)
Voiced by: Yuichi Nakamura (Japanese); Henry Dittman (English)
Sponsors: Apollon Media, Banpresto, Tantia, Dartslive, Bandai, EyeCity
A hero from overseas, nicknamed "Gravity Prince," who appears in the movie, Tiger & Bunny: The Rising, serving as Kotetsu's replacement as Barnaby's partner. Ryan displays a boisterous, showboating personality, caring far more about being in the spotlight and earning points than saving lives, the complete opposite of Barnaby's former partner. Under his egotistical nature, however, he is actually fairly perceptive. He possesses the power to create a strong localized gravity field, immobilizing anyone within a certain radius. He is also shown he is able to alter the shape of the field by thinning the width to increase the length to subdue an enemy further away. However, using his powers makes him incredibly vulnerable to attack, as it requires him to remain stationary with his hands on the ground. He possesses a golden motorcycle with a lion motif (a play on his name in Japanese, as Ryan [ライアン] shares the same pronunciation as Lion [ライアン]), which is able to combine with Barnaby's Lonely Chaser. He eventually leaves Stern Bild after an overseas company offers him a larger salary than Apollon Media did. Ryan's catchphrases are "kiss my boots," typically said after he uses his power to immobilize someone, and a loud shout whenever he activates his power. His hero suit, designed by Saito and rented to Ryan's parent company from Apollon Media, is equipped with a pair of wings to appear as a Sphinx and features advertising for Banpresto, weighing scale manufacturer Tanita, and dartboard manufacturer Dartslive. In the second season, he returns to Stern Bild City and rejoins the Hero TV group, being partnered with Blue Rose as part of the show's new buddy format. It is revealed that he returned to Stern Bild after being seriously wounded when going after Gregory Sunshine. He has a pet iguana named Molly, whom he cares greatly for, even keeping photos of her on his desk.
(United States) Thomas Taurus (トーマス・トーラス, Tōmasu Tōrasu) / He Is Thomas (ヒーイズトーマス, Hī Izu Tōmasu)
Sponsors: Jungle, Tempstaff by PERSOL
Voiced by: Nobunaga Shimazaki (Japanese); Josh Keaton (English)
"The One Adorned in White Light," a new hero clad in white armor with an angel motif. A loner by nature who doesn't trust others, he keeps his distance from everyone, even his own partner, Mr. Black. He and his little sister, Ruby, were orphaned as children when their parents were killed in a car accident. They were placed in an orphanage and hoped to be adopted together, but ran away when they were to be separated, due to couples not wanting him because of his NEXT powers. Shortly after, Ruby was shot by a thief in the leg, and the two were taken back to the orphanage, where Ruby was eventually adopted, leaving Thomas behind. Thomas is telekinetic, able to levitate and throw objects with his mind, but is limited in that he can only lift objects he could lift physically. He is noted to have great potential as a hero, being compared to Barnaby in terms of skill. His fans refer to him as "HIT" and are known as "Hitters."
(Japan) Subaru Sengoku (仙石 昴, Sengoku Subaru) / Mr. Black (Mr. ブラック, Misutā Burakku)
Sponsors: Jungle, S.H. Figuarts
Voiced by: Shōya Chiba (Japanese); Robbie Daymond (English)
A hot-blooded yet arrogant 17-year old new hero, nicknamed the "Man in Black" for his black armor, Mr. Black possesses the power to create energy barriers limited in power and size by his ability to focus, frequently leaving him at a disadvantage due to his hotheaded and impulsive nature. He later develops his ability enough to form his barriers into different shapes such as a rod weapon or a multi-layered barrier. Subaru is enthusiastic about being a hero, but is initially disappointed with Sternbild's veteran heroes because he sees them as acting and being treated more like celebrities than the proper heroes he thinks they should be. He was once a hero in another city going by the name Hello Goodbye and dislikes his new name and costume. He is partnered with He Is Thomas.
(Ukraine) Lara Tsaikokaya (ラーラ・チャイコスカヤ, Rāra Chaikosukaya) / Magical Cat (マジカルキャット, Majikaru Kyatto)
Sponsors: Odysseus Communication, Marui, LINE Manga Service
Voiced by: Tomori Kusunoki (Japanese); Corrina Boettger (English)
A new hero dressed as a cat-themed magical girl and nicknamed the "Magical Girl Carnivoran" with the power to generate water from either her hands or her magic wand weapon. The strength of her power is linked to her emotional state, with fear and nervousness dramatically reducing the volume and pressure of the water she is able to generate. This frequently becomes an issue in the field, as Lara is timid and sensitive by nature. She is partnered with Dragon Kid. Being 14, she's youngest of all the heroes, and is raised by an overbearing single mother who attempts to manipulate her daughter into believing her colleagues, especially her partner/mentor Dragon Kid, are no more than vicious rivals that are intentionally trying to hold her back.

== Antagonists ==
(United States) Yuri Petrov (ユーリ・ペトロフ, Yūri Petorofu) / Lunatic (ルナティック, Runatikku)
Voiced by: Kōji Yusa (Japanese); Liam O'Brien (English)
Stern Bild City's Administration of Justice's judge as well as the TV heroes' curator who is also the "Dark Hero" known as Lunatic, a vigilante NEXT nicknamed the "Sanctioner with Blue Flame" who can generate intense blue flames that he can mold into arrows to fire from his crossbow or propel himself. He can also use his flames to teleport, pass through solid objects, or encircle his target to prevent their escape. Lunatic is obsessed with his personal idea of justice based on an eye for an eye philosophy. He believes that criminals and wrongdoers should receive punishment equal to their sins, cleansing the world of evil through killing violent and unrepentant criminals. To that end, he questions the effectiveness of Hero TV's heroes, who simply capture criminals regardless of their crimes. Yuri adopted his idea of justice and hatred of heroes after killing his father, Mr. Legend, unintentionally with his power when he defended his mother from his father's beatings. The handprint design on Lunatic's mask is a reminder of the burn he got in the process, and he covers the disfiguring scars with heavy cosmetics when in public, giving his face a pale tone. Yuri cares for his senile mother, who usually believes Mr. Legend is still alive and Yuri is still a child, only to launch into a hateful rage directed towards Yuri when he insists otherwise. Lunatic's appearances are marked by a giant red moon hanging in the sky. Lunatic often tells his victims to "hear the voice of Thanatos" before killing them. After his mother was killed by burglars, Yuri incinerates himself after being exposed as Lunatic while mortally injured from helping Tiger and Bunny defeat Audun.
(United States) Albert Maverick (アルバート・マーベリック, Arubāto Māberikku)
Voiced by: Nobuaki Fukuda (Japanese); Jamieson Price (English)
The President and CEO of Apollon Media, the company responsible for Hero TV and sponsor company for Wild Tiger and Barnaby. He was a good friend of the Brooks family and often took care of young Barnaby when his parents were working. After Barnaby's parents were killed, Maverick took him in and became his adoptive father. It is later revealed that Maverick is a NEXT with the power to alter memory, and is the true murderer of Barnaby's parents. Over the years, he intentionally shaped Barnaby's memories and life to cover his tracks and, seeing great potential in the boy, inspire him to become the perfect hero. In order to get Hero TV's ratings up from their initial slump thanks to public distrust of NEXT, Maverick had worked with Ouroboros to set up extravagant crimes for heroes like Mr. Legend to thwart. Maverick was forced to assassinate Barnaby's parents when Barnaby Sr. threatened to publicly reveal the whole operation because the family's nano-metal hero suit compound was being given to criminals. As Kotetsu and Barnaby get closer to discovering the truth, Maverick sets up an elaborate ploy to continue covering his tracks, framing Kotetsu for the murder of Barnaby's Aunt Samantha and wiping the heroes' and Hero TV employees' memories of Kotetsu, but not of Wild Tiger. He also commissions the creation of a new, more advanced black and red hero suit for Barnaby and several androids dressed in a similarly colored version of Tiger's suit. When confronted by all eight heroes, Maverick admits defeat and uses his powers on himself, wiping his memories completely and leaving him in a catatonic stupor. While being transported via police convoy to prison, Maverick is killed by Lunatic, who tells him that "no one can escape their sins."
(Germany) Dr. Rotwang (ロトワング, Rotowangu)
Voiced by: Mitsuru Miyamoto (Japanese); Vic Mignogna (English)
A mad scientist who worked under Barnaby's parents and greatly despises NEXT, believing them to be monsters. He is a genius in robotics, having created a very powerful android by the name of Cis that was capable of overwhelming both Kotetsu and Barnaby with their powers active. He is later employed by Maverick to build a more powerful android, the H-01, clad in a red and black version of Wild Tiger's armor and armed with a powerful laser rifle. H-01 was constructed to defeat the heroes and eventually replace them with more H-01 model androids, as Maverick believes them to be more useful for Hero TV since androids would not have personal lives and would not tire. Rotwang is a cold man who believes things such as human emotions and relationships to be nonsense, greatly favoring what his androids can do. Rotwang falls to his death from the top of the Apollon Media statue after Maverick claims he has outlived his usefulness.
(United Kingdom) Robin Baxter (ロビン・バクスター, Robin Bakusutā)
Voiced by: Kappei Yamaguchi (Japanese); Jason Spisak (English)
An internationally-wanted thief who appears in the movie, Tiger & Bunny: The Beginning. He is a NEXT who has the ability to instantly switch locations with anybody he can see. His outfit is fitted with an assortment of wheels and roller-blades in order to travel quickly on foot. In the movie, he steals a symbolic statue and uses his power to confuse the heroes. However, he is thwarted when Barnaby, having gotten an idea from Kotetsu, uses his suit as a decoy and traps Robin so he cannot see and switch places with anyone. In the second season, he ends up among the NEXT infected by Gregory Sunshine.
(United States) Richard Max (リチャード・マークス, Richādo Mākusu)
Voiced by: Rikiya Koyama (Japanese); Matthew Mercer (English)
A former professional boxer who appears in the movie Tiger & Bunny: The Rising, seeking revenge on Mark Schneider for ruining his boxing career. He is a NEXT with the ability to amplify his voice to create destructive waves of sound. He wears a special mask to control his abilities.
(India) Kasha Graham (カシャ・グラハム, Kasha Gurahamu)
Voiced by: Nana Mizuki (Japanese); Cristina Valenzuela (English)
A NEXT with the power to create duplicates of herself, appearing in the movie Tiger & Bunny: The Rising. Kasha seeks revenge against Mark Schneider for closing down the theater she once performed in as a dancer. She utilizes chakrams as her weapon of choice, using her NEXT ability to disorient opponents. Her duplicates disappear if struck, though are just as capable of attacking as the real Kasha.
(China) Johnny Wong (ジョニー・ウォン, Jonī Uon)
Voiced by: Mugihito (Japanese); Michael McConnohie (English)
An elderly NEXT who appears in the movie Tiger & Bunny: The Rising. Johnny seeks revenge against Mark Schneider for destroying the temple at which he once served as a monk. Johnny has the ability to induce a deep sleep in anyone who comes into contact with him. While asleep, the victim will be trapped in a nightmare of their worst fears until they either overcome the fear or Johnny is defeated. Johnny also possesses enhanced healing abilities from a cellular regeneration belt he wears and is an accomplished martial artist armed with a three-section staff.
(United States) Virgil Dingfelder (ヴィルギル・ディングフェルダー, Vuirugiru Dinguferudā) / Andrew Scott (アンドリュー・スコット, Andoryū Sukotto)
Voiced by: Daisuke Hirakawa (Japanese); Crispin Freeman (English)
Mark Schneider's aide, appearing in the film Tiger & Bunny: The Rising. As Virgil Dingfelder, he is a calm, quiet, reserved man who loyally works under Schneider. His real name is later revealed to be Andrew Scott, the son of a single father who founded a small technology firm. Andrew's father entered a business deal with Schneider and was later bought out. This left the Scott family with nothing and eventually led to Andrew's father's suicide. Andrew blamed Schneider for his father's death and concocted a plan to take on a new identity and get close to Schneider and get revenge. To that end, he enlisted the help of Richard Max, Kasha Graham, and Johnny Wong, who all similarly wanted revenge on Schneider for their own reasons. Andrew is also revealed to be a NEXT himself, with the power of technopathy, giving him the ability to control and shape technology in various ways. He ends up among the NEXT infected by Gregory Sunshine.
(United States) Gregory Sunshine (グレゴリー・サンシャイン, Guregorī Sanshain)
Voiced by: Takehito Koyasu (Japanese); Robbie Daymond (English)
A convicted serial killer NEXT serving a lifetime sentence, possessing the ability to cause another to lose control of their NEXT powers by licking them. Those he afflict with his power go berserk until the effect wears off, a notable case being Golden Ryan, whom he seriously injured by causing a building to collapse on top of him. Gregory ends up escaping when he taken by Ouroboros as a test subject of an experimental NEXT-enhancement drug, killing his way out while escaping with vials of the drug. He would later be found by Sigourney Rosicky, who recruits him for her plan. Gregory uses the drug to boost his ability to control multiple NEXT indefinitely, which is initially seen by the public as an infectious disease dubbed "X." NEXT affected by his boosted power gain solid red eyes and lose all rationality, blindly rampaging and attacking people indiscriminately. After being arrested, Gregory ends up being assassinated by Ouroboros to silence him.
L. L. Audun (L.L.オーダン, L. L. Ōdan)
Voiced by: Tetsu Inada
A legendary NEXT criminal who gained infamy for killing 16 heroes before finally being defeated and imprisoned. Audun is a hulking man possessing the Hundred Power, though unlike Kotetsu and Barnaby, he is able to activate his powers again after only one minute of recharge time. His ability, coupled with his already incredibly strong body, has led to many considering him the most powerful NEXT of all time. His time in solitary confinement in prison has eroded his sanity and he now believes himself to be a "champion of justice" with the motto "believe in nothing but your own strength."

=== Ouroboros ===
A criminal organization whose ultimate goal is demonizing NEXT in the public eye, having infiltrated various infrastructures.

(United States) Jake Martinez (ジェイク・マルチネス, Jeiku Maruchinesu)
Voiced by: Keiji Fujiwara (Japanese); Steve Blum (English)
A NEXT who leads a small sub-faction of the Ouroboros criminal organization, Jake is initially thought to be the man who killed Barnaby's parents. He was captured by Legend 15 years before the start of the series and was serving a 250-year-long sentence in prison, but in the present day his comrades stage a large scale terrorist attack, threatening to bring down Stern Bild City unless he is released. His main objective is to have NEXT take over the world with him as their leader, believing NEXT to be intrinsically superior to normal humans almost to the point of godhood. He appears to have some appreciation for art, since he is first seen using his powers to make a mural of a forest landscape on his cell wall; however, it also contains a hidden picture of a skull.
He has the ability to produce force fields of various sizes, which he can use both defensively and offensively. It is later discovered that he has a previously unheard of second power, telepathy. Jake's left leg was lost in an accident at some point in the past, and is replaced by a mechanical prosthetic by the present day. He is eventually defeated in his fight with Barnaby thanks to Tiger's help. While trying to escape via helicopter, he is restrained by Tiger. In retaliation, he fires off an offensive barrier, misses, and hits his own getaway helicopter, which falls on him and kills him, a fate Lunatic found appropriate and ironic. Unlike other NEXT, whose eyes and body glow blue when using their powers, Jake's aura and eyes shine orange. Later in the series, Kriem reveals that Jake had kidnapped her on the very day that Barnaby's parents were killed and was with her at the time that the murders took place. Despite Barnaby initially dismissing these claims, Kotetsu later reveals that Jake had no Ouroboros tattoo on the back of his right hand, a feature Barnaby recalled in his memories. The revelation that Jake was not the true murderer of the Brooks family sent Barnaby into a depressed, enraged stupor.
(United States) Kriem (クリーム, Kurīmu)
Voiced by: Michiko Neya (Japanese); Stephanie Sheh (English)
Another NEXT member of Ouroboros whose ability is to control inanimate objects (typically dolls) with needles made from her hair. She is Jake Martinez's most loyal follower and is implied to have been romantically involved with him. During Tiger and Barnaby's confrontation with Ouroboros, Jake accidentally shoots down the escape helicopter she is piloting, causing her to fall out onto the stadium roof. After the conflict, she falls into a coma and is hospitalized, her head shaved to prevent her from using her powers should she awaken. Ten months later, Kriem comes out of her coma, only to reveal that Jake had kidnapped her on the day that Barnaby's parents were murdered, and therefore could not have been the murderer.
Kriem was harassed by people for being a NEXT throughout her childhood, which made her feel worthless and inferior to humans. When she was kidnapped by Jake, her parents, ashamed and afraid of their daughter, did not bring the ransom. Urging Jake to kill her and end her worthless life, Jake instead taught her that she was superior to humans and that they only ostracized her because they were afraid of her. From that day on, she joined Jake in the fight to create a world where only NEXT existed. Upon revealing her past, she rips out the IV lines in her body and starts convulsing, telling Barnaby that he would live the rest of his life in doubt as punishment for killing Jake before finally dying, happy that she'll be reunited with him in the afterlife. She also reveals in her final moments that Jake only controlled a small portion of Ouroboros, and the organization is far bigger than anyone could comprehend.
(United States) Hans Chuckman (ハンス・チャックマン, Hansu Chakkuman)
Voiced by: Kenta Miyake (Japanese); Vic Mignogna (English)
A member of Jake's Ouroboros faction, serving under Kriem. He has no NEXT powers, but he is a firm believer in the organization's cause. The heroes kidnap him, so Origami Cyclone can take his place. But Jake discovers the ruse; Hans thought he would be rescued, but Jake killed him instead as he lost all respect from him since he was easily captured.
(United States) Fugan (フガン, Fugan) and (United States) Mugan (ムガン, Mugan)
Voiced by: Mamoru Miyano (Fugan), Kensho Ono (Mugan) (Japanese); Johnny Yong Bosch (Fugan), Jason Spisak (Mugan) (English)
NEXT twin brothers associated with Ouroboros through their guardian Nicolai Brahe, a member of the organization who took them in rather than be placed in an orphanage. Immature for their age, they idolize L.L. Audin and solve to beat Audin's record by doubling the quota when Brahe is forced by his superiors to send the brothers out to take out heroes. Their hero hunt takes them to Stern Bild City, only to end up fatally wounded by the heroes and later killed by Gregory Sunshine. Fugan possesses the ability to absorb any damage he receives to increase his power while Mugan can teleport, both strengthened when they are injected with an experimental drug.
(Denmark) Nicolai Brahe (ニコライ・ブラーエ, Nikorai Burāe)
Voiced by: Hiroyuki Kinoshita (Japanese); Kirk Thornton (English)
A high ranking member of Ouroboros who acts as Fugan and Mugan's surrogate father and handler. Nicolai was once one of the Nemo Children, orphans who were adopted and indoctrinated by Ouroboros. He possesses an Ouroboros tattoo on the back of his hand, which is noted to be unusual for someone of his standing within the organization. Nicolai is eventually revealed to be a NEXT with the power to petrify people and the true reason why the heroes Fugan and Mugan defeat are left comatose. As Nicolai's power only works as long as a fist is clenched, he wears a tight leather mitt over one hand to keep it closed at all times.
(Czech Republic) Sigourney Rosicky (シガニー・ロシツキー, Shiganī Roshitsukī)
Voiced by: Takako Honda (Japanese); Julie Nathanson (English)
One of Ouroboros' top executives and the backer of the NEXT power-boosting drug project, which was originally intended to allow normal humans to develop NEXT abilities. She is later revealed to be one of the Nemo Children with her NEXT ability being to possess others by inserting her consciousness into whoever she touches, leaving her body in a comatose state until transferring her consciousness back into it. This also causes a distinctive golden shine in the eyes of anyone she is currently controlling, jumping from one body to another. After being demoted for Gregory Sunshine ruining their lab, she recruits him for her scheme to assassinate Little Aurora, whose ideals she blamed for her childhood friends' suicide over not being useful to society as NEXT. She is ultimately killed by Gregory under orders from her superiors, killing her current host body to kill her actual body.

== Supporting characters ==
(United States) Ben Jackson (ベン・ジャクソン, Ben Jakkuson)
Voiced by: Katsuhisa Houki (Japanese); Beau Billingslea (English)
Tiger's old employer at the start of the series, the hero division director of TopMag. Because of the ever-rising repair costs of Tiger's antics, TopMag goes bankrupt and is bought out, causing Jackson to lose his job. He becomes a cab driver for Poseidon Line later on in the series and remains a good friend of Kotetsu, having total faith in him as a hero. He later appears to Kotetsu when his powers get a boost, telling him that is a sign that they will eventually fade and that his idol, Mr. Legend, faced the same problem. Jackson appears once more to provide support to Tiger when he is framed for murder by Maverick. He provides Kotetsu with his old TopMag Wild Tiger costume, declaring he was always a big fan and that he will always support Wild Tiger. One year after the events of the series, Jackson becomes a high-level employee at Apollon Media.
(France) Agnes Joubert (アニエス・ジュベール, Aniesu Jubēru)
Voiced by: Yuhko Kaida (Japanese); Tara Platt (English)
The producer for Hero TV, having been recently promoted before the first episode; Mr. Maverick would later admit he was wrong to have doubted the decision to promote her, since she does an amazing job. Her top priority is to increase the show's ratings and please her boss and the sponsors, regardless of the impact on the heroes' work. She always greets the heroes with the phrase, "Bonjour, Heroes" ("Hello, Heroes" in the English dub.) In the second season, she has gained a noticeable amount of weight.
(United States) Alexander Lloyds (アレキサンダー・ロイス, Arekisandā Roisu)
Voiced by: Wataru Yokojima (Japanese); Daran Norris (English)
Albert's subordinate at Apollon Media, responsible for managing Kotetsu and Barnaby's career. At first, he quiets any protests made by Kotetsu by presenting resignation as an alternative, but after Kotetsu and Barnaby's fame increases thanks to defeating Jake Martinez, his attitude becomes much friendlier.
(Japan) Saito (斉藤, Saitō)
Voiced by: Hiroshi Iwasaki (Japanese); Dave Wittenberg (English)
An engineer working for Apollon Media in charge of developing equipment for the company's superheroes. He normally speaks respectfully in a barely audible voice, but shouts loudly and brazenly over radios and intercoms. He also has a penchant for adding new upgrades to the heroes' suits that have very little usefulness in the field, such as a complicated clock on the left arm of Tiger's suit for checking the time, and "Good Luck Mode". Good Luck Mode consists of flashy add-ons to Tiger and Barnaby's armor that create a giant fist and leg, respectively, when their power is close to running out. Good Luck Mode is initially thought to increase Tiger and Barnaby's strength, but Saito reveals that the parts and their special effects are just for show and it is actually the pair's excellent teamwork that helps them. In the second season, Tiger and Barnaby's new suits feature "Hyper Good Luck Mode", which forms an even larger fist and leg as well as an armored visor over the faces of their helmets. Saito also develops a special sleep chamber for Barnaby that allows him to access his memories more clearly in his dreams by depriving him of outside stimuli. Saito displays an almost sadistic level of glee whenever tests must be done on Kotetsu or his suit, seemingly making them agonizing for Kotetsu on purpose.
(United States) Kaede Kaburagi (鏑木 楓, Kaburagi Kaede)
Voiced by: Rina Hidaka (Japanese); Eden Riegel (English)
Kotetsu's ten-year-old daughter, who lives with her grandmother in Oriental Town since her mother died and her father became Wild Tiger and moved to Stern Bild. She is initially unaware of her father's life as a hero, and resents and distrusts him for always being tied up with "work" and not understanding her more mature needs and fears of being left alone. Ironically enough, she is a huge fan of Barnaby, her father's partner, since he saved her from falling debris early in his career. She keeps dozens of pictures of Barnaby in her desk drawer, usually cutting out Wild Tiger whenever he is present in them. Kotetsu's one dream in life is to make his daughter think he is "cool", and he tries his hardest to balance his roles as hero and father with varying degrees of success. Kaede eventually awakens as a NEXT with the power to copy the abilities of other NEXT, which she is unable to consciously control and activates as soon as she touches another NEXT. Additionally, she can only copy a NEXT's powers once and touching another NEXT immediately overwrites the last ability she copied. Kaede initially treats her new abilities with distaste, as they cause her and her family much stress. After learning of her father's true identity when he is framed for murder, Kaede travels to Stern Bild alone to prove her father's innocence, having a run-in with Albert Maverick upon reaching the Apollon Media building and inadvertently copying his power. When she finally meets up with her father, she tries to prove his innocence to the other heroes, and when the try to apprehend him she uses her absorbed memory-alteration power to give them their memories back, only missing Barnaby because Sky High claps her shoulder in congratulation (thereby overwriting the previous ability) immediately before he arrives. Kaede becomes a key player in the final conflict with Maverick, assisting the heroes in escaping Dr. Rotwang. In the second season, she expresses a desire to enter the Hero Academy and become a superhero like her father.
Kaede's prodding and complaints that Kotetsu has become an "uncool" couch potato are part of the reason he returns to being Wild Tiger one year after quitting. She finds it annoying that she can no longer watch her father's exploits as a Second League hero on Hero TV, as the show only covers the First League. Even after accepting and coming to terms with her father's life as a superhero, she still routinely refuses his attempts at fatherly affection, albeit in a playful manner.
Cis (シス, Shisu)
Voiced by: Akiko Yajima (Japanese); Stephanie Sheh (English)
A powerful android created by Dr. Rotwang with the appearance of a young woman, whose databanks contain information about the active heroes. While being transported, the truck carrying her is struck by lightning and she escapes. Keith later finds her sitting on a park bench. Despite only being able to respond in a few basic phrases, Keith's conversations with Cis help to boost his confidence after losing the King of Heroes title to Barnaby, eventually leading to him falling in love with her. Cis is programmed with an automatic attack system whenever heroes are seen or mentioned, leading her to attack and almost overwhelm Kotetsu and Barnaby, losing her outer skin in the ensuing fight. Keith as Sky High soon arrives and destroys the android. After the battle, Keith returns to the now empty bench where he met Cis with a bouquet of roses intending to confess his feelings to her, not realizing that the android he destroyed earlier and the girl he fell for are one and the same.
(United States) Samantha Taylor (サマンサ・テイラー, Samansa Teirā)
Voiced by: Yoshiko Takemura (Japanese); Tara Platt (English)
Barnaby's childhood caretaker and aunt. When Barnaby asks her about what she was doing on the day his parents were murdered, she claims that she was sick in bed that day. However, she then discovers a photo of herself with Barnaby at a Christmas festival instead of Maverick as Barnaby remembered. She plans to reveal it to Kotetsu, but Maverick, using his influence with Ouroboros, orchestrates a crime to keep the heroes occupied and uses the opportunity to kidnap her. Maverick quickly murders Taylor and burns the picture, framing Kotetsu for the crime as he had gone to Taylor's house the night before to meet with her.
(United States) Mr. Legend (ミスター・レジェンド, Misutā Rejendo)
Voiced by: Jūrōta Kosugi (Japanese); Kyle Hebert (English)
Stern Bild City's first superhero and father of Yuri Petrov, better known as the vigilante NEXT Lunatic. He was the one who inspired Kotetsu to accept his powers and become a superhero himself and taught his son to never turn a blind eye to evil. After his death, other NEXT follow his example, leading to society's current acceptance of NEXT and heroes. His power seemed to be increased strength and durability, which contrasted with his out-of-shape appearance. Mr. Legend faced the same fading power problem Tiger faces, and turned to alcohol to drown his sorrows, pressured by the public's expectations. In addition, the other heroes of his time would put up a ruse, apprehending criminals then falsifying police records to give Mr. Legend credit, which kept him at the top of the rankings. Mr. Legend was killed by his son after he beat his wife in a drunken rage, the emotional strain causing Yuri's powers to awaken for the first time. His spirit continues to torment Yuri many years later, questioning the validity of his actions.
(United States) Mark Schneider (マーク・シュナイダード, Māku Shunaidā)
Voiced by: Hochu Otsuka (Japanese); Sam Riegel (English)
The new president of Apollon Media during the events of Tiger & Bunny: The Rising. Schneider is a cold, arrogant, and corrupt executive, seeing NEXT as inhuman and wanting to replace Hero TV with a program where NEXT fight to the death against dangerous animals. He has stepped on a number of people over the years to get to his current position, causing a group of NEXT to seek revenge against him for ruining their lives. His numerous crimes are eventually exposed by Yuri Petrov after a failed execution as Lunatic.

== Second League Heroes ==
The Second League is composed of heroes in training meant to be the next generation of heroes, who do not get exposure on Hero TV and who are not sponsored by companies. The Second League featured in the series is shown to be fairly incompetent and ineffective compared to their First League superiors. The Second League typically deals with very minor crimes such as purse-snatching. Kotetsu "Wild Tiger" Kaburagi and Barnaby Brooks Jr. are briefly members of the Second League as their senpai (先輩) during the events of Tiger & Bunny: The Rising.

Ms. Violet (ミス・バイオレット, Misu Baioretto)
Voiced by: Toshimi Kanno (Japanese); Tara Sands (English)
One of the Second League heroes, the green-haired Ms. Violet dresses in a purple and green outfit with a visor. She possesses the power to fire her fingernails, which she claims are coated in a highly potent paralytic agent, but the most they have ever been shown to do is give criminals a slight itch.
Sumo Thunder (相撲・サンダー, Sumō Sandā)
Voiced by: Takahiro Miyamoto
A heavy-set Second League hero styled after a samurai. He possesses the power to spray high volumes of salt from his hands, which is considered more of a nuisance than a hindrance to criminals. He appears to be equipped with a large katana, but is never seen using it.
Bombeman (ボンベマン, Bonbeman)
Voiced by: Yū Hayashi (Japanese); Keith Silverstein (English)
A Second League hero wearing an orange and white outfit, Bombeman has the ability to breathe underwater, severely limiting his effectiveness in the field.
Chopman (チョップマン, Choppuman)
Voiced by: Seki Yu
Dressed in a white and blue outfit with a translucent purple helmet, Chopman possesses the ability to grow his hands to enormous sizes, which causes them to sometimes get stuck in narrow spaces.
