= Wally Wingert =

American voice actor

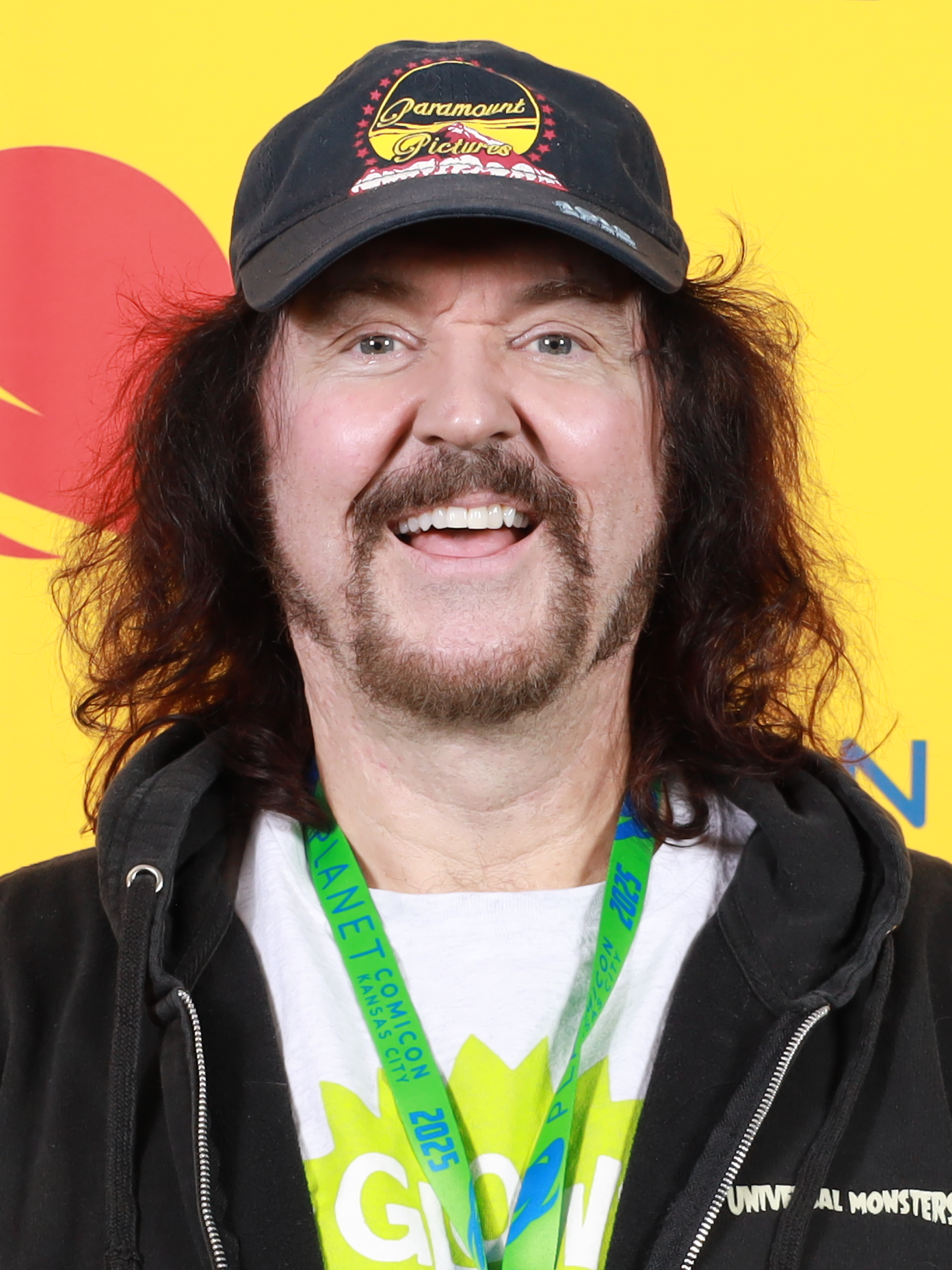
- Wingert in 2025
- Born: Des Moines, Iowa, U.S.
- Occupations: Voice actor, radio personality
- Years active: 1977–present
- Website: wallyontheweb.com

Wallace Wingert is an American voice actor and former radio personality. His roles include Almighty Tallest Red in Invader Zim, Renji Abarai in Bleach, Psycho Blue in Power Rangers In Space, Kotetsu T. Kaburagi / Wild Tiger in Tiger & Bunny, the Riddler in the Batman: Arkham series, Jon Arbuckle in The Garfield Show, Cubot in Sonic the Hedgehog, and the mascot of H. H. Gregg.

== Early life ==
Wingert was born in Des Moines, Iowa, but soon moved to Sioux Falls, South Dakota.

== Career ==
Wingert began his career in radio as a disc jockey in 1977, at the age of 16 years old. He eventually moved to Los Angeles, California in 1987, continuing his radio career.

In 1989, Wingert parodied the Escape Club song "Wild, Wild West" on the Dr. Demento radio show as "Adam West", in response to the casting of Michael Keaton as the titular character for Batman. He continued to work with the radio business with Westwood One, but later left the station and would take a full-time position as an air personality with KTWV. After five years, he eventually left the radio station and would pursue a career in acting and voice acting. Following Kevin Conroy's death in November 2022, Wingert posted a heartfelt story on how he cited his meeting with Conroy as a major influence on his career.

Wingert was the announcer for The Jay Leno Show, replacing John Melendez; when NBC moved Leno back from primetime to late night, he remained as announcer for the second Leno iteration of The Tonight Show. He was also the voice of Jon Arbuckle from The Garfield Show. He is also known for his roles as Almighty Tallest Red from Invader Zim (opposite Kevin McDonald), Hank Pym from The Avengers: Earth's Mightiest Heroes, the Riddler from the Batman: Arkham series, Renji Abarai from Bleach and Kotetsu T. Kaburagi / Wild Tiger from Tiger & Bunny.

He narrated Impact: Stories of Survival on the Discovery Health Channel, How to Build Everything on the Science Channel, Amazing Medical Stories and That's Gotta Hurt on TLC, some episodes of E! True Hollywood Story on E! and Outdoor Outtakes on the Outdoor Life Network.

== Personal life ==
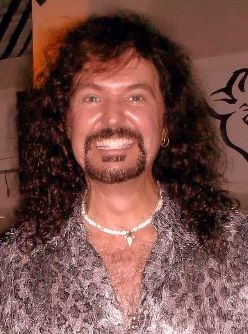
Wingert in 2007

Wingert currently resides in Palm Springs, California. In his spare time, he enjoys collecting animation art, autographs, drawings, movie and television costumes, collectible toys and rock and roll merchandise.

He is not related to voice actor Mick Wingert.

== Filmography ==
=== Live-action ===
==== Film ====
List of acting performances in feature films
Year	Title	Role	Notes
1999	Can of Worms	The Loafer Alien (voice)	Television film
2000	The Bogus Witch Project	Zombie Chef	Segment: "In the Woods Segments"
2004	Scooby Doo 2: Monsters Unleashed	Green Eyed Skeleton Brother (voice)	
2005	Wannabe	Chain Gang Actor #1	
2006	Goolians: A Docu-Comedy	Wally	Documentary film Also writer
2007	Livin' on a Prayer	Butch McGuire	Short film
2007	Real Hollywood Meeting	The Special Effects Artist	Short film
2017	Chappaquiddick	Newscaster (voice)	

==== Television ====
List of acting performances in television shows
Year	Title	Role	Notes
1993	Murphy Brown	Kelbo (voice)	Episode: "It's Not Easy Being Brown"
1996	Saved by the Bell: The New Class	Don Lewis	Episode: "Backstage Pass"
1997	The Drew Carey Show	Parrot (voice)	Episode: "Man's Best Same Sex Companion"
1998	Power Rangers in Space	Psycho Blue (voice)	
1999	Power Rangers Lost Galaxy	Psycho Blue (voice)	Episode: "To the Tenth Power"
2002	Just Shoot Me!	Club Owner	Episode: "The Boys in the Band"
2003	Uncle Davver's Really Scary Movie Show	Uncle Davver	Also writer
2009–10	The Jay Leno Show	Announcer (voice)	95 episodes
2010–14	The Tonight Show with Jay Leno	Announcer (voice)	7 episodes
2017	Lady Dynamite	Don Jr.	4 episodes
2022	The Rideshare Killer	Reggie Altmari Jr.	Television film

==== Web ====
List of acting performances in web series
Year	Title	Role	Notes
2016	Wacky Wally's Vintage Toys	Himself / Host	YouTube series; 4 episodes Also writer

=== Voice roles ===
==== Film ====
List of voice performances in direct-to-video, feature and television films
Year	Title	Role	Notes
2002	Globehunters: An Around the World in 80 Days Adventure	Raj Kangaroo	
2002	Return to Never Land	Pirates Patrick	
2005	Digimon Frontier: Island of Lost Digimon	Hippo Gryphomon	English dub
2005	Stewie Griffin: The Untold Story	Additional voices	
2006	Final Fantasy VII Advent Children	Rufus Shinra	English dub
2006	The Ant Bully	Wasp #3	
2007	Garfield Gets Real	Jon Arbuckle, Mike	
2008	Space Chimps	Infinity Probe, Splork, Peppy Ham	
2008	Garfield's Fun Fest	Jon Arbuckle	
2008	Bleach: Memories of Nobody	Renji Abarai	English dub
2009	Garfield's Pet Force	Jon Arbuckle, Emperor Jon	
2009	Bleach: The DiamondDust Rebellion	Renji Abarai	English dub
2011	Bleach: Fade to Black	Renji Abarai	English dub
2012	Bleach: Hell Verse	Renji Abarai	English dub
2013	Tiger & Bunny: The Beginning	Kotetsu T. Kaburagi / Wild Tiger	English dub
2015	Tiger & Bunny: The Rising	Kotetsu T. Kaburagi / Wild Tiger	English dub
2016	Alice Through the Looking Glass	Humpty Dumpty	
2016	Batman: Return of the Caped Crusaders	Riddler	
2017	Batman vs. Two-Face	Riddler, King Tut	
2017	Hey Arnold!: The Jungle Movie	Oskar Kokoshka, Mr. Hyunh, Homeless Man #2	
2018	Incredibles 2	Additional voices	
2019	Invader Zim: Enter the Florpus	Almighty Tallest Red	

==== Anime ====
List of voice performances in anime
Year	Title	Role	Notes
2001	Transformers: Robots in Disguise	Side Burn, Mirage	
2002	Tokyo Pig	Dad	Episode: "When Pigs Fly"
2003–05	Initial D	Zak Nakazato	Tokyopop dub
2004–07	Astro Boy	Dr. O'Shay, others	
2005–07	Zatch Bell!	Brago, Praying Mantis Joe, Ruku, Professor Dartagnan, Bari, Bern, Additional Voices	
2005–07	Naruto	Kaiza, Aoba Yamashiro	
2006–14	Bleach	Renji Abarai, Tsubaki, Hospital Hollow	
2007–08	Digimon Data Squad	BanchoLeomon	
2007–14	Naruto: Shippuden	Aoba Yamashiro, Yaoki, Kisuke Maboroshi, Harusame	
2008	Blood+	George Miyagusuku, Amshell, Nathan Mahler	
2010	Kekkaishi	Habuki	
2012–22	Tiger & Bunny	Kotetsu T. Kaburagi / Wild Tiger	
2013	Stitch!	Elastico, Video Narrator	Episode: "Elastico 2.0"
2015–16, 2018	Sailor Moon	Yuuichirou Kumada	Viz Media dub
2019	Boruto: Naruto Next Generations	Kinshiki Otsutsuki	
2021	Baki Hanma	Police Academy Teacher	
2022–present	Bleach: Thousand-Year Blood War	Renji Abarai	

==== Animation ====
List of voice performances in animated shows
Year	Title	Role	Notes	References
1996–03	Dexter's Laboratory	Additional voices		
1998–99	The Angry Beavers	Wolffe D. Wolf		
1998–05	The Powerpuff Girls	Additional voices		
1999	King of the Hill	Curator, Sheriff	Episode: "Love Hurts and So Does Art"	
1999	Rugrats	Goober, Additional voices		
1999–17	Family Guy	Additional voices		
2000–04	Harvey Birdman, Attorney at Law	George Jetson, Various		
2001–03	Invader Zim	Almighty Tallest Red, additional voices		
2003	All Grown Up!	Joe, Jock	Episode: "Bad Kimi"	
2003–05	My Life as a Teenage Robot	Cluster Ambassador, Phone, Abominatron, Hick, Additional voices		
2005	American Dad!	Jay Leno	Episode: "Stan of Arabia: Part 1"	
2005	Higglytown Heroes	Waiter Hero	Episode: "Cry Baby Pookie/Wait for Me"	
2008–15	The Garfield Show	Jon Arbuckle, additional voices		
2009	The Cleveland Show	Man	Episode: "The One About Friends"	
2010	Chowder	Crab, Repo Man, Shouting Dog Guard, Bus Driver	Episode: "The Prank"	
2010–12	The Avengers: Earth's Mightiest Heroes	Hank Pym / Ant-Man / Giant-Man / Yellowjacket, MODOK, Ultron Drones		
2011	The Penguins of Madagascar	Alex the Lion	Episode: "The Return of the Revenge of Dr. Blowhole"	
2014–17	Sonic Boom	Cubot, Nominatus, others		
2015	DC Super Friends	Hal Jordan		
2018	The Epic Tales of Captain Underpants	Additional voices		
2020	Lego Hidden Side: Night of the Harbinger	Vaughn		

==== Video games ====
List of voice performances in video games
Year	Title	Role	Notes
1990	The Secret of Monkey Island	Biff the Ghost, Franklin, Herman Toothrot, Sword Fighter Opponent #1	
1991	Monkey Island 2: LeChuck's Revenge	Herman Toothrot, Potman, Frank, Greg	
1997	Herc's Adventures	Jason, Bronze Guy, Big Soldier	
1997	Popeye and the Quest for the Willy Mammoth	Popeye	
1998	Heretic II	D'Sparil, Dranor, Scout, Ssithar, The Guardian	
1998	Popeye & The Sunken Treasure	Popeye	
1999	Starshot: Space Circus Fever	Wolfgang	
2000	Escape from Monkey Island	Herman Toothrot	
2001	Star Wars: Starfighter	Reti	
2001	Jimmy Neutron: Boy Genius	Carl Wheezer, Carl's Dad, Carl's Mom, Reggie, Yokian Guards, Claw Warrior	Console versions only
2001	Tony Hawk's Pro Skater 3	Pedestrians	
2002	Hot Wheels Velocity X	Gear Head, Meta Cog, Simon "Slick" Deluca	
2002	Maximo: Ghosts to Glory	Maximo, Lord Glutterscum	
2002	Star Wars: Jedi Starfighter	Nym Pilot #3, Reti	
2002	Command & Conquer: Renegade	Nick "Havoc" Parker	
2002	The Mark of Kri	Rau	
2002	Whacked!	Lance	
2002	X-Men: Destiny	Havok	
2002	Tony Hawk's Pro Skater 4	Various voices	
2003	Enter the Matrix	Additional Voices	
2003	Evil Dead: A Fistful of Boomstick	Various voices	
2003	Dino Crisis 3	McCoy	
2003	Tony Hawk's Underground	Ryan Clements, Team Pro Skeezo, Security Nerd	
2003	The Hobbit	Balfor	
2003	Crimson Skies: High Road to Revenge	Big John	
2003	Battlestar Galactica	Paulus	
2004	Maximo vs. Army of Zin	Maximo	
2004	Astro Boy	Dr. O'Shay, Blue Knight	
2004	Tony Hawk's Underground 2	Various voices	
2004	Ty the Tasmanian Tiger 2: Bush Rescue	Carnifex, Red the Blue Healer	
2004	Tales of Symphonia	Lord Remiel	
2004	EverQuest II	Additional voices	
2004	Doom 3	Dr. Cloud	
2005	Zatch Bell! Mamodo Battles	Brago, Bari	
2005	Madagascar	Alex the Lion	
2005	Madagascar Animal Trivia	Alex the Lion	
2005	Quake 4	Various	
2005	Zatch Bell! Mamodo Fury	Brago, Ruku, Bari	
2005	Doom 3: Resurrection of Evil	Dr. Cloud	
2005	Neopets: The Darkest Faerie	Tormund Ellis, Brightvale Guard	
2005–08	Soulcalibur series	Cervantes de Leon	Uncredited
2006	God Hand	Mr. Gold, Mr. Silver, Villains	
2006	Resistance: Fall of Man	Additional voices	
2006–present	Naruto series	Aoba Yamashiro, Mū, Jiryaia	English dub
2006–present	Bleach series	Renji Abarai	English dub
2007	Rogue Galaxy	Dario, Libra King	
2007	Blazing Angels 2	Captain Christopher Roninson	
2007	Ratatouille	Teen Rat, La Marchand Vendor, Frozen Food Company Representative	PSP version
2007	Ratchet & Clank Future: Tools of Destruction	Rusty Pete	
2007	Power Rangers: Super Legends	Icthior, Red Lion Wild Force Ranger	
2007	The Golden Compass	Handsome Jim, Scholar, Tartar	
2008	Ratchet & Clank Future: Quest for Booty	Rusty Pete	
2008	Aion	Additional voices	
2009	Stormrise	Spectre, Enforcer Soldier	
2009	Marvel: Ultimate Alliance 2	Multiple Man, Yellowjacket	
2009	Ratchet & Clank Future: A Crack in Time	Rusty Pete	
2009	Brütal Legend	Sparkies	
2009	Madagascar Kartz	Alex the Lion	
2009	Dragon Age: Origins	Prince Bhelan Aeducan	
2009	Final Fantasy XIII	Cocoon Inhabitants	English dub
2009–24	Batman: Arkham series	Riddler	
2010	White Knight Chronicles	Toad Soldiers, Additional voices	English dub
2010	Kingdom Hearts: Birth by Sleep	Cubby	English dub
2010–present	Sonic the Hedgehog series	Cubot	
2011	Final Fantasy XIII-2	Additional voices	English dub
2011	Super Star Kartz	Alex the Lion	
2011–17	Marvel vs. Capcom series	MODOK	
2012	Armored Core V	Chief	
2012	Kinect Star Wars	Generic Male #1	
2013	Marvel Heroes	Hank Pym, Mister Fantastic, Ikaris	
2014	Lightning Returns: Final Fantasy XIII	Goddess's Disciple, Innkeeper, Outfitters	English dub
2014	Kingdom Hearts HD 2.5 Remix	Cubby	Archived footage; English dub
2014–15	Skylanders series	Threatpack	
2015	Lego Jurassic World	Additional voices	
2015	Disney Infinity 3.0	Time	
2015	Lego Dimensions	Additional voices	
2015	Lego Marvel's Avengers	Doctor Strange, Crimson Dynamo, Mighty Destroyer	
2016	Ghostbusters	Additional voices	
2016	Final Fantasy XV	Additional voices	English dub
2017	LawBreakers	Additional voices	
2018	Lego The Incredibles	Additional voices	
2018	Lego DC Super-Villains	Riddler	
2018	Sea of Thieves	Heckling Pirate	
2019	Marvel Ultimate Alliance 3: The Black Order	MODOK, Mister Fantastic	
2019	Team Sonic Racing	Cubot	
2019	Mario & Sonic at the Olympic Games Tokyo 2020	Tokyo '64 Announcer	Credited under English Voices
2020	Serious Sam 4	General Brand	
2020	Wasteland 3	Elijah Ward, Pistol Pete	
2021	My Loft	Bartley Berg	
2021	Marvel Future Revolution	Hank Pym / Yellowjacket, MODOK	
2021	Call of Duty: Vanguard	Norticus the Conqueror	
2022	Lost Ark	Luttera	
2022	Triangle Strategy	Erador	
2022	Return to Monkey Island	Herman Toothrot	
2023	Street Fighter 6	JP	
2023	Starfield	James Newill, Lucas Drexler	
2025	Digimon Story: Time Stranger	Birdramon	

==== Commercials ====
- H. H. Gregg (2008–2012) - HH (voice)

Media offices
Preceded by Andy Richter	The Tonight Show announcer 2010–2014	Succeeded by Steve Higgins
