= Gyu-Kaku =

Japanese restaurant chain

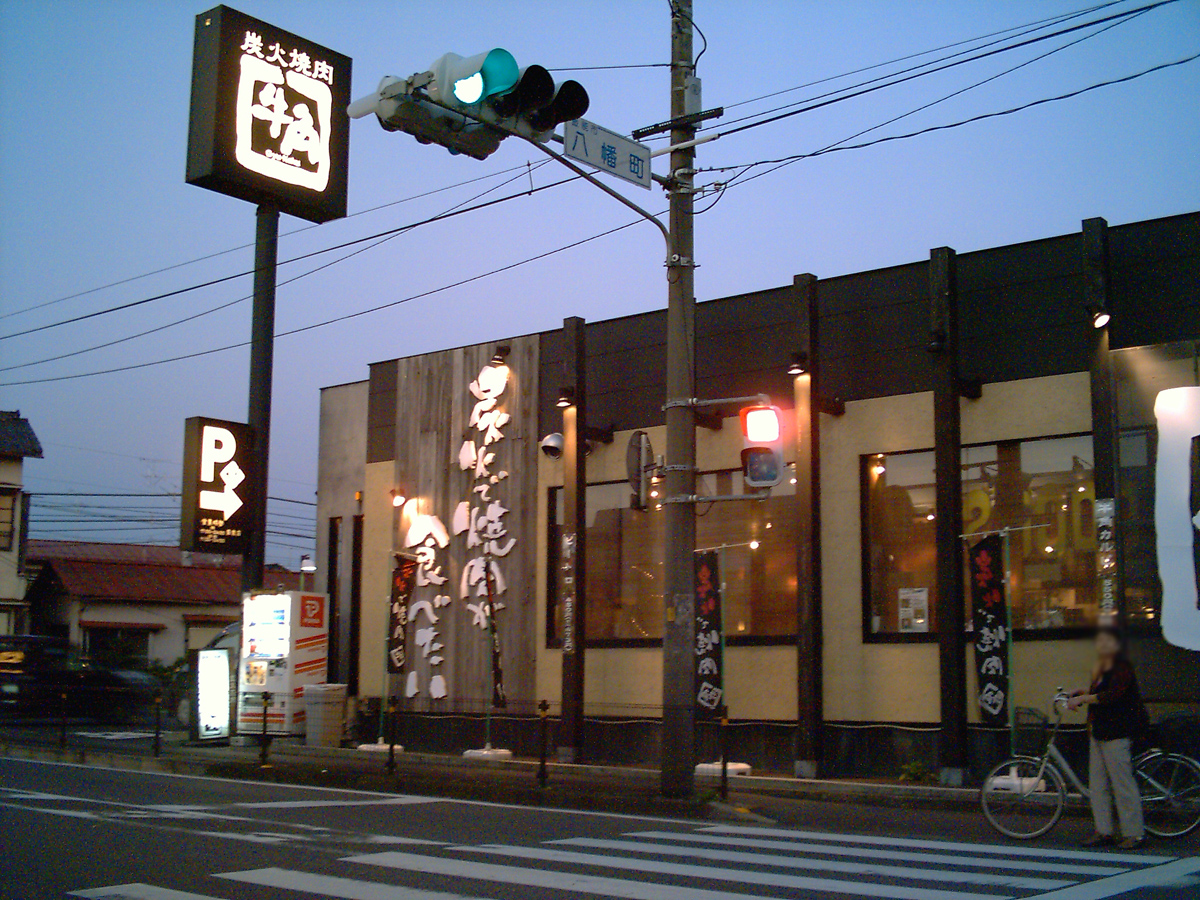
Gyu-Kaku Restaurant in Hanno, Saitama

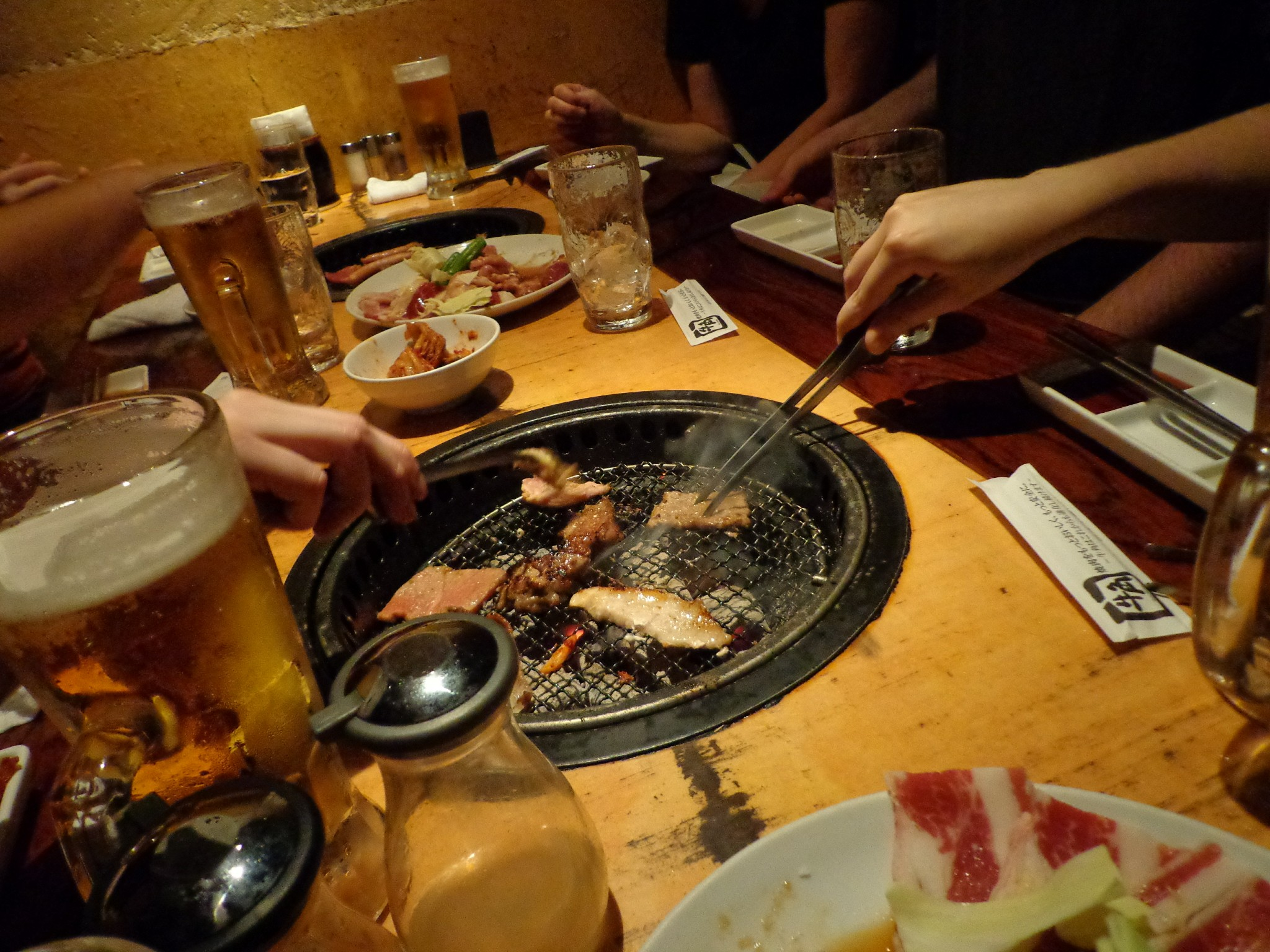

Gyu-Kaku (牛角, gyū kaku; "bull's horn") is a chain of Japanese yakiniku restaurants. The parent company, Reins International (株式会社レインズインターナショナル), has its headquarters in Minatomirai, Nishi-ku, Yokohama.

The U.S. division, Reins International U.S.A. Co. (Ltd), has its headquarters in Torrance, California.

== History ==
Gyu-Kaku first entered the yakiniku restaurant business in 1996 and opened its first franchised restaurant in 1997 after changing to the current name. The first overseas restaurant was opened in the United States in 2001 and the second in Taiwan in 2002.

== Current development ==
There are over six hundred Gyu-Kaku locations in Japan, and locations have also been opened in the United States (including Kansas, New York City, California, New Orleans, Chicago, Austin, Houston, Dallas, Hawaii, Philadelphia, Pittsburgh, Boston, Orlando, Miami, Atlanta, and Cincinnati), Canada, China, Hong Kong, Cambodia, Taiwan, Thailand, Indonesia, Malaysia, Singapore, Vietnam and the Philippines. Though Gyu-Kaku is part of Reins International Inc., every restaurant is different in terms of region and selection availability (i.e. outlets in the United States serve locally sourced USDA beef).

Gyu-Kaku also manufactures and purveys its own brand of kimchi in Japanese supermarkets, and a line of dipping sauces and marinades.

== See also ==
- List of barbecue restaurants
