= Itthipol Mameket =

Thai voice actor

- อิทธิพล มามีเกตุ
- Born: 14 June 1972 (age 54); Thailand
- Occupation: Voice actor
- Years active: 1996–present
- Known for: Thai voices of Luffy and Lelouch

Itthipol Mameket (Thai: อิทธิพล มามีเกตุ) is a Thai voice actor. His notable roles include Athrun Zala in Gundam Seed, Monkey D. Luffy in One Piece, Lelouch in Code Geass, and Mantaro Kinniku in Kinnikuman Nisei, where he also sung a Thai version of the "Karubidon Ondo" (เพลงข้าวหน้าเนื้อ) song.

== Filmography ==
=== Voice over roles ===
==== Anime dubbing ====
- Weiß Kreuz (UBC dub) - Aya Fujimiya
- Cheeky Angel (UBC dub) - Genzō Soga
- Tokyo Underground (UBC dub) - Rumina Asagi
- Inuyasha (Channel 9 dub) - Miroku
- Saint Seiya: The Lost Canvas (Channel 9 dub) - Alone, El cid
- Detective Conan (Channel 9 dub) - Wataru Takagi, Hiroshi Agasa, Supporting Characters
- Rockman EXE (Channel 9 dub) - Blues
- The Prince of Tennis (Channel 9 dub) - Takeshi Momoshiro, Eiji Kikumaru
- Zatch Bell! - Kiyo Takamine
- Corrector Yui - I.R.
- Sailor Moon (Channel 9 dub, rerun on air 2012) - Nephrite
- Fighting Spirit (Channel 9 dub) - Ichirō Miyata
- Inazuma Eleven (Channel 9 dub) - Yūto Kidō
- Fairy Tail (Channel 9 dub) - Natsu Dragneel
- Cardcaptor Sakura - Toya Kinomoto
- Tokyo Mew Mew - Masaya Aoyama, Keiichiro Akasaka
- Tenjho Tenge - Souichiro Nagi
- School Rumble - Kenji Harima
- The Mythical Detective Loki Ragnarok - Narugami
- Fruits Basket - Kyo Sohma
- Shin Mazinger Shougeki! Z Hen - Koji Kabuto
- Saint Seiya - Pegasus Seiya, Scorpio Milo
- Mobile Suit Gundam SEED - Athrun Zala, Orga Sabnak
- Mobile Suit Gundam SEED Destiny - Athrun Zala, Andrew Waltfeld
- Mobile Suit Gundam 00 - Allelujah Haptism, Saji Crossroad
- Mobile Suit Gundam AGE - Woolf Enneacle, Zeheart Galette
- Mobile Suit Gundam: Iron-Blooded Orphans - Orga Itsuka, Ein Dalton
- Yakitate!! Japan - Ryou Kuroyanagi, Pierrot Bolneze
- Kinnikuman Nisei - Mantaro Kinniku, Brocken Jr., Harabote Muscle
- Tiger & Bunny - Kotetsu T. Kaburagi/Wild Tiger
- Slam Dunk (Dream Express dub) - Hanamichi Sakuragi
- Code Geass - Lelouch Lamperouge, Lloyd Asplund
- Eureka Seven - Matthieu, Lieutenant Dominic Sorel
- One Piece - Monkey D. Luffy
- Highschool of the Dead - Kohta Hirano
- Working!! - Hiroomi Sōma
- Neon Genesis Evangelion (Dream Express dub) - Kaworu Nagisa
- JoJo's Bizarre Adventure - Dio Brando
- Demon Slayer: Kimetsu no Yaiba - Muzan Kibutsuji, Sanemi Shinazugawa, Hotaru Haganezuka

==== Tokusatsu dubbing ====
- Ultraman Gaia - Michifumi Inoue, Katsumi Kajio
- Kamen Rider Ryuki - Takeshi Asakura
- Kamen Rider 555 - Masato Kusaka
- Kamen Rider Blade - Hajime Aikawa
- Kamen Rider Hibiki - Hitoshi Hidaka
- Kamen Rider Kabuto - Arata Kagami
- Kamen Rider Den-O - Momotaros
- Kamen Rider Kiva - Otoya Kurenai
- Kamen Rider Decade - Yusuke Onodera
- Kamen Rider W - Shotaro Hidari
- Kamen Rider Fourze - Ryusei Sakuta
- Kamen Rider Drive - Shinnosuke Tomari
- Kamen Rider Ex-Aid - Hiiro Kagami
- Kamen Rider Build - Sento Kiryu
- Kamen Rider Zi-O - Swartz, Mondo Douan
- K-tai Investigator 7 - Keita Amishima
- Kaitou Sentai Lupinranger VS Keisatsu Sentai Patranger - Keiichiro Asaka

==== TV series dubbing ====
- Densha Otoko (Thai PBS dub)
- D.I.E. (Channel 3 dub)

==== Film dubbing ====
- Ratatouille - Emile
- Despicable Me - Gru
- Despicable Me 2 - Gru
- Minions - Young Gru
- Despicable Me 3 - Gru
- Avatar - Tsu'tey (Laz Alonso)
- The Chronicles of Narnia: The Lion, the Witch and the Wardrobe - Peter Pevensie (William Moseley)
- I Think I Love My Wife - Richard Cooper (Chris Rock)
- Inception - Arthur (Joseph Gordon-Levitt)
- X-Men: First Class - Azazel (Jason Flemyng)
- Ice Age: Dawn of the Dinosaurs - Buck

==== TV program dubbing ====
- Sponge (Modernine TV dub) - Narrator
- Clever! – Die Show, die Wissen schafft/Mega Clever (Channel 9 dub) - Wigald Boning
- Kasou Taishou (Channel 9 dub) - Kinichi Hagimoto

==== Fandub ====
- Genshin Impact - Dottore (Uploaded in TANUDAN's Youtube Channel) (Note: Not in an official video game in Thai version.)
