= Rage of Bahamut (TV series) =

Japanese anime television series

- Blu-ray cover art of the first volume (Genesis)

神撃のバハムート (Shingeki no Bahamūto)
- Genre: Adventure, dark fantasy
- Created by: Cygames
- Anime television series

Rage of Bahamut: Genesis
- Directed by: Keiichi Sato
- Produced by: Yuito Kimura
- Written by: Keiichi Hasegawa
- Music by: Yoshihiro Ike
- Studio: MAPPA
- Licensed by: Crunchyroll (Note: In North America through Crunchyroll, LLC (formerly known as Funimation).); AUS: Universal/Sony; UK: Anime Limited; SA/SEA: Muse Communication
- Original network: Sun TV, Tokyo MX, KBS, TV Aichi, AT-X, BS11, STS
- English network: SEA: Animax Asia
- Original run: October 6, 2014 – December 29, 2014
- Episodes: 12
- Manga

Shingeki no Bahamut: Twin Heads
- Written by: Takamaru Semikawa
- Illustrated by: Ryota-H
- Published by: Cygames
- Magazine: Cycomics
- Original run: August 21, 2016 – August 20, 2017
- Volumes: 3
- Manga

Bahari MAX
- Illustrated by: Ponkichi
- Published by: Cygames
- Magazine: Cycomics
- Original run: August 28, 2016 – January 29, 2017
- Anime television series

Rage of Bahamut: Virgin Soul
- Directed by: Keiichi Sato
- Produced by: Nobuhiro Takenaka; Manabu Ōtsuka
- Written by: Shizuka Ōishi
- Music by: Yoshihiro Ike
- Studio: MAPPA
- Licensed by: Amazon Prime Video (expired)
- Original network: MBS, TBS, CBC TV, BS-TBS, STS
- Original run: April 7, 2017 – September 29, 2017
- Episodes: 24
- See also
- Manaria Friends

Rage of Bahamut (Japanese: 神撃のバハムート, Hepburn: Shingeki no Bahamūto) is a Japanese anime television series produced by MAPPA that is based on the Rage of Bahamut game. The series was directed by Keiichi Sato and written by Keiichi Hasegawa, featuring character designs by Naoyuki Onda and music by Yoshihiro Ike.

The first season, titled Rage of Bahamut: Genesis (神撃のバハムート GENESIS, Shingeki no Bahamūto: Jeneshisu), consists of 12 episodes aired between October 6, 2014, and December 29, 2014. It has been licensed for streaming in North America by Funimation. A second season, titled Rage of Bahamut: Virgin Soul (神撃のバハムート VIRGIN SOUL, Shingeki no Bahamūto: Bājin Souru), was announced on May 6, 2015, at the series' orchestra concert event. It consists of 24 episodes aired between April 7, 2017, and September 29, 2017. Amazon Prime Video exclusively streamed the second season in the United States and in the United Kingdom. The streaming in the United States was originally part of the now defunct Anime Strike service.

A spin-off series, titled Manaria Friends, was released in 2019. It is also based on the Rage of Bahamut social game.

== Plot ==
Mistarcia is a magical world where humans, gods, and demons mingle together. In the past, the black-and-silver winged demon beast Bahamut had threatened to destroy the land, but humans, gods, and demons overcame their differences to fight together and sealed its power. The key to that seal was split in two, one half given to the gods and the other to demons, so that they would never be united and Bahamut never released. Now, two thousand years later, the world is in an era of peace until the day a woman named Amira appears with the gods' half of the key. With an apparent loss of memory, she searches for her lost mother and is assisted by the bounty hunters Favaro Leone and Kaisar Lidfard. Their quest is part of a larger story of an epic clash between humans, gods and demons, between those who want to revive Bahamut and those who are trying to prevent it.

== Characters ==
=== Rage of Bahamut: Genesis ===
Favaro Leone (ファバロ・レオーネ, Favaro Reōne)
Voiced by: Hiroyuki Yoshino (Japanese); Ian Sinclair (English)
A bounty hunter with an orange afro. The son of a bandit leader, he refused to take leadership upon his father's death, who was later revealed to have been killed by the fallen angel Azazel. He was the first to meet Amira who gives him a demon tail to force him to take her to Helhiem. He unknowingly falls in love with her, but eventually kills her to prevent Bahamut's revival. His disciple Nina Drango appears in Virgin Soul.
Kaisar Lidfard (カイザル・リドファルド, Kaizaru Ridofarudo)
Voiced by: Go Inoue (Japanese); Chris Rager (English)
Kaisar is Favaro's nemesis and a bounty hunter. He believes that his family's honor and knighthood was stripped because of Favaro however Azazel was behind the downfall death of both their parents. He remains loyal in his conduct and behavior which often leads him to unfavorable situations. He met Amira while chasing Favaro and then decided to follow the duo, attracted by Amira's angelic beauty. His honor was later restored and he was dubbed as an Orleans Knight by Charioce XIII. He joins with Favaro and his companions to prevent Bahamut's revival. He is also good friends with Rita and is oblivious to the fact that she is attracted to him.
Amira (アーミラ, Āmira)
Voiced by: Risa Shimizu (Japanese); Tia Ballard (English)
A pink-haired woman. She has the powers of a demon and is unknowingly the creation of Belzebuth and is half god and half demon. She enlists Favaro's aid to guide her to Helheim in search of her lost mother who is a fallen angel. She then joins with Favaro and his companions to prevent Bahamut's revival, but unknowingly holds the key to unlocking the seal restraining the beast. She learns that her origins are far more deceitful and complex than what remain in her memories. She sacrifices herself to prevent Bahamut's revival although her final kiss to Favaro hints that she has reciprocal affection for him.
Rita (リタ)
Voiced by: Miyuki Sawashiro (Japanese); Apphia Yu (English)
She is more than 200 years old, but has the appearance of a young girl with a dark and aloof nature. She is a skilled necromancer with great knowledge about medical treatment. She can manipulate all species upon their deaths and can command the dead. She developed feelings for Kaisar following a serious talk about their past. She rarely shows her emotions and hides them with sarcastic and sometimes uninterested remarks. She is also particularly close to Nina, Mugaro and Azazel which gives her neutral affiliations to Gods, Demons and Humans. She joins with Favaro and his companions to prevent Bahamut's revival.
Lavalley (ラヴァレイ, Ravarei)
Voiced by: Hiroaki Hirata (Japanese); Tyson Rinehart (English)
He is the Vice-Captain of the Orleans Knights under Jeanne D'arc and King Charioce XIII. He says that he is Amira's father and tells her about her mother. He says that he is associated with Amira's teacher Martinet and that the two were requested by Nicole to guide Amira to reunite with her. In fact his real identity is Gilles de Rais, a ruthless sorcerer.
Jeanne D'arc (ジャンヌ・ダルク, Jan'nu Daruku)
Voiced by: Megumi Han (Japanese); Jad Saxton (English)
She is a knight who is blessed by the Archangel Michael. She was a simple farm girl who received a divine calling and became Captain of the Orleans Knights. She wields the Holy Lance Maltet and her leadership gave the Orleans knights the highest honor in the kingdom. After winning the first battle against Azazel and his legion of demons, Archangel Michael acknowledges her as the worthy human to be a vessel of the Gods and bestowed her of the holy sword Précieuse, a mystical sword that balances the Dark and Holy and so powerful it can erase the existence of any foe it strikes. This incites the jealousy of the king who later accuses her of treason and orders her to be publicly executed. Thinking that she was abandoned by the angels, she accepts Martinet's temptations to be transformed into a demon. She is later returned to normal after Michael gives her an antidote.
Bacchus (バッカス, Bakkasu)
Voiced by: Hiroshi Iwasaki (Japanese); Brian Mathis (English)
He is a God who decided to leave the land of the Gods and live freely among the human race, loving alcoholic beverages. He runs the bounty hunting business with the help of his companion Hamsa, and tends to avoid unnecessary conflict which often leads to the dismay and anger of his peers. He seems to know a great deal, such as the first unity of all Races against Bahamut as well as the backgrounds of individuals like Favaro and Kaisar, and the truth behind the sealing of the all powerful beast.
Hamsa (ハンサ, Hansa)
Voiced by: Showtaro Morikubo (Japanese); Kyle Phillips (English)
Hamsa is the reincarnation of a god that inexplicably has taken the appearance of a duck and has the ability to transform into a bird big enough to carry humans.
Azazel (アザゼル, Azazeru)
Voiced by: Masakazu Morita (Japanese); Kent Williams (English)
He is a fallen angel and is second in command of the chief, Lucifer. He was tasked with locating Amira and the God Key, and almost killed by his master Belzebuth. In Virgin Soul, he lives in the Royal Capital Anatae and works for the demon funeral home, but is also the Rag Demon, plotting against the king and killing humans who treated demons inhumanely.
Cerberus (ケルベロス, Keruberosu)
Voiced by: Eri Kitamura (Japanese); Leah Clark (English)
She is a demon and the Guard Dog of Hades and accompanies Azazel on his quest to find out who is behind the theft of the God Key. In Virgin Soul, she works in a brothel in the capital along with other attractive demons in order to survive.
Pazuzu (パズズ)
Voiced by: Tsuyoshi Koyama (Japanese); Brandon Potter (English)
He is a demon that accompanies Azazel on his quest to find out who is behind the theft of the God Key.
Gabriel (ガブリエル, Gaburieru)
Voiced by: Ayumi Fujimura (Japanese); Alexis Tipton (English)
She is one of the four known archangels and has been the leader of the angels ever since the death of Zeus.
Michael (ミカエル, Mikaeru)
Voiced by: Shouta Aoi (Japanese); Micah Solusod (English)
He is an archangel and the one who sent Jeanne d'Arc to search of Amira.
Raphael (ラファエル, Rafaeru)
Voiced by: Ayumi Tsuji (Japanese); Brina Palencia (English)
She is one of the four known archangels.
Uriel (ウリエル, Urieru)
Voiced by: Eri Ozeki (Japanese); Trina Nishimura (English)
She is one of the four known archangels.
Charioce XIII (シャリオス13世, Shariosu 13-sei)
Voiced by: Tesshō Genda (Japanese); Barry Yandell (English)
He is the king of Orleans residing in the capital, Anatae. In a fit of jealousy at seemingly being spurned by the angels, he ordered Jeanne d'Arc to be burned at the stake.
Martinet (マルチネ, Maruchine)
Voiced by: Kenjiro Tsuda (Japanese); Christopher R. Sabat (English)
He is Belzebuth's attendant, but his real identity is Gilles de Rais a ruthless sorcerer, who tricked angels, demons and humans in order to revive Bahamut. As Martinet, he was Belzebuth's attendant and as Lavalley, he was a member of the Orleans Knights.
Lucifer (ルシフェル, Rushiferu)
Voiced by: Takahiro Sakurai (Japanese); Todd Haberkorn (English)
He is the very powerful leader of the demons and the highest ranking fallen angel.
Belzebuth (ベルゼビュート, Beruzebyūto)
Voiced by: Ryūzaburō Ōtomo (Japanese); Vic Mignogna (English)
He is a very powerful demon and the creator of Amira. He secretly plotted behind Lucifer to bring about Bahamut's revival.

=== Rage of Bahamut: Virgin Soul ===
Nina Drango (ニーナ・ドランゴ, Nīna Dorango)
Voiced by: Sumire Morohoshi
She is a bounty hunter and pupil of Leone Favaro who has come to Anatae to make a living. The citizens of the capital love her happy-go-lucky personality. Nina was born to a dragon father and a human mother, has superhuman strength and can transform into a red dragon, sometimes unwillingly in the presence of handsome young men. She falls in love with Charioce XVII whom she met as the young man Chris.
Charioce XVII (シャリオス17世, Shariosu 17-sei)
Voiced by: Yuichiro Umehara
He was born to a commoner concubine of the former king and becomes a calculating king willing to resort to any measure that furthers his secret goal to release and kill Bahamut. He fears neither god nor demon and wields forbidden power stolen from the gods. He unwillingly falls in love with Nina whom he first encounters while disguised as the commoner, Chris.
Sofiel (ソフィエル, Sofieru)
Voiced by: Maaya Sakamoto
She is an angel serving Gabriel, but also helps Jeanne D'arc travel to the capital city of Anatae to find her son, El.
Mugaro/El (ムガロ)
Voiced by: Rie Kugimiya
El is the young son of Jeanne D'arc but is separated when they are hunted by the Onyx Knights. He finds help and safety with the fallen angel Azazel who names him Mugaro, thinking he is a girl. He is regarded as the Holy Child and has the ability to neutralize the power of the green stones worn by the Onyx Knights.
Dias Bardolomew (ディアス・バルドロメウ, Diasu Barutoromeu)
Voiced by: Yasuhiro Mamiya
He is second in command of the Orleans Knights and remains loyal to Captain Kaisar Lidfard after he is denounced by King Charioce XVII.
Alessand Visponti (アレサンド･ヴィスポンティ, Aresando Visuponti)
Voiced by: Kenshō Ono
He is a young officer in the Orleans Knights whose his noble birth secured a place within the order. He feels betrayed by the actions of Captain Kaisar Lidfard and kills El to gain a place in the Onyx Knights.
Onyx Task Force Captain (漆黒兵隊長, Shikkoku Heitaichō)
Voiced by: Hiroshi Shirokuma
He is the leader of the Onyx Knights, and like them he has a green stone embedded in his chest which grants super-human powers in exchange for slowly draining his life force.

== Anime ==
The anime is directed by Keiichi Sato, with series composition by Keiichi Hasegawa, character designs by Naoyuki Onda and music by Yoshihiro Ike.
