= Henry Dittman =

American actor

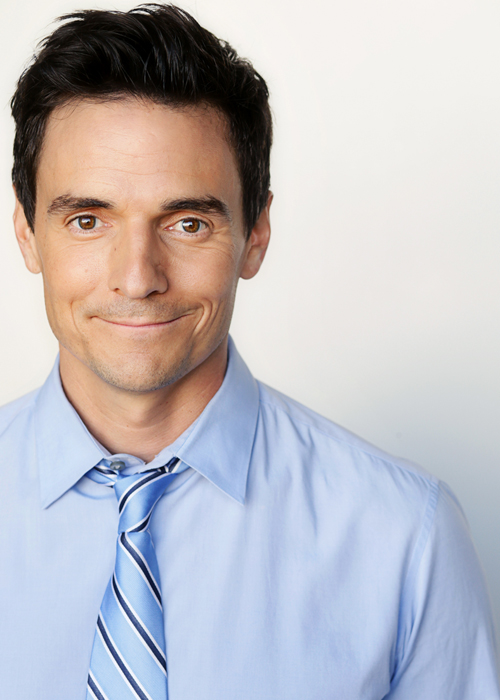
- Born: December 13, 1971 (age 54); Los Angeles, California, U.S.
- Education: University of Mississippi (BFA)
- Occupations: Actor; television host
- Agent: TGMD
- Spouse: Sarah McElligott (m. 2011)
- Children: 2

Henry Dittman (born December 13, 1971) is an American actor and television host.

== History ==
He has performed on TV shows such as Entourage, Brothers & Sisters, Good Luck Charlie, Two and a Half Men, Naruto, Party Down, and Higglytown Heroes, as well as being a contributing writer and regular performer on The Chris Wylde Show Starring Chris Wylde on Comedy Central and a recurring sketch player on The Wanda Sykes Show and The Pete Holmes Show.

As a host, he co-produced and hosted The Smart Show, a travel show, for two seasons. He has interviewed such stars as Tommy Lasorda, Mena Suvari, Marla Sokoloff, Marley Shelton, and Ahmed Best, among others. Previously he hosted 50 episodes of Before & After'noon Movie on the USA Network. Before that, he was the first host of My Music Channel, a digital cable music video channel sponsored by AOL for Broadband, and the host of Cartoon Network’s live action pilot Fridays, as well as hosting pilots for Fox Reality Channel & E!, and appearing as a regular panelist on Hollywood's Top Ten for ReelzChannel. Henry hosts the longest running Los Angeles Clippers podcast ClipCast with Chris Wylde.

He is also one of five characters in the Japanese beer campaign for Kirin Beer, which filmed in Japan, Saipan, England & New Zealand. Other commercial campaigns include Go Daddy as the jerk agent to Danika Patrick, Kayak.com as a moronic traveler who buys rice flour that looks like cocaine, United States Postal Service as an over-caffeinated coffee distributor, and Hyundai Motor Company as a Tony-Robbins-style motivational speaker.

As a voice actor, Dittman is known to anime fans as the voice of Kabuto Yakushi on the hit show Naruto. He also plays Kafk Sunbeam on Zatch Bell! as well as lending his voice to a half-dozen pilots and web series for Fox Broadcasting Company's online entertainment sites.

On stage in 2011, Henry won the Los Angeles Ovation Awards as well as the LA Weekly Theater Award for his work in Watson: The Last Great Tale of the Legendary Sherlock Holmes at Sacred Fools Theatre Company, Los Angeles; in 2010 he appeared in the Taylor Hackford directed Geffen Playhouse production of Louis and Keely: Live at the Sahara as Frank Sinatra.

== Personal life ==
In his spare time, Dittman goes on regular trips up and down the California Coast, surfing. The son of a military father, he has lived from Goose Bay, Canada to the Deep South to Guam, and has visited most of Europe, Southeast Asia, New Zealand and North America.

In 1996, he received his BFA in Acting and Directing from the University of Mississippi in Oxford, Mississippi.

== Filmography ==
=== Live-action roles ===
- 100 Things to Do Before High School - Mr. Martin
- Apocalypse Goals - Sid Sr.
- Breaking Up with Shannen Doherty
- Brothers & Sisters – Date #3
- Boppin' at the Glue Factory – Eric Labudde
- Crossing Jordan – Kyle Millhouse
- Entourage – Medic
- Felicity – Doug
- Good Luck Charlie – Dr. Karp
- Greek – Sports Analyst
- H8R
- Hang Time – Kevin
- Hearthstone "Mulligans" web series – Uther
- Hollywood's Top Ten
- Knots (lead opposite Illeana Douglas)
- Lost Everything – Jay
- Monk – Second Fan
- Open Gate (lead opposite Tyler Hoechlin) – Jeb
- Party Down – Denni
- The Beach Party at the Threshold of Hell – Sue Biographer
- The Lamentable Tragedy of Scott – Scott
- The Swidge – Andrew
- The Wanda Sykes Show – Business Man
- Two and a Half Men – Man
- Zeke and Luther – Sumner Hathaway
- Zoey 101 – Mr. Toplin

=== Voiceover roles ===
- Boruto: Naruto Next Generations - Kabuto Yakushi
- Cars: Mater-National Championship – Count Spatula (uncredited)
- Cars: Race-O-Rama – Count Spatula
- Digimon Data Squad (2007) – Craniamon
- Final Fantasy XIII-2 – Various voices
- Freedom Fighters (2003) – Various voices
- Higglytown Heroes (2005–2007) – Multiple guest-starring roles, sign language interpreter hero
- Lost: The Final Season - Beginning of the End – Narrator (ABC)
- Lost Survival Guide (2008) – Narrator (ABC)
- Naruto television series and video games – Kabuto Yakushi, Kakkou
- Naruto: Shippuden (2009) – Kabuto Yakushi
- Neon Genesis Evangelion – Additional voices (Netflix re-dub)
- The End of Evangelion – Council Member C (Netflix re-dub)
- Super Drags (2018) – Robert
- Xenosaga Episode II: Jenseits von Gut und Böse (2004) – Tony
- Xenosaga Episode III: Also sprach Zarathustra (2006) – Tony
- Zatch Bell! (2006) – Kafk Sunbeam
- Tiger & Bunny: The Rising (2014) – Golden Ryan
- Tiger & Bunny Season 2 (2022) – Golden Ryan

== Awards and nominations ==
Ovation Awards

- 2011: Won the award for Lead Actor in a Musical for the role of James Moriarty in the Sacred Fools Theatre Company production of Watson – The Last Great Tale of the Legendary Sherlock Holmes
