= Tiger & Bunny: The Rising =

2015 anime film directed by Katsuyuki Motohiro

- Official poster

Japanese name
- Kanji: 劇場版 TIGER & BUNNY -The Rising-
Transcriptions
- Revised Hepburn: Gekijōban Taigā ando Banī -The Rising-
- Directed by: Yoshitomo Yonetani
- Screenplay by: Yoshihiro Ike
- Starring: Hiroaki Hirata; Masakazu Morita
- Production company: Sunrise (Note: As of 2014, the copyright for this work was transferred to Bandai Namco Pictures.)
- Distributed by: Shochiku; T-JOY
- Release date: February 8, 2014
- Running time: 90 minutes
- Country: Japan
- Language: Japanese

Tiger & Bunny: The Rising (Japanese: 劇場版 TIGER & BUNNY -The Rising-, Hepburn: Gekijōban Taigā ando Banī -The Rising-) is a 2014 superhero anime film released by Sunrise. The film is a sequel to the anime television series Tiger & Bunny. It focuses on Kotetsu T. Kaburagi, who loses his position as a superhero and is replaced with Ryan Goldsmith. As this happens, a new threat appears in the city.

== Plot ==
Taking place following the epilogue of episode 25, the people (aware of Tiger's identity as Kotetsu) of Stern Bild prepare to celebrate Justice Day, where a goddess brought justice to the people centuries earlier after bringing calamity to force the corrupt people to repent. Meanwhile, Apollon Media is bought by its new owner Mark Schneider, and to make some needed changes, he learns the hero division (specifically the Second League) is losing profits. As the Second League heroes poorly chase a purse snatcher, Barnaby arrives and swiftly ends the chase after Tigers crashes into a warehouse. While the main heroes stop a bank robbery, and Rock Bison is seen struggling to make it during the season (i.e. copying Sky High's signature pose, or Origami's photo-bomb style), Barnaby wants to go back to the First League so his abilities would be put to better use. Afterwards, Tiger & Bunny are called in by Schneider to be promoted back to the First League right away. At the promotion ceremony Barnaby is spotlighted, and when everyone else expects Kotetsu to appear, Schneider reveals he hired another hero, Golden Ryan, to replace him as he views Wild Tiger as past his prime. Kotetsu doesn't fight this decision as he doesn't want to hold Barnaby back from returning to the First League. On their first mission together, Ryan & Barnaby successfully keep a toppling tower from falling, but Ryan's use of his gravity powers kept the other heroes from helping at all.

The next day, Schneider has his secretary Virgil inform the Second Leaguers that the Board of Directors have cancelled their airtime segment. When the main heroes take a day off and reflect, Kaede calls Karina (Blue Rose) for a favor to help cheer up Kotetsu. The morning after, another strange occurrence happens on a bridge with witness statements pointing to the Legend of the Goddess. Upon hearing the howling sound from before, the heroes split into three groups and encounter three NEXTs: Richard Max, a hypersonic howler-boxer; Kasha Graham, a belly-dancer illusionist; and Priest Johnny Wong, an elderly man who puts people into nightmare comas. Fire Emblem encounters the elderly man, and is sent into a coma and forced to relive when he struggled to come to terms with his sexuality and gender identity during his childhood. The dream causes his powers to let loose uncontrolled forcing Blue Rose to stay by and keep the fire from spreading. As Ryan is from overseas and unfamiliar with the Legend of the Goddess, he is told the legend ends with the city being plunged into a cavernous abyss (which Barnaby thinks Ryan's powers may cause) and that very day is tomorrow. Kotetsu later visits Fire Emblem, where he is lectured by Blue Rose about Barnaby still following his ideals as he is using his increased pay to give local orphans a fun time at the festival.

It's the day of the festival and Kotetsu's family comes to visit as Kaede got tickets from Blue Rose as the favor she asked. By the time of the evening parade, Kaede convinces Kotetsu to continue being a hero as it is what he wants and it makes him happy. During the parade the three NEXTs from earlier cause an implosion under the street where the parade is being held- thus causing the final act of the Goddess- and Ryan asking if Barnaby suspected him. Kotetsu goes back to the hospital with piles of fire extinguishers to allow Blue Rose to give backup to the other heroes. The three NEXTs face off against the same heroes from earlier: Blue Rose & Dragon Kid v Wong, Sky High & Rock Bison & Origami Cyclone v Max, and Ryan & Barnaby v Kasha. As the heroes battle, Schneider is abducted by a monster robot and Agnes takes this chance to reinstate Wild Tiger to rescue him. Tiger uses his grapnel line to latch onto the machine taking Schneider, and is dragged across the city.

While fighting Wong, Dragon Kid proclaims that Fire Emblem is the greatest person she knows and is both kind and strong. Upon hearing this via TV, Fire Emblem wakes up and rushes to aid Blue Rose & Dragon Kid, leading to a combined win. Origami retreats from fighting Max, only to return after having copied the form of a parade performer dress as a reverberator, allowing Sky High & Rock Bison to go for the knock out. Ryan tells Barnaby to head into a narrow pass where Ryan vertically extends his gravity field to neutralize Kasha as she follows. After beating Kasha, Tiger is saved by Barnaby just in time as Lunatic appears trying to end Schneider. Tiger stalls Lunatic while Ryan & Barnaby tail the machine taking Schneider to the port. After Ryan grounds the machine, it is revealed to have been Schneider's secretary Virgil this whole time. He explains his real name is Andrew Scott, and he infiltrated Schneider's company to plan revenge for him killing his father and making it look like a suicide to hide the illegal activities. The other three NEXTs sided with Andrew for revenge as well: Richard Max lost his boxing league, Kasha Graham (who used her NEXT abilities as an entertainer) lost her cabaret business and Johnny Wong (who was a Monk) lost his temple which Schneider demolished.

Andrew tries to ask Barnaby to see his side of things, but Barnaby has since moved on from wanting revenge and wants to prevent Andrew from killing Schneider to save him from himself. Andrew uses his NEXT powers to create a gigantic mecha-crab, which Barnaby holds at bay until his powers recharge and tries to reason with Andrew. Meanwhile, Tiger and Lunatic battle until they land on a blimp where Lunatic kicks Tiger off and into the fray with Barnaby. Tiger & Bunny reunite to hold off Andrew until the other heroes arrive, which gives Barnaby the time to finish recharging his powers. Tiger & Bunny, now using 100 Power, defeat Andrew in the 1 minute limit of Tiger's powers in grand spectacle. At dawn, Tiger & Bunny are celebrated for their in-sync come back and are asked if Tiger will return for good. Tiger worries his 1 minute time limit may not make him a true hero anymore, until citizens start chanting for Tiger across the news feeds that he is their hero. Agnes, now given authority on hero participation, fully reinstates Tiger and allows their partnership again, which the duo prominently display to the masses.

Following their victory, the main heroes work on the cleanup effort, Andrew and his cohorts adjust to prison rehabilitation very well, the Second League is fully reinstated, Schneider is convicted for his crimes, Kaede continues to develop her powers, and Ryan is offered a larger salary from an overseas business and leaves. In a post credits scene, Tiger asks if he can drive for once; with Barnaby snapping back "no."

== Voice cast ==
Character	Japanese voice actor	English voice actor
Kotetsu T. Kaburagi / Wild Tiger	Hiroaki Hirata	Wally Wingert
Barnaby Brooks Jr.	Masakazu Morita	Yuri Lowenthal
Ryan Goldsmith / Golden Ryan	Yuichi Nakamura	Henry Dittman
Mark Schneider	Hōchū Ōtsuka	Sam Riegel
Karina Lyle / Blue Rose	Minako Kotobuki	Kari Wahlgren
Nathan Seymour / Fire Emblem	Kenjiro Tsuda	John Eric Bentley
Antonio Lopez / Rock Bison	Taiten Kusunoki	Travis Willingham
Keith Goodman / Sky High	Go Inoue	Patrick Seitz
Pao-Lin Huang / Dragon Kid	Mariya Ise	Laura Bailey
Ivan Karelin / Origami Cyclone	Nobuhiko Okamoto	Michael Sinterniklaas
Agnes Joubert	Yūko Kaida	Tara Platt
Andrew Scott / Virgil Dingfelder	Daisuke Hirakawa	Crispin Freeman
Yuri Petrov / Lunatic	Kōji Yusa	Liam O'Brien
Richard Max	Rikiya Koyama	Matthew Mercer
Kasha Graham	Nana Mizuki	Cristina Valenzuela
Johnny Wong	Mugihito	Michael McConnohie
Alexander Lloyds	Wataru Yokojima	Daran Norris
Ben Jackson	Katsuhisa Hoki	Beau Billingslea
Doc Saito	Hiroshi Iwasaki	Dave Wittenberg
Kaede Kaburagi	Rina Hidaka	Eden Riegel
Cain Morris	Kiyoshi Katsunuma	Keith Silverstein
Mary Rose	Riho Fushida	Laura Bailey
Mario	Shinichiro Ohta	Daran Norris
Muramasa Kaburagi	Masahiko Tanaka	Kirk Thornton
Anju Kaburagi	Sayuri Sadaoka	TBA
Ms. Violet	Toshimi Kanno	Tara Sands
Bombeman	Yu Hayashi	TBA
Sumo Thunder	Takahiro Miyamoto	TBA
Chopman	Yu Seki	TBA

== Production ==
The production of two films based on the series was announced during a special event on November 13, 2011. The first film, titled Tiger & Bunny: The Beginning was released in Japan on September 22, 2012, also receiving screenings in the United States, the United Kingdom and other countries, and was released on Blu-ray-Disc and DVD on February 22, 2013. The first half of the film recaps the first few episodes whilst also introducing a new story. A second film, Tiger & Bunny: The Rising, is an entirely new work which was released on February 8, 2014. The second movie also takes place about a year after the anime finale, so sometime around the epilogue, with Kotetsu's identity now public, and Tiger & Bunny return to their team dynamic.

== Reception ==
The Rising earned ¥130,479,900 on its opening in Japan and sold 73,716 tickets, earning the 3rd place in the box office. By March, the movie fell to 12th position, earning ¥540,798 (US$240,083) on 92 screens for a new total of ¥619,543,407. Upon its release, the Blu-ray sold a total of 23,533 units in Japan, topping charts, while the DVD remained second with a total of 6,736 units behind The Wind Rises. The movie also won the "Animation of the Year: Anime Fan Award" in the 2015 Tokyo Anime Award Festival.

IndieWire praised how despite taking place after the television series, the interactions between Kotetsu and Barnaby are appealing, finding them comical.

In regards to Kotetsu's role in the movie, Rice Digital found the dilemma of the lead losing his powers to be well executed as it closes the series' narrative properly similar to the teleivision series. Kotaku found Kotetsu's story often done in fiction but still felt the execution was done appropriately. However, he felt the CGI employed in the movie did not fit well when Kotetsu and Barnaby are wearing their superhero suits as they work properly. Kotaku still felt the villain was not memorable Anime News Network compared the two heroes similar to lovers due to how both are unable to separate after both the television series and the films, making the plot's story repetitive to the point it was less original than the television series. Similarly, Comic Book Resources found that the movie did not make a major change in Kotetsu as his break up with Barnaby returns to its status quo in the ending as well as his relationship with Kaede, something the writers want Tiger & Bunny 2 to explore properly. The cast in general was praised Anime Herald.
