= Kotetsu T. Kaburagi =

- Tiger & Bunny character
- Kotetsu T. Kaburagi, as seen on the series' website
- First appearance: Tiger & Bunny Episode 1: "All's Well That Ends Well." (2011)
- Designed by: Masakazu Katsura
- Voiced by: Japanese; Hiroaki Hirata; English; Wally Wingert

In-universe information
- Relatives: Tomoe (wife), Kaede Kaburagi (daughter)

Kotetsu T. Kaburagi (鏑木・T・虎徹, Kaburagi T. Kotetsu), also known as Wild Tiger (ワイルドタイガー, Wairudo Taigā) is a fictional character from the anime Tiger & Bunny. One of the main protagonists and a veteran superhero past his prime whose total disregard for private property when fighting against crime earned him the nickname "Crusher for Justice". Originally, he was the least popular among the heroes of Stern Bild City and his company (a fictional publication known as "TopMag") had been taken over thanks to the high costs of his collateral damage. He was then forced by his new employers, "Apollon Media," to become Barnaby's partner. His wife Tomoe (友恵) died from a disease five years prior to the series, and his daughter Kaede lives with his mother in "Oriental Town" out in the country. Like most people outside of Hero TV, Kaede is initially unaware of her father's secret identity. Kotetsu possesses the power to increase his physical abilities hundredfold for five minutes, requiring an hour-long cooldown period before using it again.

Kotetsu is voiced by Hiroaki Hirata in Japanese and Wally Wingert in English. Critical response to Kotetsu has been positive. His heroic resolve and relationship with Barnaby were often praised by the media. He has also been featured into multiple popularity polls, taking the top place.

== Creation ==
Kotetsu T. Kaburagi was created to be an unconventional anime main character due to notable facial hair and him being far older in contrast to younger heroes. As a result, the series was created to appeal to an older audience. While Kotetsu and Barnaby bond for the series' entire run, there was an agreement to focus on a build up during the first half. Kotetsu and Barnaby's relationship is one of the main themes of the television series alongside Kotetsu's attitude of never giving up. Producer Masayuki Ozaki felt he related to Kotetsu the most within the series' all heroes due to their close age during 2011. Each of the heroes in the series is sponsored by fictional and non-fictional companies. These include large brands with Apollon Media and S.H. Figuarts promoting Kotetsu.

Kotetsu and Barnaby Brooks Jr. are respectively voiced by Hiroaki Hirata and Masakazu Morita in Japanese. According to the director Keiichi Sato, Kotetsu's image was created to make it easy for Hirata to play him. However, Hirata still faced difficulties in portraying such character. This was mostly due to his easygoing personality which contrasted with the more serious one he related more into. Their recording mics were always next to each other, and, unlike Hirata, Morita found Kotetsu as a helpful character to play along. Morita felt that Barnaby was too antisocial until the fifth episode where he felt his character was for the first time having real interactions to which Hirata said that Morita was struggling in early episodes. During the series' second half, Barnaby had developed his character which made him more pleasant to voice. Hirata felt that Barnaby was the same, claiming that his personality was that of the tsundere archetype who is awkward at displaying his emotions. Meanwhile, Kotetsu was noted to try to remain like an older man as a result of his age.

Since his first episode, Barnaby was so focused on avenging his parents, he ended up hiding inside his shell, and had never shown his true colors to anyone. Barnaby was putting an enormous pressure on himself that was pinning him down, but then, in the 13th episode, he gets closer to Kotetsu. Then 10 months pass and Nishida tried to show it as realistically as he could. The development of the main duo was originally left up to the audience's expectation until Nishida wrote the movie The Rising where there would be more pressure in regards to an official break up.

== Appearances ==
=== Tiger & Bunny ===
The city of Stern Bild is protected by a group of super-powered individuals known as the NEXT (Noted Entities with eXtraordinary Talents), who also vie for popularity on the Hero TV network. One of them is Kotetsu "Wild Tiger" Kaburagi who is considered past his prime, especially after the arrival of Barnaby "Bunny" Brooks Jr., a rookie hero who possesses the same power he has. When his sponsor company is taken over, Kotetsu is forced to work under the supervision of Alexander Lloyds, adopt a new and improved look and form a reluctant partnership with Barnaby. Despite the misrelationship Kotetsu and Barnaby share, the two form a bond as Kotetsu learns about how the Ouroboros group killed his partner's parents when he was only a child. Across the narrative, the heroes learn of Ouroboros attacking the city and Kotetsu helps Barnaby defeat the criminal Jake by tricking him into what was his superpower despite his decay in a previous battle.

Ten months after the Ouroboros incident, Kotetsu and Barnaby are a successful and popular superhero team. Kotetsu is called by Ben, who tells him the changes in his power may mean it will soon disappear. Kotetsu takes a paid vacation to visit his hometown and family. His mother Anju and older brother Muramasa soon realize that something is wrong with him and he has a hard time getting on his daughter Kaede's good side. While confessing to Muramasa that his powers are declining, Kotetsu reminisces about the promise he made to his late wife Tomoe to always be a hero, moments before she died. Having reconciled with his daughter, Kotetsu decides to resign from being a hero and focus on his family. Meanwhile, Barnaby goes into denial, saying he remembers his parents' death clearly, but some video research shows discrepancies between reality and Barnaby's memory. Upon this revelation, Barnaby's memory of the murderer's face keeps changing and he starts to doubt if he should continue being a hero, giving Kotetsu no room to tell him about his own intention to quit. Maverick decides to frame Kotetsu for Samantha's murder and overwrite the memories of everyone at Hero TV, by tampering with their wine, of Kotetsu being the NEXT known as Wild Tiger.

Kotetsu tries to make the other heroes remember he is Wild Tiger. Kaede fails to restore his memory because she was patted on the shoulder moments ago by Keith, replacing Maverick's power with his. Kotetsu takes on Barnaby's attacks, trying to get him to remember him, eventually succeeding when he calls Barnaby by his hated nickname. Reunited, the heroes take on Maverick and Kotetsu confesses to everybody how his power had been decaying. However, after a discussion with his daughter, Kotetsu remains as a hero.

=== Tiger & Bunny: The Rising ===
In the film, Schneider reveals he hired another hero, Golden Ryan, to replace him as he views Wild Tiger as past his prime. Kotetsu doesn't fight this decision as he doesn't want to hold Barnaby back from returning to the First League. Eventually, he is fired and becomes a taxi driver. Kotetsu later visits Fire Emblem, where he is lectured by Blue Rose about Barnaby still following his ideals as he is using his increased pay to give local orphans a fun time at the festival. Kaede convinces Kotetsu to continue being a hero as it is what he wants and it makes him happy. Despite his weakness, Kotetsu decides to aid Barnaby on a new mission to Agnes, now given authority on hero participation, fully reinstates Tiger and allows their partnership again, which the duo prominently display to the masses.

=== Tiger & Bunny 2 ===
Kotetsu is set to return in the 2022 anime Tiger & Bunny 2.

== Reception ==
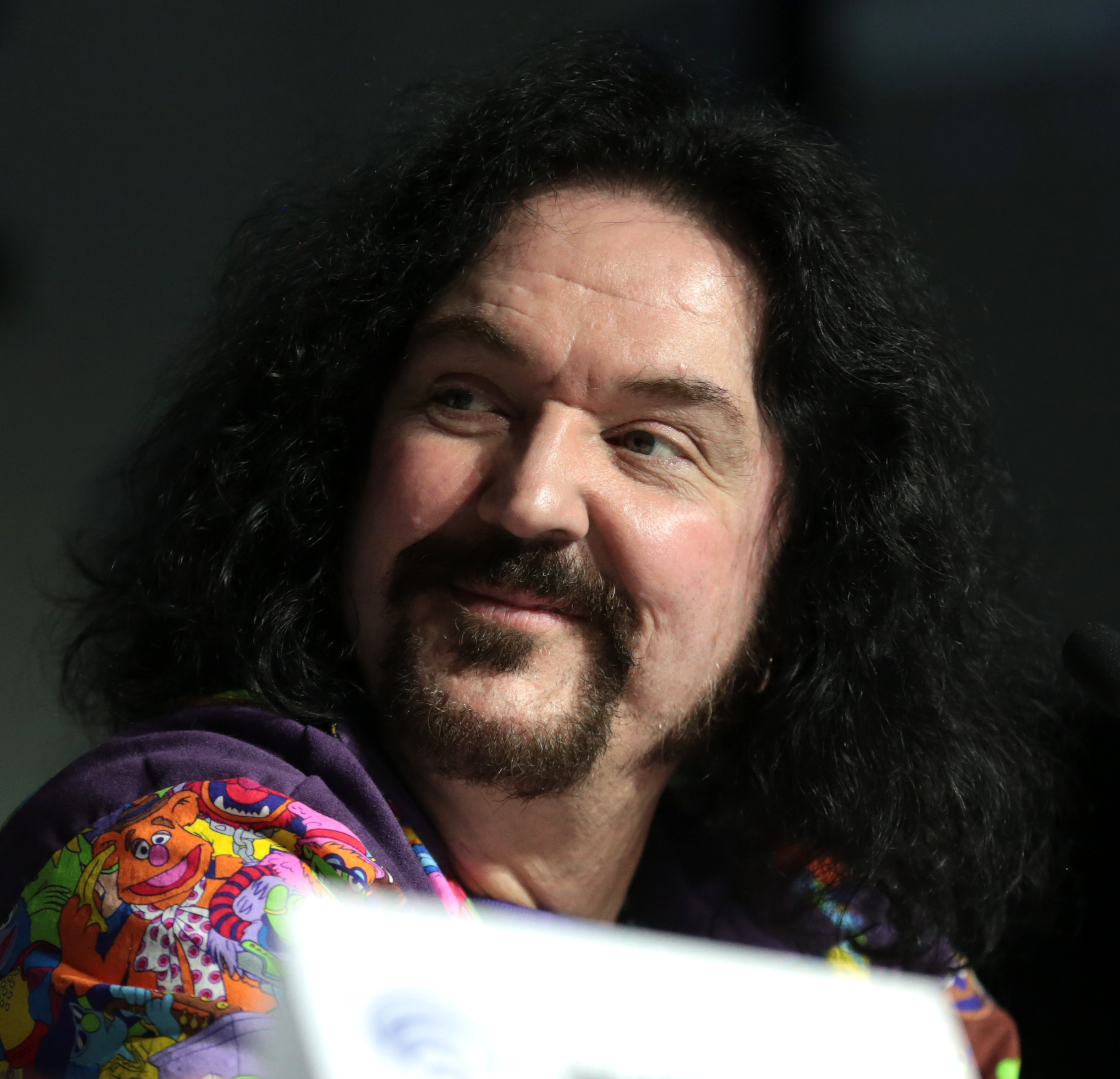
Wally Wingert's performance as Kotetsu was the subject of praise

Kotetsu has been a popular character in Japan, taking the top place in an AniGlobe poll. In a promo of a Tiger & Bunny: The Beginning poll he once again took the same spot and in a Yomerumo poll. In 2012, Hiroaki Hirata won the Best Voice Actor award in the Tokyo Anime Award Festival.

Critical response to Kotetsu's character was positive. Regarding Kotetsu, Beveridge described hims as the "conscience" of the show. Reid and Rice Digital praised Kotetsu's Japanese voice actor—Hiroaki Hirata—for giving depth to the character, and also enjoyed latter episodes showcasing Kotetsu's motivations and relationship with his family; his relationship with his daughter Kaede being described as touching. Allen Moody of THEM Anime Reviews found Kotetsu as one of the most inspirational and heroic members from the cast as a result of how he does not want to be famous but instead save people in danger, making him also a relatable lead.

Syfy's Michelle Villanueva also commended the characters' relationship, stating that the show "excels with the Buddy Cop trope" and enjoyed the Kotetsu and Barnaby growing from reluctant teammates to best friends, as well as their banter. Charles Solomon of IndieWire noted that while the concept of a "mismatched duo" is not original, it is "infinitely recycable", something which Tiger & Bunny showcases through their relationship. Beveridge also praised their relationship, finding it appropriately comedic, opinionating that both characters being adults enhances their relationship and the show, making it a "treat to watch". The handling of both characters in the manga adaptation and the first movie was praised by ComicBookBin.

In regards to Kotetsu's role in the movie, Rice Digital found the dilemma of the lead losing his powers to be well executed as it closes the series' narrative properly. IndieWire praised how despite taking place after the television series, the interactions between Kotetsu and Barnaby are appealing, finding them comical. Kotaku found Kotetsu's story often done in fiction but still felt the execution was done appropriately. However, he felt the CGI employed in the movie did not fit well when Kotetsu and Barnaby are wearing their superhero suits as they work properly. Anime News Network compared the two heroes similar to lovers due to how both are unable to separate after both the television series and the films, making the plot's story repetitive. Similarly, Comic Book Resources found that the movie did not make a major change in Kotetsu as his break up with Barnaby returns to its status quo in the ending as well as his relationship with Kaede, something the writers want Tiger & Bunny 2 to explore properly. Wally Wingert's performance as Kotetsu's English voice was praised by Anime Herald.

Anime News Network found Kotetsu to an ideal hero due to how he disregards norms of the requirements needed in his world such as being paid, being well received by the media or being thanked by the people he saves. This is subject of discussion in the series whenever Kotetsu and Barnaby have clashes of ideals. This makes him stand out in the world of Tiger and Bunny as the main character, giving also an air of realism.
