= Karas (TV series) =

2005 anime

- Box cover art of Karas — The Complete Collection

鴉 －KARAS－ (Karasu)
- Genre: Cyberpunk; Dark fantasy; Superhero
- Created by: Tatsunoko Production Planning Office
- Original video animation
- Directed by: Keiichi Sato
- Produced by: Toshio Iizuka; Tsuyoshi Yoshida (#1–3); Shigehiro Tanaka (#1–3); Yasuhiro Mikami (#4–6)
- Written by: Shin Yoshida
- Music by: Yoshihiro Ike
- Studio: Tatsunoko VCR
- Licensed by: AUS: Madman Entertainment; NA: Manga Entertainment; UK: Manga Entertainment
- Released: March 25, 2005 – August 3, 2007
- Runtime: 30 minutes
- Episodes: 6

Karas (Japanese: 鴉－KARAS－, Hepburn: Karasu; lit. The Crow) is a Japanese six-part original video animation series produced by Tatsunoko Production to commemorate the studio's 40th anniversary. Each Karas episode was first televised in Japan as a pay-per-view program from March 25, 2005, to August 3, 2007, before being released onto DVDs. Manga Entertainment compiled and released these episodes as two feature length, direct-to-DVD films for the English market.

Karas tells the story of Yousuke Otoha, a former yakuza, living in a fictional version of Shinjuku, Tokyo populated by humans and yōkai (Japanese spirits). He is one of the titular karas, humans appointed as superpowered agents of the land. Able to transform into a car, an aircraft, and an armored crusader; the skilled swordsman is to stop his corrupt predecessor, Eko, from taking over Tokyo. Supporting characters such as Eko's former henchman, Nue; the yōkai; and Homura, the karas of another city, help Otoha in his quest. A concurrent side story focuses on humans affected by Eko's scheme.

Karas won the Best Original Video at the 2006 Tokyo Anime Award competition, and most reviewers were impressed with the images produced by fusing 2D and 3D art techniques. The story presents themes on the conflicts between cultural traditions and modern society, and the relationship between people. Reviewers, however, found its presentation was too confusing to follow; several of them felt it worsened the show by detracting from the strength of its art.

== Plot ==
Ibira initially pictured Karas as a horror story with a vengeance theme. It had a simple plot similar to the manga, Dororo. The protagonist karas is on a quest, slaughtering mikuras to recover the body parts of his murdered lover. Until he recovers all the parts, he assembles them into a katana to kill the mikuras. The final version of Karas was more of a superhero action story, and originally intended for three leading heroes in the same vein as the Japanese period drama, Sanbiki ga Kiru!. The characters Otoha, Nue, and the human detective Kure were the leads but the final version primarily focused on Otoha. The presentation of Karas differs in several ways from typical anime. The show maintains a serious tone and never indulges in slapstick, exaggerated facial expressions, or super deformed characters. It avoids heavy expositions. Dialogue tends to be short and viewers have to infer what is going on based on very little presented information. The team had left out substantial amounts of information from the show, printing them in a booklet of the final DVD package.

=== Setting ===
Karas is set in a fictional version of Shinjuku, Tokyo. The show initially showcased larger areas of Tokyo, but the production team felt other animations have featured these areas too many times. Art designer Hajime Satō created a modern version of the ward infused with a mixture of East Asian cultures. Fictional lettering, resembling Chinese and Hangul characters, fill the billboards and signs. Western gargoyles and Singapore's Merlion statues decorate the streets, and the buildings are modeled on Shinjuku structures of 2003 while blending influences from the Shōwa period. This Shinjuku is populated by humans and Japanese folklore spirits, yōkai. The humans have become indifferent to the yōkai's presence, and fail to see them as they go about their lives.

The production team envisioned Japanese cities as entities, who require physical agents to execute their will and regulate the activities within them. The concept behind the health of a city is based on traditional Chinese medicine in which the smooth flow of a body's fluids nourishes its internal organs. The team equates yōkai with qi, humans with water, and agents of the city (karas) with blood. They integrated Celtic mythology into their concept for further symbolisms, treating the city as the male (yang); and Yurine (ゆりね), the manifestation of its will as female (yin). In contrast, their theory treats the humans and agents as the children of the city and its will, and classifies them as the reproduction system's five major organs. Following the team's vision, the mikuras (evil yōkai) represent the five elements in this system. This idea forms the basis of the relationship between cities and their inhabitants in the show.

=== Story ===
The main plot centers around the confrontation between Otoha and Eko. After a cold open that announces Eko's plan to remake Tokyo, the story moves ahead three years. Nue arrives in Shinjuku to free his brother from Eko's hold, while Otoha is in a hospital from heavy injuries. The early parts of the show proceed in a "mikura of the week" fashion as Otoha (as a karas) and Nue separately fight against Eko's minions. When the mikuras attack hospitals across the ward to locate Otoha's body, Otoha and Nue work together but when they separate Otoha's Yurine is abducted and he is deprived from the power to turn into a karas. Nue then goes to Eko's base, where Eko kills Yurine and reveals capturing Nue completes the final part of his plan. Meanwhile, Otoha gets into a yakuza fight only to be rescued by Homura, another city's karas. When Eko launches the last stage of his plan and ravages Tokyo with metal tentacles, Otoha ends up among human refugees in a shelter the chief of police had commissioned.

A side story takes place within the main plot, focusing on the humans affected by the ongoing events. Sagisaka Minoru and Narumi Kure are detectives in Shinjuku's Intervention Department who investigate serial murders for supernatural evidence. Mikuras kill and suck the blood of these victims to replenish their strength, but no one except Sagisaka seriously believes in supernatural involvement. Sagisaka is bent on vindicating his daughter, Yoshiko who has been committed to a psychiatric hospital for claiming a mikura committed the mass murder she had survived. Sagisaka's and Kure's investigation brings them to the survivor of another attack, Hinaru (ヒナル). Director Sato had created her to represent the best qualities of rural migrants looking for better opportunities in the big cities. When Eko starts the last part of his plan; Kure, Hinaru, and the Sagisaka arrive in the shelter Otoha is in.

The chief of police reveals himself as Ushi-oni and starts eating the humans trapped in the shelter. Sagisaka sacrifices himself to push his daughter away from Ushi-oni's attack. Otoha confronts and, in a climatic sequence, his conviction resurrects his Yurine, which restores Otoha as a karas and he slays Ushi-oni. While karas from other cities observe the showdown between Otoha and Eko, Homura steps in to help Otoha. Otoha carries out Nue's request to kill him and his brother, depriving Eko of his new power source and stopping his entire scheme. Confronting the depowered Eko on equal terms, Otoha finally defeats him. Eko claims Otoha will understand his reasons after 400 years as a karas. Despite defending his human body and Yurine from soldiers ordered by the Deputy Governor to shoot them, Otoha proclaims himself as Tokyo's appointed agent, who will protect all its inhabitants. While Hinaru stays behind in Shinjuku as it is being rebuilt, Kure and Yoshiko have had enough and leave for the countryside.

In a post-credits scene, Eko's boot is found by an unknown character.

=== Characters ===
[Just as New York City has Spider-Man, and Gotham City has Batman], it's about time for Japan to have its own local hero. (Note: Original text: 志田伸：「紐約有蜘蛛人，高登市則有蝙蝠俠，像這樣在美國的特定市中都有本土的英雄存在，但是日本卻幾乎沒有，於是監督說：「既然這樣，差不多也該在日本出現一個本土英雄吧。」」)

— Keiichi Sato, director

The production team intended Karas to be more than a mere henshin (transforming) hero. Unlike the vengeful protagonist in Mazinger Z, the hero of Karas embodies the spirit of the city, and acts for the city's interest instead of his own. Screenwriter Shin Yoshida sets up a dualism of this idea in the form of two Karas characters; one who believes events are leading to a revolution, and the other viewing them as simply the passing of an era. Manga Entertainment also promoted the hero in Karas as "a cross between a cyberpunk version of the Crow and Batman".

Karas is the title for the city's appointed agents. Capable of transforming into automobiles and aircraft, they are suits of armor animated by human souls infused into them through Yurine's chanting of a Shinto prayer. Director Sato told his animators to enhance the Karas' dark nature by drawing their faces in shadows. Fight scenes involving Karas take place mostly in dark settings shrouded with steam or lit with spotlights. Animators touched up film frames by hand, creating an effect different from cel-shaded animation. To make the Karas more menacing, they highlighted the eyes as if light bulbs were shining through them, a technique inspired by the suitmation practice of using light bulbs for the eyes of costumes. Producer Takaya Ibira explained the presence of ravens in Tokyo and the Tower of London, inspired him and Sato to model the agents of the city after them. He stated ravens are believed to be omens of good and bad in superstitions, and they always seem to be watching over the cities. This resonated with his view of the raven in the story Noah's Ark, which cursed Noah as it scouted for land. The presence of ravens all over Tokyo led Ibira to notice the same of cats and conceive the Yurines as catgirls.

Otoha Yosuke (乙羽 陽介, Otoha Yosuke) is the protagonist of Karas. Yoshida wrote out Otoha Yosuke as a character dark in history and actions, breaking the traditional mold of a Japanese hero. He based his idea on his observation of Shinjuku, questioning what sort of a hero a ward exuding an aura of terror and happiness would produce. He portrayed Otoha as the product of incest between his mother and his brother who is the local yakuza boss. Otoha's back-story states him as suffering from congenital insensitivity to pain which lends the character a merciless reputation as his brother's enforcer. The initial concept of Otoha was much darker, casting him as a serial killer who hunts down mikuras to retrieve his lover's body parts. This was the first project that Sohkoh Wada (和田 聰宏, Wada Sōkō) worked on.

The main antagonist to Otoha is Eko Hoshunin (鳳春院 廻向, Hōshun'in Ekō). His back-story states he was the Karas of Tokyo since the Edo period. In events before the start of the show, Eko turned his back on his duties and started a plan to revitalize the city and its yōkai. He attracted several yōkai to be his cybernetic followers and intended to subjugate the humans. An Oedipus complex forms the basis for his motive. He views Tokyo as a father figure, and his Yurine as a mother figure; and aims to supplant the city's role in this relationship. Eko was a nameless character in the initial draft and known as "Another Karas" with a different appearance, although his prosthetic left leg is retained for the final version.

Mikura (御座) are yōkai who became Eko's minions and replaced their bodies with machinery. Ibira and Sato chose them to be villains, linking the act of the Karas as agents of the city killing these folklore creatures to traditional Japanese exorcism. The chimera-like Nue, however, is a tragic anti-hero who learned of Eko's plans and turned against him. Sato thought up the cybernetic angle to surprise the Japanese who perceive immaterial yōkai to lack physical threat. Creature designer Kenji Andō adapted the yōkai designs from artist Toriyama Sekien's illustrated folklore books, Gazu Hyakki Yakō. The few yōkai with prominent roles in the show underwent greater changes. Andō pictured mikuras as direct cybernetic versions of Toriyama's portrayals, and made Suiko the Kappa and Nue look like robotic versions of their illustrated forms. Sato, however, was dissatisfied with two of Andō's designs, and redesigned them based on the concept behind the yōkai instead of on their appearance. The ghostly head in a flaming wheel, Wanyūdō became a heavily armed skull-on-wheels; and the bull-headed spider, Ushi-oni became a big-mouth, bug-eye, hungry-for-humans predator.

== Themes ==
The show explores the relationship between technology and cultural traditions by personifying traditions as yōkai and mikuras. Ibira thought this up from observing a dramatic drop in the number of yōkai folk tales as Japan undergoes modernization. Electrical and gas lighting made light of these tales born from fear of darkness. The production team explained yōkai represent the city's culture and functions, and their strengths are inversely proportional to the level of technology of society. As society grows more advanced, the yōkai and the functions of the city they represent weaken. The mikuras symbolize the five elements of Taoism. They turned to technology and became cyborgs to regain the strength to support the city. When a mikura dies, the city suffers a heavy loss of function associated with the element it represents; the water level of Tokyo fell after the death of Suiko the kappa (water-based mikura). This theme implies a vibrant city requires a healthy mix of technology and culture.

Humans do not see yōkai just because they believe in them. Rather it is when yōkai trust humans and show themselves that their existence is believed in. This relationship is not just between humans and yōkai, but should be between humans as well.

— Karas committee, Tatsunoko Production

Another main theme is regarding the "yōkai's choice". As agents of the city, the two karas represent different paths for the good of the city. The yōkai have to make a choice to support one of them. By following Eko, the humans are enslaved, and the presence of the yōkai will be imposed on them. By standing behind Otoha, the yōkai accept their lot and continue trying to live with the humans. Using the yōkai-human relationship as an analogy for human-human interaction, the team suggested people should be open and make the move, instead of passively staying in the background hoping for results. Ibira applied this to decision making, saying when faced with difficult choices, one should make a decision instead of hoping for others to make it for them.

== Production ==
Director Sato envisioned a dark hero when he presented these concept art to Tatsunoko Production.

Founded in 1962, Tatsunoko Production celebrated their 40th year of animated film production by releasing Karas in 2005, their first production being Space Ace in 1965. Keiichi Sato joined the company as the project director after he pitched its concept of a life-sized dark hero to the management. He researched production and direction techniques from kabuki, a form of traditional Japanese theater; and Japanese staged sword fights as materials for the project. Choreographed sword fights rendered with 3D animation were rare at that time, and Sato felt this would help distinguish the show. The use of theatrical elements and movie shooting techniques in its presentation sets Karas apart from its contemporaries. Producer Kenji Nakamura felt the team's lack of experience in this area pushed them to ignore their previous animation work experience and break free of restrictions influenced by traditional animation production.

The Japanese animation industry traditionally drew every film cel by hand. This is labor-intensive and inefficient; the cels are generally non-reusable, and errors are difficult to correct. This method is called the 2D approach due to the conception of the source images in only two dimensions. The use of computers and graphics software introduced computer graphics (CG) into the industry. This reduced waste; animators can reuse digital cels to correct errors and make changes. Increasing computer power spread the use of three-dimensional graphics software to create 3D models and environments, and render them as 2D images. This 3D approach requires more resources to create the 3D models, but production teams can correct errors or remake film sequences much faster than the traditional 2D approach. The 2D-3D hybrid approach in Karas was due to budget and aesthetic concerns. The 2D approach allowed greater artistic details and creativity, and the 3D approach could save resources. Sato, however, disapproved the common notion of using the 3D approach for economic concern. He pushed the team to enhance image quality with detailed CG. He was also dissatisfied with computer lighting effects, and ordered the animators to draw them by hand. Due to the bright colors of the original cels, they darkened the images and concentrated on areas where shadows should be, leaving untouched the areas where light falls on.

In the typical CG approach, the duties of 2D and 3D artists are distinct. The 2D artists think up and sketch out the characters' appearances; the 3D artists create the models based on these concept sketches. For Karas, these artists worked together in these areas to create the imagery seen in the show. To encourage this and establish consistency between images based on 2D and 3D processes, the 2D drawings incorporate styles typically found in 3D models. Animators also touched up or enhanced by hand, sequences involving the models. Eko's karas form was mainly a 3D model but his skirt was hand drawn. During later stages of editing, the team spaced hand drawn frames among 3D-rendered frames to enhance the fusion of styles. The production did not use motion capture techniques. Animators drew out action scenes based on their feelings, inspirations, and observations. 3D and 2D animation and special effects director, Takashi Hashimoto explained companies typically reduce their animators' workload by using CG for long shots and drawing only close-ups by hand. The team working on Karas, however, drew silhouettes for long shots and created complicated CG for close-ups. The 3D animators used 3D texture software, BodyPaint 3D, to refine textures for the mikura and karas models, creating seamless details on them.

CG director, Takayuki Chiba studied keren, a kabuki stagecraft technique using various props to surprise audiences and immerse them in the show. Chiba attempted to apply this technique with CG to reproduce a vividness associated with live actor productions. He aimed to produce a smooth 2D-3D product full of Japanese flavor, rather than something like a "Disney production". The team scanned real objects and used them in the show. Rice seasoning powder and bird feed became the dust and rubble in scenes of collapsing structures. They also scanned Korean dried seaweed, gim for other scenes. The animation team drew frames interpolating the motion between key frames by hand, and digitally interpolated those frames to create slow motion sequences. Editing teams in the industry normally time stretch the sequence with repeated still frames to produce these shots. Ibira reflected that typical 30-minute anime episodes consist of approximately 300 key frames. The first episode of Karas, however, consisted of approximately 700 key frames.

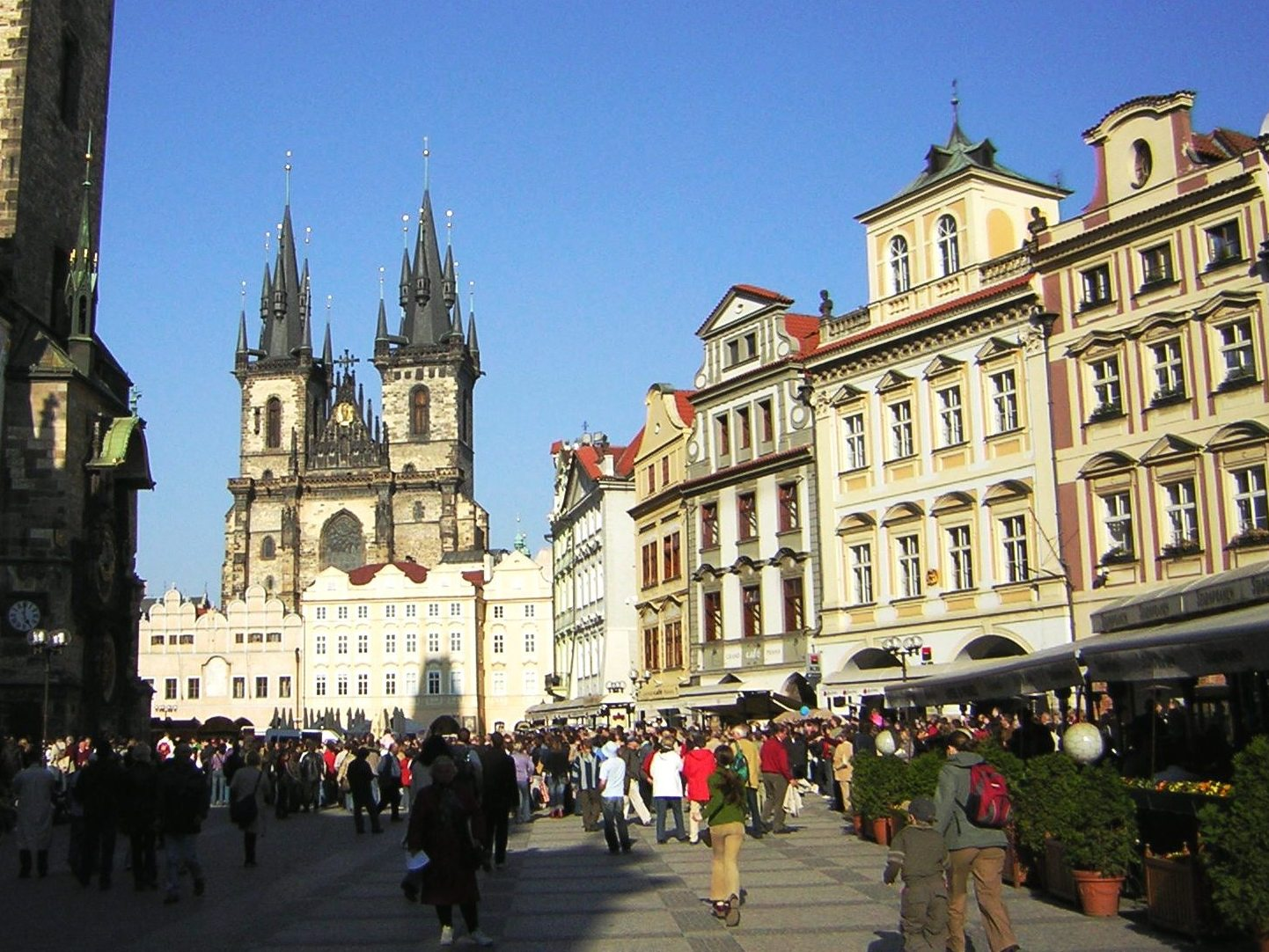
Composer Yoshihiro Ike was influenced by the atmosphere of Prague in choosing its symphony orchestra.

Composer Yoshihiro Ike infused the music with the sorrow borne by the karas, and the atmosphere conveyed by the background. Ike obliged the team's request for Japanese flavored music, and studied kabuki tunes accompanying actors as they strike their mie (見得), a picturesque pose to establish their character. He planned to use taikos (Japanese drums) to further enhance the music, but felt the show had taken on an international outlook and discarded the notion. He wanted his music to match the quality of the show, and refrained from composing them until he had watched the pre-dubbed version of the first episode. He composed most of his music as he watched the pre-dubbed episodes to synchronize their tempo and dynamics with the action in the show. He chose Prague Symphony Orchestra to perform the main theme because he felt the background of their city and its people suited the character of Karas. Other departments also took extraordinary measures in producing the show. The sound crew procured a Nissan Skyline GT-R and recorded its engine noise for several runs. These were used for the tunnel chase scenes which involved a hand-drawn 1972–77 Skyline. The editing team took the additional step of editing cels post-voice recording to ensure lip movements were in synch with the voices. These extra work and the hybrid 2D-3D approach inflated the budget of the production to three times the usual amount spent on an original video animation.

== Media information ==
No.	Episode title		First airing
No.	English	Japanese	First airing
1	Overture	The Karas Awakens (鴉開眼, Karasu Kaigan)	2005-03-25
2	Inferno	The Flaming Wheels (火炎輪, Kaenwa)	2005-08-12
3	Revive	The Destruction Awakes (滅 覚醒, Metsu Kakusei)	2005-10-21
4	Sacrifice	The Human Otoha (人 乙羽, Hito Otoha)	2007-06-22
5	Engage	The Illusion of a District (幻想区, Gensōku)	2007-08-03
6	Existence	The True Legend (真 伝説, Shin Densetsu)	2007-08-03

The Japanese episodes initially broadcast one after the other over the dedicated anime pay-per-view channel, Perfect Choice 160, from March 25, 2005, to August 3, 2007. Tatsunoko and the East Asian licensors (providing Chinese subtitles) released Karas as six single-DVD packages in their regions. The collectors' editions feature a hardcover book showing the storyboard for the episode.

Manga Entertainment released the English DVD edition of Karas as two eighty-five-minute feature length films, The Prophecy and The Revelation, on April 24, 2006, and October 22, 2007, respectively. Each feature consists of three original episodes joined together, and has an additional English voice track. They have also released Karas: The Prophecy on UMD. Columbia Music Entertainment published Ike's music for the show on October 24, 2007, as a 24-track audio CD. Dark Horse Comics produced a one-shot comic which went on sale, and is given free with collectors' editions and The Prophecy. The story written by Phil Amara, author of the comic Sky Ape, is an adaptation of the story in episode one.

== Reception ==
Many reviewers praised the presentation of the fights in Karas.

Karas impressed its reviewers with its animated imagery. Mania Entertainment affirmed its lush imagery was enough to hook viewers, and certain 2D-3D scenes matched photorealistic standards. They felt Karas could rival or beat live-action films in the visual department. DVD Talk commented they saw evidence a lot of effort went into merging the 2D and 3D animations. They, however, felt setting the scenes in darkness and obscuring points of interest with smoke or other effects marred the high quality imagery. Anime News Network stated the richly detailed images; fast moving action scenes; and visual effects of collapsing buildings, explosions, and blood made Karas one of the best action animation. Reviewers praised the fight scenes between the CG generated karas and mikuras, declaring them realistic, tasteful and stunning. DVD Talk, however, complained the camera jerked and moved all over the place never showing fights cleanly. Mania stated the fights in the later half failed to match those in the first half in terms of beauty, intensity, and variety; the overlaying of characters' face onto their armored forms in the finale detracted from their viewing experience.

Ike's music for Karas impressed reviewers. Anime News Network stated his long scores set the mood in the scenes with their tone, enhancing the reviewers' watching experience. Prague Symphony Orchestra's performance of the main theme impressed more reviewers who claimed it brought out the heroic essence of Karas with a sense of power and drama, and enhanced the impact of the quick and intense battles.

Karas, however, suffered the worst criticisms for its story. Many reviewers and even the voice actors could not follow its dialogue and presentation. Other reviewers felt the abstract presentation forced viewers who wanted to understand the story, to pay extreme attention to the scant details presented in the show. Reelfilm and DVD Verdict were more critical, stating the viewer should not have to resort to reading summaries on the packaging to make sense of a story populated with incoherent battles and characters hard to tell apart from.

The viewers' confused reaction to their story based on the first half, disappointed and frustrated Sato and Ibira. Sato explained the first two episodes were to capture the viewers' attention, and remaining episodes would reveal greater details of the story. Mania complained this franchising tactic is a poor excuse for initial episodes lacking substance. They said although the later half answered much of the questions raised in the first, it created unanswered questions of its own. IGN and DVD Talk felt the story was darker and flowed better in the later half than the first, but IGN felt the revelation of details came too late in the show. DVD Verdict felt the story was pointless. Despite the protagonist reaffirming himself as a protector of the city, his showdown with the antagonist reduced most of Shinjuku to ruins. Reviewers found if they stripped the plot to its basics, it is a shallow good-versus-evil story made complex by its presentation in the first half. They, however, appreciated the surprising deaths of certain characters whose sacrifice in vain rendered a poignant emotion at that point of story.

Reviewers felt part of the failings laid with the underdeveloped characters despite them being slightly different from usual anime stock characters. The story neither properly introduces them nor explains their backgrounds and motivations, making them hard to identify with. Eko's menace only came by force and not by his personality or schemes, making him a weak villain. DVD Talk found it hard to piece together the relationship between the main characters, but acknowledged the later half addressed some of these issues by revealing the background of some characters. They felt the revelations fleshed out Otoha's personality and motivation, helping viewers to sympathize and identify with the protagonist.

Overall, reviewers are mixed in their final assessment of Karas. Their common reaction is of a visually stunning show with a confusing story. DVD Talk commented the blending of traditional 2D drawings and 3D CG was interesting; but with a lacking story, the product is a "triumph of style over substance". In spite of the criticisms, Karas won Best Original Video at the 2006 Tokyo Anime Award competition, and was one of United States' top 10 best selling anime titles in 2006.
