= Manaria Friends =

Japanese anime television series

- Old promotional art for the series, featuring Grea (left) and Anne (right)

マナリアフレンズ (Manaria Furenzu)
- Genre: Fantasy; Slice of life
- Created by: Cygames
- Manga

Rage of Bahamut: Manaria Friends
- Illustrated by: Kenji Mizuda
- Published by: Cygames
- Imprint: Cycomics
- Magazine: Cycomi
- Original run: 8 May 2016 – 26 November 2017
- Volumes: 2
- Anime television series

Mysteria Friends
- Directed by: Hideki Okamoto
- Produced by: Tatsushi Moriya; Kaneiwa Makoto
- Written by: Satoko Sekine
- Music by: Takashi Watanabe
- Studio: CygamesPictures
- Licensed by: NA: Sentai Filmworks; UK: MVM Films
- Original network: Tokyo MX, BS11, AT-X, J:COM TV
- English network: SEA: Animax Asia
- Original run: 20 January 2019 – 24 March 2019
- Episodes: 10

Manaria Friends (Japanese: マナリアフレンズ, Hepburn: Manaria Furenzu), formerly Rage of Bahamut: Manaria Friends (神撃のバハムート マナリアフレンズ, Shingeki no Bahamūto Manaria Furenzu), is a Japanese anime television series based on the Rage of Bahamut social game. It was originally scheduled to premiere in April 2016, before being postponed and rescheduled to January 2019. The anime series is licensed worldwide excluding Asia by Sentai Filmworks.

== Characters ==
Anne (アン, An)
Voiced by: Yoko Hikasa (Japanese); Cat Thomas (English)
Princess of Mysteria and student at the Mysteria Academy of Magic. This magical prodigy has been able to command guardian spirits from an early age. Cheerful and always trying to do the right thing, she draws others to her with charisma inherited from her father, the king. All the same, she can be scatterbrained from time to time. She cares deeply about her friend Grea.
Grea (グレア, Gurea)
Voiced by: Ayaka Fukuhara (Japanese); Avery Smithhart (English)
A half-human, half-dragon girl who was a misfit in the home of the dragons. Grea enrolled in the Mysteria Academy of Magic to try out life with humans. She was initially self-conscious about her looks, but her friendship with Anne is helping her grow more confident. Though this is never made entirely explicit, Grea seems to have romantic feelings for Anne, who is her real friend at Mysteria.
Hanna (ハンナ, Han'na)
Voiced by: Nana Mizuki (Japanese); Juliet Simmons (English)
The class president at the Mysteria Academy of Magic. Her love of the school and sense of responsibility are second to none, making her a favorite of the other students. She is as proud as she is capable but doesn't always have the confidence to say what she's really feeling.
Owen (オーウェン, Ōwen)
Voiced by: Wataru Hatano (Japanese); Adam Gibbs (English)
A royal sentry who's come to the academy serving as Anne's bodyguard. He can be a bit stiff or overly formal at times, but his concern for Anne is as real as it comes. Studying at the academy.
Lou (ルゥ, Rū)
Voiced by: Kimiko Koyama (Japanese); Hilary Haag (English)
A spacey and ditzy but loveable freshman. She becomes best friends with an observer, an eyeball-shaped monster that fell from the sky. Although she's still got a long way to go when it comes to learning magic, she's enjoying academy life.
Miranda (ミランダ)
Voiced by: Kikuko Inoue (Japanese); Heidi Hinkel (English)
A teacher of holy magic at the Mysteria Academy of Magic. Though her way of speaking tends to be risqué on occasion, she's essentially always thinking of what's best for the students. Her hobby is clothesmaking, and her office is filled with questionably appropriate outfits. Can act a bit reckless at times.
William (ウィリアム, Wiriamu)
Voiced by: Yuma Uchida (Japanese); Adam Noble (English)
A straight-A student who serves as a library assistant in the Mysteria Academy of Magic. When the pressure's on, he sometimes starts speaking in the dialect of his homeland. He has unrequited romantic feelings for class president Hanna.
Heinlein (ハインライン, Hainrain)
Voiced by: Chiharu Sawashiro (Japanese); Jay Hickman (English)
A teacher of shadow magic at the Mysteria Academy of Magic. His proficiency with shadow magic helps him respond to any challenge with equanimity.
Poppy (ポピー, Popī)
Voiced by: Lynn (Japanese); Shelby Blocker (English)
A student at the Mysteria Academy of Magic. Knowledgeable, calm, and composed, she serves as secretary for the class president Hanna.

== Production ==
Originally titled Rage of Bahamut: Manaria Friends, the series is an adaptation of the "Mysteria Academy" or "Manaria Mahō Gakuin" event in the Rage of Bahamut social game, and is unrelated to the earlier Rage of Bahamut anime, which was also adapted from the game. Cygames announced the adaptation in August 2015. The series was originally announced as being written and directed by Takafumi Hoshikawa, with animation by Studio Hibari. Megumi Ishihara was to provide the series' character designs and serve as chief animation director. Kenichi Kurata was the art director for the anime, and the music was to be composed by Takashi Watanabe. However, on 8 March 2016, all of the series' staff was removed "due to various circumstances." On 2 October 2018, it was announced that the series would be released as Manaria Friends, with CygamesPictures stepping in to animate the series. Additionally, Hideki Okamoto directed, Satoko Sekine wrote the scripts, Minami Yoshida provided character designs, and Takashi Watanabe composed the series' music.

== Broadcast and release ==
The series was scheduled to air as part of the Ultra Super Anime Time program of anime shorts from Ultra Super Pictures, alongside Space Patrol Luluco and the second season of Kagewani. It was to have premiered on 1 April 2016, and been broadcast on Tokyo MX, BS11, and AT-X. However, on 8 March 2016, it was announced that the series' broadcast had been delayed until further notice, and its slot in Ultra Super Anime Time block was filled by a rebroadcast of the 2014 series Puchim@s!! Petit Petit Idolm@ster, a spinoff of The Idolm@ster franchise. After the staff was replaced, it was rescheduled to premiere from 20 January 2019 to 24 March 2019.

Sentai Filmworks announced that they had acquired worldwide rights, excluding Asia, to the anime series. It was released under the title Mysteria Friends. The series ran for 10 episodes. On April 21, 2019, Sentai Filmworks released an English dub on HIDIVE.

No.	Title (Note: All English titles are taken from Crunchyroll.)	Original release date
1	"Anne and Grea"; Transliteration: "An to Gurea" (Japanese: アンとグレア)	20 January 2019
Anne and Grea are chitchatting during school breakfast, when an incident in the library forces Anne to leave her and try to fix it.
2	"The Anguished Dragon Princess"; Transliteration: "Tatsuki modaeru" (Japanese: 竜姫悶える)	27 January 2019
Grea is suddenly struck with a high fever and Anne goes through the "forbidden" archives of the library trying to find a way to cure her.
3	"The Princess' Day Off"; Transliteration: "Hime-sama no Kyūjitsu" (Japanese: 姫様の休日)	3 February 2019
Anne and Grea spend the day shopping in town.
4	"Exam Period"; Transliteration: "Shiken kikan" (Japanese: 試験期間)	10 February 2019
It is exam time at the school, and with everyone studying, Anne does not get to spend a lot of time with Grea.
5	"The Academy Surrenders"; Transliteration: "Gakuin kanraku" (Japanese: 学院陥落)	17 February 2019
Monsters suddenly attack the school from within, and Anne sneaks in to find and rescue Grea.
6	"Floating at Sea"; Transliteration: "Umi ni uku" (Japanese: 海に浮く)	24 February 2019
While the rest of the class is having fun at the beach, Anne and Grea go on their own private adventure.
7	"Hide and Seek"; Transliteration: "Kakurenbo" (Japanese: かくれんぼ)	3 March 2019
Anne and Grea are on library duty and, in order to pass the time, they decide to play a game of hide-and-seek.
8	"Backstage"; Transliteration: "Matsuri En no Ura" (Japanese: 祭演の裏)	10 March 2019
The school play is about to begin when Grea starts to have stage fright and it is up to Anne to calm her down.
9	"One Day…"; Transliteration: "Aruhi…" (Japanese: 或る日…)	17 March 2019
It is winter season and Anne is sad and not on speaking terms with Grea, which may have dire consequences not just for the two of them, but also for the entire world.
10	"Their Promise"; Transliteration: "Futari no chikai" (Japanese: ふたりの誓い)	24 March 2019
Summer break is about to start, and with almost everyone leaving the school for the holidays, Grea realizes that Anne and her will soon be graduating and that they have very little time left together.

== Reception ==
The series was highly appreciated by Western critics, both because of the high quality of the animation and the attractively depicted relationship between the main characters with a large number of homoerotism and lesbian subtext, which allowed Theron Martin from Anime News Network to relate this show to the best examples of the "slice of life yuri" works. Although he agreed that overly measured telling a story might seem boring and thereby repel many viewers, Theron recommended this series to those who like to enjoy the slice of life anime or are looking for a show with a lot of yuri potential.
