= Barnaby Brooks Jr. =

- Tiger & Bunny character
- Barnaby Brooks Jr., as seen on the series' website
- First appearance: Tiger & Bunny Episode 1: "All's Well That Ends Well." (2011)
- Designed by: Masakazu Katsura
- Voiced by: Japanese; Masakazu Morita; English; Yuri Lowenthal

Barnaby Brooks Jr. (バーナビー・ブルックスJr., Bānabī Burukkusu Junia), also known as Bunny (バニー, Banī), is a fictional character from the anime Tiger & Bunny. He is voiced by Masakazu Morita in Japanese and Yuri Lowenthal in English.

He was conceived as a foil to the other series lead, Kotetsu T. Kaburagi (Wild Tiger), and the development of their relationship is a major focus across the series.

== Description ==
Barnaby Brooks Jr. is a 25-year-old "Super Rookie" at Hero TV. He is nicknamed "Bunny" by Kotetsu for his armor's long earpieces and his energetic fighting style. His powered suit displays advertising for Amazon.co.jp as well as Bandai and its "Crusade System" card series. He is also equipped with a motorcycle called the Lonely Chaser that can use Tiger's bike as a sidecar, a combination known as "Double Chaser".

The two share the same power and partner together despite their conflicting personalities and opinions on appropriate superhero behavior. Barnaby is the antisocial tsundere to Kotetsu's more outgoing and amiable personality. Barnaby relies more on strategy than outright brute force, and saves his Hundred Power for the most dire of circumstances.

== Appearances ==
=== Tiger and Bunny ===
Barnaby's parents (robotics engineers and the inventors of "nano-metal") were assassinated when he was four. Barnaby was taken in by Albert Maverick and dedicated his life to investigating the crime syndicate, Ouroboros, one of whose members, Jake Martinez, was originally thought to be the assassin. The trauma of seeing his parents murdered hardened Barnaby's heart and he was consumed with thoughts of revenge (he took his and his father's real name as his hero name in what he says is a declaration of war against Ouroboros). He could not trust anyone until he began his partnership with Kotetsu.

After defeating Jake and learning to trust Kotetsu, Barnaby adopts a positive outlook on life and becomes more open and willing to work with others. He starts addressing Kotetsu by name instead of as "Old Man", and accepts "Bunny" as his nickname. The nickname is important in a brainwashing plotline in which Albert Maverick is defeated. After that, Barnaby retires from heroics, thinking his entire career was for nothing. When Kotetsu returns as "Wild Tiger 1 Minute" a year later, Barnaby decides to return in order to assist his partner.

Barnaby's successful partnership with Kotetsu leads him to first position in Hero TV's rankings, earning him the "King of Heroes" title in his debut season. Barnaby eventually surpasses Mr. Legend's points-per-season record, and dreams of the "Hero World" envisioned by his surrogate father, Albert Maverick, where all "NEXT" (an acronym standing for Noted Entities with eXtraordinary Talents) are accepted and heroes protect the innocent.

=== Tiger & Bunny: The Rising ===
In Tiger & Bunny: The Rising, Barnaby has a new partner, Golden Ryan, as Wild Tiger is viewed as being past his prime. Kotetsu does not fight the decision, as he does not want to hold Barnaby back from returning to the First League. On their first mission together, Ryan & Barnaby successfully keep a toppling tower from falling. Tiger and Bunny are eventually reunited.

== Reception ==
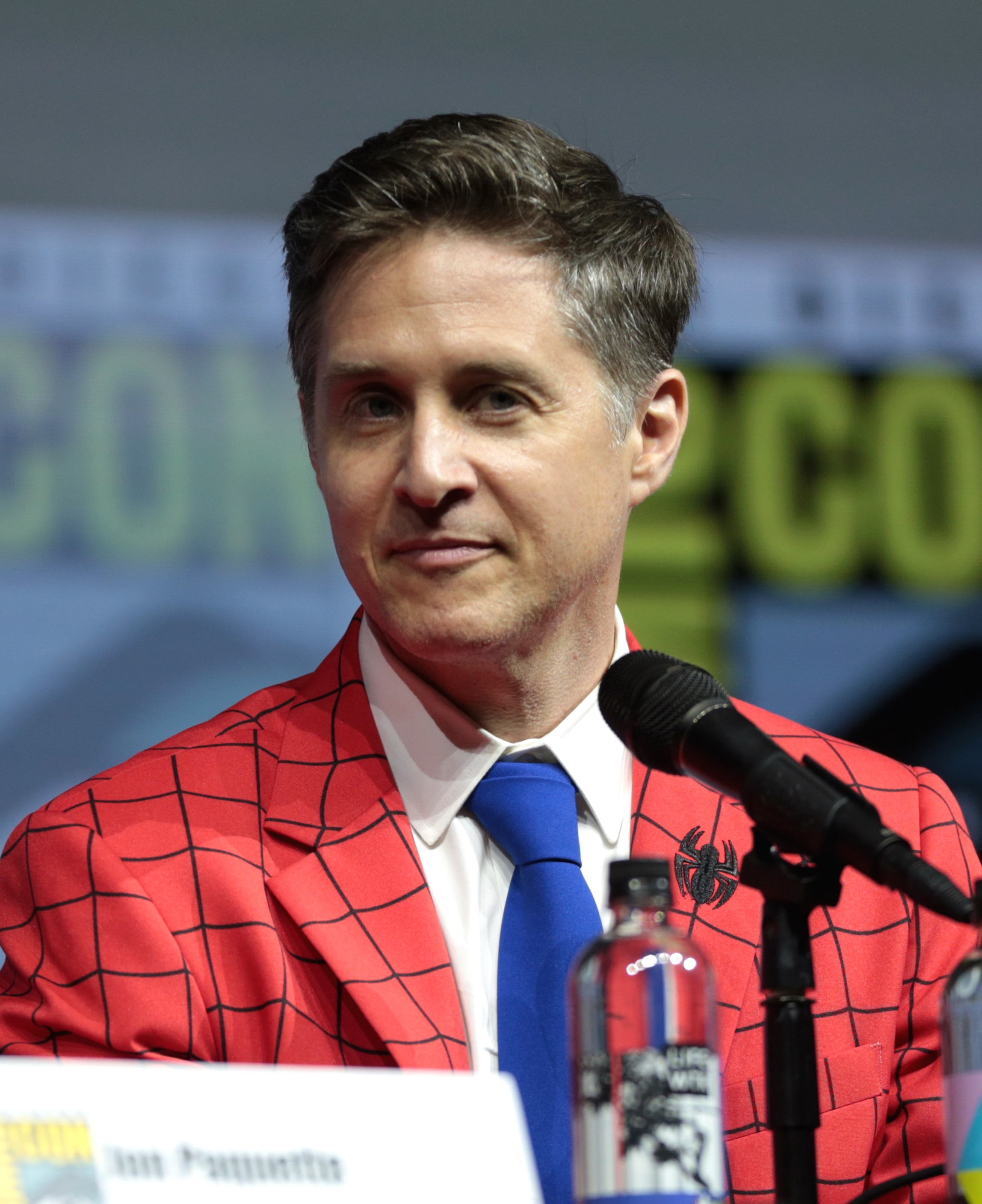
Yuri Lowenthal in 2018

Barnaby has been a popular character in Japan, taking second place in an AniGlobe poll behind Kotetsu. He came second in a promo of a Tiger & Bunny: The Beginning poll, and fourth in a Yomerumo poll. Yuri Lowenthal's performance as the character's English voice was praised by Anime Herald and IndieWire.

ComicsAlliance described Barnaby's backstory as Bronze Age but also as evoking "reality TV and celebrity culture". Often seen as the least likable character as a result of his antisocial personality, they recommended fans read the manga, which is seen from his point of view. Allen Moody from THEM Anime Reviews regarded Barnaby as a more central focus of the story than Kotetsu because his quest for vengeance leads him to find several of the series' antagonists, whose multiple twists are novel even if they are used several times in the media.

Anime Network's Seb Reid described the shows as well-written and a "pleasure to watch". He appreciated the lighthearted tone, which showed that superheroes do not need to "be dark and husky-voiced". Reid said the series improved as it progressed and revealed more about Barnaby's backstory and the mystery regarding his parents' death. Anime News Network praised how Barnaby's nickname, which he hates, is the solution to his restoring his original memories after being brainwashed by the enemy, in the television series, and that the code number that obsessed him was his dead parents' last message to him. But Comic Book Resources thought that Barnaby's revenge character arc was not fully closed in the series, and hoped the sequel would focus on this.

IndieWire felt that it was obvious that the duo wins their final fight, but that the directing of the series' retained interest, Charles Solomon saying that Tiger & Bunny demonstrated that although the concept of a "mismatched duo" is not original, it is "infinitely recyclable". Syfy's Michelle Villanueva commended the characters' relationship, saying the show "excels with the Buddy Cop trope" and that she enjoyed the characters' banter and growth from reluctant teammates to best friends. Chris Beveridge also praised the relationship and its comedy. He said the fact that both characters were adult enhanced the relationship, and the show, and made it a "treat to watch".

In regards for the movie, ComicBookBin praised the handling of both characters and the closer focus on Barnaby's past in the manga adaptation and the first film. Rice Digital enjoyed the handling of the duo as they initially break up but return to being a duo. IndieWire praised how, despite the events of the movie taking place after the television series, Kotetsu and Barnaby's interactions were appealing and comical. Anime News Network, however, compared the two heroes to lovers, saying their inability to separate, in the television series and the films, made the plot repetitive, while Kotaku lamented that the differences between Barnaby and Kotetsu's stories in the movie left Barnaby's role unmemorable, and that the CGI was poor at depicting him interacting with Kotetsu in their suits.
