= Rage of Bahamut =

2011 video game

- Developer(s): Cygames
- Publisher(s): DeNA
- Composer(s): Norihiro Furukawa; Rei Ishizuka; Tsubasa Itou; Kohei Otsuka; Takatsugu Wakabayashi; Yoshiki Kondou
- Platform(s): Mobage, Android, iOS
- Release: September 1, 2011 (Mobage); January 1, 2012 (Android); April 12, 2012 (iOS)
- Genre(s): Collectible card game

Rage of Bahamut (神撃のバハムート, Shingeki no Bahamūto) is a digital collectible card battle game developed by Cygames and published by DeNA. It was a social card game released on Mobage's mobile game network, in Japan in 2011 and worldwide in 2012.

The game exceeded three million players outside Japan on August 7, 2012. The game had over 10 million players worldwide as of December 2012. Rage of Bahamut was launched worldwide in February 2012 and topped the Top Grossing Chart on US Google Play for over 16 weeks starting in April. The game had a monthly revenue of ¥400 million ($5.01 million) in 2012.

The original Rage of Bahamut (Shingeki no Bahamut) is a fantasy adventure game in which players roam the world, drawing out powers from cards. After choosing between 'Man', 'Gods' or 'Demons' cards, players build and strengthen themselves as well as their teams by collecting, synthesizing and evolving a variety of unique cards.

The cards are then used in various team oriented activities such as order vs. order 'Holy Wars' or order vs. game events such as Dragon's Awakening, or Hermit in the Hood.

Three anime series have been adapted from the game, Rage of Bahamut: Genesis, Rage of Bahamut: Virgin Soul, and Manaria Friends.

== Holy Wars ==
Holy Wars are periods averaging five days in length in which groups of players (orders) work to try and defeat each other. Every successful attack and defeat of an opposing player earns points for the player and the order, as well as adding one 'link' to the attack chain. Whichever order has the most points at the end of a battle period wins. Battle periods typically last 90–120 [60 min in US version] minutes. During battles order members usually utilize 'Holy Powder' to fuel their attacks and create attack chains which further multiply 'Holy War Points'. Successful player vs. player (PVP) attacks and wall/castle attacks give 'Spell Power' points as well which are used to boost the entire order's or a specific members's attack, defense, and holy war points earned.

== Development ==
In Japan, the original Rage of Bahamut is provided as a HTML-based browser game on the domestic Mobage's network, which is operated by DeNA Co., Ltd. On Mobage's worldwide network, Rage of Bahamut is provided as smartphone app for both Android and iOS users. The English-language game was shut down on February 29, 2016.
