= Keiichi Sato =

Japanese animation director, mecha and character designer (born 1965)

Keiichi Sato (さとう けいいち, Satō Keiichi; born December 18, 1965) is a Japanese animation director, mecha and character designer born in Kagawa Prefecture.

In 1996, Sato met with Kazuyoshi Katayama to begin work on The Big O. Until then, Sato's work consisted mainly of designing characters and supervising animation for anime series. The Big O is the first based on a concept of his creation and he considers it his magnum opus. Sato's style is influenced by his "love of all things nostalgic."

== Filmography ==
=== Director ===
- Karas (2005)
- Tiger & Bunny (2011)
- Asura (2012)
- Black Butler (2014)
- Saint Seiya: Legend of Sanctuary (2014)
- Rage of Bahamut: Genesis (2014)
- Gantz: O (2016, chief director)
- Rage of Bahamut: Virgin Soul (2017)
- Inuyashiki (2017, chief director)
- Go! Go! Loser Ranger! (2024)

=== Other ===
- Mobile Suit Gundam: Char's Counterattack (Key Animation)
- Genesis Survivor Gaiarth (Animation Director (ep. 3))
- Giant Robo (Animation supervisor)
- Mobile Suit Victory Gundam (Animation Director)
- Fatal Fury: The Motion Picture (Key Animation)
- Junkers Come Here (Original Character Design)
- The Brave of Gold Goldran (Animation Director (eps. 12, 16, 21))
- Brave Command Dagwon (Opening Animation (op1))
- Ninja Resurrection (Character Design, Chief Animation Director)
- Urotsukidoji (Character Design)
- City Hunter: Goodbye my Sweetheart (Character design, Chief animation supervisor)
- Sentimental Graffiti (Visual director)
- City Hunter: Death of the Vicious Criminal Ryo Saeba (Character design)
- The Big O (Original concept, Character design, Mecha designer)
- The SoulTaker (Storyboard (ep. 5), Creature design, OP director)
- Mazinkaiser (Mecha design)
- Wolf's Rain (Animation director)
- Mazinkaiser: Shitou! Ankoku Daishogun (Mecha design)
- Mobile Suit Gundam Unicorn (Animation Director (ep. 1))
- C (Conceptual Design)
- Unofficial Sentai Akibaranger (Character design)
