= Tiger & Bunny =

Japanese anime television series

- Genre: Adventure, comedy, superhero
- Created by: Sunrise (season 1); BN Pictures (2)
- Anime television series
- Directed by: Keiichi Sato; Kunihiro Mori (Chief, #14-25)
- Produced by: Hiroo Maruyama; Chinatsu Matsui; Kazuhiko Tamura
- Written by: Masafumi Nishida
- Music by: Yoshihiro Ike
- Studio: Sunrise (Note: As of 2015, the copyright for the series was transferred to BN Pictures.)
- Licensed by: AUS: Siren Visual; NA: Viz Media; SEA: Muse Communication; UK: Kazé UK
- Original network: Tokyo MX, BS11, MBS
- English network: NA: Neon Alley
- Original run: April 3, 2011 – September 18, 2011
- Episodes: 25
- Manga
- Written by: Sunrise
- Illustrated by: Mizuki Sakakibara
- Published by: Kadokawa Shoten
- English publisher: Viz Media
- Magazine: Newtype Ace
- Original run: September 10, 2011 – December 16, 2014
- Volumes: 9
- Manga

Tiger & Bunny: The Comic
- Written by: Erika Yoshida
- Illustrated by: Hiroshi Ueda
- Published by: Shueisha
- Magazine: Miracle Jump
- Original run: October 11, 2011 – September 23, 2016
- Volumes: 7
- Anime film

Tiger & Bunny: The Beginning
- Directed by: Yoshitomo Yonetani
- Written by: Masafumi Nishida
- Music by: Yoshihiro Ike
- Studio: Sunrise
- Licensed by: AUS: Siren Visual; NA: Viz Media; UK: Anime Limited
- Released: September 22, 2012
- Runtime: 90 minutes
- Original net animation

Tiger & Bunny 2
- Directed by: Mitsuko Kase
- Written by: Masafumi Nishida
- Music by: Yoshihiro Ike
- Studio: BN Pictures
- Licensed by: Netflix
- Released: April 8, 2022 – October 7, 2022
- Episodes: 25
- Manga

Tiger & Bunny 2 The Comic
- Written by: Erika Yoshida
- Illustrated by: Hiroshi Ueda
- Published by: Shueisha
- Magazine: Tonari no Young Jump
- Original run: April 15, 2022 – present
- Volumes: 2
- Manga
- Written by: Mizuki Sakakibara
- Published by: Kadokawa Shoten
- Magazine: Comic Newtype
- Original run: April 2022 – present
- Movies
- Tiger & Bunny: The Rising
- Related
- Double Decker! Doug & Kirill
- icon

Tiger & Bunny (stylized in all caps) is a 2011 Japanese anime superhero television series produced by Sunrise and directed by Keiichi Sato. The screenplay was written by Masafumi Nishida with original character design by Masakazu Katsura. The series began its broadcast run in Japan on April 3, 2011, on Tokyo MX, followed by rebroadcasts on BS11 and MBS, and ended on September 17, 2011. Viz Media simulcast the series on Hulu and Anime News Network. It is set in a futuristic city where heroes fight crime while promoting corporate sponsors in a popular TV show, "Hero TV". The series focuses on the old-fashioned hero Kotetsu T. Kaburagi "Wild Tiger" and the rookie hero Barnaby Brooks Jr. "Bunny", who are forced to work together by their employers.

The series was mainly spearheaded by executive producer Masayuki Ozaki, who wanted to create a drama to appeal to several demographics by using several kinds of superheroes and balance the bond between the contrasting Kotetsu and Barnaby. Critical response to the anime praised its production values and portrayal of superheroes.

A one-shot manga drawn by Masakazu Katsura was published in Shueisha's Weekly Young Jump magazine on August 4, 2011 and the production of two films based on the series were announced during a special event in November 2011. The first film, entitled Tiger & Bunny: The Beginning was released on September 22, 2012. The second film, Tiger & Bunny: The Rising, was released on February 8, 2014.

As of 2015, the copyright for the work was transferred from Sunrise to Bandai Namco Pictures which led to them producing a sequel titled Tiger & Bunny 2 which was released on Netflix on April 8, 2022, as an original net animation.

== Plot ==
The series takes place in "NC 1978" in a re-imagined version of New York City called Stern Bild City, where 45 years before, superpowered individuals known as "NEXT" (an acronym for "Noted Entities with eXtraordinary Talents") started appearing. Some of them became superheroes. Each of the city's most famous superheroes work for a sponsor company and their uniforms also contain advertising for real-life companies. Their heroic activity is broadcast on the popular television show "Hero TV", where they accumulate points for each heroic feat accomplished (arresting criminals or saving civilians, for example) and the best ranked hero of the season is crowned "King of Heroes".

The story mainly focuses on veteran hero Kotetsu T. Kaburagi, a.k.a. Wild Tiger, who is assigned a new partner: a young man with the same power named Barnaby Brooks Jr. However, Barnaby and Kotetsu have conflicting opinions on how a superhero should act as they investigate the murder of Barnaby's parents. In addition, the appearance of a homicidal vigilante NEXT named "Lunatic" makes the public question the place of heroes in the city.

While the story has a villain of the week structure, an overarching narrative focuses on the unsolved murder of Barnaby's parents. Although the series' first half sees Barnaby defeat the apparent murderer, thanks to Kotetsu, the second half reveals the true culprit is unknown. In the second half, Kotetsu becomes conflicted between his loyalty to Barnaby's quest and taking care of his young daughter Kaede. Kotetsu learns his powers will eventually disappear leading him to abandon his job. Barnaby feels betrayed by Kotetsu, who does not tell him the true reason he's retiring. One of Barnaby's caretakers plans to take over the hero system. He brainwashes all the heroes to kill Kotetsu and creates a series of robots to replace them. With Kaede's help, Kotetsu helps most of their allies recover their memories. After their eventual victory, Kotetsu confesses the real reason for his retirement to his allies. Finally, Kotetsu decides to remain as a superhero even though his powers will become more limited.

== Production ==
The series was spearheaded by executive producer Masayuki Ozaki and director Keiichi Sato. Sato wanted a story about heroes with mundane problems. Ozaki wanted to depict the "conflict and drama one sees when they've belonged to an organization for a while". The project idea came from watching a news item on the controversy over the competition swimsuits in the Beijing Olympics. He saw an interview that stated a specific swimsuit style would give swimmers a better chance at setting a record, but the athletes who had contracts with Japanese companies couldn't wear it. Taking the director's idea, they decided to make a story of heroes who have to bear the weight of sponsors and depict the conflict, drama, and cultures it entails.

Manga artist Masakazu Katsura was chosen as the series' artist due to his large amount of works involving superheroes most notably Zetman and Wing-Man as well as attractive female characters. Katsura was surprised upon being hired for such series. The team had character concepts when starting, their superpowers and animal motifs. However, their abilities and personalities were vague until Katsura started the designs. Once Katsura finished his sketches, the Sunrise staff came up with ideas for their traits. The character Seymour became the hero name "Fire Emblem". However, this was not a direct reference to Nintendo's video games with the same name.

Most characters are depicted entirely through CG since their costumes were designed to show industry logos that would change over time. Blue Rose is the only character that is frequently hand drawn. Another reason was that they were mindful of the international market. People around the world are most used to seeing CG animation as the visual style because of Pixar and Disney. Due to this they thought CG had the most universality so they designed each hero in CG.

=== Marketing ===
Each of the heroes in the series is sponsored by fictional and non-fictional companies. These include large brands such as Pepsi (Suntory) and Bandai, others are Amazon.com.jp, SoftBank, UStream, Gyu-Kaku, and Domino's Pizza. The company logos are not visible in the manga adaptation nor the episodes on Netflix. In September 2011, Bandai's Tamashii Nations division released a series of figures under their S.H. Figuarts line. The first of these was a Wild Tiger action figure. The figure was a success, with most Japanese retailers/dealers being caught off guard and the figure selling out quickly. The next to be released was a Barnaby Brooks Jr. (a.k.a. Bunny) action figure, followed by figures of Rock Bison and Sky High. All of the figures feature diecast metal parts and sponsor logos printed on the armor, such as Softbank & Amazon.jp.

Although Ozaki considered the series having 25 episodes to be too little, he wanted to tell the story of anime himself. While the main focus of the story was to tell the relationship between Kotetsu and Barnaby, the team faced difficulties to give all the other secondary characters proper screentime. Ozaki had already in mind the idea of giving Tiger & Bunny a sequel back in 2011. The usage of logos was thought ahead to properly make them work in English regions, especially with the company Viz Media. This has also led to directly to collect the series' episodes in Blu-ray volumes in order to appeal to the global market.

=== Writing ===
The writer was Masafumi Nishida. He learned of the project during the fall of 2009. At that time he was quite busy working on some other scripts, so initially, he refused to write for the show. However, the staff asked him to at least meet up with them, so he did. Sunrise told him they want to create an anime featuring older men that would excite the viewers. He had yet to write a scenario for an anime series back then, but the staff told him they had seen my stage plays. They asked if he could write something similar to those, with realistic conversations. Nishida thought it was really interesting and agreed to work. At that time he wanted to write a novel featuring sentai heroes from the perspective of their everyday lives. So he decided to run with this idea while writing for Tiger & Bunny. However, the hero genre has a lot of things that almost never change – for example, the red ranger is always the leader. So he thought it would be interesting to break those rules and create something new. In his novel, he wanted the pink ranger to be the red ranger's ex-girlfriend who is now going out with the blue ranger. Nishida also wanted to write about a hero who is taking care of his parents. He wanted to describe their everyday lives and family problems because he thinks that by showing the parts of them that were not really heroic he can make them even more appealing. This resulted in the creation of most of the heroes.

The staff was inspired by the superhero's stories and how they are handled by sponsors. There was a conflict with having a sponsor which delayed the development. Kotetsu was created to be a quirky anime main character due to their notable facial hair and his being far older in contrast to younger heroes. As a result, the series was created to appeal to an older audience. Furthermore, Bandai wanted to aim the series not only to a Japanese audience but a worldwide audience, so the setting is a Manhattan-like city, with the characters being racially diverse. Two main themes involving the leads involve Kotetsu's refusal to give up and his bond with Burnaby. There were problems with promoting Seymour, Fire Emblem, due to his homosexuality. Ozaki was proud of the series, due to being an original story despite calling it traditional. While Kotetsu and Barnaby bond for the series' entire run, there was an agreement to focus on a build-up during the first half.

The two main characters are Kotetsu T. Kaburagi and Barnaby Brooks Jr., who are respectively voiced by Hiroaki Hirata and Masakazu Morita in Japanese. According to the director, Kotetsu's image was created to make it easy for Hirata to play him. However, Hirata still faced difficulties in portraying such a character. This was mostly due to his easygoing personality which contrasted with the more serious one he related more to. Their recording mics were always next to each other, and, unlike Hirata, Morita found Kotetsu as a helpful character to play along with. Morita felt that Barnaby was too antisocial until the fifth episode where he felt his character was for the first time having real interactions to which Hirata said that Morita was struggling in early episodes. During the series' second half, Barnaby developed his character which made him more pleasant to voice. Hirata felt that Barnaby was the same, claiming that his personality was that of the tsundere archetype who is awkward at displaying his emotions. Meanwhile, Kotetsu was noted to try to remain like an older man as a result of his age. The development of the main duo was originally left up to the audience's expectation until Nishida wrote the movie The Rising where there would be more pressure in regards to an official break up.

=== Release ===
The anime by Sunrise aired in Japan between April 3, 2011, and September 17, 2011. It was also simulcast with English subtitles on various streaming sites such as Hulu, Viz Media and Anime News Network. The anime has been licensed by Viz Media in North America and Kazé distributed through Manga Entertainment in the United Kingdom. For the first thirteen episodes, the opening theme is "Orion wo Nazoru" (オリオンをなぞる; "Trace of Orion") by Unison Square Garden, while the ending theme is "Hoshi no Sumika" (星のすみか; "A Star's Dwelling") by Aobouzu. For episodes fourteen onwards, the opening theme is "Missing Link" by Novels, while the ending theme is "Mind Game" by Tamaki.

The series began broadcasting in the United States and Canada on Viz Media's online network, Neon Alley, on October 2, 2012. On October 15, 2017, the series began running on Netflix.

On March 30, 2019, Nikkan Sports announced that a sequel to the original Tiger & Bunny series was currently in production. On April 2, 2020, the sequel was announced as Tiger & Bunny 2. Voice actors Hiroaki Hirata and Masakazu Morita returned to voice their respective characters. The anime was produced by studio Bandai Namco Pictures, with director Mitsuko Kase replacing director Keiichi Sato. The character designs were done by manga artist Masakazu Katsura. The sequel had 25 episodes, split into two cours. Its first 13 episodes premiered on April 8, 2022, on Netflix, and the remaining 12 episodes premiered on October 7, 2022. The opening theme is "kaleido proud fiesta" by Unison Square Garden, while the ending theme is "Aida" by Ano.

==== Films ====
The production of two films based on the series was announced during a special event on November 13, 2011. The first film, titled Tiger & Bunny: The Beginning was released in Japan on September 22, 2012, also receiving screenings in the United States, the United Kingdom and other countries, and was released on Blu-ray-Disc and DVD on February 22, 2013. The first half of the film recaps the first few episodes whilst also introducing a new story. A second film, Tiger & Bunny: The Rising, is an entirely new work which was released on February 8, 2014. The second movie takes place about a year after the anime finale, sometime around the epilogue, with Kotetsu's identity now public, and Tiger & Bunny return to their team dynamic.

== Related media ==
=== Manga ===
A one-shot manga drawn by Masakazu Katsura was released in Shueisha's Weekly Young Jump magazine on August 4, 2011, followed by a serialized manga series drawn by Hiroshi Ueda which began serialization in Miracle Jump magazine in October 2011. The manga, along with a 4-Panel Comic Anthology by various artists, has been licensed in North America by Viz Media and was released in 2013.

On March 12, 2022, two manga adaptations of the sequel series were announced. A manga adaptation written by Erika Yoshida and illustrated by Hiroshi Ueda titled Tiger & Bunny 2 The Comic began serialization in Shueisha's Tonari no Young Jump website on April 15, 2022. Another manga adaptation written and illustrated by Mizuki Sakakibara began serialization in Kadokawa Shoten's Comic Newtype website in April 2022.

=== Video games ===
A video game titled Tiger & Bunny On Air Jack! (TIGER&BUNNY オンエアジャック！, Taigā Ando Banī On Ea Jyakku!) was developed by Namco Bandai Games for the PlayStation Portable for release on September 20, 2012. The game was announced by Sunrise producer Masayuki Ozaki on July 31, 2011. A second game, Tiger & Bunny Heroes Day (TIGER&BUNNY～ヒーローズ デイ～, Taigā Ando Banī ~Hīrōzu Dei~), was released by D3 Publisher for the PlayStation Portable on March 20, 2013. Kotetsu and Barnaby also appeared in a collab for a mobile game, Tales of the Rays; alongside Blue Rose, Origami Cyclone, and Wind Wizard being costumes for Celsius (Tales of Eternia), Kyle Dunamis (Tales of Destiny 2), and Victor (Tales of Xillia 2) respectively.

=== Stage play ===
A stage play titled Tiger & Bunny the Live ran at Tokyo's Zepp Diver City theater from August 24 to September 1, 2012, featuring the voice actors for main characters Kotetsu T. Kaburagi and Barnaby Brooks Jr. reprising their roles. It also featured two new characters, Brian Vai and Babel.

=== Live-action film ===
On October 9, 2015, BN Pictures announced at their New York Comic Con panel that a live-action Hollywood film adaptation of Tiger & Bunny is in the works. The film will be produced by Ron Howard and Brian Grazer through their production company Imagine Entertainment and Global Road Entertainment, along with series producer Masayuki Ozaki from BNP and Sanford Climan and Annmarie Bailey through All Nippon Entertainment Works. Imagine's Erica Huggins will oversee the project.

=== Live-action TV series ===
On June 3, 2022, it was announced that BNP and SK Global are developing a live-action Tiger & Bunny series with M. Raven Metzner serving as writer and show-runner.

== Reception ==
=== Sales ===
The first Japanese Blu-ray volume opened as the week's fourth best selling animation Blu-ray and the fifth best selling Blu-ray overall, with 14,689 copies sold according to Oricon, and remained in the sales charts for an additional two weeks, selling a total of 19,656 copies. The DVD release of volume 1 also ranked in the charts, remaining for three weeks and selling a total of 2,521 copies. The second Blu-ray collection came second after Puella Magi Madoka Magica, remaining in the charts for two weeks. The third Blu-ray collection was the week's second best selling Blu-ray release, and the best selling anime release; first place overall being taken by Walt Disney Animation Studios' Tangled. The fourth Blu-ray collection also was the week's second best selling release, following Madoka Magica, staying in the charts for two weeks. The fifth Blu-ray collection also was the week's second best selling release after Madoka Magica and charted for two weeks. The sixth Blu-ray collection topped the charts of its week's release, being the best selling animated Blu-ray release, charting for two weeks. The seventh collection was the second best selling release after Persona 4: The Animation, also charting for two weeks. The eighth Blu-ray collection was the fourth best selling animation of its week's release, and sixth overall, once more charting for two weeks. The ninth and final collection topped the Blu-ray charts the week of its release, and charted for two weeks.

By the end of 2011, the second, third, and fourth Blu-ray collections were among the top 50 best-selling animation Blu-Rays discs. By its final volume, the combined total of the nine Blu-ray releases had sold 233,000 copies.

=== Critical response ===
The show's take on the superhero genre was singled out for praise by critics. Allen Moody of THEM Anime Reviews gave the series 4/5 stars, praising its ability to use familiar aspects of the genre in "novel ways". However, Moody states that the second half of the series would have benefitted from "a break or two"; especially regarding the last six episodes. IGN's Dale Bashir described the series as "unique", standing out because of its blend of Japanese and American superhero staples. In a retrospective review of anime from the 2010s, Lauren Orsini of Forbes described the anime as one of the best of 2011, describing it as a "love letter to the superhero genre" and enjoying its more optimistic tone compared to that of The Avengers. Similarly, Sage Ashford of Comic Book Resources described Tiger & Bunny as the fourth best superhero anime of the decade, pointing out that the heroes having real-life sponsors can be viewed as a commentary on modern-day superheroes. Echoing such statement, ComicsAlliance's Tom Speelman described the anime as not only being "genuinely gripping and engaging", but also a "smart exploration" of not only the superhero genre—with Kotetsu's genuine desire to help people evoking the Golden Age of Comic Books, while Barnaby's backstory the Bronze Age—but also "reality TV and celebrity culture". Anime Network's Seb Reid described the shows as well-written and a "pleasure to watch", and similarly to Orsini, also reacted positively to its lighthearted tone, showing that superheroes don't need to "be dark and husky-voiced". Seid took note that the series improved as it progressed and revealed more about Barnaby's backstory and the mystery regarding his parents' death. The Fandom Post's Chris Beveridge also commended the series in its use of the superhero genre by putting a "Japanese take on it".

Kotetsu and Barnaby and the relationship between them was received positively. Charles Solomon of IndieWire noted that while the concept of a "mismatched duo" is not original, it is "infinitely recyclable", something which Tiger & Bunny showcases through their relationship. Solomon also praised the English dub's voice actors for making the characters both believable and comedic. Orsini also took note of Kotetsu and Barnaby's relationship. Syfy's Michelle Villanueva also commended the characters' relationship, stating that the show "excels with the Buddy Cop trope" and enjoyed the Kotetsu and Barnaby growing from reluctant teammates to best friends, as well as their banter. Beveridge also praised their relationship, finding it appropriately comedic, opinionating that both characters being adults enhances their relationship and the show, making it a "treat to watch".

Regarding Kotetsu, Beveridge described him as the "conscience" of the show. Reid praised Kotetsu's Japanese voice actor—Hiroaki Hirata—for giving depth to the character, and also enjoyed latter episodes showcasing Kotetsu's motivations and relationship with his family; his relationship with his daughter Kaede being described as touching. However, Barnaby was often seen as the least likable character as result of his antisocial personality which is why ComicsAlliance recommended fans to read the manga which is seen from his own point of view and helps understand him more.

Critics reacted positively to the supporting characters in the series; Seid described it as "driven by its characters", who are the "true strength" of the series. Moody found all of the supporting heroes and Lunatic entertaining, though admonished the fact Rock Bison and Fire Emblem do not get any episodes focusing on them. Speelman also described the characters as being one viewers "grow to love", singling out Dragon Kid. Reid also described her as one of his favorite characters. Beveridge singled out Lunatic for being a menacing villain and adding a challenge to the main characters, also taking note of Martinez's role during the half-way point of the series.

There was also comments in regards to production values. Solomon praised the action sequences, as did Moody including the handling of CGI. Beveridge also commended the action sequences and described them as "great". Theron Martin of Anime News Network commented that while some parts of the animation were poorly done, the series was still enjoyable.
