= Hiroaki Hirata =

Japanese voice actor and narrator (born 1963)

- 平田 広明
- Born: August 7, 1963 (age 63); Tokyo, Japan
- Occupations: Actor; voice actor; narrator
- Years active: 1985–present
- Agent: Hirata Production Japan
- Website: www.hiratahiroaki.com

Hiroaki Hirata (平田 広明, Hirata Hiroaki; born August 7, 1963) is a Japanese actor, voice actor, and narrator. He is the founder of Hirata Production Japan.

He is best known for voicing Sanji in One Piece. Other notable roles include Sha Gojyo in Saiyuki, Kotetsu T. Kaburagi in Tiger & Bunny, Klein in Sword Art Online, Vergil in the Devil May Cry series, Mutta Nanba in Space Brothers, Leomon in Digimon Adventure, George Kodama in Kaze no Yojimbo, and Mr. Kondo in After the Rain. He is also the official Japanese dub-over artist for Johnny Depp, Matt Damon, Noah Wyle and Matt LeBlanc, in addition to dubbing roles of Jude Law, Ewan McGregor, Edward Norton and Josh Hartnett.

== Career ==
After graduating from Toshima High School, Hirata attended the Subaru Theater School before joining Theatre Company Subaru. His first stage performance was in A Midsummer Night's Dream in 1986. While he was working as a stage actor, his manager at the time asked him if he was interested in becoming a voice actor, and he auditioned. Since then, he has dubbed for many Western movies and worked in animation.

In 2011, he voiced the main character Kotetsu T. Kaburagi in the anime Tiger & Bunny and won the 11th Tokyo Anime Award for Best Voice Actor and the 6th Seiyu Awards for Best Actor in leading role. That same year, he left Theater Company Subaru, where he had worked for 27 years, and started a new company, Hirata Production Japan.

On January 9, 2017, Hirata was chosen 25th in the 3-hour voice actor general election special that broadcast on TV Asahi, where 200 popular voice actors were ranked.

== Filmography ==
=== Television animation ===
Year	Title	Role
1997	Detective Conan	Tomofumi Minami (ep. 51); Tadahiko Michiwaki (ep. 153–154); Yuji Kamekura (ep. 225); Otsuka (ep. 642); Iwao Takatori (ep. 913–914)
1999	Digimon Adventure	Narrator, Leomon, Hiroaki Ishida, Shellmon, Hagurumon, Megadramon
1999	Great Teacher Onizuka	Gibayashi
1999	Ojamajo Doremi	Yada's father, Kenzo Asuka (the father), etc.
2000	Digimon Adventure 02	Narrator, Hiroaki Ishida, Gennai, Takeru (adult)
2000	Gensomaden Saiyuki	Sha Gojyo
2000	One Piece	Vinsmoke Sanji, Carue, Inuppe, Demalo Black
2001	Digimon Tamers	Leomon
2001	Hajime no Ippo: The Fighting!	Okita Keigo
2001	Kaze no Yojimbo	George Kodama
2002	Kinnikuman Ni-sei	The Ninja
2003	Astro Boy	Jake
2003	Saiyuki Reload	Sha Gojyo
2003	Ashita no Nadja	Kakuro
2003	Inuyasha	Suikotsu
2003	Divergence Eve	Juuzou Kureha
2003	L/R: Licensed by Royalty	Jack Hofner
2003	Naruto	Genma Shiranui
2003	Petite Princess Yucie	Frederick
2004	DearS	Xaki
2004	Saiyuki Reload Gunlock	Sha Gojyo
2004	Elfen Lied	Professor Kakuzawa Yu
2004	Ghost in the Shell: S.A.C. 2nd GIG	Gino
2004	Monster	Lipsky
2004	Kyo Kara Maoh!	Geigen "Hube" Huber
2005	Gaiking: Legend of Daiku-Maryu	John
2005	Transformers: Cybertron	Live Convoy, Gasket, Lori's father
2005	Xenosaga: The Animation	Allen Ridgeley
2006	Hanbun no Tsuki ga Noboru Sora	Gorō Natsume
2006	Air Gear	Aeon Clock
2006	Ayakashi: Samurai Horror Tales	Iemon Tamiya
2006	Black Lagoon	Benny
2007	Claymore	Rubel
2007	Kekkaishi	Kaguro
2008	Naruto Shippuden	Genma Shiranui
2009	CANAAN	Santana
2009	Kaidan Restaurant	Ghastly Garçon(Waiter)
2009	Kuuchuu Buranko	Tatsurou Ikeyama
2009	Slayers Evolution-R	Dguld
2010	Digimon Xros Wars	Matadormon
2010	Marvel Anime: Iron Man	Ho Yinsen
2010	Senkou no Night Raid	Takachiho Isao
2011	Tiger & Bunny	Kotetsu T. Kaburagi / Wild Tiger
2011	Gintama	Terada Tatsugorō
2012	Another	Tatsuji Chibiki
2012	Space Brothers	Mutta Namba
2012	Sword Art Online	Klein / Tsuboi Ryōtarō
2012	Inazuma Eleven Go	Liu Bei
2012	From the New World	Kiroumaru
2013	Gingitsune	Yoshitomo Takami
2015	Digimon Adventure tri.	Leomon, Young Gennai
2015	Yatterman Night	Boyacky
2015	God Eater	Lindow Amamiya
2016	Qualidea Code	Kyūtoku Asanagi
2017	Saiyuki Reload Blast	General Kenren, Sha Gojyo
2017	Blue Exorcist: Kyoto Saga	Shiro Fujimoto
2017	Granblue Fantasy The Animation	Rackam
2018	B: The Beginning	Keith Kazama Flick
2018	After the Rain	Masami Kondo
2018	Banana Fish	Max Lobo
2018	Ace Attorney	Godot
2018	Gintama.	Terada Tatsugorō
2019	Astra Lost in Space	Noah Vix
2019	Granblue Fantasy The Animation Season 2	Rackam
2019	Special 7: Special Crime Investigation Unit	Warlock
2020	Warlords of Sigrdrifa	Ichiro Satomi
2020	The Millionaire Detective Balance: Unlimited	Frantz Weinski
2021	B: The Beginning Succession	Keith Kazama Flick
2021	My Hero Academia Season 5	Re-Destro / Rikiya Yotsubashi
2021	Fena: Pirate Princess	Otto
2021	The Night Beyond the Tricornered Window	Sensei
2022	Saiyuki Reload: Zeroin	Sha Gojyo
2022	Tiger & Bunny 2	Kotetsu T. Kaburagi / Wild Tiger
2022	My Hero Academia Season 6	Re-Destro / Rikiya Yotsubashi
2022	Made in Abyss: The Golden City of the Scorching Sun	Wazukyan
2023	Mashle: Magic and Muscles	Narrator
2024	Girls Band Cry	Hayashi
2025	Ameku M.D.: Doctor Detective	Kimiyasu Sakurai
2025	Ishura Season 2	Ozonezma the Capricious
2025	From Old Country Bumpkin to Master Swordsman	Beryl Gardinant
2025	Sanda	Saburō Yagiuda
2026	Akane-banashi	Ikken Arakawa

=== Original video animation (OVA) ===
- 2001 - Zaion: I Wish You Were Here (Changpuek)
- 2006 - Hellsing Ultimate OVA (Pip Bernadotte)
- 2007 - Strait Jacket (????) (Falk)
- 2007 - Saiyuki Reload: Burial, Sha Gojyo
- 2011 - Saiyuki Gaiden, General Kenren
- 2013 - Saiyuki Gaiden: Kouga no Shou, General Kenren

=== Original net animation (ONA) ===
- 2025 - Devil May Cry (Vergil)

=== Film animation ===
- Digimon Adventure (2000) (TV announcer, Adult Takeru "T.K." Takaishi)
- One Piece series (2001–) (Vinsmoke Sanji)
- Saiyuki: Requiem (2001) (Sha Gojyo)
- WXIII: Patlabor the Movie 3 (2002) (Shinichiro Hata)
- Ghost in the Shell 2: Innocence (2004) (Koga)
- Asura (2012) (Shichiro)
- Tiger & Bunny: The Beginning (2012) (Kotetsu T. Kaburagi / Wild Tiger)
- Tiger & Bunny: The Rising (2013) (Kotetsu T. Kaburagi / Wild Tiger)
- New Initial D: Legend 1 - Awakening (2014) (Bunta Fujiwara)
- Saint Seiya: Legend of Sanctuary (2014) (Cancer Deathmask)
- Crayon Shin-Chan: My Moving Story! Cactus Large Attack! (2015) (Mayor of Mexico)
- Digimon Adventure tri. (2015) (Narrator, Leomon, Gennai)
- Sword Art Online The Movie: Ordinal Scale (2017) (Klein / Ryōtarō Tsuboi)
- Maquia: When the Promised Flower Blooms (2018) (Baro)
- Pretty Cure Miracle Leap: A Strange Day with Everyone (2020) (Refrain)
- Burn the Witch (2020) (Billy Banx Jr.)
- Crayon Shin-chan: Crash! Rakuga Kingdom and Almost Four Heroes (2020) (Court painter)
- Kono Sekai no Tanoshimikata: Secret Story Film (2020) (Tamagoro Someya)
- Detective Conan: One-Eyed Flashback (2025) (Koji "Wani" Sametani)

=== Tokusatsu ===
2011

- Kaizoku Sentai Gokaiger (2011-2012) (Engine Machalcon (eps. 35 - 39, 41 - 44, 46 - 47, 49 - 50))

2012

- Unofficial Sentai Akibaranger (Delu Knight (eps. 10 - 12), Senmotorishimayaku Delu Knight (ep. 10))
- Kamen Rider Wizard (Narration)

2013

- Unofficial Sentai Akibaranger: Season Tsuu (Delu Knight (eps. 10 - 11))

2026

- Kamen Rider ZEZTZ (Catastrophe Gore Nightmare (eps. 41 - 42))

=== Video games ===
- Ace Combat 5: The Unsung War (2004) (Albert Genette)
- Namco × Capcom (2005) (Bruce McGivern, Kamuz)
- Kingdom Hearts II (2005) (Captain Jack Sparrow)
- Final Fantasy XII (2006) (Balthier)
- Sonic and the Black Knight (2009) (Caliburn/Excalibur)
- God Eater (2010) (Lindow Amamiya)
- The 3rd Birthday (2010) (Kunihiko Maeda)
- Dissidia 012 Final Fantasy (2011) (Laguna Loire)
- Ultimate Marvel vs. Capcom 3 (2011) (Vergil)
- Project X Zone (2012) (Lindow Amamiya)
- God Eater 2 (2013) (Lindow Amamiya)
- Sword Art Online: Infinity Moment (2013) as Klein
- Granblue Fantasy (2014) (Rackam)
- Sword Art Online: Hollow Fragment as Klein
- Devil May Cry 4: Special Edition (2015) (Vergil)
- Project X Zone 2 (2015) (Vergil)
- World of Final Fantasy (2016) (Balthier)
- Dissidia Final Fantasy Opera Omnia (2017) (Laguna Loire, Balthier)
- God Eater Resonant Ops (2018) (Lindow Amamiya)
- Kingdom Hearts III (2019) (Captain Jack Sparrow)
- Devil May Cry 5 (2019) (Vergil)
- Tokyo Afterschool Summoners (2019) (Tsukuyomi)
- Return to Shironagasu Island (2022) (Norman North)
- Teppen (2023) (Vergil)
- Sword Art Online: Last Recollection (2023) (Klein)
- Dissidia Duellum Final Fantasy (2026) (Balthier)

Unknown date

- Catherine (Orlando Haddick)
- Chaos Rings Omega (Veig/Olgar)
- Granado Espada (Raven)
- Heavy Rain (Norman Jayden)
- Jeanne d'Arc (video game) (Gilles de Rais)
- JoJo's Bizarre Adventure: All-Star Battle (Jean Pierre Polnareff)
- Metal Gear Rising: Revengeance (Samuel Rodrigues)
- Naruto series (Genma Shiranui)
- Ninja Gaiden 3 (Cliff Higgins)
- One Piece series (Vinsmoke Sanji)
- Spyro x Sparx: Tondemo Tours (Hunter the Cheetah (Gregg Berger))
- Tales of Innocence (Ricardo Soldato, Hypnos)
- Time Travelers (Kyugo Shindo)
- Xenosaga series (Allen Ridgeley).
- Live a Hero (Vulpecula)

=== Television drama ===
- Daddy Sister (2016)
- The 13 Lords of the Shogun (2022), Satake Yoshimasa
- The Old Dog, New Tricks? (2022), Minato
- Ishiko and Haneo: You're Suing Me? (2022), Riichiro Hyuga
- The Tiger and Her Wings (2024), Takei
- Unbound (2025), Magaribuchi Kagetsugu

=== Dubbing roles ===
==== Live action ====
Dubbing actor	Title	Role	Notes	Sources
Johnny Depp	Ed Wood	Ed Wood		
Johnny Depp	Don Juan DeMarco	John Arnold DeMarco/Don Juan		
Johnny Depp	Donnie Brasco	Joseph D. 'Joe' Pistone		
Johnny Depp	Fear and Loathing in Las Vegas	Raoul Duke	2014 Blu-ray and DVD edition	
Johnny Depp	The Astronaut's Wife	Spencer Armacost		
Johnny Depp	The Ninth Gate	Dean Corso		
Johnny Depp	Sleepy Hollow	Ichabod Crane		
Johnny Depp	Before Night Falls	Lieutenant Victor		
Johnny Depp	Chocolat	Roux		
Johnny Depp	The Man Who Cried	Cesar		
Johnny Depp	From Hell	Inspector Frederick Abberline		
Johnny Depp	Once Upon a Time in Mexico	Sands		
Johnny Depp	Pirates of the Caribbean: The Curse of the Black Pearl	Captain Jack Sparrow		
Johnny Depp	Finding Neverland	James Matthew Barrie		
Johnny Depp	The Libertine	John Wilmot		
Johnny Depp	Secret Window	Mort Rainey		
Johnny Depp	Pirates of the Caribbean: Dead Man's Chest	Jack Sparrow		
Johnny Depp	Pirates of the Caribbean: At World's End	Jack Sparrow		
Johnny Depp	Public Enemies	John Dillinger		
Johnny Depp	Alice in Wonderland	Mad Hatter		
Johnny Depp	The Tourist	Frank Tupelo		
Johnny Depp	Pirates of the Caribbean: On Stranger Tides	Jack Sparrow		
Johnny Depp	The Rum Diary	Paul Kemp		
Johnny Depp	Dark Shadows	Barnabas Collins		
Johnny Depp	The Lone Ranger	Tonto		
Johnny Depp	Transcendence	Dr. Will Caster		
Johnny Depp	Tusk	Guy LaPointe		
Johnny Depp	Mortdecai	Charlie Mortdecai		
Johnny Depp	Black Mass	James "Whitey" Bulger		
Johnny Depp	Alice Through the Looking Glass	Mad Hatter		
Johnny Depp	Fantastic Beasts and Where to Find Them	Gellert Grindelwald		
Johnny Depp	Yoga Hosers	Guy LaPointe		
Johnny Depp	Pirates of the Caribbean: Dead Men Tell No Tales	Jack Sparrow		
Johnny Depp	Murder on the Orient Express	Samuel Ratchett / John Cassetti		
Johnny Depp	Fantastic Beasts: The Crimes of Grindelwald	Gellert Grindelwald		
Johnny Depp	Waiting for the Barbarians	Colonel Joll		
Matt Damon	Geronimo: An American Legend	Britton Davis		
Matt Damon	Courage Under Fire	Andrew Ilario		
Matt Damon	The Rainmaker	Rudy Baylor		
Matt Damon	Saving Private Ryan	James Francis Ryan		
Matt Damon	All the Pretty Horses	John Grady Cole		
Matt Damon	The Bourne Identity	Jason Bourne		
Matt Damon	The Bourne Supremacy	Jason Bourne		
Matt Damon	The Bourne Ultimatum	Jason Bourne		
Matt Damon	Green Zone	Roy Miller		
Matt Damon	True Grit	Texas Ranger LaBoeuf		
Matt Damon	The Adjustment Bureau	David Norris		
Matt Damon	The Great Wall	William Garin		
Matt Damon	Jason Bourne	Jason Bourne		
Matt Damon	Downsizing	Paul Safranek		
Matt Damon	Ford v Ferrari	Carroll Shelby		
Matt Damon	The Last Duel	Sir Jean de Carrouges		
Matt Damon	Stillwater	Bill Baker		
Matt Damon	Oppenheimer	Leslie Groves		
Matt Damon	IF	Sunny		
Matt Damon	The Odyssey	Odysseus		
Jude Law	Wilde	Lord Alfred Douglas		
Jude Law	The Wisdom of Crocodiles	Steven Grlscz		
Jude Law	The Talented Mr. Ripley	Dickie Greenleaf		
Jude Law	Love, Honour and Obey	Jude		
Jude Law	Enemy at the Gates	Vasily Zaytsev		
Jude Law	Cold Mountain	W. P. Inman		
Jude Law	Breaking and Entering	Will Francis		
Jude Law	My Blueberry Nights	Jeremy		
Jude Law	Black Sea	Captain Robinson		
Ewan McGregor	Trainspotting	Mark "Rent Boy" Renton		
Ewan McGregor	The Island	Lincoln Six Echo		
Ewan McGregor	Deception	Jonathan McQuarry		
Ewan McGregor	Angels & Demons	Father Patrick McKenna		
Ewan McGregor	Perfect Sense	Michael		
Ewan McGregor	Our Kind of Traitor	Perry MacKendrick		
Ewan McGregor	T2 Trainspotting	Mark "Rent Boy" Renton		
Josh Hartnett	Pearl Harbor	Danny Walker		
Josh Hartnett	O	Hugo Goulding		
Josh Hartnett	Black Hawk Down	SSG Matt Eversmann	2004 TV Tokyo edition	
Josh Hartnett	Wicker Park	Matt Simon		
Josh Hartnett	Lucky Number Slevin	Slevin Kelevra / Henry		
Josh Hartnett	I Come with the Rain	Kline		
Edward Norton	The People vs. Larry Flynt	Alan Isaacman		
Edward Norton	Fight Club	Narrator		
Edward Norton	25th Hour	Montgomery "Monty" Brogan		
Edward Norton	The Italian Job	Steve Frazelli		
Edward Norton	Pride and Glory	Ray Tierney		
Edward Norton	Stone	Gerald "Stone" Creeson		
Matt LeBlanc	Friends	Joey Tribbiani		
Matt LeBlanc	Ed	Deuce Cooper		
Matt LeBlanc	Lost in Space	Major Don West		
Matt LeBlanc	Joey	Joey Tribbiani		
Matt LeBlanc	Episodes	Matt LeBlanc		
Ben Stiller	The Heartbreak Kid	Eddie Cantrow		
Ben Stiller	Meet the Parents	Greg Focker		
Ben Stiller	Meet the Fockers	Greg Focker		
Ben Stiller	Little Fockers	Greg Focker		
Joaquin Phoenix	8mm	Max California		
Joaquin Phoenix	Joker	Arthur Fleck / Joker		
Joaquin Phoenix	Joker: Folie à Deux	Arthur Fleck / Joker		
Joaquin Phoenix	The Yards	Willie Gutierrez		
Noah Wyle	ER	Dr. John Carter		
Noah Wyle	Fail Safe	Buck		
Noah Wyle	Falling Skies	Tom Mason		
Charlie Chaplin	The Count	Tailor's Apprentice	2014 Star Channel edition	
Charlie Chaplin	The Immigrant	Immigrant	2014 Star Channel edition	
Charlie Chaplin	The Vagabond	Saloon Violinist	2014 Star Channel edition	
Aamir Khan	3 Idiots	Rancho		
Aamir Khan	PK	PK		
Alexander Skarsgård	Battleship	Commander Stone Hopper		
Alexander Skarsgård	The East	Benji		
Konstantin Khabensky	Day Watch	Anton Gorodetsky		
Konstantin Khabensky	Night Watch	Anton Gorodetsky		
Vince Vaughn	The Lost World: Jurassic Park	Nick Van Owen		
Vince Vaughn	Psycho	Norman Bates		
Billy Crudup	Big Fish	Will		
Billy Crudup	Trust the Man	Tobey		
Mo Zinal	10,000 BC	Ka'Ren	2011 TV Asahi edition	
Dominic Cooper	Abraham Lincoln: Vampire Hunter	Henry Sturges		
Matt Dillon	Albino Alligator	Dova		
Michael J. Fox	The American President	Lewis Rothschild		
Emilio Estevez	Another Stakeout	Detective Bill Reimers		
Jonathan Rhys Meyers	August Rush	Louis Connelly		
Benicio del Toro	Basquiat	Benny Dalmau		
Stephen Dorff	Blade	Deacon Frost		
Bobby Cannavale	Blue Jasmine	Chili		
Keanu Reeves	Bram Stoker's Dracula	Johnathan Harker		
Ethan Hawke	Brooklyn's Finest	Detective Salvatore "Sal" Procida		
Matthew Broderick	The Cable Guy	Steven		
Jason Butler Harner	Changeling	Gordon Stewart Northcott		
Will Smith	Concussion	Dr. Bennet Omalu		
Carmine Giovinazzo	CSI: NY	Danny Messer		
Paul Walker	Eight Below	Jerry Shepard		
Marc Anthony	El Cantante	Héctor Lavoe		
Michael DeLuise	Encino Man	Matt		
Robert Downey Jr.	Eros	Nick Penrose		
Kevin Dillon	Escape from Absolom	Casey		
Steve Zahn	Forces of Nature	Alan		
Jim Caviezel	Frequency	John Francis "Johnny" Sullivan	2003 NTV edition	
Hugo Speer	The Full Monty	Guy		
Alan Cumming	Garfield: The Movie	Sir Roland		
Stephen Chow	God of Gamblers II	Chow Sing Cho		
Doug Hutchison	The Green Mile	Percy Wetmore		
Adrien Brody	Houdini	Harry Houdini		
Jim True	The Hudsucker Proxy	Clarence "Buzz" Gunderson		
Tom Hardy	Inception	Eames	2012 TV Asahi edition	
Paul Bettany	Inkheart	Dustfinger		
Brad Pitt	Interview with the Vampire	Louis de Pointe du Lac		
Henry Thomas	Legends of the Fall	Samuel Ludlow		
Owen Wilson	The Life Aquatic with Steve Zissou	Ned Plimpton		
Robert Vaughn	The Magnificent Seven	Lee	2013 Star Channel edition	
Scoot McNairy	Monsters	Andrew Kaulder		
Sam Rockwell	Moon	Sam Bell		
Supakorn Kitsuwon	Monrak Transistor	Pan		
Skeet Ulrich	The Newton Boys	Joe Newton		
Taz Skylar	One Piece	Vinsmoke Sanji		
Chang Chen	Red Cliff	Sun Quan		
Neal McDonough	Resident Evil: Welcome to Raccoon City	William Birkin		
Leigh Whannell	Saw	Adam		
Andrew Lauer	Screamers	Private Michael 'Ace' Jefferson		
Billy Zane	Sniper	Officer Richard Miller		
James Carrington	St. Elmo's Fire	Guy	2022 The Cinema edition	
Patrick Muldoon	Starship Troopers	Zander Barcalow		
James Marsden	Superman Returns	Richard White		
Lee Jung-jae	The Thieves	Popie		
Joseph Cotten	The Third Man	Holly Martins	New Era Movies edition	
Anthony Edwards	Top Gun	LTJG Nick "Goose" Bradshaw	2009 TV Tokyo edition	
Anthony Edwards	Top Gun: Maverick	LTJG Nick "Goose" Bradshaw		
James Franco	Tristan & Isolde	Tristan		
Liev Schreiber	Twilight	Jeff Willis		
Emory Cohen	Vincent N Roxxy	JC		
Jamie Foxx	White House Down	President James Sawyer		
Jeremy Sisto	White Squall	Frank Beaumont		
Taylor Kitsch	X-Men Origins: Wolverine	Gambit		
Michael Stuhlbarg	Your Honor	Jimmy Baxter		

==== Animation ====
Title	Role	Sources
Brother Bear	Denahi	
Rango	Rango	
Trolls World Tour	Hickory	
