= Sunshine City, Tokyo =

Building in Tokyo

Coordinates: 35°43′45″N 139°43′5″E

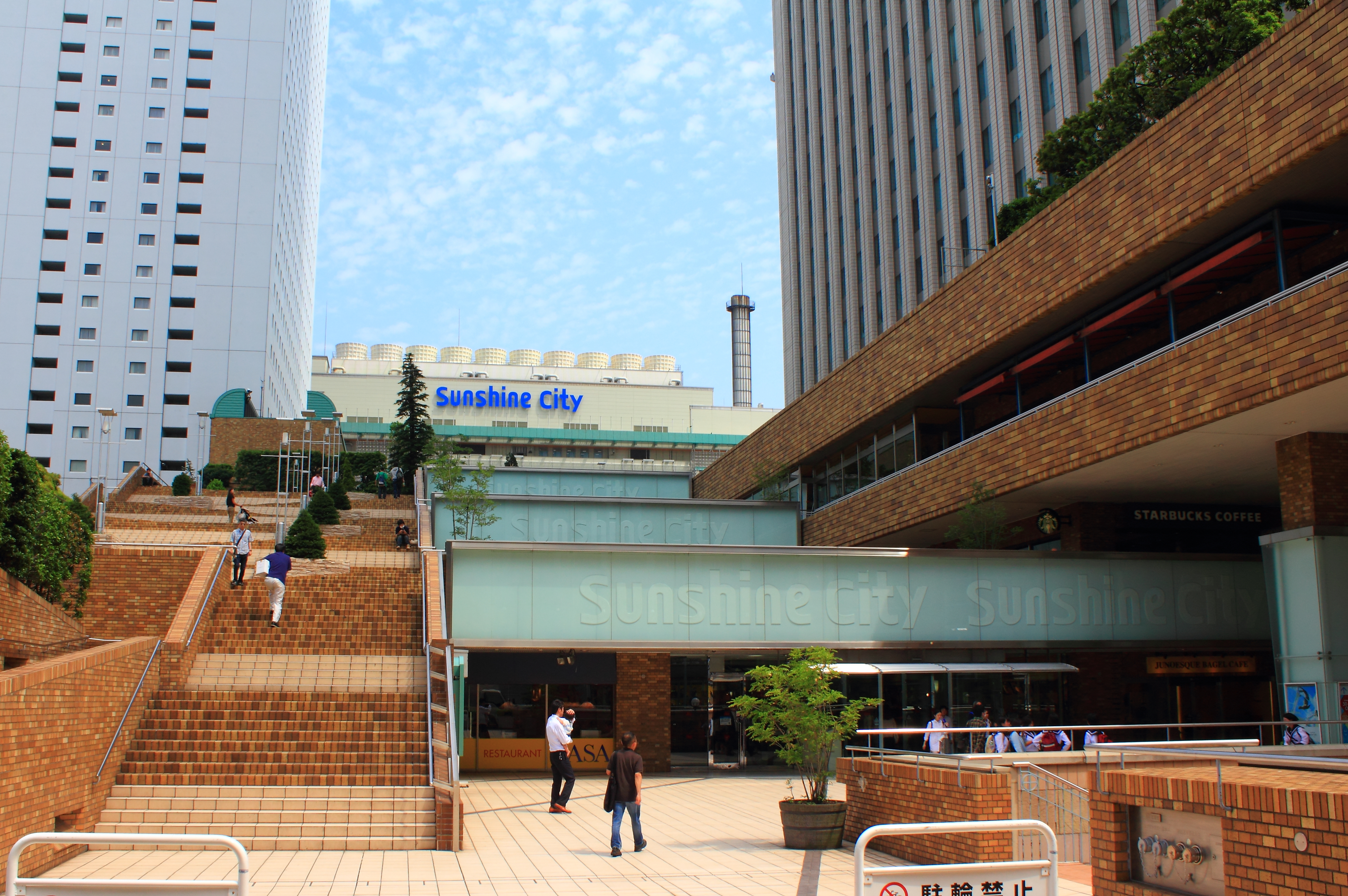
Sunshine City entrance

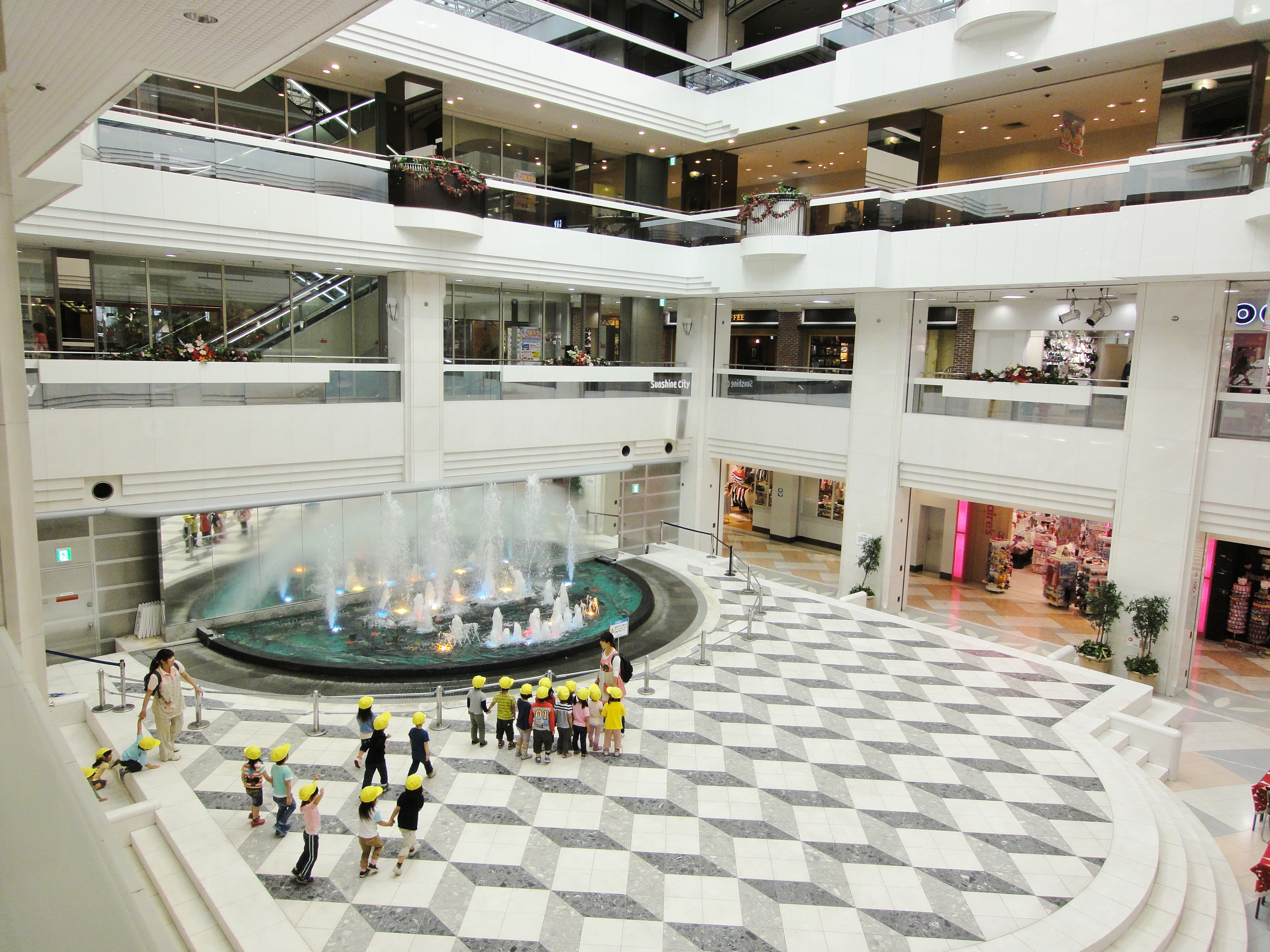
Sunshine City atrium

Sunshine City (サンシャインシティ, Sanshain Shiti) is a building complex located in East Ikebukuro, Toshima, Tokyo, Japan. It consists of four buildings: the 240-meter Sunshine 60 skyscraper, which includes corporate offices and restaurants; the Prince Hotel; the World Import Mart; and the Bunka Kaikan building. The complex sits on land once occupied by Sugamo Prison.

The lower floors cater toward passersby and customers, with a large shopping mall and numerous restaurants, while the higher floors tend to include corporate offices and hotel rooms. The complex, which was opened in 1978, contains numerous attractions including an observatory (observation deck) located at the top of Sunshine 60 called Sky Circus, the Ancient Orient Museum, an aquarium, a planetarium, the Prince Hotel, a Namco-run indoor amusement park, a convention centre, and a theatre.

When it was opened, Sunshine 60 office tower block was reputed to be the tallest building in Asia. It is an early example of a "city within a city", a self-contained area with places to live, work, and shop all within one area.

Since Sunshine 60's Sky Circus observatory was opened, other observation decks have opened in Tokyo, such as at Roppongi and the Tokyo Government offices.

== Attractions ==
=== Ancient Orient Museum ===
The Ancient Orient Museum (古代オリエント博物館, Kodai Oriento Hakubutsukan) is a small private museum in Sunshine City at the 7th floor of the Cultural Center (文化会館), specializing in artifacts of the ancient Near East and Central Asia. It has a collection of Greco-Buddhist art of Gandhara, and several pieces pertaining to the art of Palmyra and Persia.

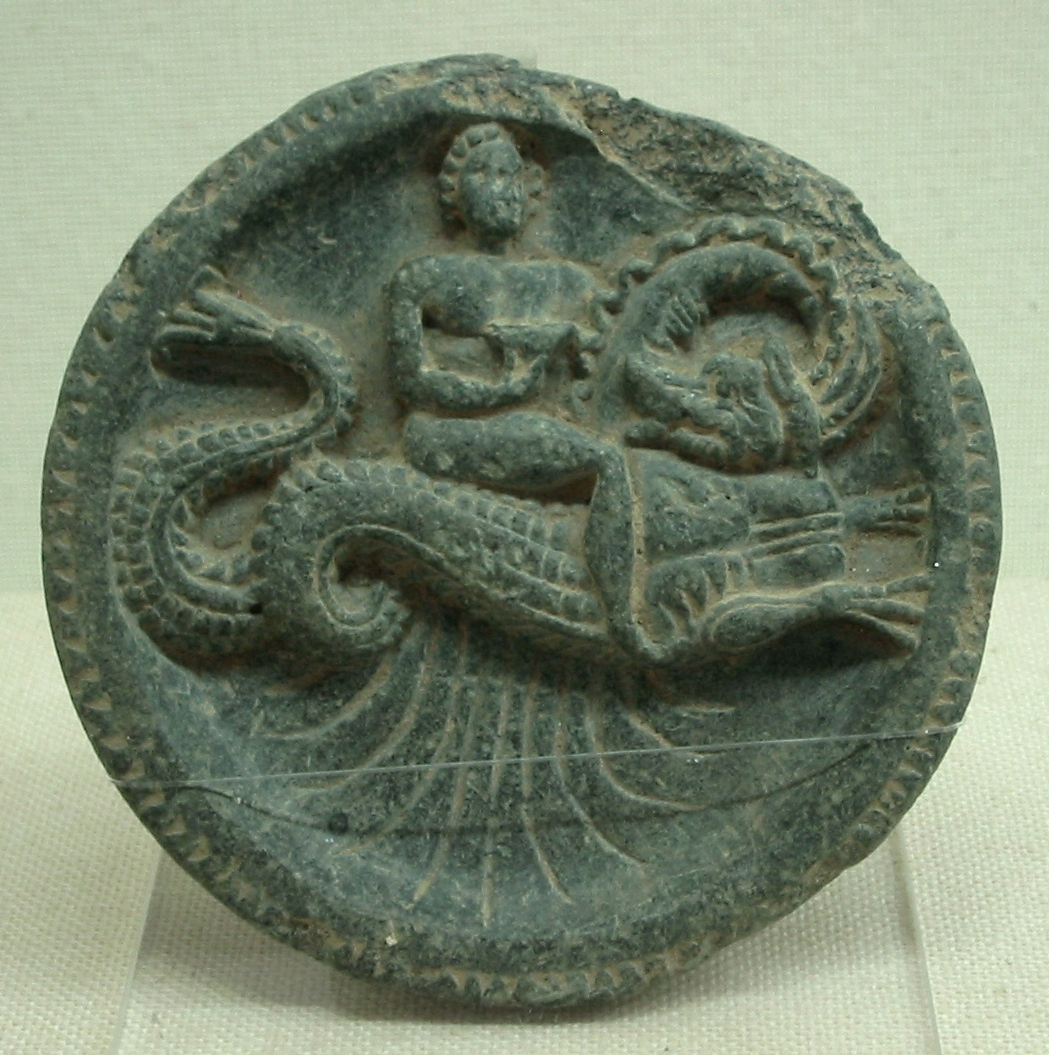
Gandhara stone palette

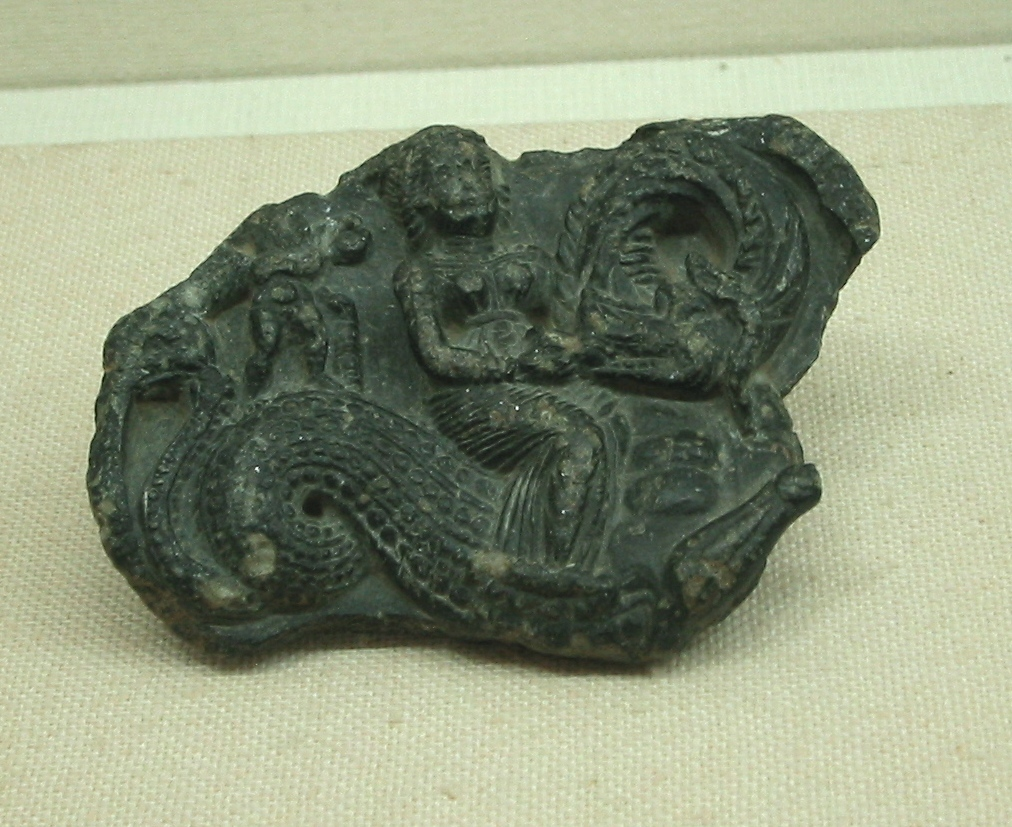
Fragment of a Gandhara stone palette

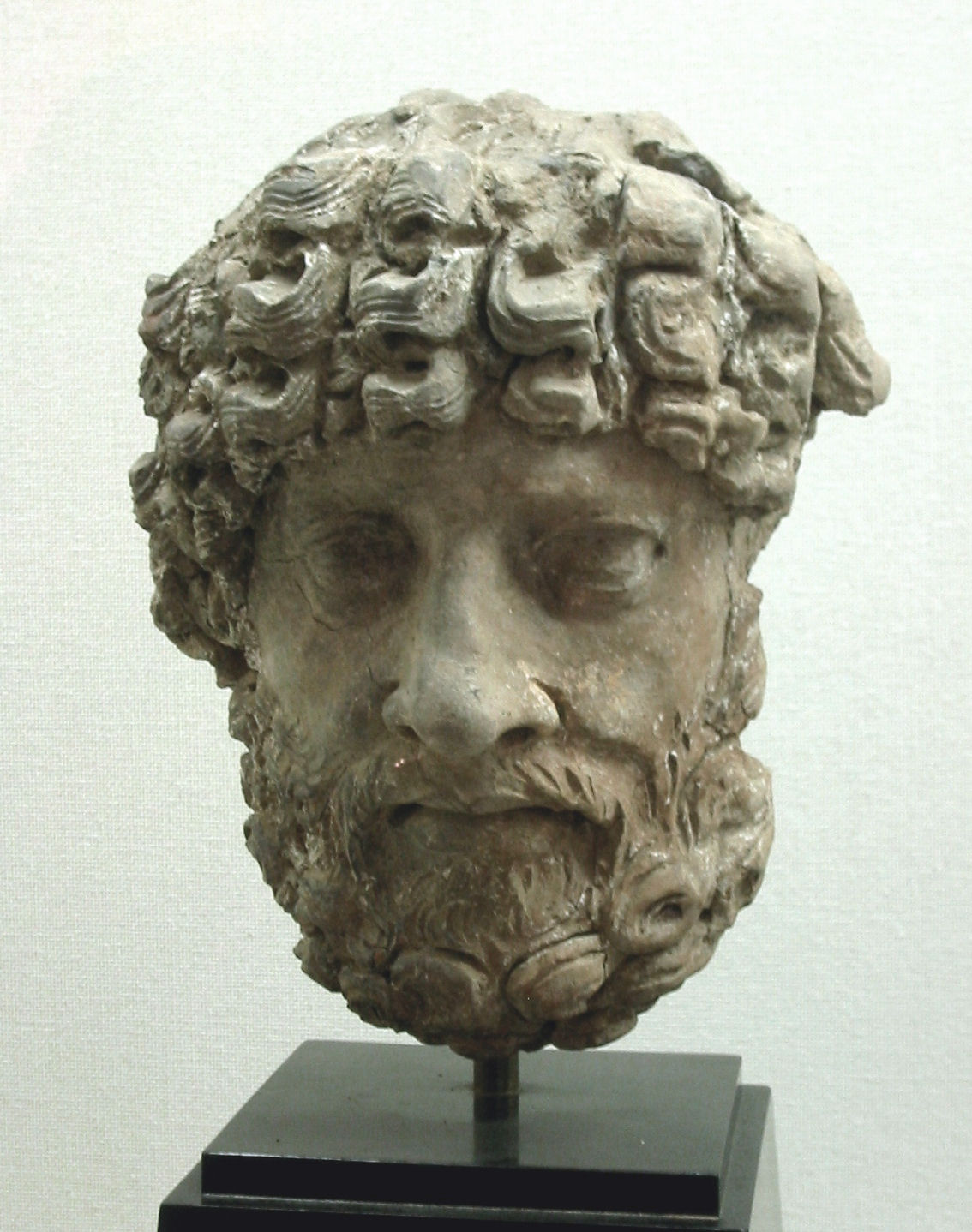
Gandhara Poseidon

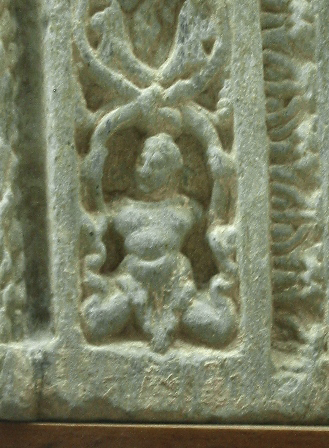
Gandhara Triton

=== Sunshine Aquarium ===
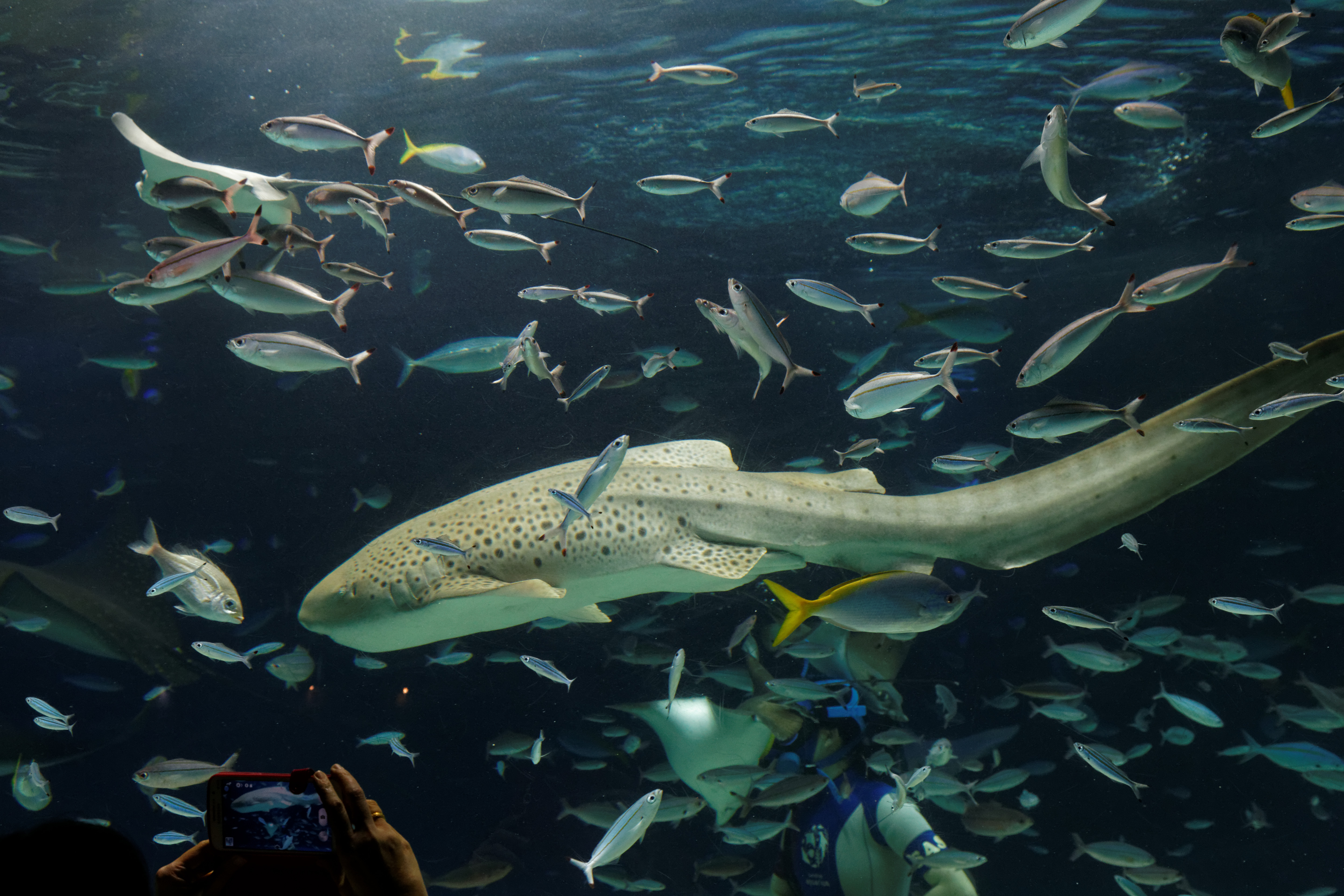
Main tanks "Sunshine lagoon"

Sunshine City World Import Mart is home to Japan's first rooftop public aquarium, which opened in October 1978. It is operated by Sunshine Enterprises, Inc. From 1978–2011, it was known as Sunshine International Aquarium. The aquarium was closed for one year from September 1, 2010 for a full renovation, and reopened on August 4, 2011.

=== Namco Namja Town ===
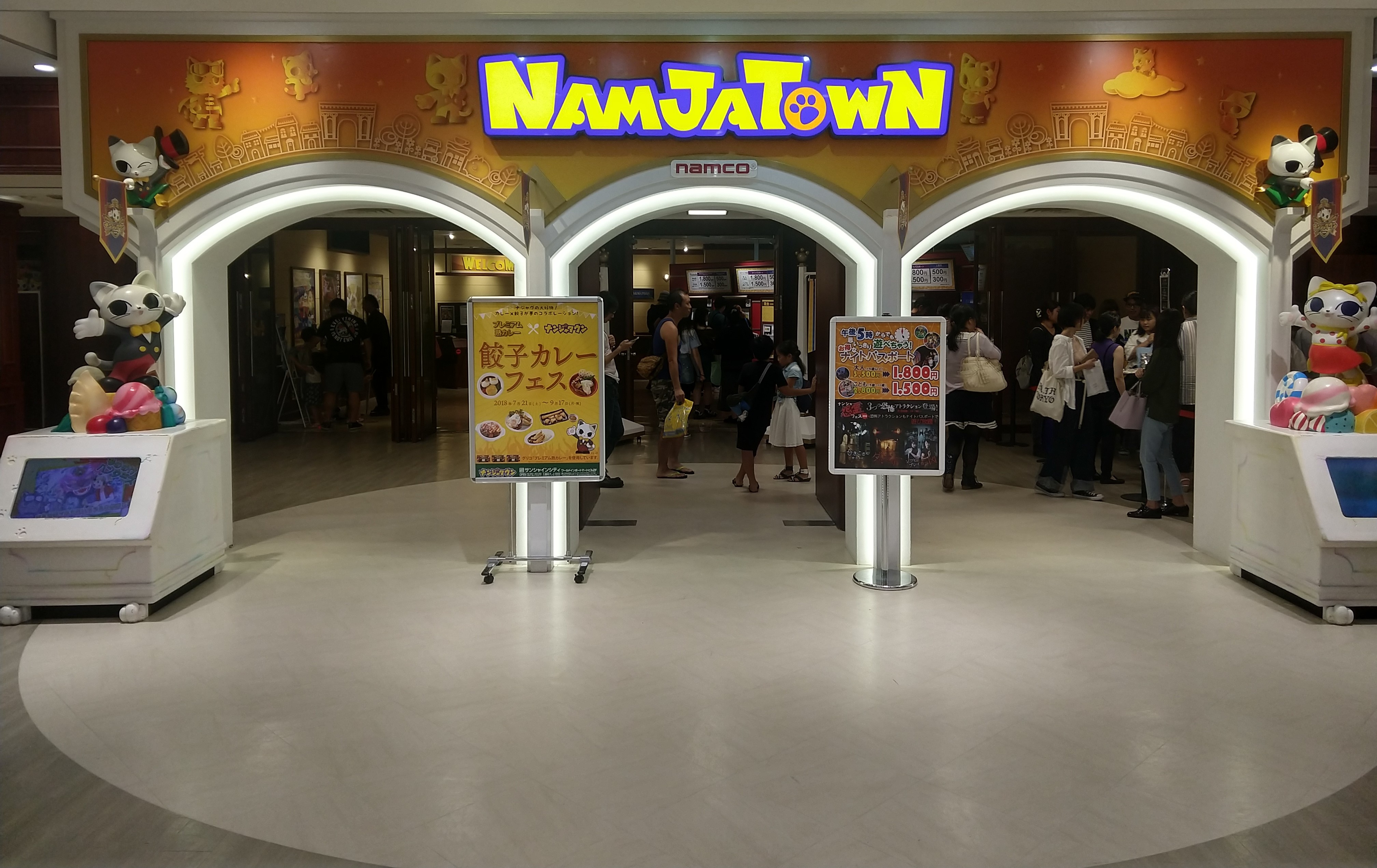
Namco Namja Town entrance

Namco Namja Town (ナムコナンジャータウン, Namuko Nanjā Taun) is an indoor theme park in the second floor of the Sunshine City shopping complex. The park was opened in 1996 by Namco, a Japanese company best known for producing video games, although the park itself does not completely focus on those games. Instead, it features themed dining, carnival-style games, a haunted house, and a line of character mascots exclusive to the park. Various promotions related to video games exist as well, often on a rotating basis. Namco developed two games based on the park; the first of which, Nakavu no Daiboken: My Favorite Namja Town, was released in 2000 for the PlayStation in Japan only, while a second game, simply titled Namja Town, was released for iOS in the early 2010s.

Namco also ran J-World Tokyo, a manga-themed park which opened in 2013 on the third floor immediately above Namja Town. J-World Tokyo closed on February 17, 2019 due to poor attendance.

== Sunshine City Prince Hotel ==
Sunshine City Prince Hotel was opened in 1980 (renovated in 1996) by Prince Hotel on the grounds of Sunshine City. Until the restructuring of the Seibu Group in March 2006, Seibu Railway, Kokudo, and other companies owned the Prince Hotel building, but this was the only property directly owned by Prince Hotel (the former company).

In 2007 (Heisei 19), the banquet halls on the 2nd and 3rd floors were closed and the head office of Prince Hotel Co., Ltd. moved to the former site, which will be used as a research facility after the head office relocates back to Diamond Gate Ikebukuro in 2019 (Heisei 31). In 2007, Trianon, a restaurant operated by the hotel on the 59th floor of Sunshine 60, and Windsor, the main bar on the first floor of the hotel, were also closed, and a Family Mart is now located on the site of Windsor.

The hotel underwent a four-year renovation starting in 2015 (Heisei 27), and in addition to the renovation of all guest room floors, a concept floor "IKEPRI 25" will be launched on April 6, 2019 (Heisei 31), on the 25th floor, targeting subculture fans, mainly anime and manga from Japan and abroad [12]. In conjunction with this, on July 15, 2016 (Heisei 28), the lobby lounge on the first floor was renovated into the "Chef's Palette" cafe and dining room, and the all-day dining function was transferred from the "Bayern" buffet restaurant on the basement floor. will no longer be open for breakfast, and "Bavaria" will once again become an all-day dining restaurant.

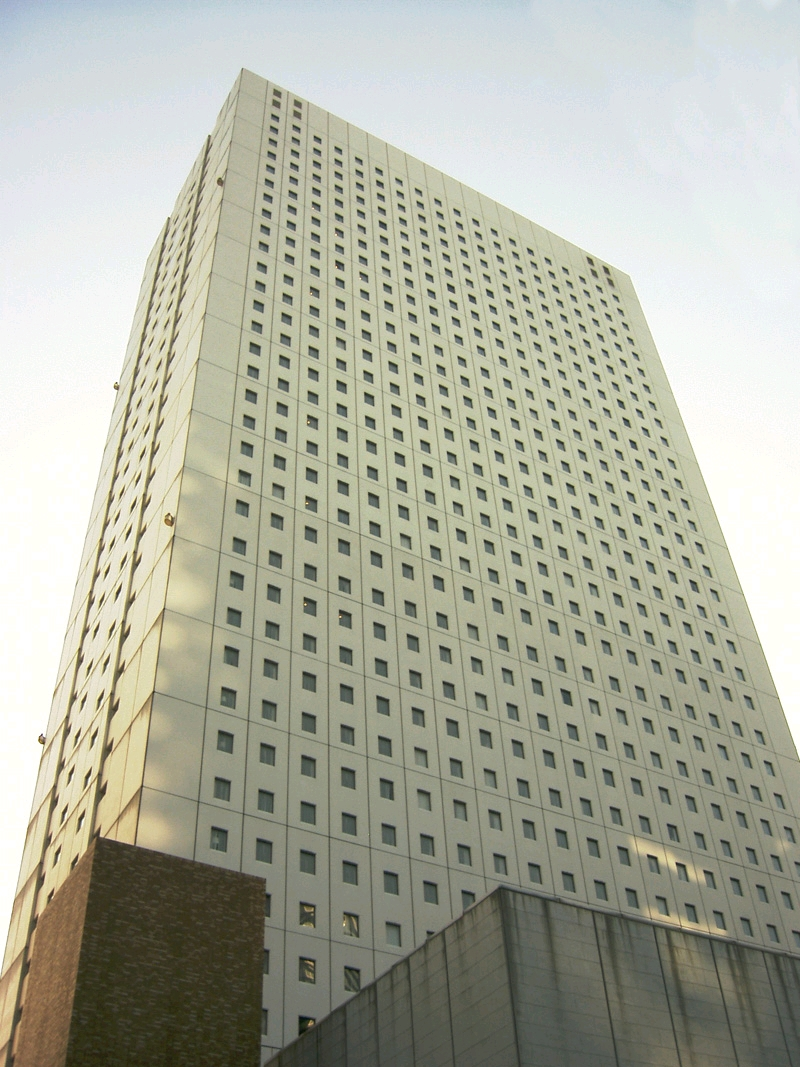
Exterior view of Sunshine City Prince Hotel

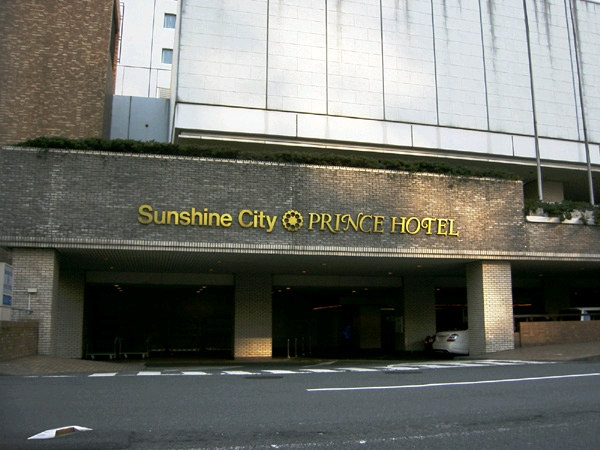
Entrance and Exit of Sunshine City Prince Hotel

== See also ==
- List of museums in Tokyo
- Sunshine Aquarium
