= Sunshine Aquarium =

Sunshine Aquarium (サンシャイン水族館
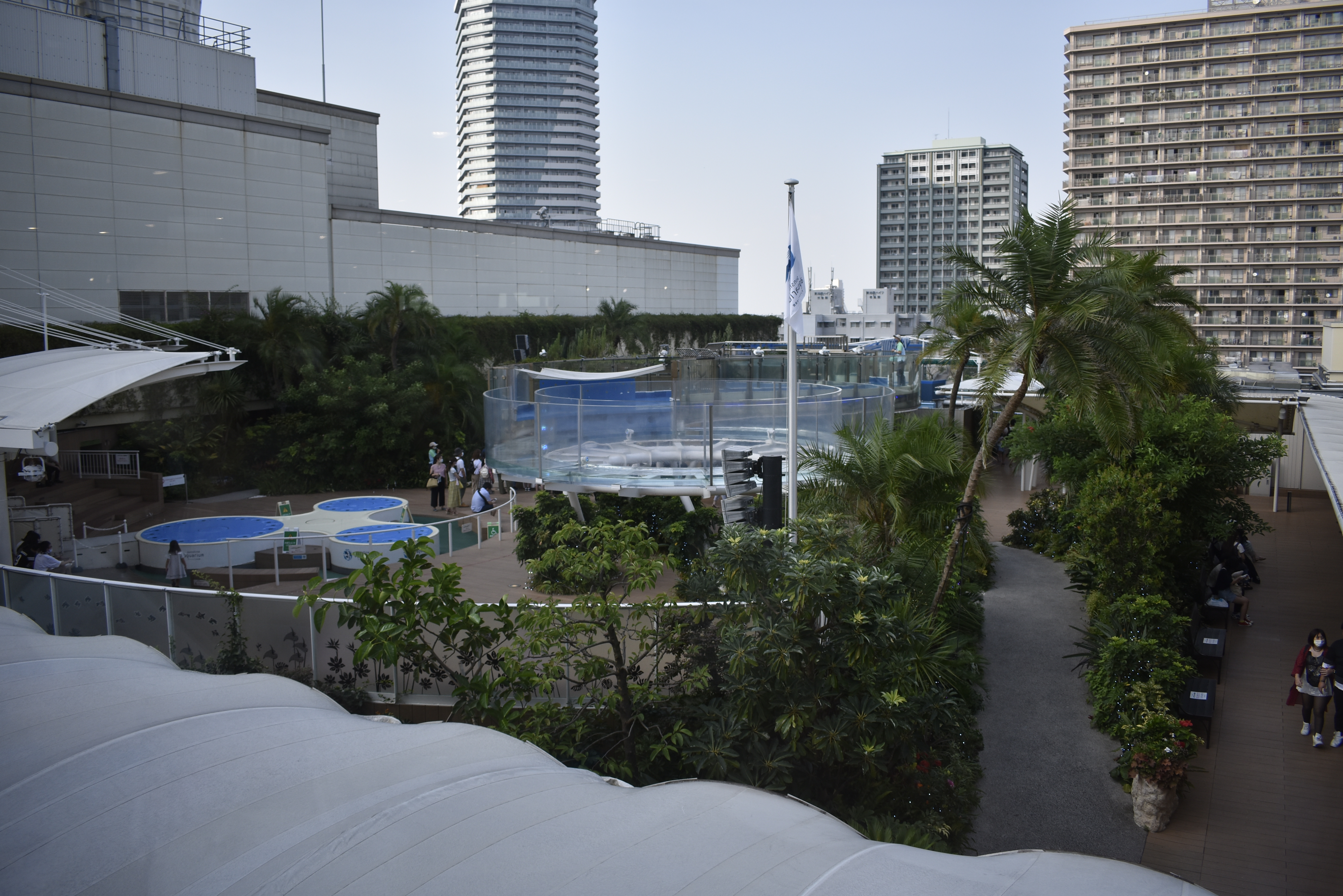
- Sunshine Aquarium top floors
- Interactive map of Sunshine Aquarium (サンシャイン水族館
- Date opened: October 1978
- Location: Toshima, Tokyo, Japan
- Land area: 7,765 m^{2} (83,580 sq ft)
- No. of animals: 37,000
- No. of species: 750
- Volume of largest tank: 240,000 litres (63,000 US gal)
- Total volume of tanks: 770,000 litres (203,000 US gal)
- Annual visitors: 2.24 million (2018)
- Memberships: JAZA
- Major exhibits: Sunshine Lagoon
- Management: Sunshine Enterprises
- Website: https://sunshinecity.jp/en/aquarium/

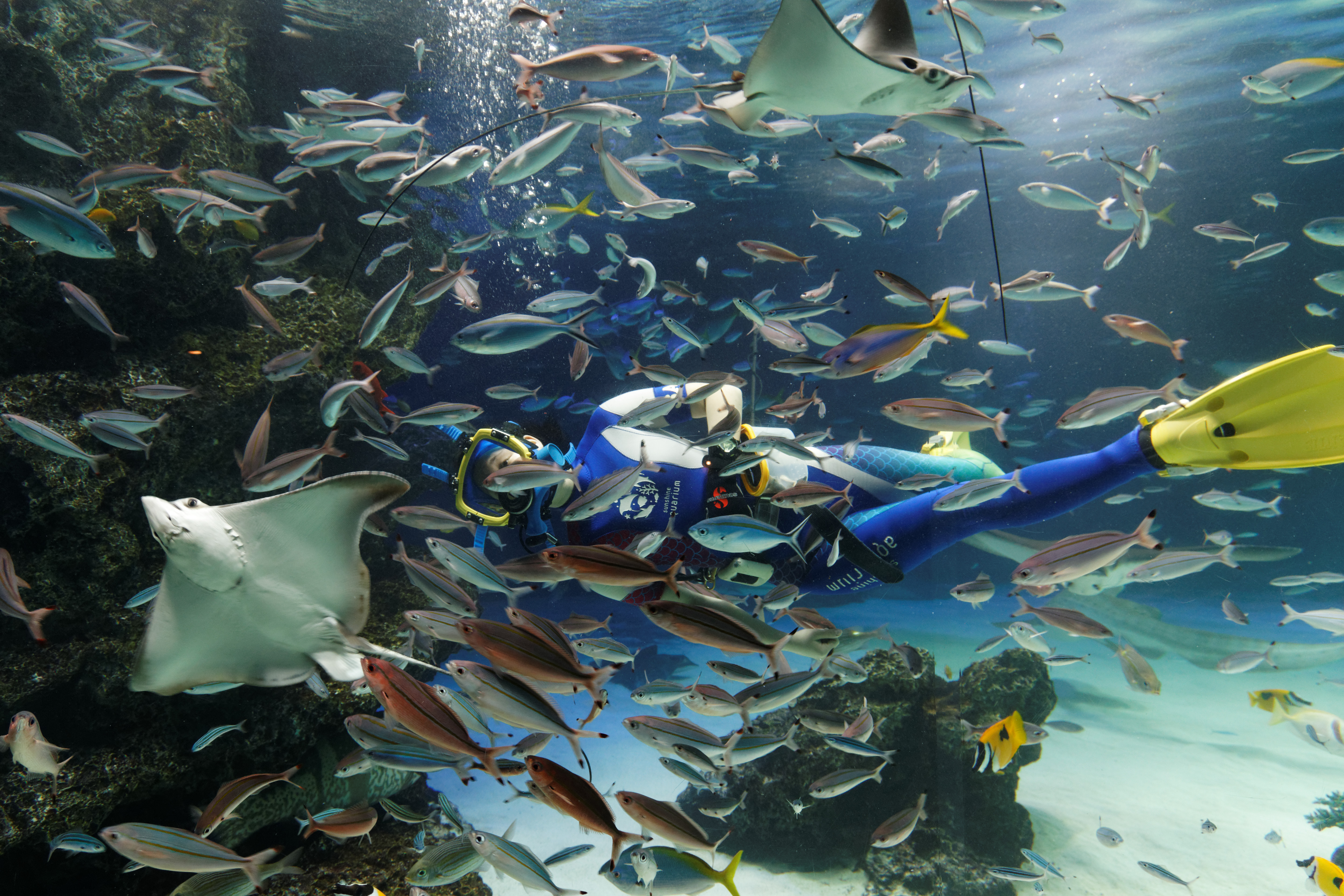
Main tanks ”Sunshine lagoon”

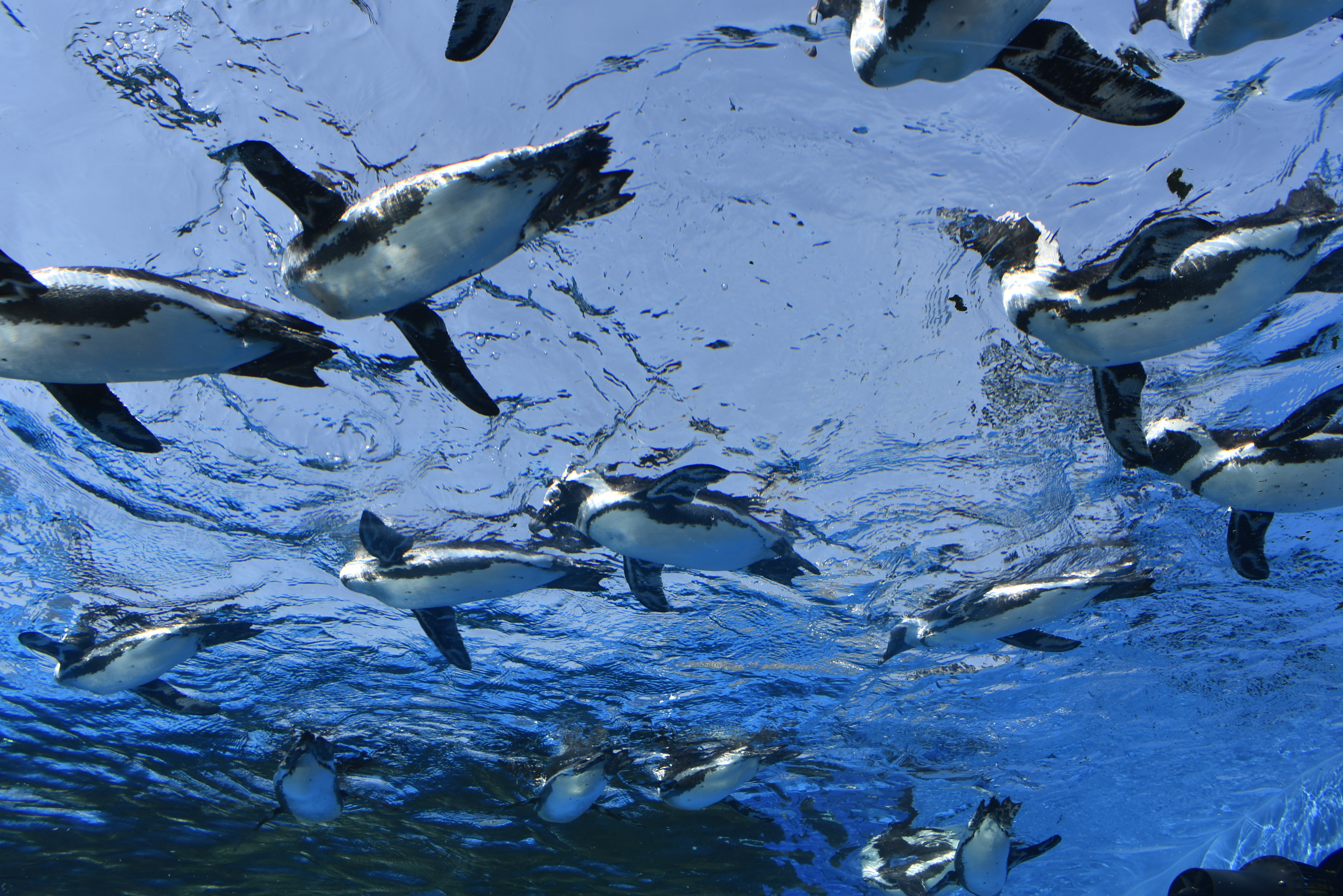
Penguins in the Sky

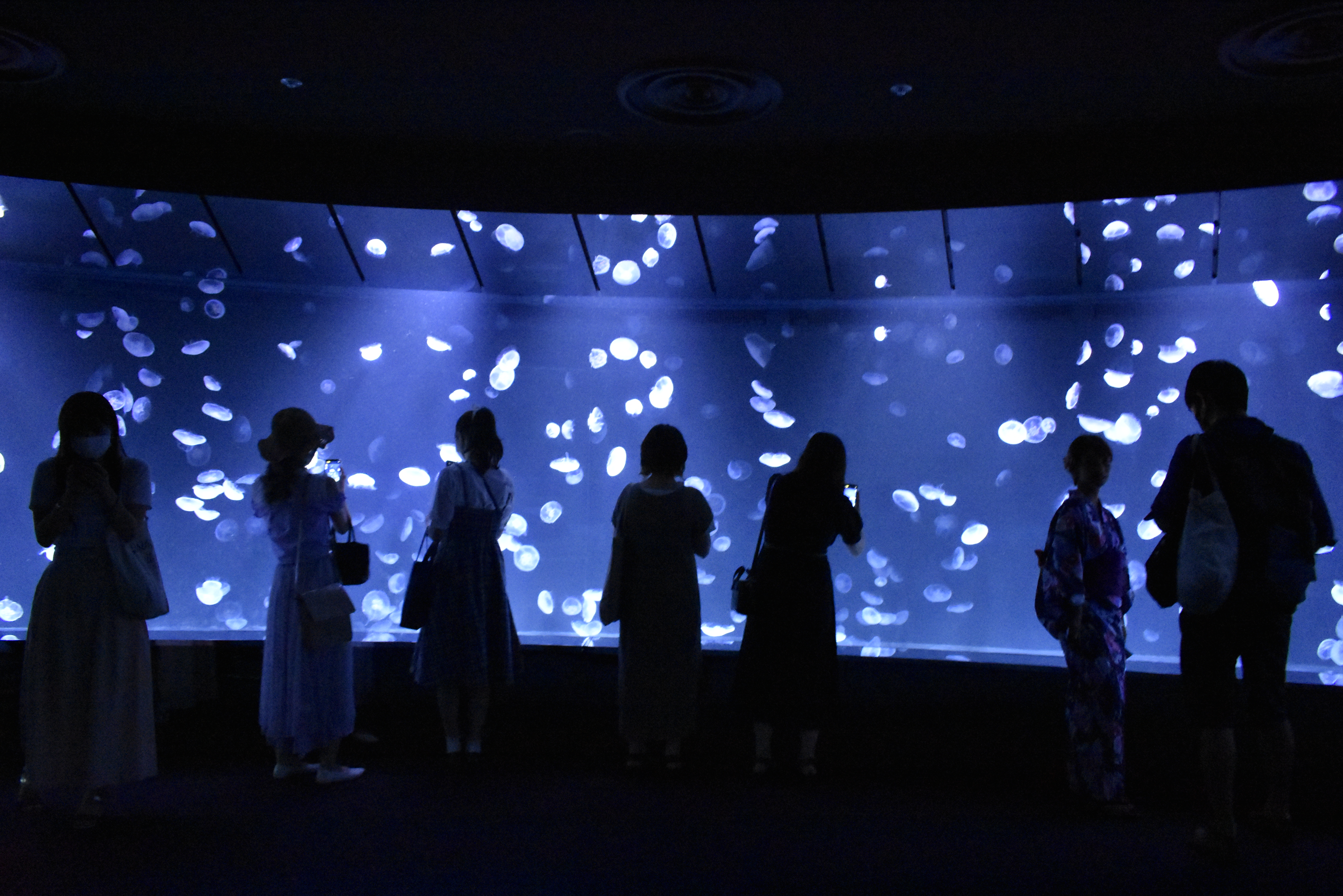
Kurage Kukan

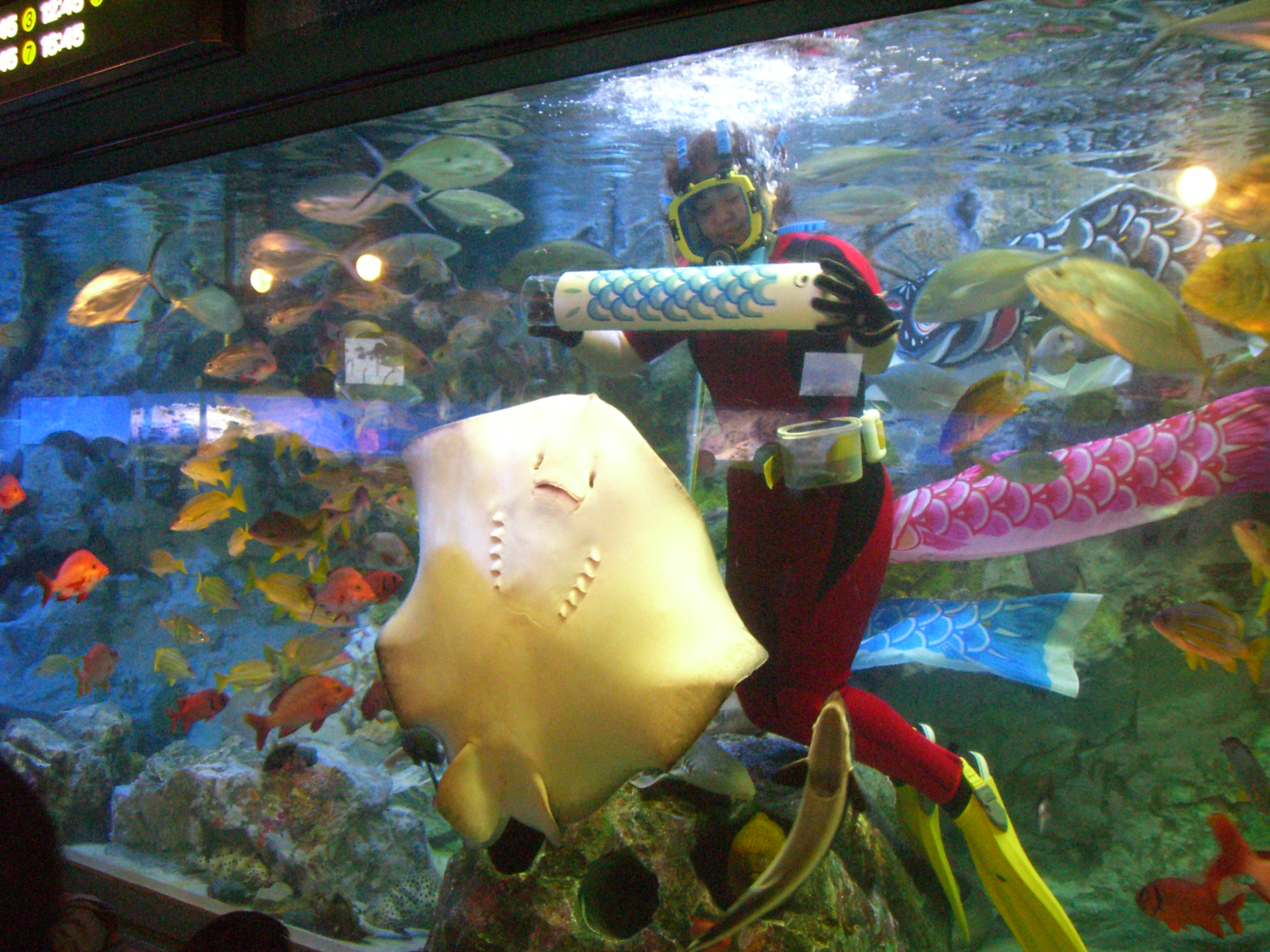
Sunshine International Aquarium (before renovation)

Sunshine Aquarium (サンシャイン水族館, Sanshain suizokukan), formerly known as Sunshine International Aquarium (サンシャイン国際水族館, Sanshain kokusai suizokukan), is a public aquarium located on the top floors and rooftop of the World Import Mart building in Sunshine City, Tokyo, Japan. The aquarium opened in October 1978. It was closed for one year from September 1, 2010, for a full renovation, and reopened on August 4, 2011. It is operated by Sunshine Enterprises, Inc.

It features around 80 tanks with 37,000 fish representing 750 species.

== Overview ==
Sunshine Aquarium's location on the top of a building makes it difficult to renovate on a large scale due to weight restrictions; it has a smaller floor area compared to most aquariums.

The aquarium includes Sunshine Coral Reef, the first permanent reproduction of a coral reef environment in Japan, which houses animals such as great white pelicans, Baikal seals, zebra sharks; the Zoo-Zoo House, which focuses on land animals, and the Sunshine Lagoon. Visitors can feed the carnivorous arowana and dourado, watch sea lion shows, and experience backyard feeding.

The aquarium also has a focus on breeding large fish such as shark rays and sunfish.

== History ==
The site received TripAdvisor's "Certificate of Excellence" in 2015.

On January 7, 2016, a female Russian sea otter, Mir, died of lymphoma. A male otter, Royce, who had come from Adventure World to breed with Mir, was relocated to the Toba Aquarium, bringing the curtain down on the 30-year history of the otter exhibit.

On July 12, 2017, the outdoor area "Marine Garden" was reopened. Five new exhibits were introduced: "Penguins in the Sky", "Penguins in the Meadow", "Otters in the Water", "Sparkling Fountain", and "Sky Pass". The "Penguins in the Sky" exhibit is located on the rooftop and gives the impression of flying over the city.

On July 9, 2020, the new jellyfish area Kurage Kuukan (海月空間) opened.

== Gallery ==
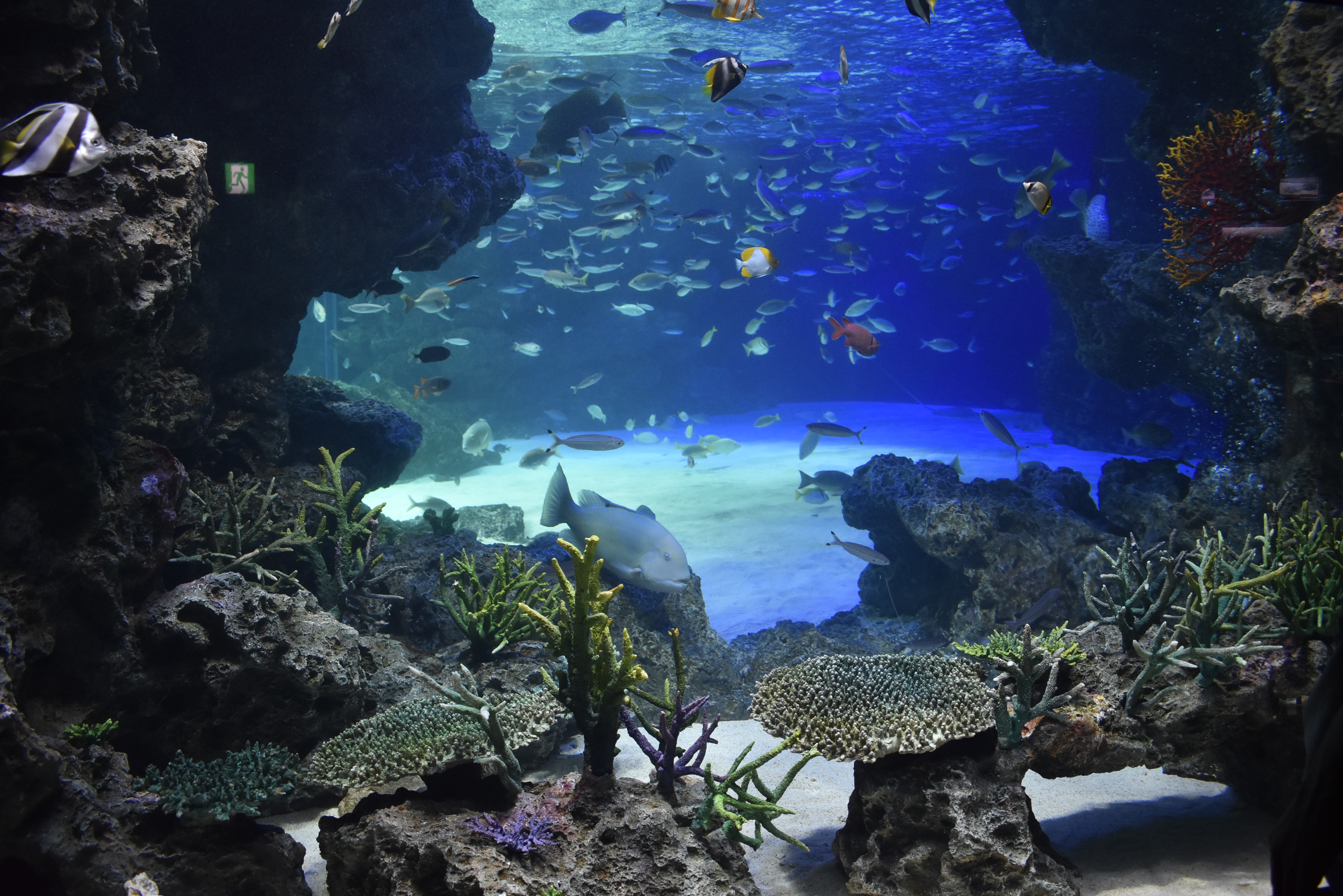

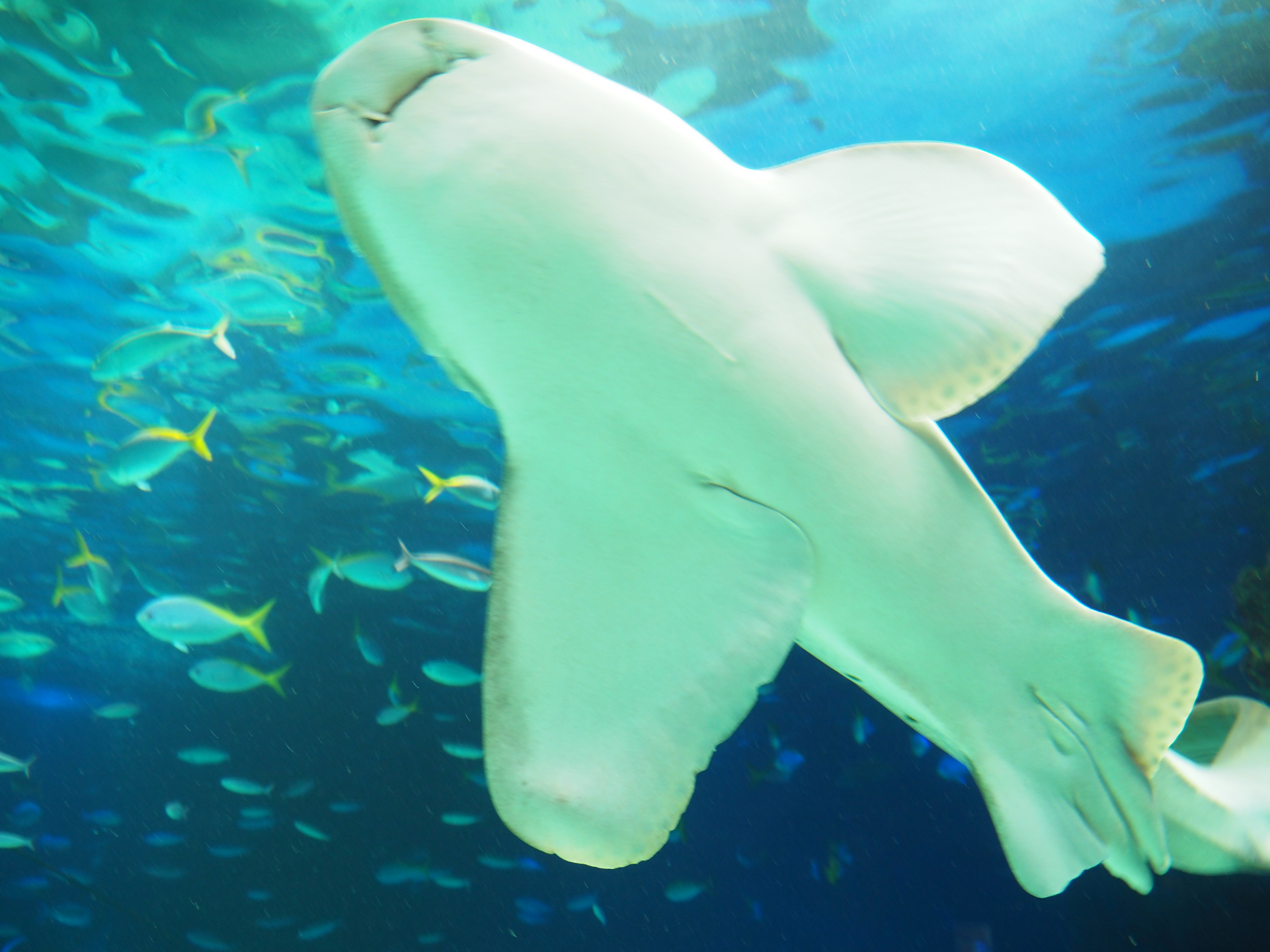

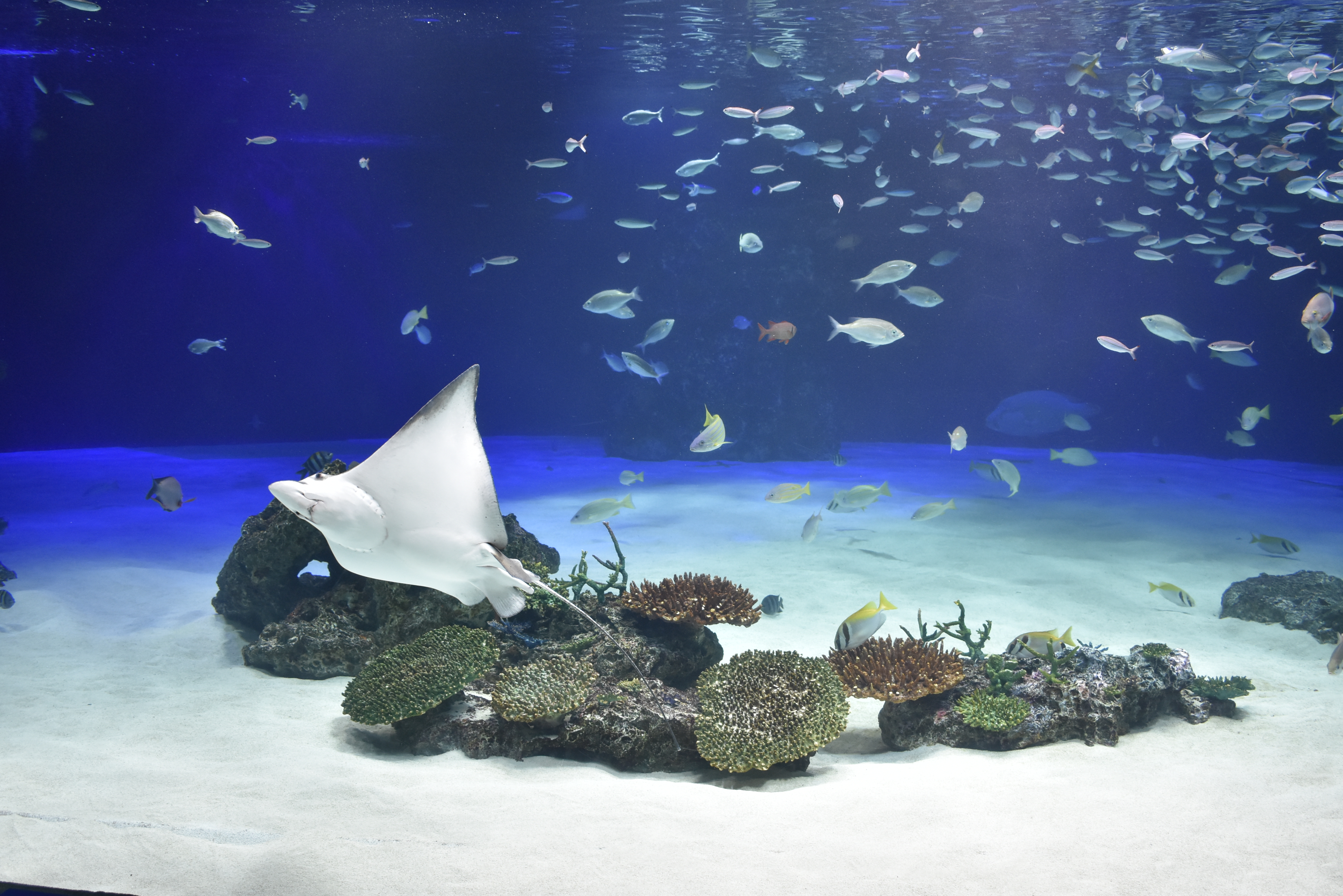

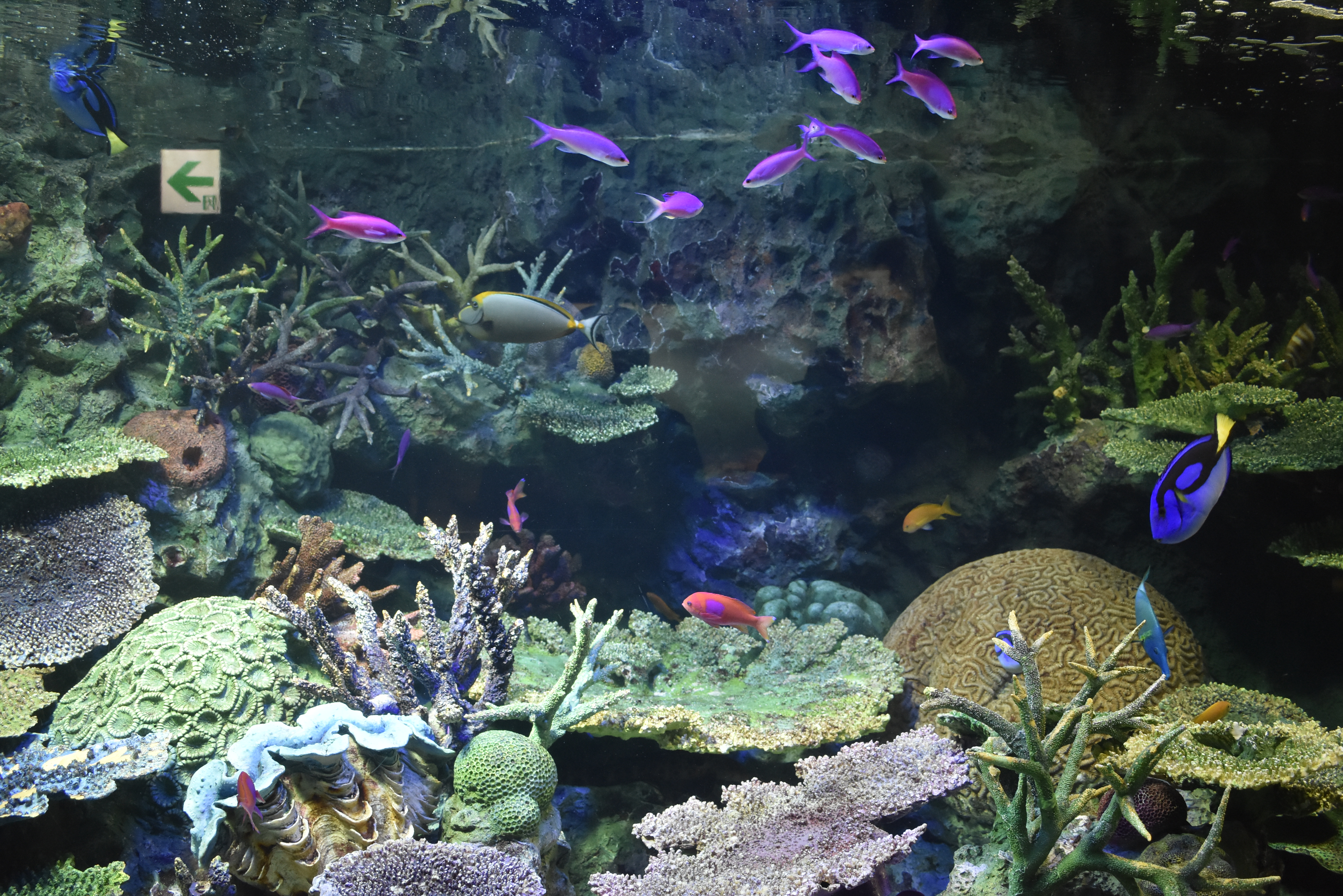

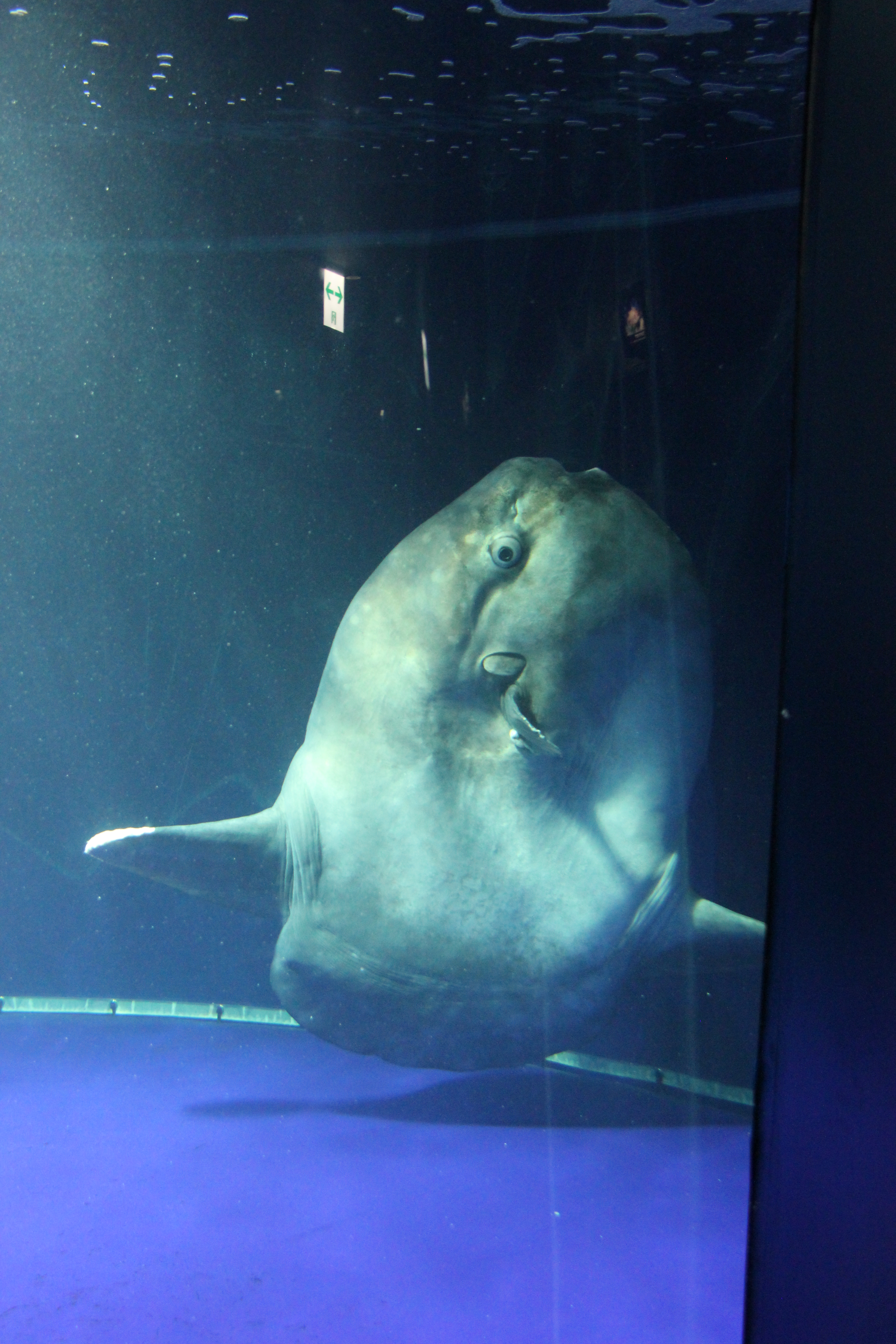

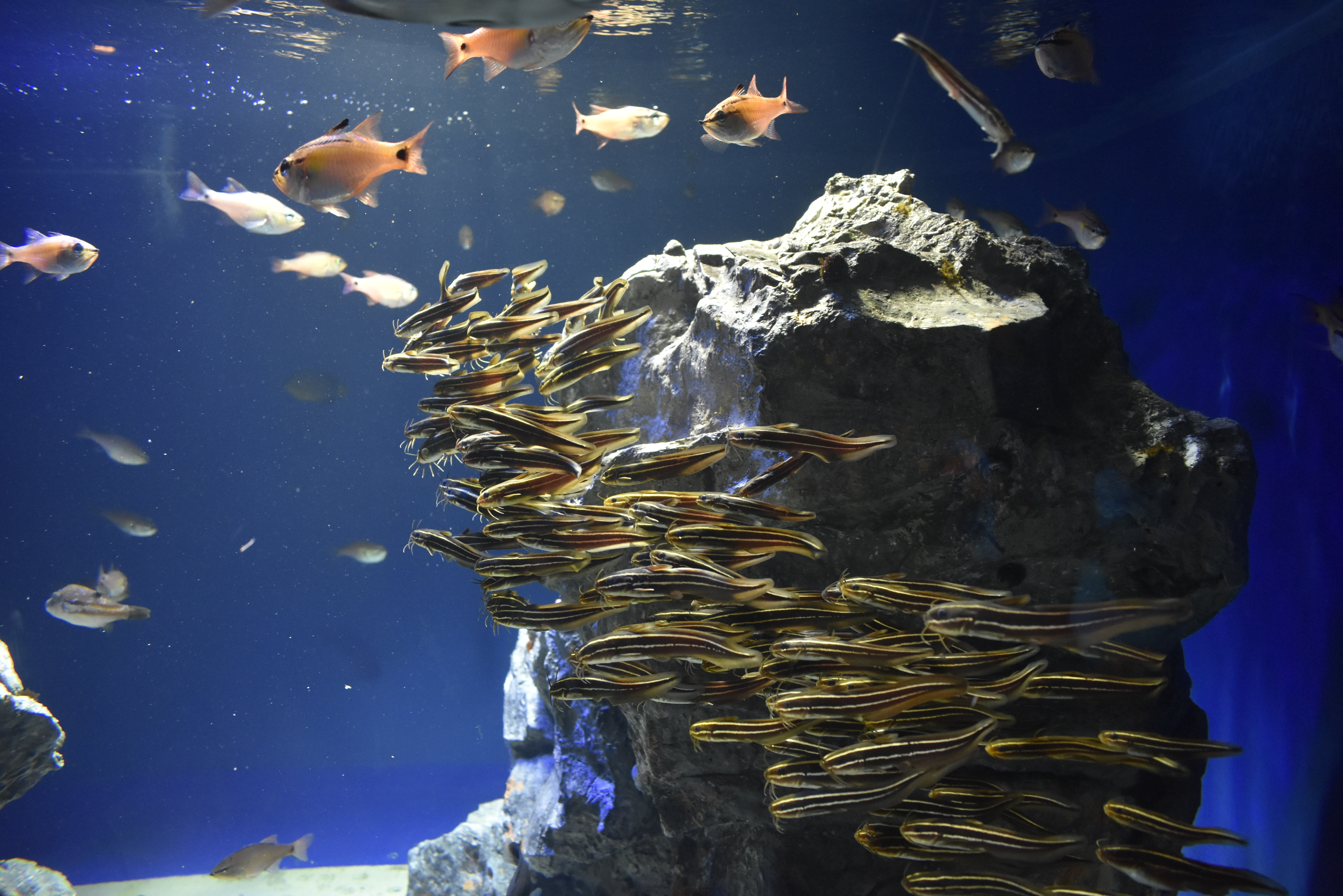

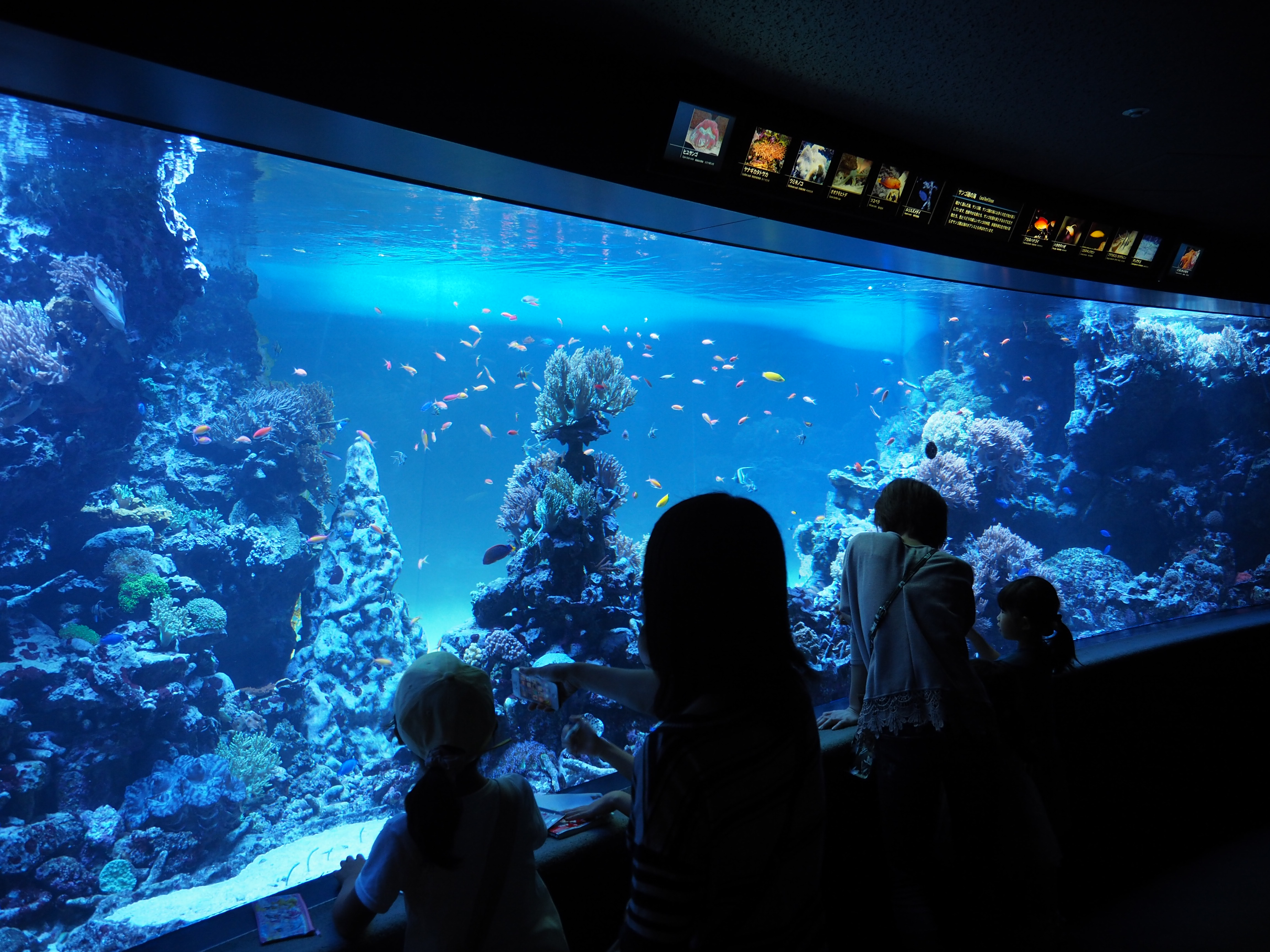

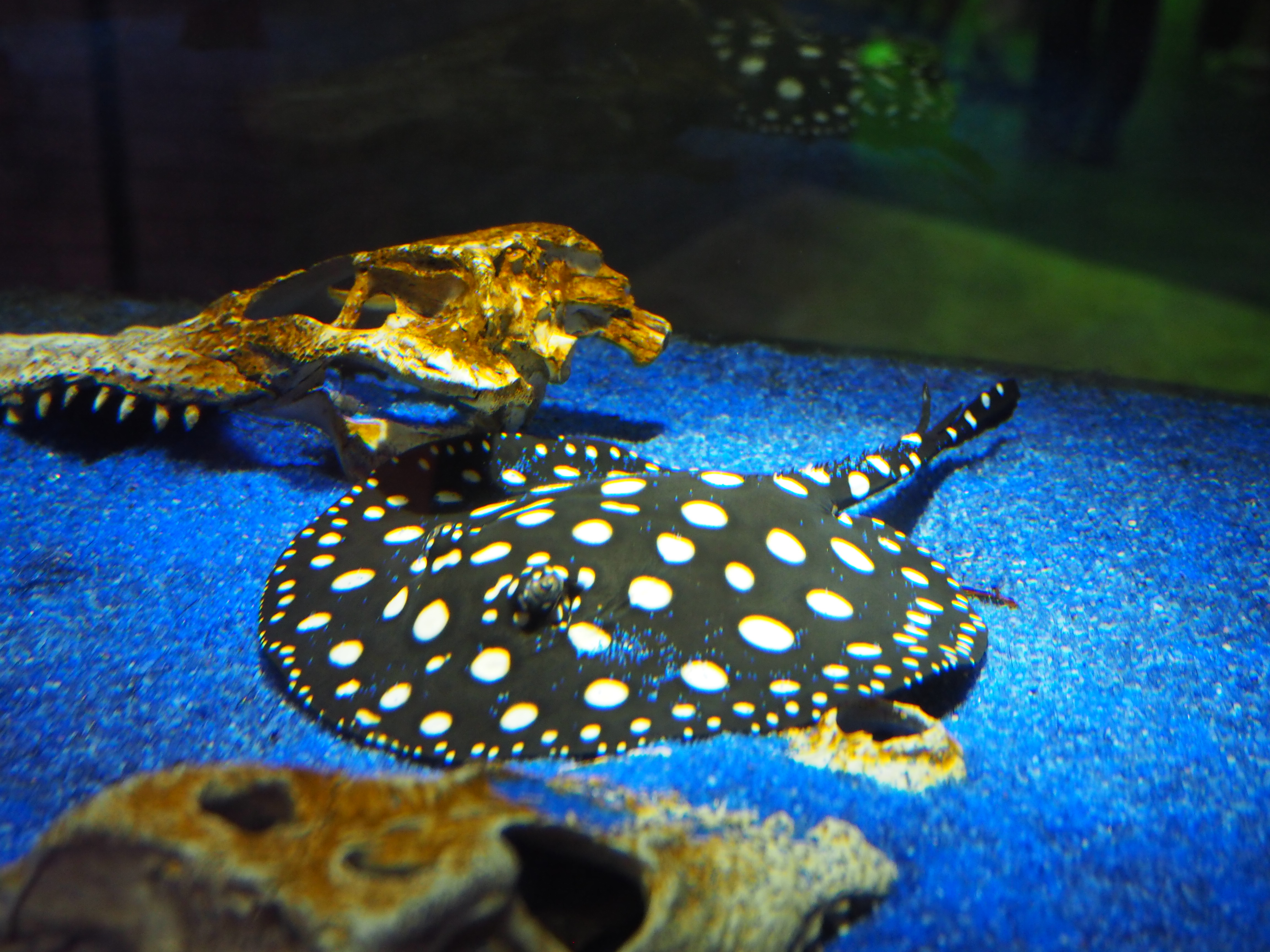

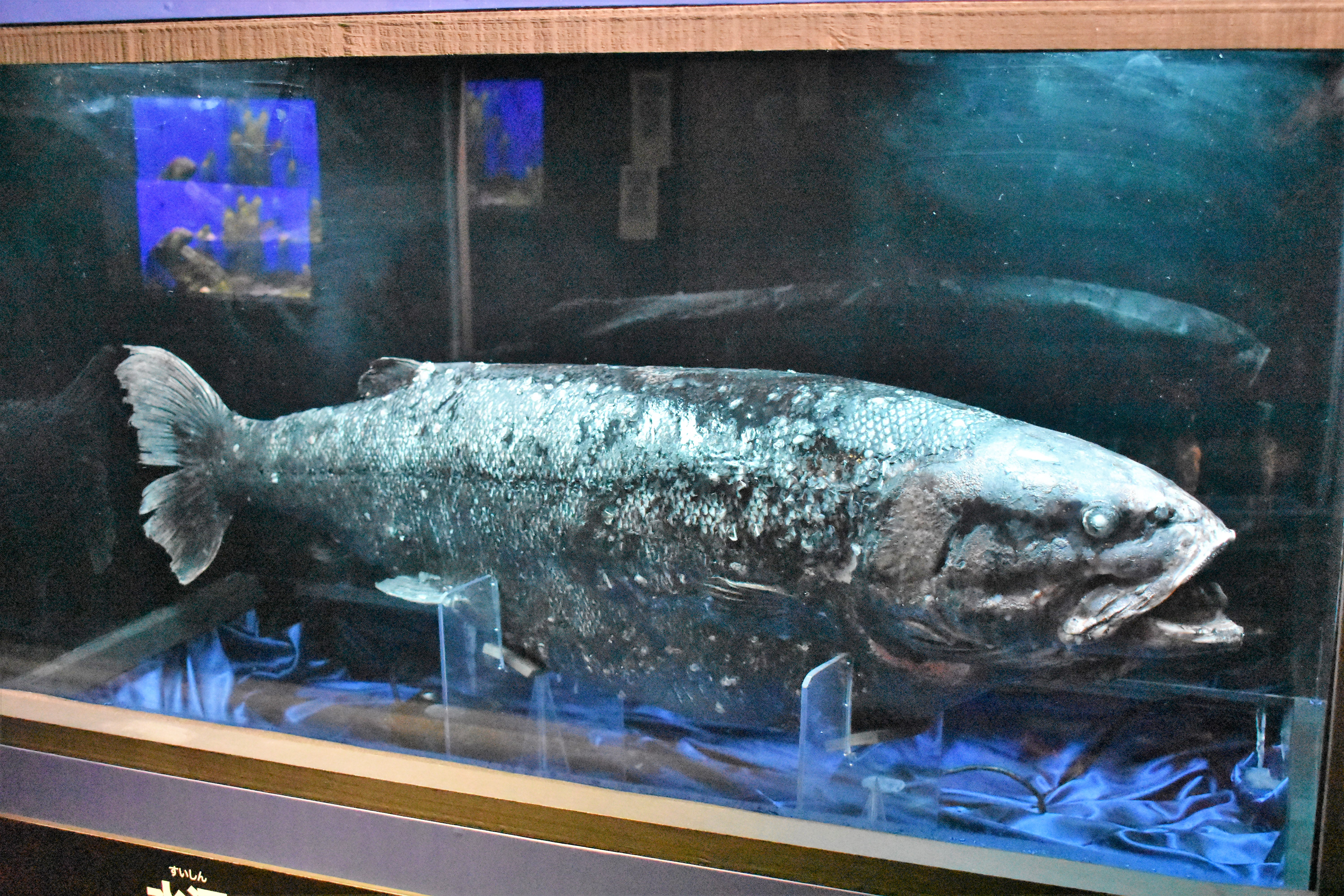

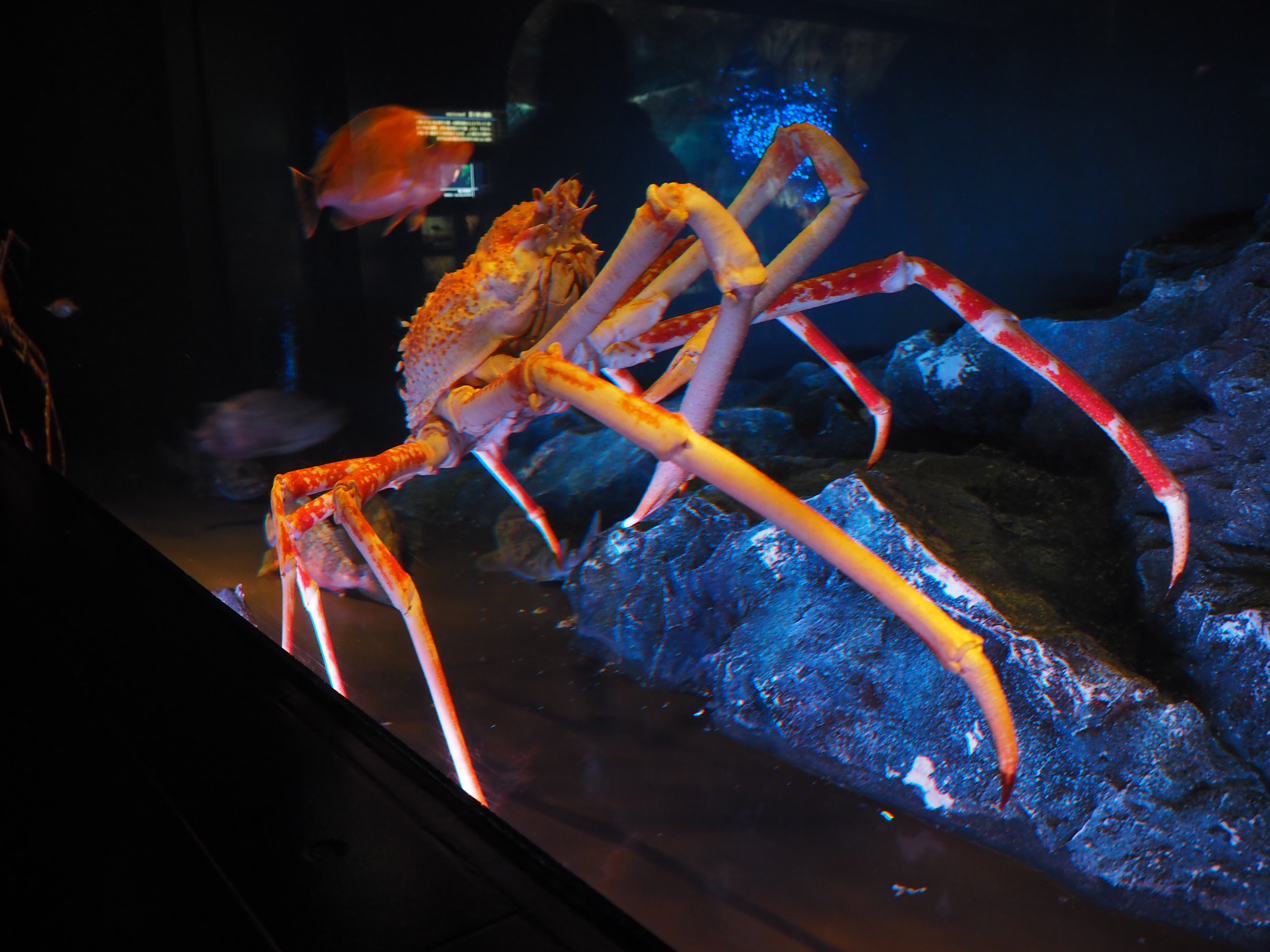

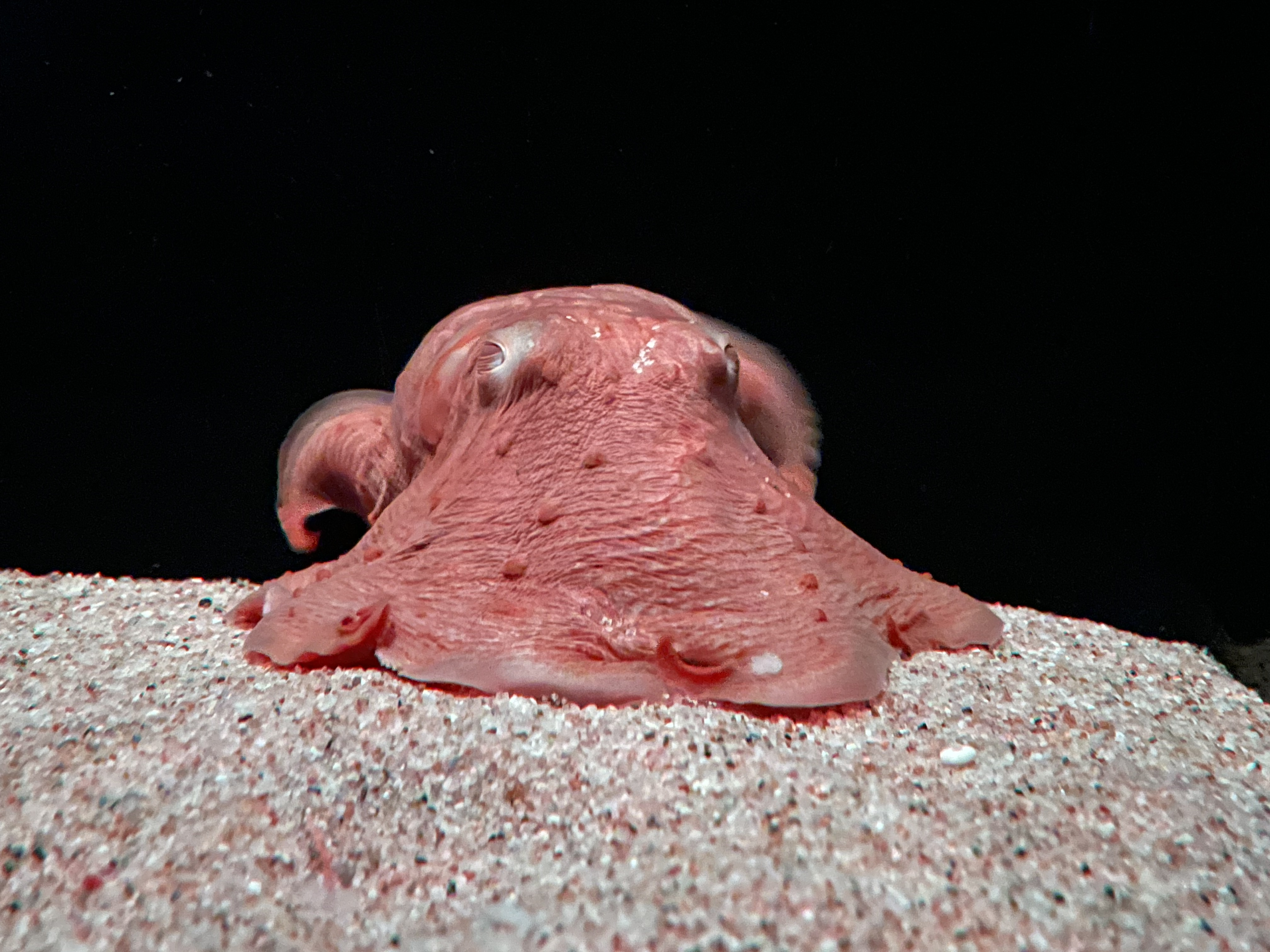

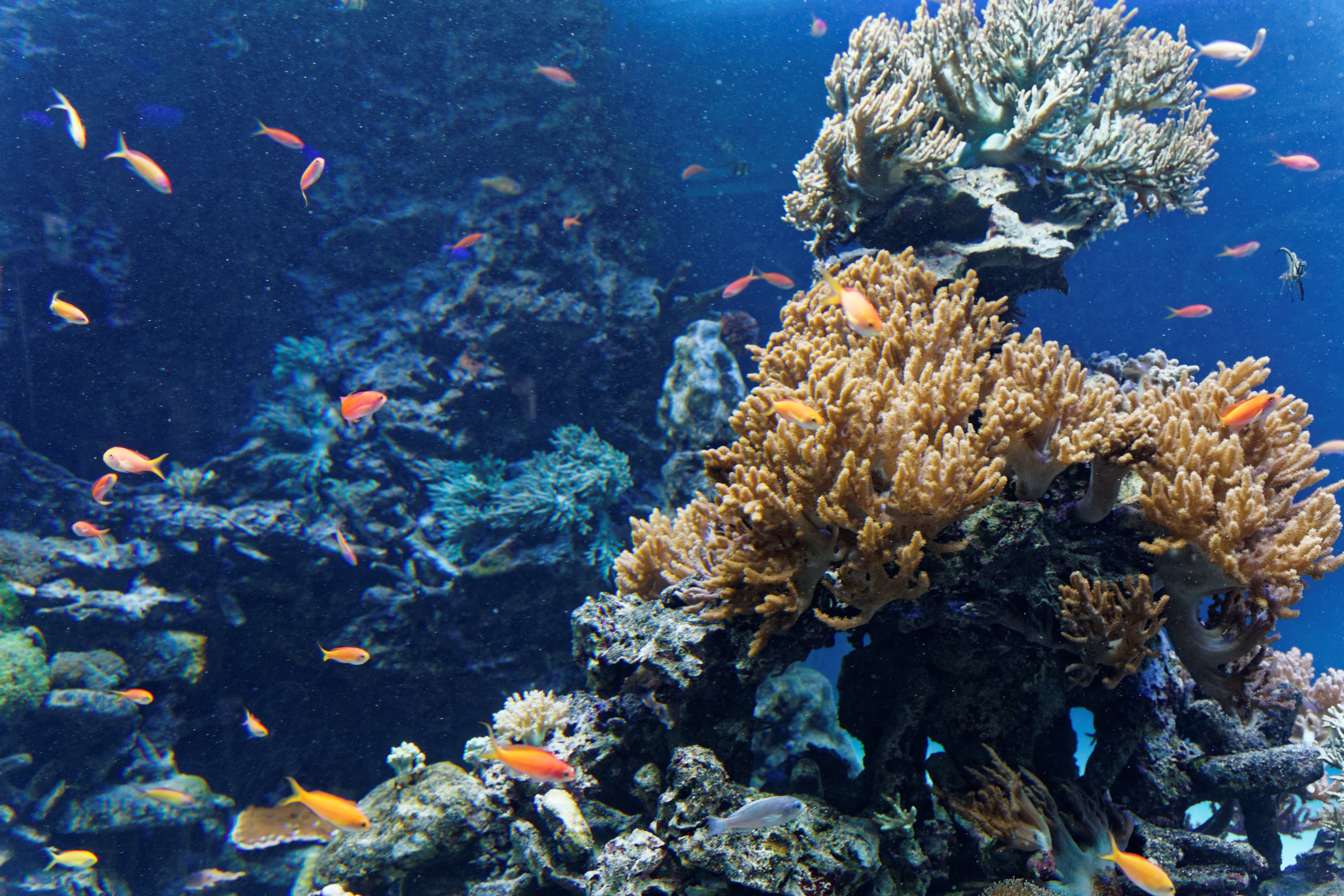

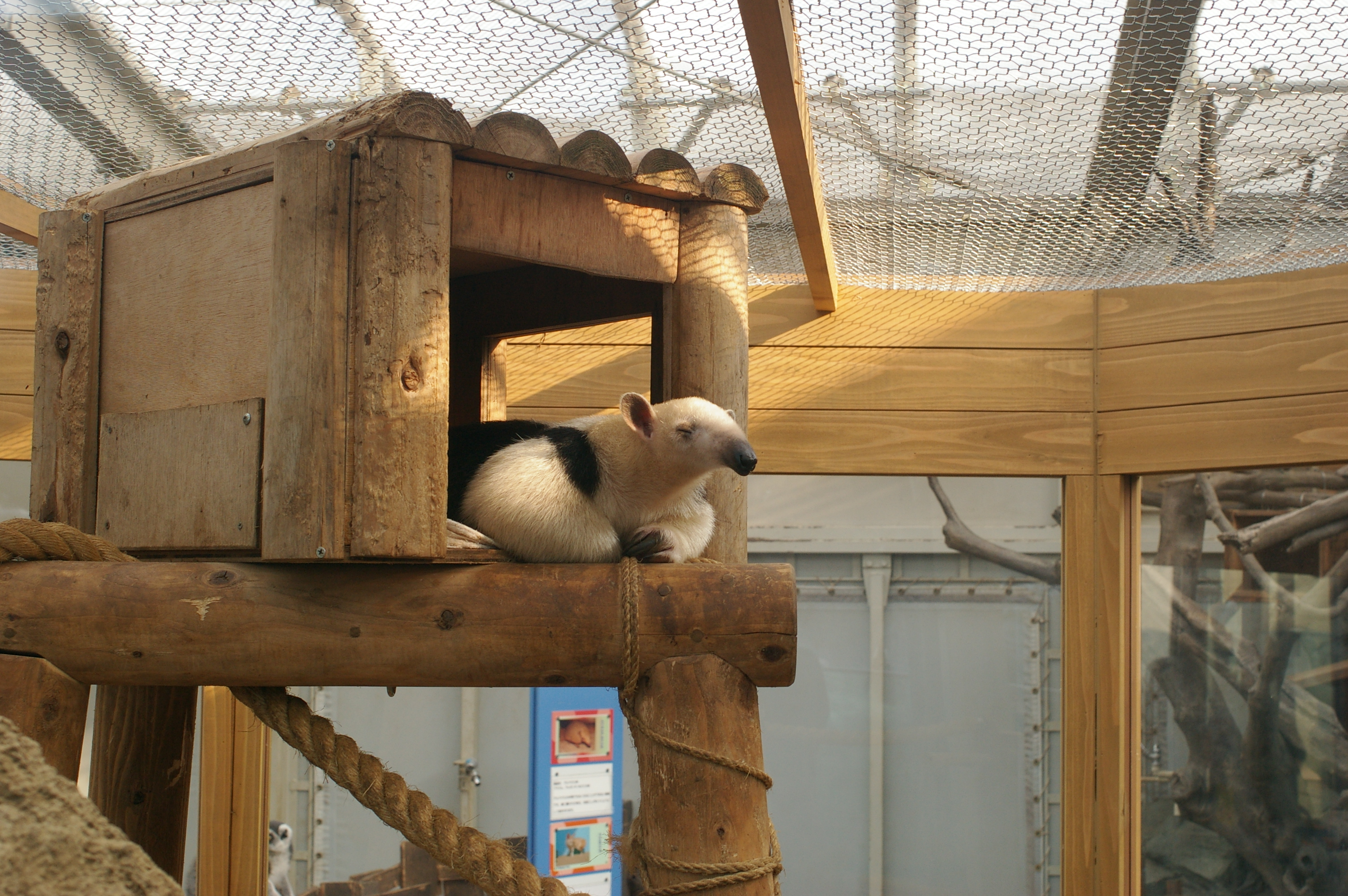

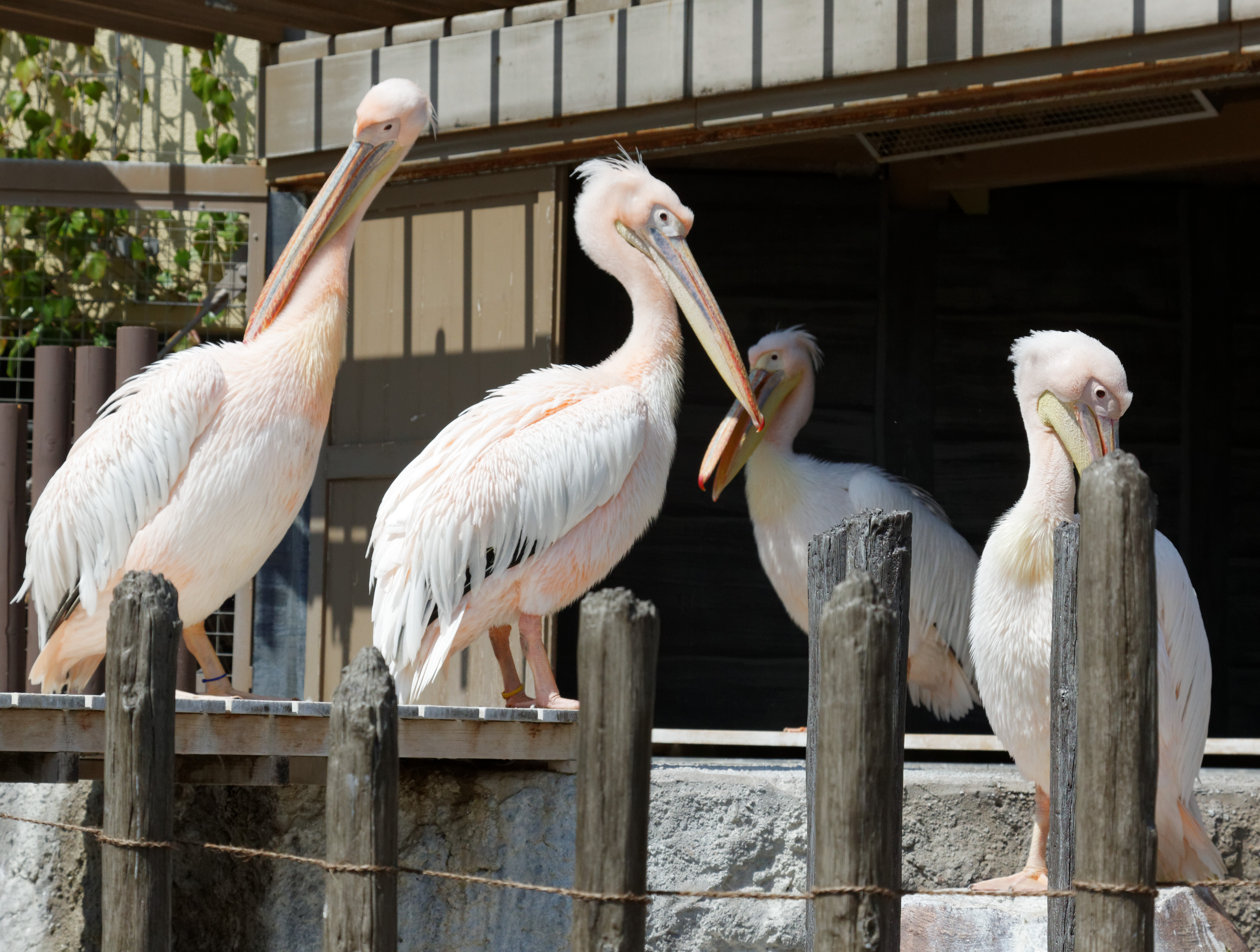

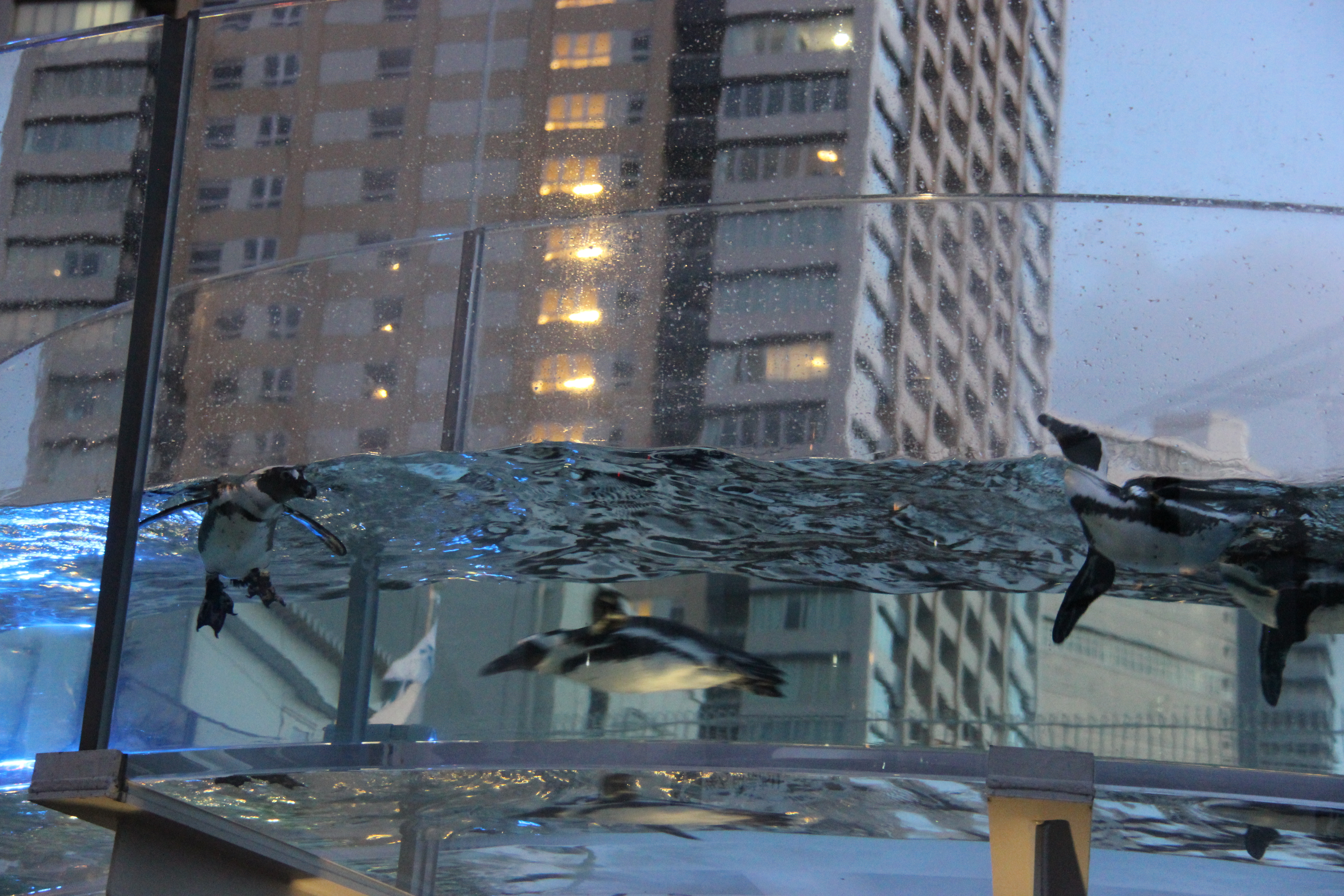

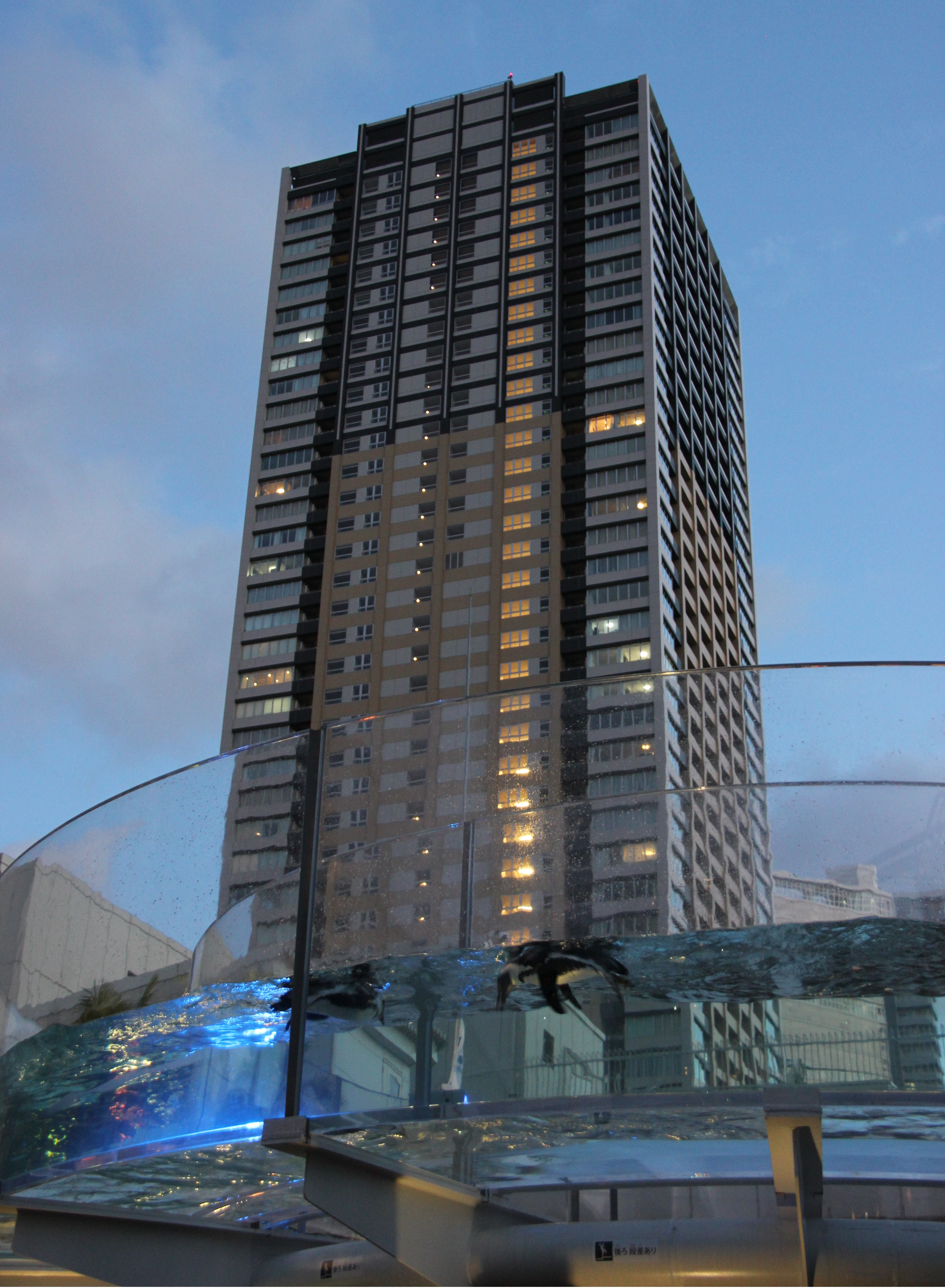

== See also ==
- Sunshine City, Tokyo
